= Hungary in the Eurovision Song Contest 2015 =

- Eurovision Song Contest 2015
- Country: Hungary
- Selection process: A Dal 2015
- Selection date: 28 February 2015

Competing entry
- Song: "Wars for Nothing"
- Artist: Boggie
- Songwriters: Áron Sebestyén; Boglárka Csemer; Sára Hélène Bori

Placement
- Semi-final result: Qualified (8th, 67 points)
- Final result: 20th, 19 points

Participation chronology

Hungary was represented at the Eurovision Song Contest 2015 with the song "Wars for Nothing", written by Áron Sebestyén, Boglárka Csemer and Sára Hélène Bori. The song was performed by Boggie. The Hungarian broadcaster Media Services and Support Trust Fund (MTVA) in collaboration with the Hungarian public broadcaster Magyar Televízió (MTV), organised the national final A Dal 2015 in order to select the Hungarian entry for the Eurovision Song Contest in Vienna, Austria. Following a six-week long selection process, Boggie emerged as the winner with the acoustic guitar driven ballad "Wars for Nothing". In the first of the Eurovision semi-finals "Wars for Nothing" placed eighth out of the 16 participating countries, securing its place among the 27 other songs in the final. In Hungary's thirteenth Eurovision appearance on 23 May, "Wars for Nothing" finished in twentieth place, receiving 19 points.

== Background ==
Prior to the 2015 contest, Hungary had participated in the Eurovision Song Contest twelve times since their first entry in 1994. Hungary's best placing in the contest was fourth, which they achieved with their début entry in 1994 with the song "Kinek mondjam el vétkeimet?" performed by Friderika Bayer. Hungary had attempted participate in the contest in 1993, however, their entry was eliminated in the preselection show Kvalifikacija za Millstreet. Hungary withdrew from the contest for six years between 1999 and 2004 and also missed the 2006 and 2010 contests. In 2014, Hungary achieved their second best result in the contest since their debut, placing fifth with the song "Running" performed by András Kállay-Saunders.

The Hungarian broadcaster for the 2015 contest, who broadcast the event in Hungary and organised the selection process for its entry, was the Media Services and Support Trust Fund (MTVA). Hungary has previously organised national finals and internal selections to select their Eurovision entry. Since 2012, MTVA has organised A Dal, a national selection show which has managed to produce winning songs that have qualified the nation to the final of the Eurovision Song Contest each year and has resulted in two top 10 placings in 2013 and 2014. The Hungarian broadcaster opted to continue selecting their entry through this process for 2015.

== Before Eurovision ==
=== A Dal 2015 ===
A Dal 2015 was the fourth edition of A Dal which selected the Hungarian entry for the Eurovision Song Contest 2015. The competition consisted of six shows commenced on 24 January 2015 and concluded with a final on 28 February 2015. All shows in the competition were broadcast on M1, Duna World, and online at adal2015.hu. A companion aftershow titled A Dal+ was also broadcast on M2 following each show.

==== Format ====
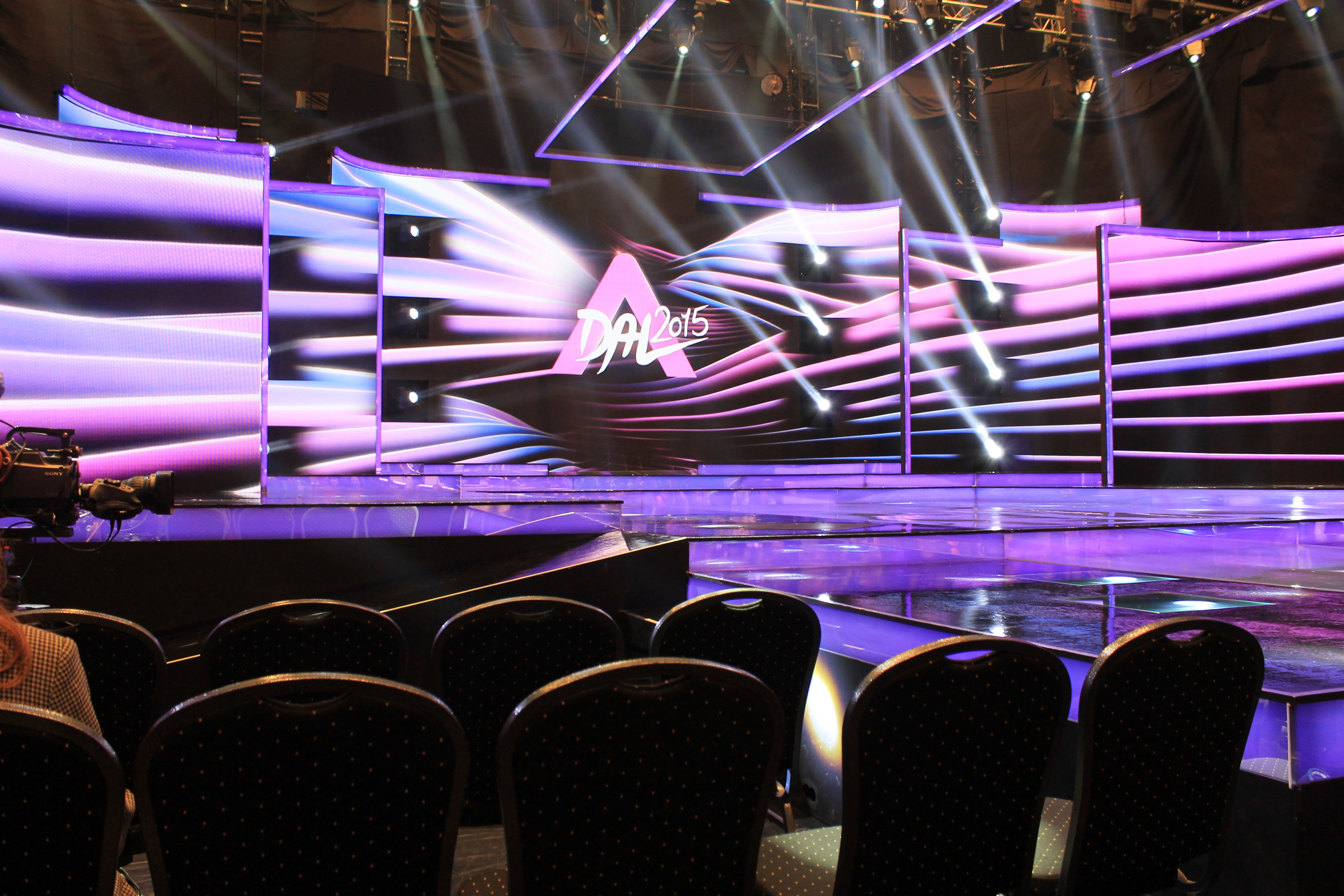
The studio of A Dal 2015 in the MTVA headquarters building

The format of the competition consisted of six shows: three heats, two semi-finals and a final. The six shows took place at MTVA Studio 1 in Budapest and was hosted by Csilla Tatár. Tatár was joined during the shows by Levente Harsányi, who also hosted the green room segments in addition to presenting the aftershow A Dal+. The three heats, held on 24 January 2015, 31 January 2015 and 7 February 2015, each featured ten entries with six advancing to the semi-finals from each show. The semi-finals, held on 14 and 21 February 2015, each featured nine entries with four advancing to the final from each show. The final, held on 28 February 2015, selected the Hungarian entry for Vienna from the eight remaining entries.

===== Voting =====
Results during each show were determined by each member of the four-member judging panel and votes from the public. During the heats and the semi-finals, two rounds of voting determined which entries advance to the next stages of the competition. In the first round of voting, each judge assigned scores to each entry ranging from 1 (lowest score) to 10 (highest score). The public acted as the fifth juror and also assigned one aggregate score between 1 and 10 by either submitting their score via an SMS or voting through a mobile app specifically designed for the competition. The summation of the judges scores and the aggregate score from the public's SMS and voting app submissions determined the final scores for the first round. In the heats, the top five entries with the highest scores advanced to the semi-finals. In the semi-finals, the top three entries with the highest scores advanced to the final. In the case of a tie among the entries in the first round of voting, the judging panel deliberated and determined which entries would advance. In the second round of voting, the remaining entries that did not qualify during the first round faced an SMS and mobile app vote where the single entry that receives the most votes from each heat and semi-final also advanced. In the case of a tie during the second round of voting, the entry which received a higher score during the first round of voting would have advanced and should a tie still persist in such a situation, the judging panel would deliberate and determine which entry would have advanced.

In the final, the eight remaining entries also faced two rounds of voting. In the first round, the judges assigned points to their six preferred entries: 4 (lowest), 6, 8 and 10 (highest). The top four entries determined by the judges qualified to the second round of voting. In the second round, the public exclusively determined the winning entry by voting via SMS and mobile app.

===== Judges =====
The judging panel participates in each show by providing feedback to the competing artists and selecting entries to advance in the competition. The panel consisted of:

- Pierrot – composer, performer, songwriter and producer
- Jenő Csiszár – television and radio host
- Magdi Rúzsa – singer-songwriter and Hungarian representative at the Eurovision Song Contest 2007
- Philip Rákay – MTV programme director

==== Competing entries ====
Artists and composers were able to submit their applications and entries for the competition between 1 October 2014 and 15 November 2014. Competing artists were required to either hold Hungarian citizenship or be able to speak Hungarian fluently. In addition, only artists that had a valid contract with a record company/professional management and that had either released an album or have had national radio airplays or television appearances were eligible to compete. Artists were permitted to collaborate with international composers and submit songs in English and/or in a recognised minority language in Hungary, however, in such cases a translation of the lyrics to Hungarian were required. After the submission deadline had passed, over 300 entries were received by the broadcaster.

A ten-member preselection jury selected thirty entries for the competition. The jury consisted of Pierrot, Jenő Csiszár, Magdi Rúzsa, Philip Rákay, Kata Nyitrai, Fecó Balázs, Attila Horváth, György Koós, Attila Izil Borcsik and Mátyás Milkovics. Ten of the competing artists and songs were announced during a press conference on 8 December 2014. The remaining twenty entries were revealed on 10 and 12 December 2014 during the radio programme Talpra magyar! on MR2 Petőfi Radio. Among the competing artists are former Eurovision Song Contest entrants Kati Wolf, who represented Hungary in the 2011 Contest and Gergő Rácz (competing as a member of Fool Moon) who previously represented Hungary in the 1997 Contest as part of the group V.I.P.

Artist	Song	Songwriter(s)
Timi Antal	"Woke Up This Way"	Miklós Malek, Dimitri Ehrlich
Chances	"The Night"	János Kosztyu, Ferenc Orbán
Boglárka Csemer – Boggie	"Wars for Nothing"	Áron Sebestyén, Boglárka Csemer, Sára Hélène Bori
Bogi Dallos	"World of Violence"	Zoltán Tóth G., Péter Halász
Heni Dér	"Ébresztő"	Krisztián Burai, Henrietta Dér, Ernő Bodoczki, Norbert Csicsák, Norbert Szabó
Gyula Éliás Jr. feat. Fourtissimo	"Run to You"	Gyula Éliás Jr., Martina Király
Balázs Farkas-Jenser	"Liar"	Bence Péter, Kata Kozma
Fool Moon	"Back 2 Right"	Gábor Molnár, Kasai Jnoffin
Bálint Gájer	"That's How It Goes"	Norbert Elek, Bálint Gájer, Johnny K. Palmer
Ív	"Fire"	Éva Katona-Zsombori, Lóránt Tóth, László Gálosi
Karmapolis	"Time Is Now"	András Kenyeres, Szabolcs Szipszer, Gábor Lipi
Ildikó Keresztes	"Hazám hazád lehet"	Géza Pálvölgyi, József Márkus
Leander Rising	"Lőjetek fel"	Leander Köteles, Attila Vörös, József Péter Takács, Béla Budai
Bori Magyar	"Lead Me to Heaven"	Tamás Váradi, Attila Ferencz
MDC	"Maniac"	Attila Fehér, Botond Lapis, Kasai Jnoffin
Zoltán Mujahid	"Beside You"	Zoltán Mujahid, László "Diaz" Csöndör, Johnny K. Palmer
New Level Empire	"Homelights"	Péter Krajczár, Zoltán Szilveszter Ujvári, Sándor Nyújtó, Petra Mayer
Gergő Oláh	"A tükör előtt"	Lajos Havas, Norbert Csicsák, Gergő Oláh, Márton Lombos
Other Planet	"Untold Story"	Péter Szikra, Bálint Széll, Ádám Őry, Leopold Nagy
Pankastic!	"Kicsi a világ, de nagy világ"	Tamás Kálmán
Passed	"Mesmerize"	Dorottya Nizalowski, Fanni Nizalowski, Dávid Godzsák, Levente Szabó
Barbara Péter	"Listen to the Universe"	Zoltán Tóth G., Péter Halász
Proof of Life	"Hol a határ"	Péter Krajczár, Csaba Schmél, Nelli Nagyváradi
Spoon	"Keep Marching On"	George Németh, Erik Fijeld, Ida Wardahl
Ádám Szabó	"Give Me Your Love"	Ádám Szabó, Tamás Bori, Tamás Katona, Kata Kozma
Gergő Szakács	"Ősz utca"	László "Diaz" Csöndör, Gergő Szakács, Tamás Karácson
Saci Szécsi and Böbe Szécsi	"Our Time"	Saci Szécsi, Böbe Szécsi
Gabi Szűcs	"Úgysem felejtesz el"	Iván Gátos, Gabi Szűcs, György Hegyi
Vera Tóth	"Gyémánt"	Róbert Hrutka
Kati Wolf	"Ne engedj el"	Martin Ankelius, Sebastian Zelle, Péter Krajczár, Eszter Major, Linnea Deb

==== Shows ====
===== Heats =====
Three heats took place on 24 January, 31 January and 7 February 2015. In each heat ten entries competed and six entries qualified to the semi-finals after two rounds of voting. In the first round of voting, five qualifiers were determined by the combination of scores from each judge and an aggregate score from a public SMS and mobile app vote. In the second round of voting, the remaining five entries that were not in the initial top five faced a public vote consisting of votes submitted through SMS in order to determine one additional qualifier.

Jury and public voting qualifier Public voting qualifier

Heat 1 – 24 January 2014
R/O	Artist	Song	M. Rúzsa	J. Csiszár	Pierrot	P. Rákay	Viewers	Total	Result
1	Bori Magyar	"Lead Me to Heaven"	5	7	6	6	5	29	—N/a
2	Balázs Farkas-Jenser	"Liar"	9	8	5	9	6	37	—N/a
3	Gabi Szűcs	"Úgysem felejtesz el"	8	9	7	8	5	37	Advanced
4	Passed	"Mesmerize"	10	9	9	9	6	43	Advanced
5	Bogi Dallos	"World of Violence"	8	7	6	10	7	38	Advanced
6	Karmapolis	"Time Is Now"	7	9	7	8	6	37	Advanced
7	Gergő Szakács	"Ősz utca"	6	7	4	9	7	33	—N/a
8	Timi Antal	"Woke Up This Way"	6	6	6	7	8	33	Advanced
9	Vera Tóth	"Gyémánt"	10	7	5	9	8	39	Advanced
10	MDC	"Maniac"	5	6	5	7	8	31	—N/a

Heat 2 – 31 January 2014
R/O	Artist	Song	M. Rúzsa	J. Csiszár	Pierrot	P. Rákay	Viewers	Total	Result
1	Chances	"The Night"	5	7	8	6	5	31	—N/a
2	Ádám Szabó	"Give Me Your Love"	10	9	9	10	8	46	Advanced
3	Leander Rising	"Lőjetek fel"	9	7	5	8	7	36	—N/a
4	Ív	"Fire"	8	9	8	7	6	38	Advanced
5	Gyula Éliás Jr. feat. Fourtissimo	"Run to You"	8	8	6	6	8	36	Advanced
6	Pankastic!	"Kicsi a világ, de nagy világ"	10	7	6	9	6	38	Advanced
7	Heni Dér	"Ébresztő"	9	7	4	7	7	34	—N/a
8	New Level Empire	"Homelights"	7	7	4	8	8	34	Advanced
9	Gergő Oláh	"A tükör előtt"	10	8	7	9	7	41	Advanced
10	Saci Szécsi and Böbe Szécsi	"Our Time"	6	7	5	9	7	34	—N/a

Heat 3 – 7 February 2015
R/O	Artist	Song	M. Rúzsa	J. Csiszár	Pierrot	P. Rákay	Viewers	Total	Result
1	Barbara Péter	"Listen to the Universe"	6	6	5	7	6	30	—N/a
2	Zoltán Mujahid	"Beside You"	9	6	9	8	7	39	Advanced
3	Proof of Life	"Hol a határ"	9	9	6	6	7	37	—N/a
4	Boglárka Csemer – Boggie	"Wars for Nothing"	10	9	9	10	8	46	Advanced
5	Fool Moon	"Back 2 Right"	6	6	6	7	7	32	—N/a
6	Ildikó Keresztes	"Hazám hazád lehet"	9	7	6	7	8	37	—N/a
7	Bálint Gájer	"That's How It Goes"	8	7	8	9	8	40	Advanced
8	Other Planet	"Untold Story"	10	10	5	10	7	42	Advanced
9	Kati Wolf	"Ne engedj el"	10	9	8	10	8	45	Advanced
10	Spoon	"Keep Marching On"	8	8	6	8	8	38	Advanced

===== Semi-finals =====
Two semi-finals took place on 14 and 21 February 2015. In each semi-final nine entries competed and four entries qualified to the final after two rounds of voting. In the first round of voting, three qualifiers were determined by the combination of scores from each judge and an aggregate score from a public SMS and mobile app vote. In the second round of voting, the remaining six entries that were not in the initial top three faced a public vote consisting of votes submitted through SMS in order to determine one additional qualifier.

Jury and public voting qualifier Public voting qualifier

Semi-final 1 – 14 February 2015
R/O	Artist	Song	M. Rúzsa	J. Csiszár	Pierrot	P. Rákay	Viewers	Total	Result
1	Timi Antal	"Woke Up This Way"	8	8	8	7	8	39	—N/a
2	Karmapolis	"Time Is Now"	7	8	7	8	6	36	—N/a
3	Vera Tóth	"Gyémánt"	7	7	5	6	7	32	—N/a
4	Zoltán Mujahid	"Beside You"	9	8	10	9	7	43	Advanced
5	Spoon	"Keep Marching On"	8	8	8	9	8	41	Advanced
6	Ádám Szabó	"Give Me Your Love"	9	9	10	10	9	47	Advanced
7	Pankastic!	"Kicsi a világ, de nagy világ"	7	7	6	7	7	34	—N/a
8	Boglárka Csemer – Boggie	"Wars for Nothing"	10	8	10	10	9	47	Advanced
9	New Level Empire	"Homelights"	6	7	4	8	8	33	—N/a

Semi-final 2 – 21 February 2015
R/O	Artist	Song	M. Rúzsa	J. Csiszár	Pierrot	P. Rákay	Viewers	Total	Result
1	Gabi Szűcs	"Úgysem felejtesz el"	6	6	8	7	6	33	—N/a
2	Other Planet	"Untold Story"	9	9	5	10	7	40	—N/a
3	Bogi Dallos	"World of Violence"	8	7	6	9	8	38	—N/a
4	Gergő Oláh	"A tükör előtt"	9	7	8	8	7	39	—N/a
5	Ív	"Fire"	10	9	8	7	7	41	Advanced
6	Gyula Éliás Jr. feat. Fourtissimo	"Run to You"	8	8	7	7	7	37	—N/a
7	Kati Wolf	"Ne engedj el"	10	8	8	10	8	44	Advanced
8	Passed	"Mesmerize"	9	9	9	9	7	43	Advanced
9	Bálint Gájer	"That's How It Goes"	8	7	7	8	8	38	Advanced

===== Final =====
The final took place on 28 February 2015 where the eight entries that qualified from the semi-finals competed. Four songs from each semi-final, eight songs in total, qualified to compete. In the first round, the jury selected the top four songs to proceed to the second round. Instead of assigning scores immediately after each performance, the jury announced their votes after all of the songs were performed. A different voting system for the jury was used with each juror assigning points to their four preferred entries: 4 (lowest), 6, 8 and 10 (highest). In the second round, "Wars for Nothing" performed by Boglárka Csemer – Boggie was selected as the winner via a public vote consisting of votes submitted through SMS and mobile app. 145,000 votes were registered in the second round.

Advanced to the second round Winner

Final – First Round – 28 February 2015
R/O	Artist	Song	M. Rúzsa	J. Csiszár	Pierrot	P. Rákay	Total	Place
1	Bálint Gájer	"That's How It Goes"	0	0	0	0	0	7
2	Boglárka Csemer – Boggie	"Wars for Nothing"	10	0	8	6	24	2
3	Spoon	"Keep Marching On"	0	10	0	10	20	3
4	Kati Wolf	"Ne engedj el"	8	4	0	4	16	5
5	Ádám Szabó	"Give Me Your Love"	6	8	6	8	28	1
6	Passed	"Mesmerize"	0	0	0	0	0	7
7	Ív	"Fire"	0	0	4	0	4	6
8	Zoltán Mujahid	"Beside You"	4	6	10	0	20	3

Final – Second Round – 28 February 2015
Artist	Song
Boglárka Csemer – Boggie	"Wars for Nothing"
Zoltán Mujahid	"Beside You"
Spoon	"Keep Marching On"
Ádám Szabó	"Give Me Your Love"

== At Eurovision ==
According to Eurovision rules, all nations with the exceptions of the host country and the "Big Five" (France, Germany, Italy, Spain and the United Kingdom) are required to qualify from one of two semi-finals in order to compete for the final; the top ten countries from each semi-final progress to the final. In the 2015 contest, Australia also competed directly in the final as an invited guest nation. The European Broadcasting Union (EBU) split up the competing countries into five different pots based on voting patterns from previous contests, with countries with favourable voting histories put into the same pot. On 26 January 2015, a special allocation draw was held which placed each country into one of the two semi-finals, as well as which half of the show they would perform in. Hungary was placed into the first semi-final, to be held on 19 May 2015, and was scheduled to perform in the second half of the show.

Once all the competing songs for the 2015 contest had been released, the running order for the semi-finals was decided by the shows' producers rather than through another draw, so that similar songs were not placed next to each other. Hungary was set to perform in position 10, following the entry from Serbia and before the entry from Belarus.

Both the semi-finals and the final were broadcast in Hungary on Duna TV with commentary by Gábor Gundel Takács. The contest was previously broadcast on M1; however, due to restructuring within MTVA, M1 became a news channel on 15 March 2015, while all entertainment shows were shifted to Duna TV. The Hungarian spokesperson, who announced the Hungarian votes during the final, was Csilla Tatár.

=== Semi-final ===
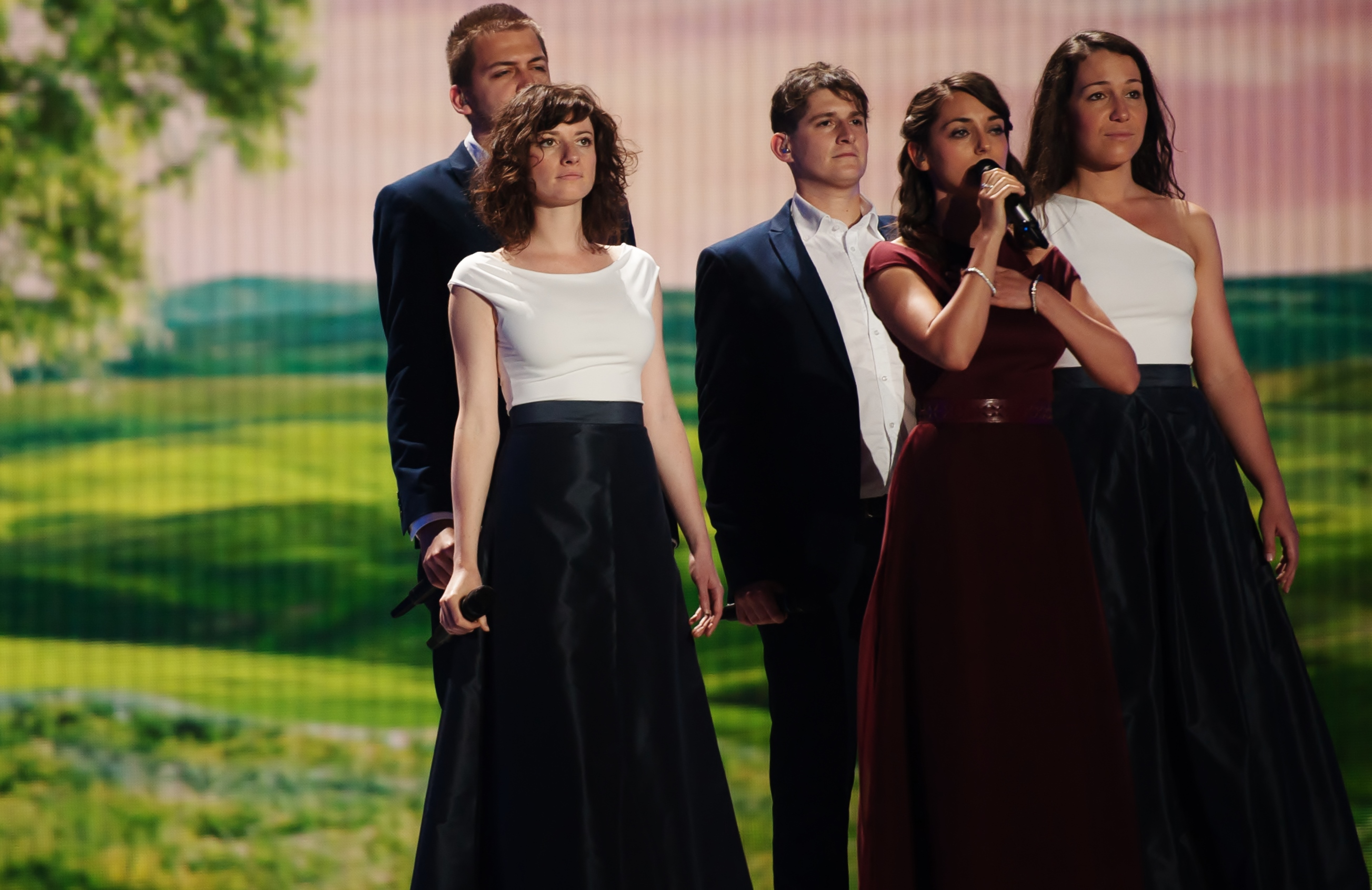
Boggie at a dress rehearsal for the first semi-final

Boggie took part in technical rehearsals on 12 and 15 May, followed by dress rehearsals on 18 and 19 May. This included the jury final where professional juries of each country, responsible for 50 percent of each country's vote, watched and voted on the competing entries.

The stage show featured Boggie in a long crimson dress with two female backing vocalists in dark blue dresses with light coloured tops and two male backing vocalists in dark suits. The staging for the song was minimalistic with a story being told through the images displayed on the background LED screens. The performance began in a dark setting with a single spotlight on Boggie and then transitioned to a starry sky and images of the Solar System focusing on Earth. The LED screens then displayed an arsenal of guns rotating to form a tree, finally transitioning into a scenic view of meadows and blue skies. On stage, Boggie was joined by four backing vocalists: Krisztina Szeder-Szabó, Orsi Sapszon, Milán Szakonyi and Domonkos Dely.

At the end of the show, Hungary was announced as having finished in the top ten and subsequently qualifying for the grand final. It was later revealed that Hungary placed eighth in the semi-final, receiving a total of 67 points.

=== Final ===
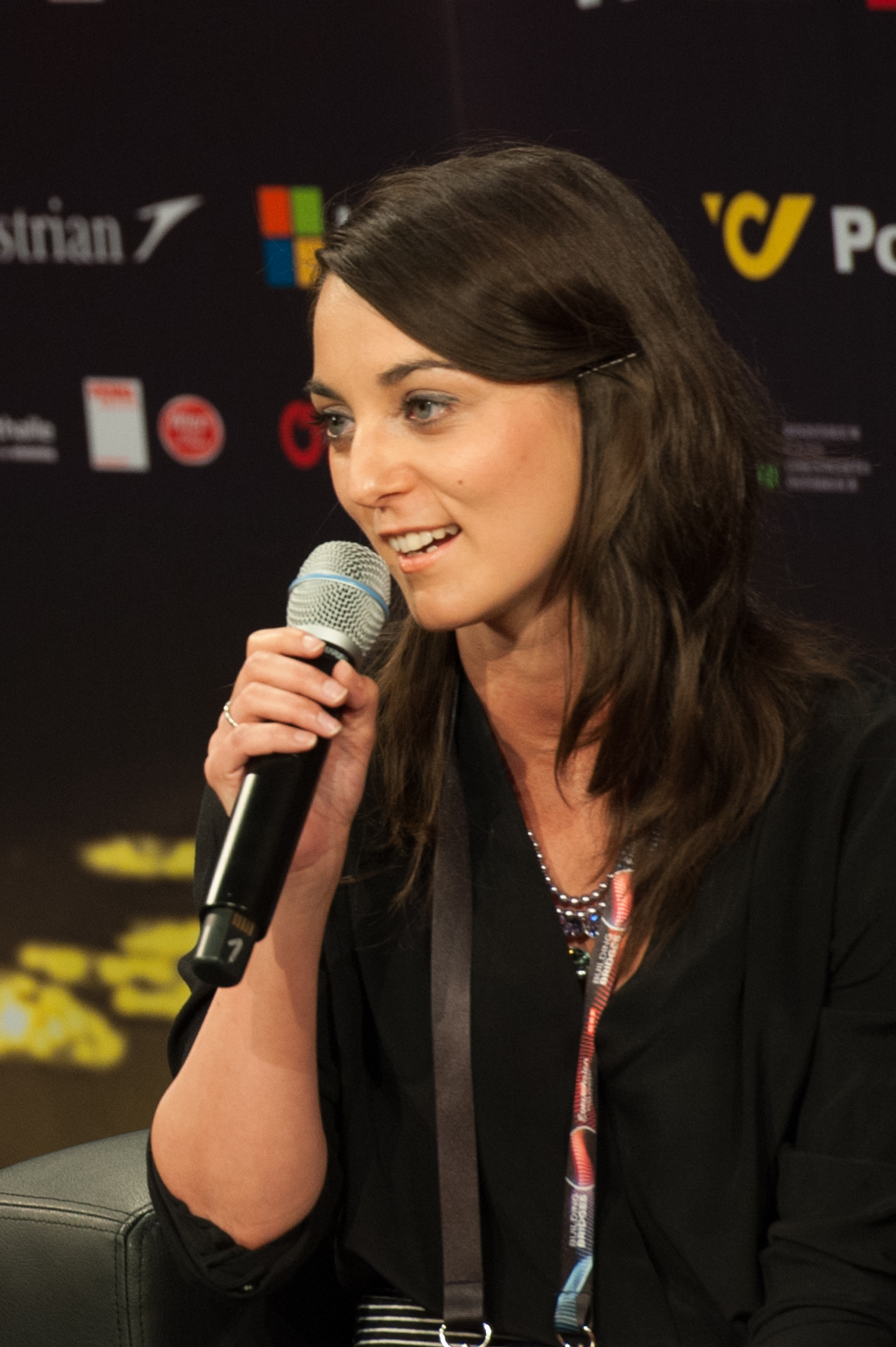
Boggie during a press meet and greet

Shortly after the first semi-final, a winner's press conference was held for the ten qualifying countries. As part of this press conference, the qualifying artists took part in a draw to determine which half of the grand final they would subsequently participate in. This draw was done in the order the countries were announced during the semi-final. Hungary was drawn to compete in the second half. Following this draw, the shows' producers decided upon the running order of the final, as they had done for the semi-finals. Hungary was subsequently placed to perform in position 22, following the entry from Spain and before the entry from Georgia.

Boggie once again took part in dress rehearsals on 22 and 23 May before the final, including the jury final where the professional juries cast their final votes before the live show. Boggie performed a repeat of her semi-final performance during the final on 23 May. At the conclusion of the voting, Hungary finished in twentieth place with 19 points.

=== Voting ===
Voting during the three shows consisted of 50 percent public televoting and 50 percent from a jury deliberation. The jury consisted of five music industry professionals who were citizens of the country they represent, with their names published before the contest to ensure transparency. This jury was asked to judge each contestant based on: vocal capacity; the stage performance; the song's composition and originality; and the overall impression by the act. In addition, no member of a national jury could be related in any way to any of the competing acts in such a way that they cannot vote impartially and independently. The individual rankings of each jury member were released shortly after the grand final.

Following the release of the full split voting by the EBU after the conclusion of the competition, it was revealed that Hungary had placed twenty-second with the public televote and seventeenth with the jury vote. In the public vote, Hungary scored 21 points, while with the jury vote, Hungary scored 29 points.

Below is a breakdown of points awarded to Hungary and awarded by Hungary in the first semi-final and grand final of the contest, and the breakdown of the jury voting and televoting conducted during the two shows:

==== Points awarded to Hungary ====
Points awarded to Hungary (Semi-final 1)
Score	Country
12 points	Estonia
10 points	Romania
8 points	Serbia
7 points	Finland
6 points	France
5 points	Austria
4 points	Belgium; Denmark; Netherlands
3 points	Albania
2 points	Australia; Russia
1 point	

Points awarded to Hungary (Final)
Score	Country
12 points	
10 points	
8 points	Estonia
7 points	
6 points	
5 points	
4 points	Romania; San Marino
3 points	
2 points	
1 point	Czech Republic; France; Germany

==== Points awarded by Hungary ====
Points awarded by Hungary (Semi-final 1)
Score	Country
12 points	Russia
10 points	Belgium
8 points	Estonia
7 points	Denmark
6 points	Georgia
5 points	Romania
4 points	Serbia
3 points	Greece
2 points	Finland
1 point	Albania

Points awarded by Hungary (Final)
Score	Country
12 points	Belgium
10 points	Sweden
8 points	Australia
7 points	Estonia
6 points	Russia
5 points	Latvia
4 points	Norway
3 points	Georgia
2 points	Italy
1 point	Romania

==== Detailed voting results ====
The following members comprised the Hungarian jury:

- Tamás Z. Marosi (Pierrot; jury chairperson) – singer-songwriter, music producer, game designer
- Mátyás Milkovics – composer, music producer
- Odett Polgár (Odett) – singer-songwriter
- Róbert Hrutka – guitarist, singer, composer, orchestrator, musician
- Juli Fábián – singer, songwriter, lyricist

Detailed voting results from Hungary (Semi-final 1)
R/O	Country	Pierrot	M. Milkovics	Odett	R. Hrutka	J. Fábián	Jury Rank	Televote Rank	Combined Rank	Points
01	Moldova	9	15	14	7	14	13	11	14	
02	Armenia	11	14	13	14	9	14	9	12	
03	Belgium	7	2	1	2	4	1	5	2	10
04	Netherlands	6	9	12	13	1	7	14	11	
05	Finland	14	5	4	15	10	12	4	9	2
06	Greece	2	6	8	10	2	5	10	8	3
07	Estonia	4	7	2	3	13	6	1	3	8
08	Macedonia	8	13	15	12	15	15	15	15	
09	Serbia	12	10	3	9	12	8	6	7	4
10	Hungary									
11	Belarus	10	8	11	6	11	10	13	13	
12	Russia	5	3	10	1	8	4	2	1	12
13	Denmark	1	4	7	8	6	3	7	4	7
14	Albania	15	12	9	5	5	9	12	10	1
15	Romania	13	11	5	11	7	11	3	6	5
16	Georgia	3	1	6	4	3	2	8	5	6

Detailed voting results from Hungary (Final)
R/O	Country	Pierrot	M. Milkovics	Odett	R. Hrutka	J. Fábián	Jury Rank	Televote Rank	Combined Rank	Points
01	Slovenia	18	15	24	15	18	22	14	18	
02	France	11	25	19	24	21	23	26	26	
03	Israel	20	17	18	9	25	18	7	13	
04	Estonia	16	6	2	6	20	9	2	4	7
05	United Kingdom	14	26	14	11	24	21	21	22	
06	Armenia	22	24	25	25	13	25	18	24	
07	Lithuania	25	23	15	10	12	16	24	20	
08	Serbia	23	13	10	14	23	15	9	12	
09	Norway	6	2	9	13	14	7	13	7	4
10	Sweden	10	4	7	3	1	2	4	2	10
11	Cyprus	5	10	17	7	5	8	20	15	
12	Australia	4	8	5	8	3	4	6	3	8
13	Belgium	15	3	1	2	4	3	3	1	12
14	Austria	8	12	16	17	7	10	19	16	
15	Greece	2	9	20	23	8	11	25	19	
16	Montenegro	24	20	26	26	26	26	17	23	
17	Germany	3	18	21	18	6	12	11	11	
18	Poland	9	11	8	22	16	13	12	14	
19	Latvia	1	1	3	4	2	1	10	6	5
20	Romania	21	21	11	12	11	14	8	10	1
21	Spain	12	14	22	21	17	17	16	17	
22	Hungary									
23	Georgia	7	5	4	5	10	5	15	8	3
24	Azerbaijan	17	19	23	19	22	24	23	25	
25	Russia	13	7	6	1	9	6	5	5	6
26	Albania	26	16	12	16	19	19	22	21	
27	Italy	19	22	13	20	15	20	1	9	2
