= Čantavir =

Čantavir Чантавир (Serbian) Csantavér (Hungarian)
- Village (Selo)
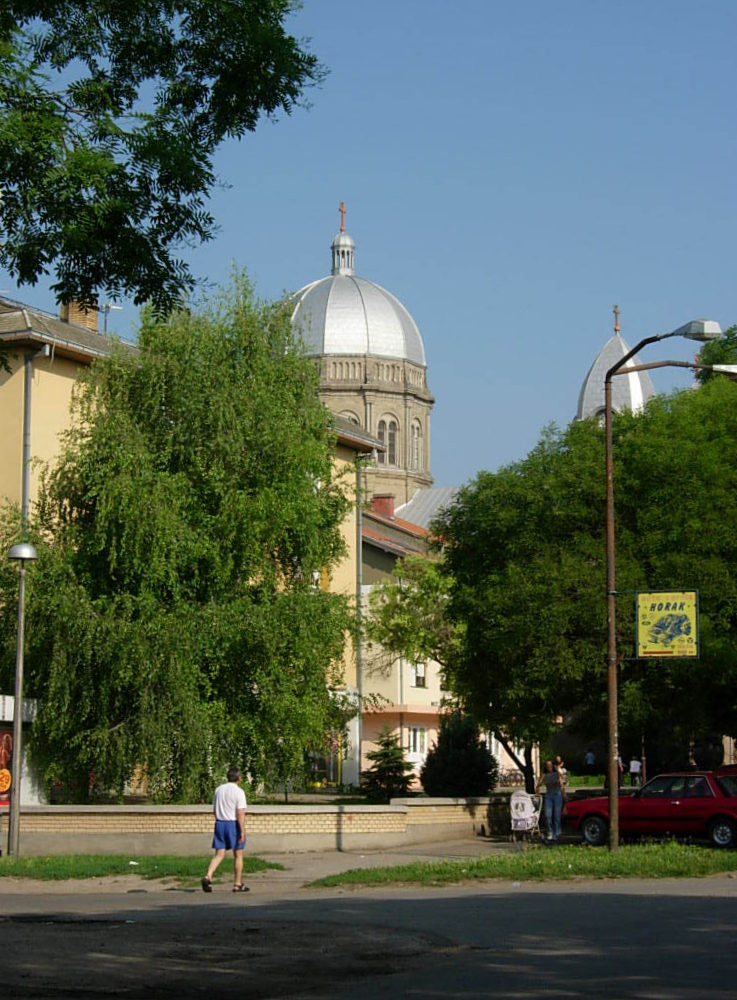
- The Saint Anthony of Padua Catholic Church

- Location within Vojvodina Location within Serbia Location within Europe
- Coordinates: 45°55′N 19°46′E
- Country: Serbia
- Province: Vojvodina

Area
  - Total: 49.60 km^{2} (19.15 sq mi)
- Elevation: 121 m (397 ft)

Population (2022)
  - Total: 5,545
  - Density: 111.8/km^{2} (289.5/sq mi)
- Time zone: UTC+1 (CET)
  - Summer (DST): UTC+2 (CEST)

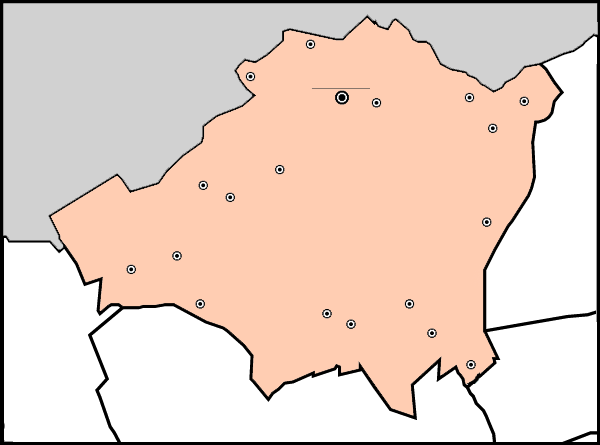

Čantavir (Serbian Cyrillic: Чантавир, Hungarian: Csantavér, Croatian: Čantavir) is a village located in the administrative area of the City of Subotica, in the North Bačka District, Vojvodina, Serbia. It has a population of 5,545 inhabitants (2022) and is the largest village with Hungarian ethnic majority in the country.

== Demographics ==
=== Historical population ===
- 1921: 8,969
- 1931: 11,287
- 1948: 9,397
- 1953: 9,262
- 1961: 9,341
- 1971: 9,085
- 1981: 8,596
- 1991: 7,940
- 2002: 7,178
- 2011: 6,951
- 2022: 5,545

=== Ethnic groups ===
According to data from the 2022 census, ethnic groups in the village include:

- 4,854 (87.5%) Hungarians
- 264 (4.7%) Roma
- 70 (1.2%) Serbs
- Others/Undeclared/Unknown

== School and culture ==
There is an elementary school in Čantavir. From 1996 "Primavera" became a mixed voice chamber choir "Musica Viva". They have tried to bring live music to the hearts of their audience at concerts, festivals and other events. On their programme there are numerous compositions from all areas of musical history.

== People ==
- József Törley (1858-1907), Hungarian business magnate, investor, philanthropist
- Szilveszter Matuska (1892–?), serial killer
- Heni Dér (born 1986), Hungarian singer

== Sister cities ==
- Borsec, Romania
- Csanytelek, Hungary
- Mezőberény, Hungary
- Nemesnádudvar, Hungary
- Szajol, Hungary
- Tépe, Hungary

== Literature ==
- Slobodan Ćurčić, Broj stanovnika Vojvodine, Novi Sad, 1996.
