= Zoltán Mujahid =

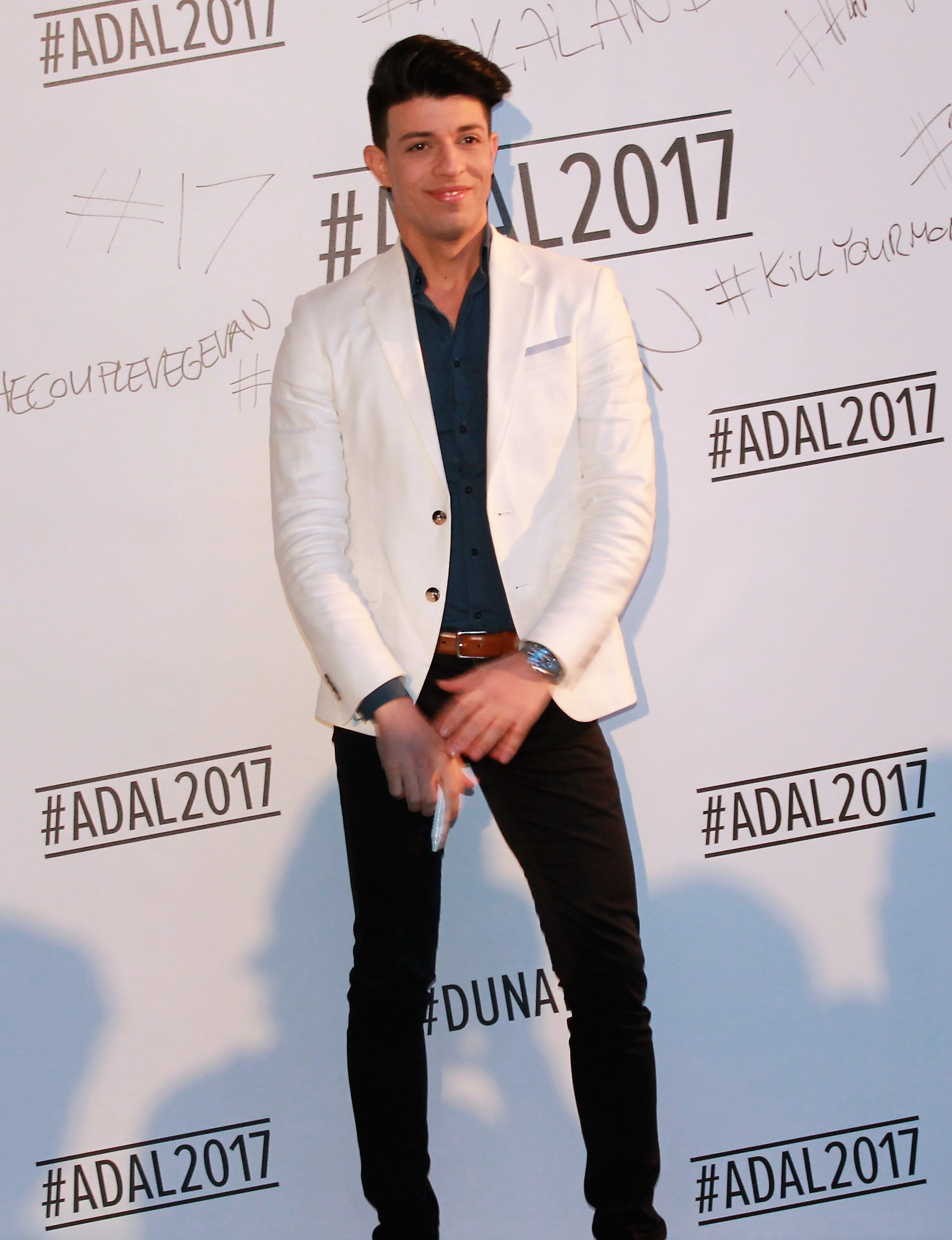
- Zoltán Mujahid in 2016

Background information
- Born: 8 August 1979 (age 46); Karachi, Pakistan
- Occupation(s): Singer, voice teacher
- Instrument: vocals
- Years active: 2003–present

Zoltán Mujahid (born 8 August 1979) is a Pakistani-Hungarian singer and music teacher. He is most notable for coming in 10th place in the first series of Megasztár and participating in A Dal 2015.

== Personal life ==
Zoltán Mujahid was born on 8 August 1979 in Karachi, Pakistan to Pakistani father Iqbal Mujahid and Hungarian mother Klára Somogyi. He has three siblings: Tamás (Altamash), Atilla, and Aneela. In 2012, he publicly came out as gay.

He first studied South Asian music in Karachi for five years, and held many high positions in local talent shows. At age eleven, he, his mom, and his siblings moved to Budapest in his mother's native country, where he learned Hungarian.

During his time in primary school, he learned classical piano. In 1995, he became involved with major plays at the Petőfi Musical Studio. At age seventeen, Zoltán began to take vocal lessons with the help of fellow teacher Zsuzsa Kósa. He graduated from Petőfi Sándor secondary school in 2000, and was admitted to the Lauschmann Gyula Conservatory of Jazz Music, which he graduated from in 2003. He went onto the Jazz department of the Franz Liszt Academy of Music, where he graduated in 2008.

== Professional career ==
In 2003, he was in the top 10 of the American Idol-esque show Megasztár, in its first season.

In December 2014, Mujahid was one of the names announced to partake in A Dal 2015, the Hungarian national selection for the Eurovision Song Contest, with his song Beside You. He passed through the third heat on 14 February 2015, and the first semi-final on 21 February. He progressed to the final, and on February 28, was one of the entries which the juries voted to be eligible to go to the Eurovision Song Contest 2015, but fellow contestant Boggie was chosen by the televote to go to the Eurovision.

In December 2016, Mujahid was announced again to be participating in A Dal, this time in A Dal 2017 with the song On My Own. He was eliminated in the second heat.

== Discography ==
- Első vallomás (LP, 2005)
- Első hó (single, 2008)
- Túlélő (single, 2010)
- Három év (single, 2012)
- Beside You (single, 2015)
- On My Own (single, 2016)

== Sources (in Hungarian) ==
- Hivatalos honlap
- joyride.hu
- allmusic.hu
- blikk.hu
- bulvar.ma.hu
