= Édes méreg =

Édes Méreg

Studio album by Ibolya Oláh
- Released: 12 November 2005
- Genre: Pop
- Labels: Sony BMG, Hungary
- Producers: Péter Geszti, Norbert Szűcs, Tamás Orbán, Péter Novák

Ibolya Oláh chronology
Egy sima, egy fordított (2004)	Édes Méreg (2005)	El merem mondani (2010)

Édes méreg is the second album by the Hungarian singer and Megasztár runner-up, Ibolya Oláh. The album was released on November 12, 2005.

The album went platinum in Hungary during 2005.

== Track listing ==
1. "Magyarország" (Dragone/Tardos/Amesse/Dupere–Péter Geszti; cover of "Alegría" by Cirque du Soleil)
2. "Édes méreg" (Norbert Szűcs–Tamás Orbán)
3. "Még él még" (Ibolya Oláh-Péter Novák)
4. "A hiba" (Novák)
5. "Marionett" (Szűcs–Orbán)
6. "Belső bolygó" (Oláh–Orbán)
7. "Papírkutya" (Novák)
8. "Nézz vissza" (Oláh–Szűcs)
9. "Eddig, baby" (Oláh–Csajtay)
10. "Ibolyavirág" (Gábor Presser)
11. "Öröm és könny" (Presser–Dusán Sztevanovity)
12. "Valamit valamiért" (Roy–Novák)
