= Egy sima, egy fordított =

Studio album by Ibolya Oláh
- Released: 2004
- Genre: Pop
- Labels: Sony BMG, Hungary
- Producer: Péter Geszti

Ibolya Oláh chronology
Egy sima, egy fordított (2004)	Édes méreg (2005)

Egy sima, egy fordított is the first album by Ibolya Oláh, the runner-up in the 2003–2004 edition of Megasztár.

The album has gone platinum in Hungary after sales of 20,000 (of a total population of 10 million).

== Track listing ==
1. "Nem kell"
2. "Mi lesz velem"
3. "Csak egy perc"
4. "Embertelen dal"
5. "Most"
6. "A szerelemnek múlnia kell"
7. "Papa, ha félsz"
8. "Majd elfújja a szél"
9. "Találjmárrám"
10. "Ördögöd van"
11. "A lélek katonái"
12. "Jó estét nyár, jó estét szerelem"
13. "Hazám"
