= Balázs Farkas =

Balázs Farkas may refer to:

- Balázs Farkas (footballer, born 1978), Hungarian footballer for Sopron, Rákospalota and Diósgyőr
- Balázs Farkas (footballer, born 1979), Hungarian international footballer for Győr, Újpest, Fehérvár/Videoton, Vasas, Kecskemét and Mezőkövesd
- Balázs Farkas (footballer, born 1988), Hungarian international footballer for Nyíregyháza, Dynamo Kyiv, Videoton, Debrecen, Győr and MTK
- Balázs Farkas (squash player) (born 1997), Hungarian squash player
- Balázs Farkas-Jenser (born 1990), Hungarian singer, guitarist, and songwriter
