= Depresszió =

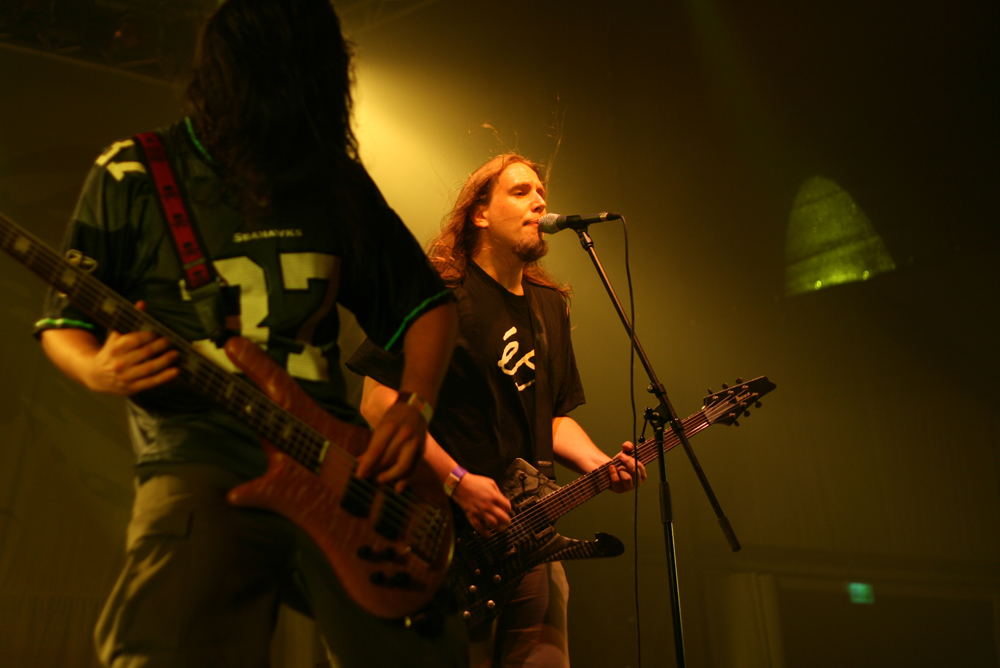
- Depresszió performing in 2009

Background information
- Origin: Hungary
- Genres: Metal, rock
- Years active: 1999–present
- Members: Ferenc Halász; Ádám Hartmann; Dávid Nagy; Zoltán Kovács
- Past members: Roland Reichert; Miklós "Soda" Pálffy

Depresszió (English: Depression) is a Hungarian metal and rock band, formed in late 1999 by Ferenc Halász (vocals and guitar), Dávid Nagy (drums), and Roland Reichert (bass), with Ádám Hartmann joining in shortly afterwards to create the band. In 2000, they first got their own concert. In August 2000, their first full-length album was recorded. They have released seven studio albums, one EP, and three DVDs. In late 2013, they announced to participate in A Dal 2014 with the song Csak a zene, which managed to get to the final, but not qualify for the super-final.

== Band members ==
- Ferenc Halász — vocals, guitar
- Ádám Hartmann — guitar, backing vocals
- Dávid Nagy — drums, percussion
- Zoltán Kovács — bass, growls

=== Past members ===
- Miklós "Soda" Pálffy — sampler, keyboards, vocals
- Roland Reichert — bass

== Discography ==
=== Studio albums ===
- Tiszta erőből (2000)
- Amíg tart (2002)
- Egy életen át (2004)
- Az ébredés útján (2006)
- Egyensúly (2008)
- Vízválasztó (2011)
- A folyamat zajlik (2014)
- Válaszok után... (2017)
- Nehéz szó (2019)

=== Concert albums ===
- Csak a zene (2013)

=== Selection albums ===
- Nincs jobb kor (2010)

=== Singles ===
- Még1X (2006)

=== Demo album ===
- Messiás (demó) (1999)

=== Videos ===
- Depi birthdayVD (2005)
- DE 3,14 Live (2008)
- 10 éves jubileumi koncert (2011)
- 15 éves jubileumi koncert (2016)
