= Passed (band) =

Hungarian band

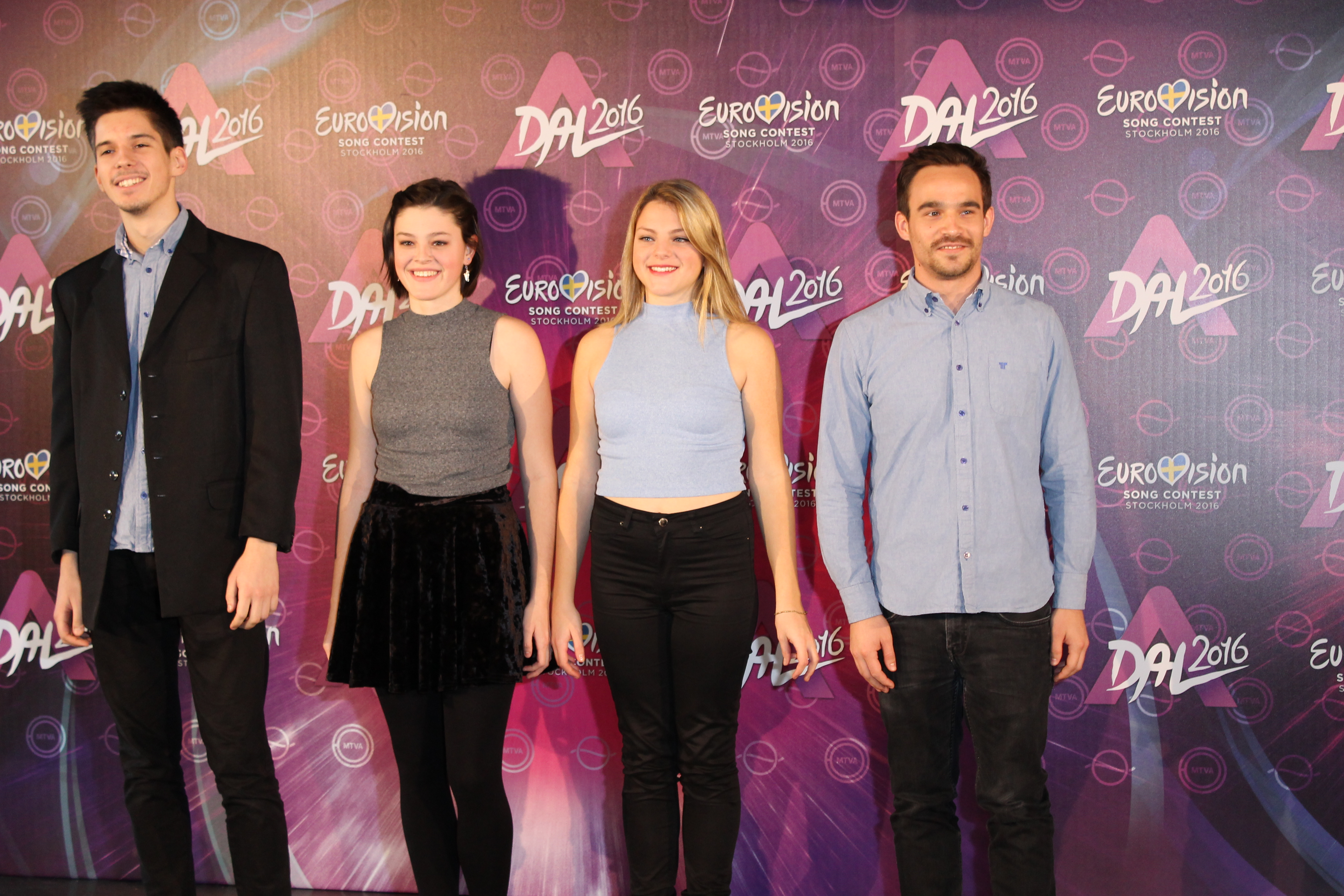
- Passed in 2015

Background information
- Origin: Hungary
- Genres: Indie pop; indietronica; dream pop
- Years active: 2014–present
- Members: Dorottya Nizalowski; Fanni Nizalowski; Áron Farkas; Levente Szabó
- Past members: Dávid Godzsák

Passed is a Hungarian indie electronic pop band. Their influences include Gabor Szabo and Carlos Santana. The members are twins of Polish origin, singer Dorottya and harpist Fanni Nizalowski from Budapest, bassist Dávid Godzsák, an ethnic Hungarian from Királyhelmec, Slovakia, and producer Levente Szabó from Sárospatak. Godzsák left to pursue a career with other musical groups and was replaced by Áron Farkas. One of their main goals is to bring back the harp into modern popular culture. The band's first single was released in June 2015, On The Grind, and was played on the radio.

== History ==
The Nizalowski sisters began playing the harp in 2004. In 2014, they graduated from the József Záborszky-founded Zugló Szent István Music Secondary School. Their teachers include Katalin Nagy and Deborah Sipkay. Their favorite subjects were choir, folk music, music literature and music history, with their music theory proficiency having an effect on their songs.

The twins performed at home and abroad with the choir of the school, the St. Stephen King Symphony Orchestra, the Zugló Philharmonic Orchestra and as a duo. They perform in schools, churches, elderly homes and corporate events. Their goal is to popularize the harp with the other instruments of popular culture. In this context, with their parents they created the first Harper's blog of 170 writers in Hungary, which contains biographies, interviews and musical history curiosities. They are inspired by the New York Harp Ensemble, founded by Aristid von Würtzler (1925-1997). They are also active in the Polish community in Hungary.

Farkas has been a bassist for ten years, and has been in numerous jazz, pop and rock formations during his career. In 2011, he graduated from the imPro Budapest Music School of Music.

Szabó studied and edited the school radio at Árpád Vezér Gymnasium in Sárospatak. Since 2001, he has played piano, has been writing songs since 2011. He is also a producer of imPro productions and as a music producer, he is also intensively interested in filmmaking. With thirteen years of folk dance, it is important for him to stay in rhythm, so he programs the drums carefully in his productive work. Godzsák and Szabó previously co-operated the GOMA formation. Their first album was released on 18 September 2014. It contains four images. One recording was made with American rapper None Like Joshua and Dorottya plays in this recording.

=== Mesmerize ===
The band is most notable for participating in A Dal 2015, the national selection for the Eurovision Song Contest 2015 with the song "Mesmerize". They reached the finals, but the song received no points from the judges, so the song was not eligible to be chosen to represent Hungary in the Eurovision.

== Members ==
- Dorottya Nizalowski (vocals)
- Fanni Nizalowski (acoustic harp, electronic harp)
- Áron Farkas (bass guitar)
- Levente Szabó (keyboards, electronic instruments)

== Resources (in Hungarian) ==
- Hárfák és Hárfások: Passed: Hárfá és pop
- URBNPLYR: “Olyan számokat írni, amiket mi szeretünk” urbanplayer.hu
- Recorder: "Minden helyzetből kihozni a maximumot" interjú recorder.hu
