= Boggie =

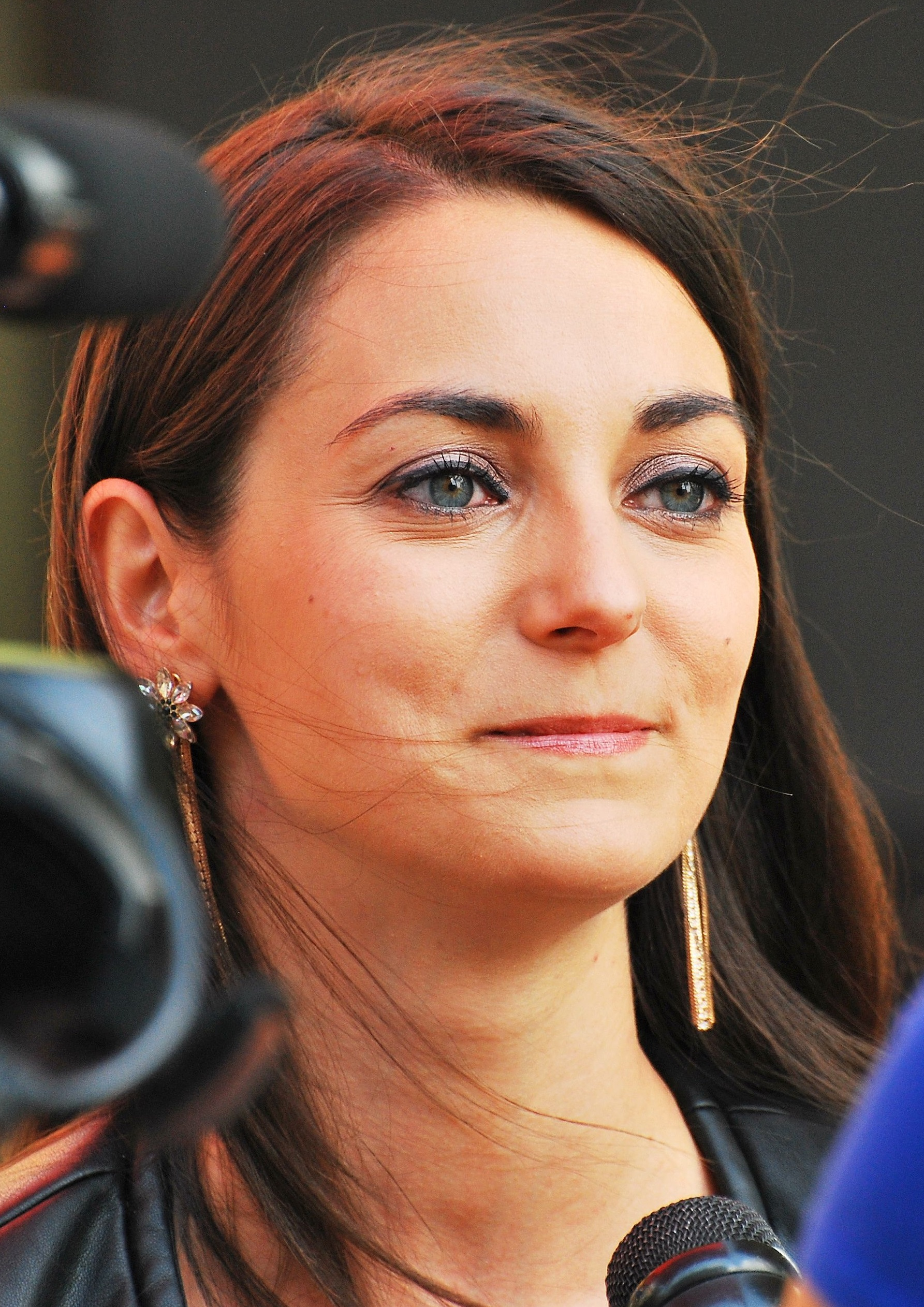
- Boggie in Pécs, Hungary (2018)

Background information
- Also known as: Boggie
- Born: Boglárka Csemer; 30 November 1986 (age 39); Budapest, Hungary
- Genres: Pop
- Occupation: singer
- Instrument: vocals
- Years active: 2009–present
- Label: Tom-Tom Records
- Website: www.boggieofficial.com

Boglárka Csemer (Hungarian pronunciation: [ˈboɡlaːrkɒ ˈt͡ʃɛmɛr], born 30 November 1986), known professionally as Boggie, is a Hungarian singer and songwriter. Boggie rose to prominence in 2014, when her song "Nouveau Parfum" (Hungarian: Parfüm), from her self-titled debut studio album, went viral online. The song became a number-one hit in Hungary, while also charting internationally.

Boggie represented Hungary in the Eurovision Song Contest 2015 with the song "Wars for Nothing", where she placed 20th in the final.

== Musical career ==
=== 2014–present: Boggie era ===
Boggie rose to major prominence in early January 2014 after the release of the music video to her debut single "Nouveau Parfum" (French for "New Perfume"). The video was picked up by media outlets in various countries including the UK and United States. The video shows the singer being extensively retouched while she sings the song, which is a darker, French rewrite of the song's Hungarian version entitled "Parfüm". Both versions are extracted from Boglárka's self-titled debut album entitled Boggie, released in 2013. The video and its message are similar to the Body Evolution viral video created for GlobalDemocracy.com to encourage the introduction of mandatory disclaimers on retouched images in popular media. Much like the model in Body Evolution, by the end of the video Boglárka bears little resemblance to her unaltered appearance at the start. A brief split-screen comparison shows the viewer how drastically different the final result is.

Two verses in "Nouveau Parfum" consist of Boggie reeling off a list of designer label perfumes and asking which she should choose, before questioning why she should have to make a choice at all and asking who is making her choose. Boggie then counters this pressure with the lines, "Je ne suis pas leur produit / De beauté, d’préciosité / Ils ne peuvent pas me changer" ("I am not their product / Of beauty, of preciousness / They cannot change me").

"Parfüm", in contrast, does not reel off the names of thirty designer labels. Instead, the Hungarian version contains lyrics hoping to inspire the listener to set themselves free of the intoxicating yet harmful effects of all that is unnatural and unattainable: "Parfümnek varázsa, szirmoknak virága / Vágyaink kínzása, selymeknek siklása / Keletnek fűszere, buja kis meséje / Úgy elbódít / Most mind kidobom / Torz tükröm elhajítom / Kabátom szárnyra nyitom / Lélegezz szabadon" ("Perfume's magic, Petals' flowers / Torturing desires, gliding of silk / The East's spices, their lustful little tale / Dazes me so / Now I'm throwing all of them out / I'm casting my distorted mirror away / My coat opens into wings / Breathe freely"). A YouTube fan video splicing both the Hungarian and French versions together offers not only a chance to hear portions of each song, but also further shows the progress of photo manipulation into the video realm.

Reflecting the popularity of "Parfüm" and "Nouveau Perfum", a third version was also recorded by Boggie in English entitled "Perfume".

=== Eurovision Song Contest ===
Boggie represented Hungary in the Eurovision Song Contest 2015 with the song "Wars for Nothing". On 19 May 2015 she qualified for the event's grand final, which was held on 23 May 2015 in Vienna, Austria, and finished in twentieth place, receiving 19 points.

== Discography ==
=== Singles ===
Title	Year	Peak chart positions			Album
Title	Year	HUN	AUT	ICE	Album
"Parfüm" / "Nouveau Parfum"	2014	1	—	—	Boggie
"Wars for Nothing"	2015	16	64	45	All Is One Is All
"—" denotes a single that did not chart or was not released in that territory.
Run to the River	2017				
Végtelen	2017				
Füst	2021				
Messziről jött ember	2022				
Árnyék	2022				
Fragilité	2023				
Beauté	2024				

=== Albums ===
Year	Album	Peak chart positions
Year	Album	MAHASZ Top 40
2013	Boggie: Release date: 13 April 2013; Publisher: Tom-Tom Records	4
2014	All Is One Is All: Release date: 24 October 2014; Publisher: Tom-Tom Records	5
2017	3: Release date: 23 September 2017; Publisher: Tom-Tom Records	
2022	Fragilité	

Awards and achievements
Preceded by András Kállay-Saunders with "Running"	Hungary in the Eurovision Song Contest; 2015	Succeeded by Freddie with "Pioneer"
