= Karmapolis =

Hungarian band

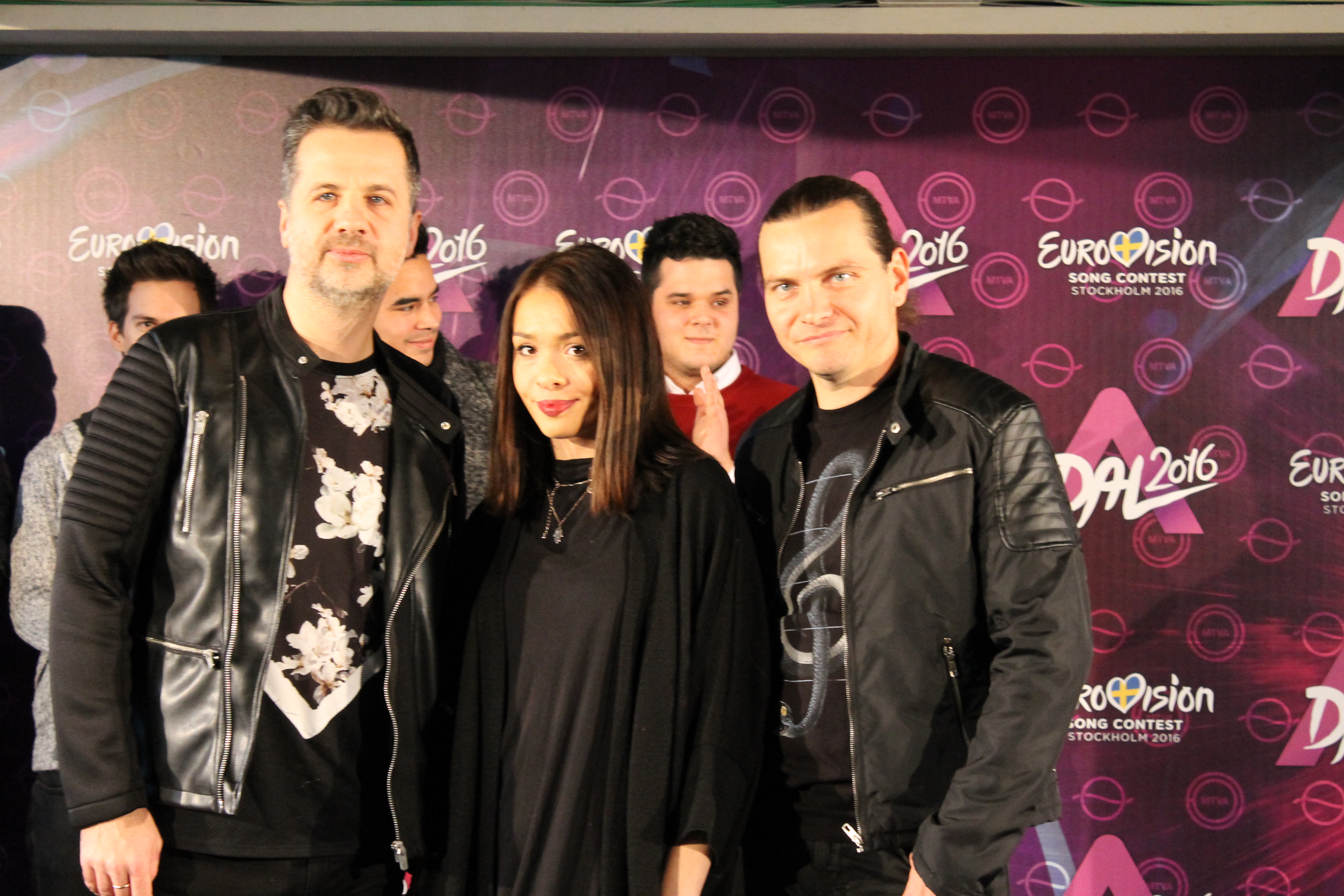
- Karmapolis (excluding Szabolcs Szipszer) with Böbe Szécsi in 2015

Background information
- Origin: Hungary
- Genres: Electro, Indie
- Years active: 2010 - present
- Members: András Kenyeres; Szabolcs Szipszer; Gábor Lipi

Karmapolis is a Hungarian electro Indie band, with András Kenyeres with the vocals, guitar, piano, synthesizer, producing and songwriting, Szabolcs Szipszer at the synthesizers, drums, and producing, and Gábor Lipi at the bass.

== History ==
The band has performed in many shows at home in Hungary and abroad. Their songs vocals, drums, guitars and synthesizers variously complement each other to form a uniform mixture. They debuted on the radio station Pesti Est, and have gone on to go onto more notable radio stations such as Petőfi Rádió and the national radio station Kossuth Rádió.

The band was one of the names selected to attempt to win A Dal 2015, the selection for Hungary in the Eurovision Song Contest 2015, with the song Time is Now. The song progressed from the first heat on 24 January with 37 points to the first semi-final on 14 February, being eliminated there. They also performed in A Dal 2016, this time with Böbe Szécsi with the song Hold On To. They reached the semi-finals before being eliminated.
