= Gyula Éliás =

Hungarian singer

Gyula Éliás Jr.
- Also known as: Éliás Jr.
- Genres: Jazz
- Occupation: Singer
- Instrument: vocals
- Years active: 2005–present

Gyula Éliás, more popularly known as Éliás Jr., is a Hungarian musician, singer, and voice teacher.

== Musical career ==
He was a member of several orchestras. He is the leader of the singing department at the Erkel Gyula Újpest School of Jazz. In 2003, he graduated from the Franz Liszt Academy of Music in the Jazz vocals department.

He sang as a guest artist for many bands & collectives, including: Studio 11, Budapest Jazz Orchestra, Jazzpression, Greg Földvári, Laci Gaspar, Eszter Váci, Frank Zappa tribute band, Tamás Takács, Jenő Fekete, Jackie Orszánszky, Tamás Somló, Charlie, Magdolna Rúzsa, Vera Toth, Viktor Varga, and McDc.

=== Hungary in the Eurovision Song Contest ===
Éliás has tried three times to represent his home country Hungary in the Eurovision Song Contest: Firstly in 1996, with the song Jó éjszakát, tying in last place (9th with four points). The eventual representative, Gjon Delhusa, was eliminated in the pre-qualifying round in the Eurovision Song Contest 1996. The second time was nearly twenty years later, with the new format of A Dal 2013. He attempted again with the song Mindhalálig várni rád, and was eliminated in the heats. He tried for a third time in A Dal 2015, this time in English and in collaboration with the jazz band Fourtissimo with the song Run to you, this time only getting to the semi-finals.

== Awards ==
- Gundel Art Award (2006)
- Radio Jazzy Song Contest, the best male singer award (2009)
- Artisjus Prize (2012)

== Discography ==
- Best of (1999)
- Non stop (2002)
- Jól vagyok (2007)
- Boldog vagyok (2010)
