= Szilveszter Matuska =

Mass Murderer

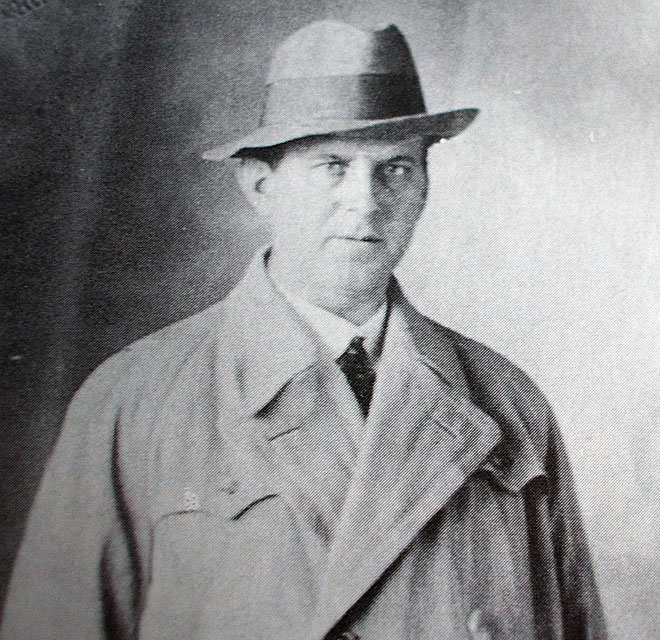
- Matuska, c. 1932
- Born: 29 January 1892; Csantavér, Kingdom of Hungary, Austria-Hungary
- Disappeared: 1945
- Motive: Possibly sexual gratification
- Conviction: Murder
- Penalty: Death; commuted to life imprisonment

Details
- Date: 13 September 1931
- Locations: Biatorbágy, Hungary
- Killed: 22
- Injured: 120+
- Weapon: Dynamite
- Date apprehended: 10 October 1931

Szilveszter Matuska (29 January 1892 – disappeared c. 1945) was a Hungarian mass murderer and mechanical engineer who made two successful and at least two unsuccessful attempts to derail passenger trains in Hungary, Germany and Austria in 1930 and 1931. He was born in Čantavir (now located in Serbia), and was ultimately imprisoned for his crimes but escaped under unclear circumstances; his ultimate fate is unknown.

== Crimes ==
Matuska made at least two failed attempts to derail trains in Austria in December 1930 and January 1931.

Matuska's first successful crime was the derailment of the Berlin-Basel express train south of Berlin on 8 August 1931. More than 100 people were injured, several of them seriously, but there were no deaths. Because of the discovery of a defaced Nazi newspaper at the scene of the crime, among other things, the attack was believed to have been politically motivated. A bounty of 100,000 reichsmark was put on the perpetrator.

Matuska's second and more notorious successful crime was the derailment of the Vienna Express headed towards Vienna as it was crossing the Biatorbágy bridge near Budapest at 12:20 am on 13 September 1931. Twenty-two people died and 120 others were injured, 17 of them severely.

Matuska carried out this crime by placing numerous sticks of dynamite in a brown fibre suitcase, which detonated at a viaduct due to the weight of the train, causing the engine and nine of the eleven coaches to plunge into a ravine 30 metres deep. Matuska was discovered at the scene of the crime but, passing himself off as a surviving passenger, he was released. Investigators in the three countries were on his trail, however, and he was arrested in Vienna one month later, on 10 October 1931, whereupon he soon confessed.

Matuska was tried and convicted in Austria for the two unsuccessful attempts. He was later extradited to Hungary on condition that he not be executed. He was found guilty of murder and sentenced to death, but the sentence was commuted to life imprisonment as agreed with Austria.

== Disappearance ==
Matuska reportedly escaped from jail in Vác in 1945. According to some reports, he served as an explosives expert during the latter stages of World War II; he was "borrowed" from the prison for 17 days, then returned. When Soviet troops were nearing Vác, the Germans released the prisoners, but Matuska and some other prisoners decided to wait for the Soviets. Allegedly he stayed on because he hoped that his Serbian language skills would enable him to communicate with the Russians. He posed as a surgeon, worked for a time with the Russian war hospital, and then moved on with the troops in January 1945. Later he apparently returned to Čantavir, his birthplace.

Fragments of testimony from various witnesses have been pieced together to form what is now known of Matuska's fate. On a Sunday he gave a "nationalist-flavoured sermon" to a crowd coming out of church. The next day he was captured by partisans and taken to Novi Sad. According to his uncle, he was buried in a mass grave in Subotica. Rumours have circulated that he moved to Western Germany and lived there until death in 1967 on the communist side in the Korean War, but there is no evidence to support this.

Matuska's motives remain unclear. His first attack was initially thought to have been politically motivated. At his trial, Matuska claimed to have been ordered to derail the express by God. Matuska has also been quoted as explaining his crimes by saying: "I wrecked trains because I like to see people die. I like to hear them scream." It was reported that he achieved orgasm while watching the trains he had sabotaged crash (a forensic examination of the trousers he had worn on the night of the fatal crash discovered evidence of semen stains).

== Popular culture ==
In 1990 Matuska became the subject of a song, "Sylvestre Matuschka", by the band Lard. A Hungarian film titled Merenylet was made in 1959 starring Lajos Basti and Antal Pager. A Hungarian/German TV film titled Viadukt was made in 1983 which was based on this case (English titled The Train Killer), starring Canadian actor Michael Sarrazin as Matuschka and Armin Mueller-Stahl as the lead investigator on the case. In 1993 Matuska became the subject of an art installation by Belgian artist Danny Devos.

== See also ==
- List of fugitives from justice who disappeared
