= Heni Dér =

Hungarian singer

- Born: Henrietta Dér; 17 April 1986 (age 40); Čantavir, SFR Yugoslavia
- Genres: Pop; R&B
- Occupation: Singer
- Instrument: vocals
- Years active: 2006–present

Henrietta "Heni" Dér (born 17 April 1986) is a Hungarian singer. She is best known for being the lead singer of the Hungarian band Sugarloaf, which started her solo career.

== Music career ==
Heni Dér came to light after she placed ninth in the first season of Megasztár. In 2006, she released her first album with the band Sugarloaf, following with a concert DVD in 2008, and in 2009, a documentary about the film, which was shown at a festival in 2011. In 2016, she performed on the fourth season of A nagy duett with Gábor Kucsera.

=== A Dal ===
In late 2013, Heni Dér was one of the names selected to participate in A Dal 2014, the national selection for Hungary in the Eurovision Song Contest, with the song Ég veled – Next please, which progressed only to the semi-finals, being eliminated then. She was again revealed in late 2014 to participate in the 2015 edition, this time with the song Ébresztő. She was eliminated from the heats.

== Discography ==
- Hajnalig még van idő
- Szingli lány
- Minden hozzád hajt
- Barbie
- Luffballon
- Vadvirág
- Dolce Vita
