= Bíborka Bocskor =

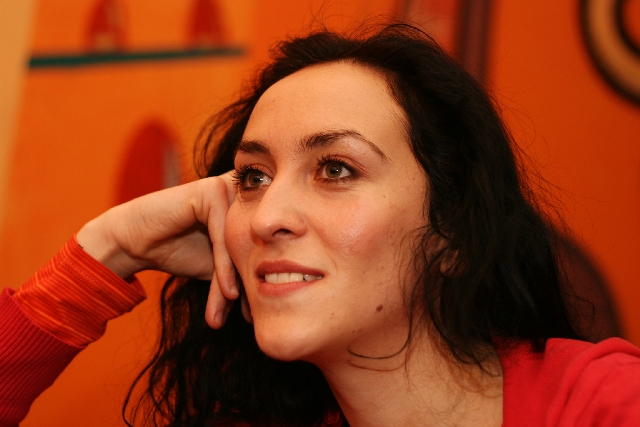
- Bocskor in 2010

Background information
- Born: 16 August 1982 (age 44); Sânmartin, Romania
- Origin: Hungarian
- Genre: alternative rock
- Occupation: Musician
- Instrument: Voice
- Years active: 2006–present

Bíborka Bocskor (born 16 August 1982) is a Transilvanian-born Hungarian singer and songwriter. She has been the frontwoman of alternative rock band Magashegyi Underground since 2006.

== Career ==
Bocskor was born on 16 August 1982 in Sânmartin (Csíkszentmárton), a village in the Transylvania region of Romania. Her parents owned a farm, and she would help with the crops and animals. She studied at the István Nagy Arts Lyceum in Miercurea Ciuc, then entered the University of Arts Târgu Mureș.

Bocskor quit her university studies in 2003 and moved to the Hungarian capital city, Budapest. In 2006, she was a semi-finalist in the pop contest show Megasztár. She joined Magashegyi Underground in that same year. Bocskor also wrote lyrics for several of the band's songs. She and the other band members discouraged their fans from SMS voting for them in the 2008 Hungarian Music Awards due to exorbitant messaging rates of 240 HUF per message.

Bocskor has written songs for Magashegyi Underground using poems by writers such as Péter Závada and Krisztina Tóth.

== Personal life ==
Bocskor's husband Lóránt Bocskor-Salló is a theatre actor and director; they met while in university, and moved together to Hungary. She is Catholic.

Bocskor suffers from endometriosis. She had her first child, a daughter, in 2020.
