= Ibolya Oláh =

Hungarian singer (born 1978)

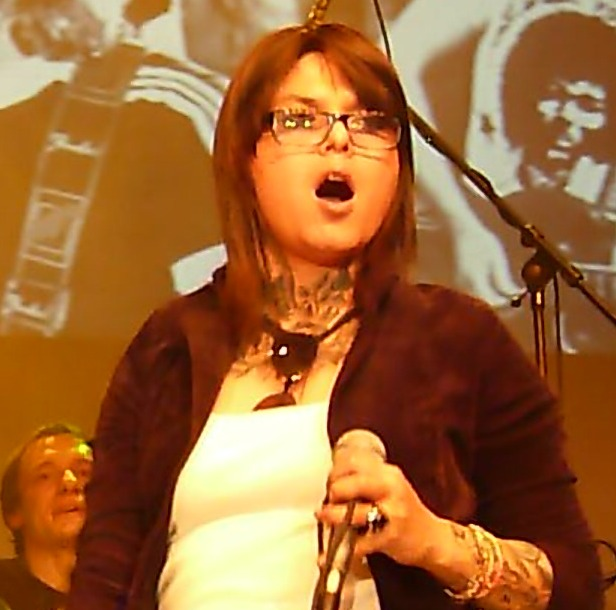
- Oláh performing in 2012

Background information
- Born: 31 January 1978 (age 48); Nyíregyháza, Hungary
- Genres: Pop, Rock
- Occupations: Singer, musician, entertainer
- Instrument: vocals
- Years active: 2003–present
- Label: Sony BMG

Ibolya Oláh (born 31 January 1978) is a Hungarian pop singer. She was the runner-up of the first series of Hungarian television singing competition series Megasztár.

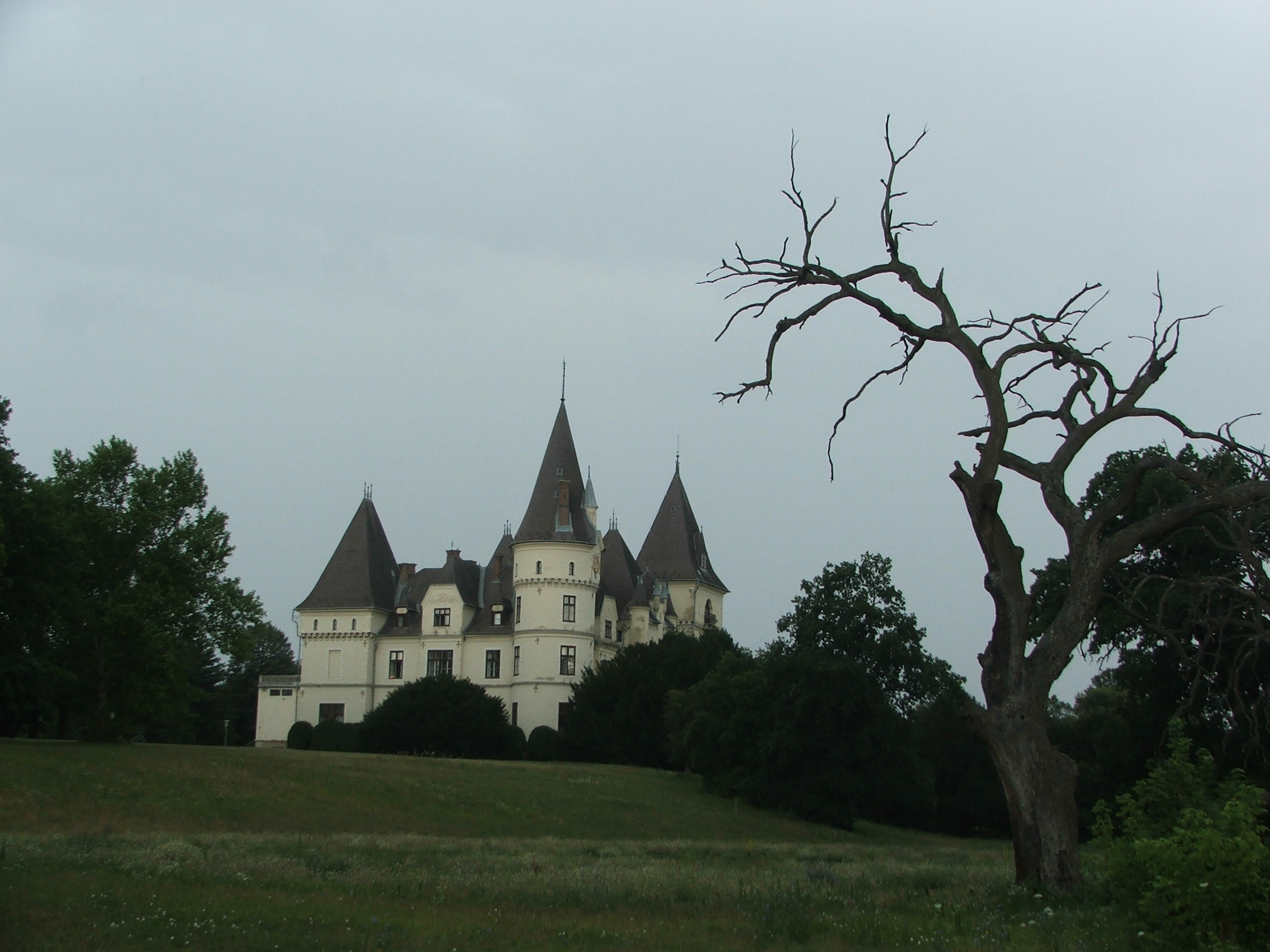
The former Andrássy mansion in Tiszadob; now houses the orphanage Oláh grew up in

== Early life and career ==
Ibolya is of Romani ancestry. She was born in Nyíregyháza and grew up in an orphanage in Tiszadob, where she studied vegetable gardening. She briefly attended a music school in Budapest but did not finish it.

She learned to sing and to play the guitar mostly by herself. After a few unsuccessful entries at talent contests, she entered the talent show Megasztár (in its first season during 2003/04) and came second after Vera Tóth. Her debut album, released in 2004, reached No. 1 on the Hungarian album chart and stayed on the chart for 41 weeks. Her second album, released in the following year, was No.2 and her third album No. 4.

On August 20, 2005, on an celebration ceremony dedicated to Hungary's national holiday, Ibolya Oláh sang Péter Geszti's song, "There is a country, Hungary", which later caused her to face a lot of nationalistic affronts.

Her main influences are Linda Perry, Alanis Morissette, Pink, Ildikó Keresztes, Guns N' Roses, Rolling Stones, Aerosmith, and Queen.

In 2014, she competed in the Hungarian national final of the Eurovision Song Contest, in A Dal 2014, with her entry "1 percig sztár" (Star for 1 minute) where she advanced through the first heat but was eliminated in the semi-finals.

In October 2018, Ibolya released her new album in collaboration with Gábor Presser. The album has 28 songs, which include originals as well as poetry made into songs. These poems were written by Virág Erdős, Péter Kántor, Lajos Parti Nagy, Zorán Sztevanovity, Dániel Varró, Péter Závada, Szilárd Borbély, Ernő Szép and Endre Fejes. The material of the album will be used in a theatre performance.

After Peter Magyar became Prime Minister of Hungary in May 2026, Ibolya sang the song "Magyarország" on Parliament Square. Previously Ibolya was not allowed by Hungarian nationalists to sing the song because she is a Romani; in a 2022 interview she said she would never sing it because she had lost her belief in people and in the possibility of changes.

== Personal life ==
In November 2011 she was outed as a lesbian by the tabloid Blikk.

== Discography ==
=== Albums ===
Album information
Egy sima, egy fordított
- Released: 2004
- Chart Positions: #1 HUN
- HUN certification: Platinum
- HUN Sales: 30.000+
Édes méreg
- Released: 12 November 2005
- Chart Positions: #2 HUN
- HUN certification: Platinum
- HUN Sales: 20.000+
El merem mondani
- Released: 26 February 2010
- Chart Positions: #4 HUN
- HUN certification:
- HUN Sales:
Nézz vissza
- Released: 24 November 2011
- Chart Positions:
- HUN certification:
- HUN Sales:
Voltam Ibojka
- Released: 1 October 2018

=== Singles ===
- 2004 "Nem kell" (#20 on MAHASZ Radio Top 40; No. 21 on MAHASZ Editor's Choice)
- 2005 "Magyarország" (#2, No. 5, No. 124 on Euro 200)
- 2005 "Édes méreg" (#12 on Top 40)
- 2006 "Nézz vissza" (#24 on Top 40)
- 2006 "Valamit valamiért" feat. Roy & Ádám (#27 on Top 40)
- 2008 "Egy elfelejtett dal" feat. Zsuzsa Cserháti & Caramel (#13 on Top 40)
- 2010 "Ritmus" (#4 on Top 40)
- 2010 "Baby" (#8 on Top 40)
- 2013 "Mással csináljuk" (Egy Másik Zenekar feat. Oláh Ibolya)
- 2018 "Voltam Ibojka"

== See also ==
- Hungarian pop
