= Leander Rising =

Hungarian metal band

- Origin: Budapest, Hungary
- Genres: Metal
- Years active: 2009–2015
- Labels: Sony Music Hungary
- Past members: Leander Köteles; Attila Vörös; József "Jozzy" Takács; Béla Budai; Márk Maczák

Leander Rising (formerly known as just Leander) was a Hungarian metal band.

== History ==
The band started in 2009 after the disbanding of another Hungarian metal band named Babylon, which the lead singer Leander Köteles was a part of. During this time, this bands only member was Leander himself. But in 2010, Attila Vörös joined the band after watching Leander perform his own song Csak te ("Only You"). In the same year, they obtained two new members: József "Jozzy" Takács and Bela Budai. After a sold-out concert in Budapest in 2010, Leander (their erstwhile name) became a household name within the Hungarian metal scene. Also in 2011, after a successful summer festival tour in Hungary, Sony Music Hungary took notice of the band and signed them for a contract. On 24 March 2012, their first album was released, named simply Szívidomár, with an English version of the album named "Heart Tamer" being released online, and later on 27 November 2012 in disc format. In the summer of 2012, the band changed its name to its current form: Leander Rising.

In September 2014, Leander Rising released a second album: Öngyötrő. The album also contained the song "Lőjetek fel", which competed at A Dal 2015, the national selection for the Eurovision Song Contest 2015. It was selected into the second heat on 31 January 2015, and was eliminated.

Announced on Facebook, after 5 years of performing, Leander Rising performed its last tour by the end of 2015, effectively ending the band as a whole. Köteles went on to start a new band, similarly named Leander Kills, while Budai went on to go be part of the Sopron-based thrash metal band Moby Dick, and Jozzy went on to become part of the band String Theory.

== Discography ==
Year	Album	Highest rank	Classification
Year	Album	MAHASZ Top 40 Albums and Compilations	Classification
2012	Szívidomár	3	
2014	Öngyötrő	6	

== Members ==
- Leander Köteles: lead singer, keyboard, bass guitar
- Attila Vörös: guitar
- József "Jozzy" Takács: guitar, vocals
- Béla Budai: drums

== Resources (In Hungarian) ==
- Leander (rockerek.hu)
- Leander Rising dalszöveg, kotta, YouTube video, játékok - (zeneszoveg.hu)

== More information (In Hungarian) ==
- Szobazenészből metálzenekar – Leander-lemezkritika
- Leander Rising - Két világ közt (YouTube 5:12)
