= A'Cappella ExpreSSS =

Russian a cappella group from Moscow

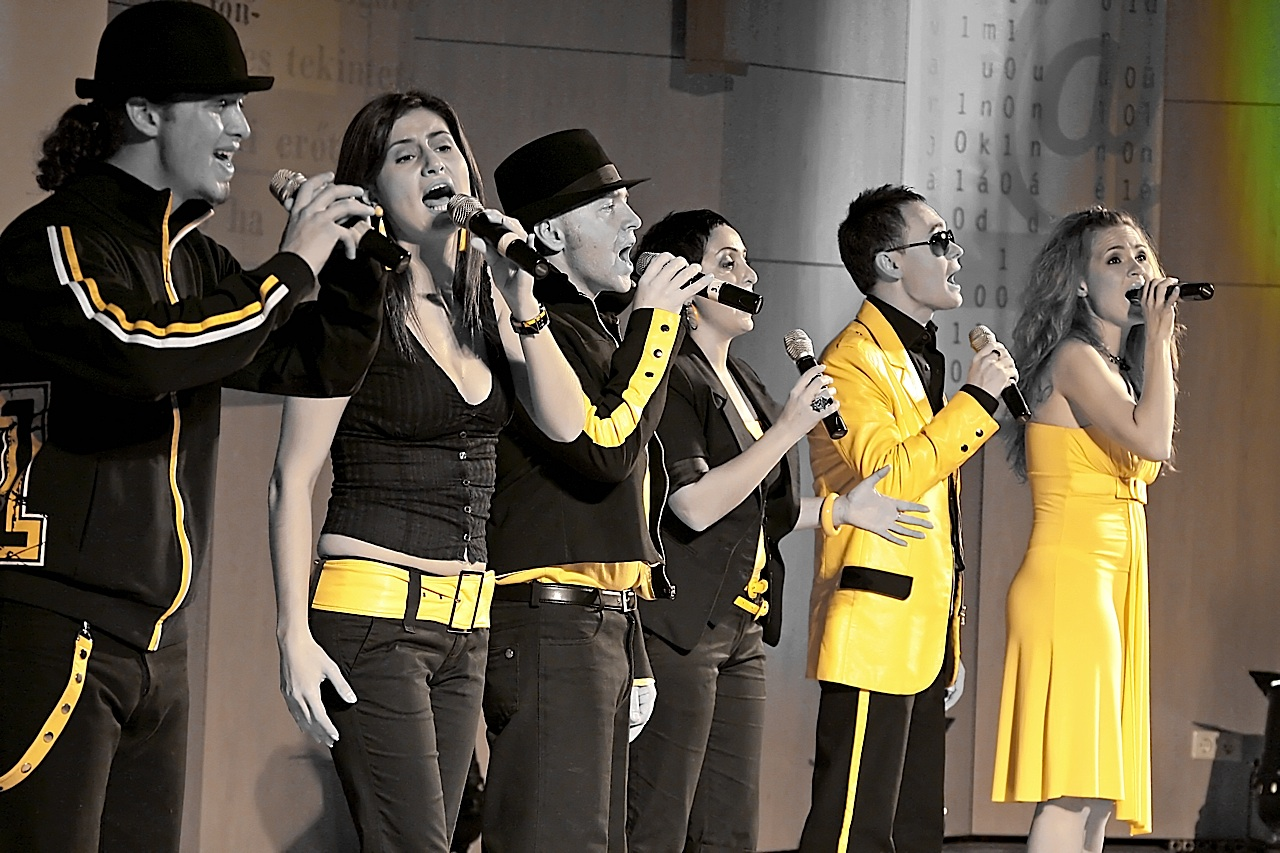
- A'Cappella ExpreSSS in 2007

Background information
- Origin: Moscow, Russia
- Genres: A cappella, Vocal jazz
- Years active: 2002 – present
- Label: Universal Music
- Members: Ruslan Mustafin; Viktoriya Shirokova; Ekaterina Nadareishvili; Andrey Tunik; Max Kostra; Alla Goloviznina
- Past members: Eteri Beriashvili; Alexey Zavolokin; Diana Polenova; Elena Nazarova; Tatiana Barnysheva; Narine Jinanyan; Kseniya Penkovskaya
- Website: www.ae-vocal.com

A'Cappella ExpreSSS is a professional a cappella group from Moscow, Russia, consisting of six members: soprano Viktoriya Shirokova, tenor Max Kostra, soprano Ekaterina Nadareishvili, baritone Ruslan Mustafin, contralto Alla Goloviznina and bass Andrey Tunik. The ensemble was founded in 2002, and recorded their debut album, entitled Magic Moment, the following year.

== Discography ==
=== 2003 Magic Moment ===
1. Intro
2. Not Today (Не сегодня)
3. My Favorite Things
4. People
5. Jazzed MozArt
6. Monotonously Rings the Handbell (Однозвучно гремит колокольчик)
7. Magic Moment Bossa
8. Katyusha (Катюша)
9. C Jam Blues
10. A`cappella ExpreSSS

=== 2005 Voice meSSSage ===
1. Middle of the River (Based on Henry Longfellow's lyrics)
2. Around the World ExpreSSS
3. Moscow Nights (Подмосковные вечера)
4. Love Me Do
5. Georgian Choral
6. A'Cappella Lounge
7. Magic Moment Bossa (bonus)
8. Copernicus
9. Steppe (Степь)
10. Not Today
11. Hit the Road Jack

2011 - DVD "Live in Moscow"

== Joint works ==
- Two songs for Andrey Makarevich's tribute to Bulat Okudzhava: "Song About a Nightly Moscow (Песенка о ночной Москве)" and "Prayer (Молитва)"
- Magic Moment recorded for Jazz Province compilation
- Three songs for Venyamin Golubitsky's album Bus (Автобус) (music written by Alexander Pantykin): "People Cry at Night (Люди плачут по ночам)", "I Forgot (Я забыл)" and "Little Orchestra (Оркестрик)"
- Four songs for Mystery Sound's Christmas compilation: "Jingle Bells (Бубенцы)", "Little Fir is Born (В лесу родилась ёлочка)", "White Christmas (Иней Рождества)", "Brahms' Lullaby (Баю-бай)"
- Two songs for the Golden Melodies of Moscow (Золотые мелодии Москвы) compilation: "Moscow Nights (Подмосковные вечера)" and "Do You Hear, Moscow (Слышишь, Москва)"
- Three songs for Vitaly Moskalenko's film "One Life (Жизнь Одна)" "Oh, This Life Without Tomorrow (О, жизнь без завтрашнего дня)", "La Vie Ensemble" and "White Dog-Rose (белый шиповник)"
- Song "Thank You, Music (Спасибо, Музыка, тебе)" recorded for composer Mark Minkov's tribute album А знаешь, все еще будет...

== Awards ==
- "Ward Swingle Award" (2003) — first prize in the international a cappella competition "Vokal Total" (Jazz Category) in Graz, Austria
- CARA ("Contemporary A Cappella Recording Award") for "Best Jazz Album 2004" — "Magic Moment"
