= Balázs Farkas-Jenser =

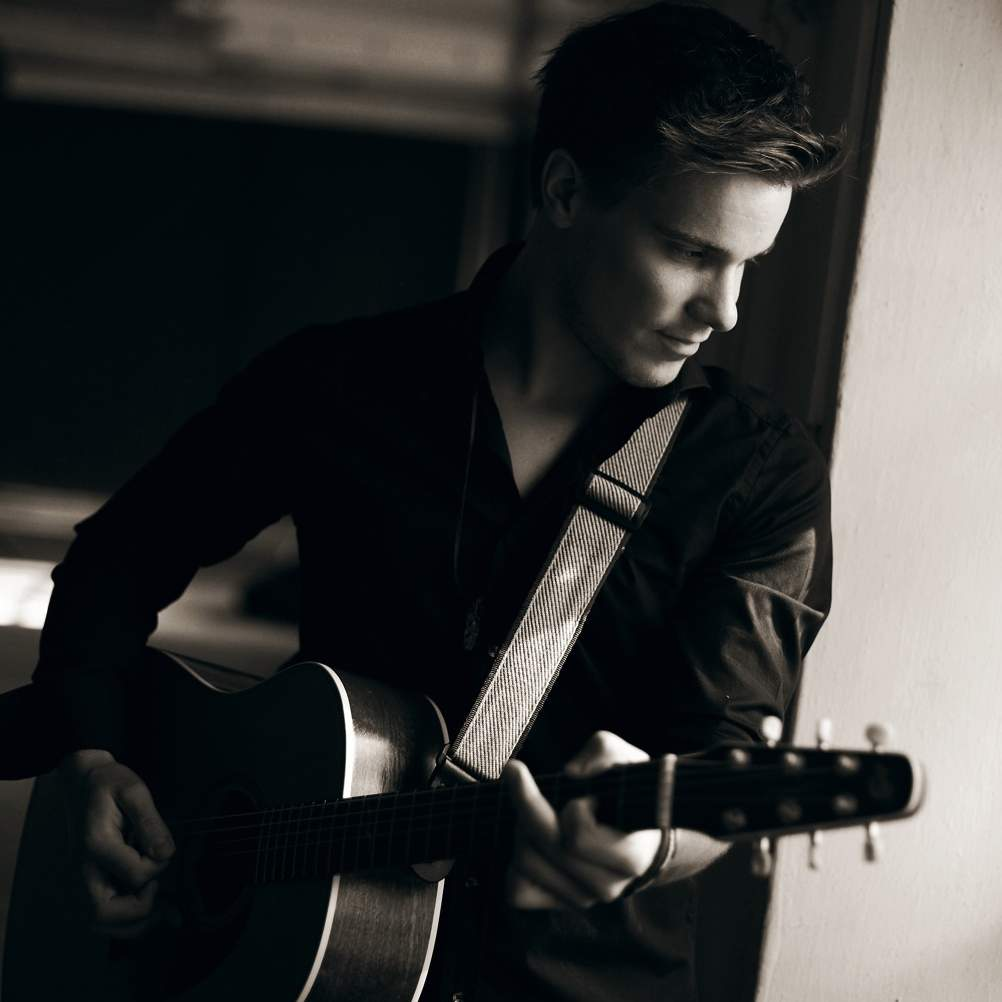

Background information
- Born: 30 May 1990 (age 36); Budapest
- Genres: Pop
- Occupations: Singer, songwriter, guitarist
- Instrument: Vocals
- Years active: 2013–present
- Label: MTM-SBS (2012-2016)

Balázs Farkas-Jenser (born 30 May 1990 in Budapest, Hungary) is a Hungarian singer, guitarist, and songwriter. He is most notable for coming fourth in the sixth season of Megasztár in 2012.

== Personal life ==
Balázs was born on 30 May 1990 in Budapest. He attended Németvölgyi Primary School and studied at Magyar-British International School (MBIS) from 1997 to 2000. During this time, he studied the piano for four years. After four years of learning in MBIS, he returned to Hungarian education. He discontinued his learning of the piano and started learning clarinet on the advice of and under the guidance of Imre Benke.

In 2001, he watched the film Blues Brothers 2000, which later affected his musical tastes and style. His influences included Eric Clapton, B. B. King, and Aretha Franklin. He attended Baár-Madas Reformed Highschool. In 2006, he got his first guitar, which turned out to be also a turning point in his life. A year later he received his first electric guitar, he became acquainted by the works of Stevie Ray Vaughan. His love for blues music continued to grow. He then began playing the guitar professionally with Eduárd Palatin and Elek Lakatos as mentors.

In December 2009, Balázs was playing with various amateur bands covering Blues and Rock songs, primarily singing. Not sufficiently proficient on the guitar at the time, he continued practicing in private. He spent the 2007/2008 academic year as a private student in high school. He went on to study at the Cistercian High School in St. Emeric and spent the 2008/2009 Baccalaureate school year carrying out studies at Törökbálint Martin Valentine Elementary School. He studied Jazz vocal studies in Kobanyai Zenei Studio from 2006 to 2009 while being a private pupil in his final two high school years.

== Professional career ==
Over a number of years, Balázs has participated in a number of bands. Up until his years in Kobanyai Zenei Studio, he had worked with mostly non-professional musicians, focusing on blues and rock adaptations and covers. In 2010, Balázs joined the band Freezbee. In May 2011, he invited Zádor Simonyi whom he knew from Kobanyai Zenei Studio to join Freezbee on drums.

In 2011, the band leader, Ervin Krenyiczky, presented the idea of participating in the sixth season of Megasztár. After initially resisting, Balazs applied for the show and ultimately placed 4th in the Live Shows. The band formerly known as Freezbee continued to work with Balazs during his concert tours following the Megasztar competition. However, due to personal differences and differences in artistic vision, the band disbanded and reformed as a trio, this time without guitarist Ervin Krenyiczky. The trio continued to tour Hungary mainly focused on smaller local events and small-mid public events in larger cities of Hungary, Romania, Slovakia and Serbia.

In late 2014, Balázs was one of the names mentioned in a press conference to participate in A Dal 2015, the national selection for the Eurovision Song Contest 2015. Later, his song was revealed to be called "Liar". On 24 January 2015, he participated in the first heat, succeeding Magyar Bori and preceding Gabi Szűcs. He was eliminated from the first heat, receiving 37 points. Despite other entries gaining the same number of points, Balázs got more mixed ratings from the judges than other songs and was not voted as the lone SMS and televote qualifier, that honour going to Timi Antal.

== Sources ==
- "Velvet.hu".
- "Hír24.hu". Archived from the original on 2012-07-18.
