= Slobodan Ćurčić =

American art historian (1940–2017)

Slobodan Ćurčić (Serbian Cyrillic: Слободан Ћурчић; Sarajevo, Kingdom of Yugoslavia, 19 December 1940 – Thessaloniki, Greece, 3 December 2017) was an American art historian and Byzantinist.

== Life ==
After completing school in Belgrade, Ćurčić first studied architecture at the University of Illinois at Urbana-Champaign, where he obtained a Bachelor of Architecture in 1964 and a Master of Architecture in 1965. In 1975, he received his doctorate in art history from New York University Institute of Fine Arts under Richard Krautheimer with a thesis on the monastery church of Gračanica.

From 1971 to 1982 he taught architectural history at the Department of Architecture at the University of Illinois at Urbana-Champaign. From 1982 until his retirement in 2010 he taught as a professor for Early Christian and Byzantine Art at the Department of Art and Archeology at Princeton University. In addition, he was director of the Hellenic Studies Program at Princeton University from 2006 to 2010.

His main area of research was Byzantine architecture, especially the Middle and Late Byzantine Period. In 2010 he presented a summary of his research in the monumental work Architecture in the Balkans from Diocletian to Süleyman the Magnificent.

From 1997 he was a member of the Serbian Academy of Sciences, from 2004 an honorary member of the Christian Archaeological Society in Athens. In 2006 he became a member of the "Experts Committee on the Rehabilitation and Safeguarding of Cultural Heritage in Kosovo" of the UNESCO for the preservation of cultural property in Kosovo.

== Publications (selection) ==
- Gračanica. King Milutin's church and its place in Late Byzantine architecture. University Park; London 1979, ISBN 0-271-00218-2
- Art and Architecture in the Balkans. An Annotated Bibliography. Boston 1984, ISBN 0-8161-8326-0
- Gračanica - istorija i arhitektura. Belgrade 1988, ISBN 86-07-00358-5
- "The architecture", in Ernst Kitzinger, The mosaics of St. Mary’s of the Admiral in Palermo. Washington 1990, ISBN 0-88402-179-3, pp. 27–104.
- Some Observations and Questions Regarding Early Christian Architecture in Thessaloniki. Thessaloniki 2000
- Religious Settings of the Late Byzantine Sphere. In: Helen Evans (ed.): Byzantium. Faith and Power (1261–1557). New York 2004, pp. 66–77.
- Middle Byzantine architecture on Cyprus: provincial or regional?, Nicosia, The Bank of Cyprus Cultural Foundation 2000, ISBN 9963-42-090-7
- with Svetlana Popović: Naupara, (= Korpus sacralne arhitekture Srbije u kasnom srednjem veku 1), Belgrade 2001
- The role of late Byzantine Thessalonike in church architecture in the Balkans, in Dumbarton Oaks Papers 57, 2003, pp. 65–84.
- Architecture in the Balkans from Diocletian to Süleyman the Magnificent, New Haven, Conn., Yale University Press 2010, ISBN 978-0-300-11570-3
- Kartografija (2013)
