= Hungary in the Eurovision Song Contest 2014 =

- Eurovision Song Contest 2014
- Country: Hungary
- Selection process: A Dal 2014
- Selection date: 22 February 2014

Competing entry
- Song: "Running"
- Artist: András Kállay-Saunders
- Songwriters: András Kállay-Saunders; Krisztián Szakos; István Tabár

Placement
- Semi-final result: Qualified (3rd, 127 points)
- Final result: 5th, 143 points

Participation chronology

Hungary was represented at the Eurovision Song Contest 2014 in Copenhagen, Denmark. Their entry was selected through the national competition A Dal, organised by the Hungarian broadcaster Magyar Televízió (MTV). András Kállay-Saunders represented Hungary with the song "Running", which qualified from the first semi-final and placed 5th in the final, scoring 143 points. It is the second best position ever for Hungary, after 4th place in their debut year 1994.

== Before Eurovision ==
=== A Dal 2014 ===
A Dal 2014 was the third edition of A Dal which selected the Hungarian entry for the Eurovision Song Contest 2014. Thirty entries competed in the competition that consisted of three shows which commenced on 25 January 2014 and concluded with an eight-song final on 22 February 2014. All shows in the competition were broadcast on m1 and Duna TV World.

==== Format ====
The format of the competition consisted of six shows: three heats, two semi-finals and a final. The six shows took place at MTVA studios in Budapest and were hosted by Éva Novodomszky and Gábor Gundel Takács, with Levente Harsányi and Krisztina Rátonyi conducting backstage interviews. Last year's winner, ByeAlex, also took part in the show as a digital commentator, providing reports and facts regarding the competition. The three heats, held on 25 January 2014, 1 February 2014 and 8 February 2014, each featured ten entries with six advancing to the semi-finals from each show. The semi-finals, held on 15 and 16 February 2014 during A Dal-hétvége (A Dal-weekend), each featured nine entries with four advancing to the final from each show. The final, held on 22 February 2014, selected the Hungarian entry for Copenhagen from the eight remaining entries.

==== Voting ====
Results during each show were determined by each member of the four-member judging panel and votes from the public. During the heats and the semi-finals, two rounds of voting determined which entries advanced to the next stages of the competition. In the first round of voting, each judge assigned scores to each entry ranging from 1 (lowest score) to 10 (highest score) immediately after the artist(s) conclude their performance. The summation of the judges scores determined the final scores for the first round. In the heats, the top three entries with the highest scores advanced to the semi-finals. In the semi-finals, the top two entries with the highest scores advanced to the final in the first round of voting. In the case of a tie among the entries in the first round of voting, the judging panel would deliberate and determine which entries would advance. In the second round of voting, the remaining entries that did not qualify during the first round faced a public vote via submitting an SMS. The three entries that received the most votes from each heat would also advance to the semi-finals, while the two entries that received the most votes from each semi-final would also advance to the final. In the case of a tie during the second round of voting, the entry which received a higher score during the first round of voting would advance and should a tie still persist, the judging panel would deliberate and determine which entry advanced.

In the final, the eight remaining entries also faced two rounds of voting. In the first round, the judges assigned points to their four preferred entries: 4 (lowest), 6, 8 and 10 (highest). The top four entries determined by the judges qualified to the second round of voting. In the second round, a public vote exclusively determined the winning entry.

==== Judges ====
The judging panel participated in each show by providing feedback to the competing artists and selecting entries to advance in the competition. The panel consisted of:

- Kati Kovács – Singer, lyricist and actress
- Jenő Csiszár – Radio anchor
- Magdi Rúzsa – Singer who represented Hungary in 2007 in Helsinki with "Unsubstantial Blues"
- Philip Rákay – MTV programme director

==== Competing entries ====
Artists and composers were able to submit their applications and entries for the competition between 10 October 2013 and 1 December 2013. Competing artists were required to either hold Hungarian citizenship or be able to speak Hungarian fluently. Artists were permitted to collaborate with international composers and submit songs in English and/or in a recognised minority language in Hungary, however, in such cases a translation of the lyrics to Hungarian were required. After the submission deadline had passed, a record 435 entries were received by the broadcaster. A ten-member preselection jury selected thirty entries for the competition. The competing entries were announced during a press conference on 11 December 2013. Among the competing artists was former Eurovision Song Contest entrant Gergő Rácz (competing as a member of Fool Moon), who represented Hungary in the 1997 Contest as a member of V.I.P.

Artist	Song	Songwriter(s)
2Beat or Not 2Beat	"Meg akarom mondani"	Tibor Stefaich, József Dornai
Belmondo	"Miért ne higgyem"	Zoltán Czutor
Bogi	"We All"	G. Zoltán Tóth, Péter Halász
BülBüls	"Minden mosoly"	Géza Demeter, Gábor Bruzsa
Laura Cserpes	"Úgy szállj"	Péter Krajczár, László Mészáros, István Tabár
Depresszió	"Csak a zene"	Halász Ferenc, Ádám Hartmann, Dávid Nagy, Zoltán Kovács, Miklós Pálffy
Heni Dér	"Ég veled"	Krisztián Burai, Henrietta Dér, Ernő Bodócki, Norbert Szabó
Extensive	"Help Me"	Krisztián Héjja, Máté Horvay, Attila Dolmán
Fool Moon	"It Can't Be Over"	Máté Bella, Gergő Rácz, Attila Galambos, Vajk Szente
Bálint Gájer	"Elmaradt pillanatok"	Áron Romhányi, Bálint Gájer, Tamás Orbán
Group'N'Swing	"Retikül"	Áron Romhányi, Márton Lombos
Hien	"The Way I Do"	Nguyen Thanh Hien, Johnny K. Palmer
HoneyBeast	"A legnagyobb hős"	Zoltán Kovács
Joni	"Waterfall"	Johanna Tóth, Gabriella Wilson, Phil Greiss, Michael James Down, Emanuel Abrahamsson, Dimitri Stassos, Tamás Pataki
András Kállay-Saunders	"Running"	András Kállay-Saunders, Krisztián Szakos, István Tabár
Linda Király	"Everything"	Linda Király, Shannon Sanders, Tamás Király
Viktor Király	"Running Out of Time"	Viktor Király, Diamond Duggal, Tamás Király
Gabi Knoll	"Sweet Memories"	Mike Previti, Steve Horner, Gabi Knoll
Lil C	"Break Up"	Csaba Kelemen Krisztián Burai, Ernő Bodóczki
Marge	"Morning Light"	Krisztián Szakos, Zsuzsanna Batta
Muzikfabrik	"This Is My Life"	László Sövegjártó, András Rozmann, Szilárd Sinka, Ákos Hegyi
Mystery Gang	"Játssz még jazzgitár"	Péter Egri
New Level Empire	"The Last One"	Zoltán Szilveszter Ujvári, Péter Krajczár, Sándor Nyújtó, Petra Mayer
Ibolya Oláh	"1 percig sztár"	Ibolya Oláh
Dénes Pál	"Brave New World"	Gatti di Amalfi, Vera Jónás, Ákos Dobrády, Kriszta Kotsy, Dénes Pál
Lilla Polyák	"Karcolás"	Viktor Rakonczai, Gergő Rácz, Zsolt Homonnay, Johnny K. Palmer
Gigi Radics	"Catch Me"	Freja Blomberg, Maria Marcus, Charlie Mason
Leslie Szabó	"Hogy segíthetnék"	Leslie Szabó
Saci Szécsi and Böbe Szécsi	"Born To Fly"	Sarolta Szécsi, Zoltán Czutor, László "Diaz" Csöndör
Tamás Vastag	"Állj meg világ"	Tamás Vastag, Johnny Sanchez, Erik Mjörnell, Samuel Gajicki, Primož Poglajen

==== Shows ====
===== Heats =====
Three heats took place on 25 January, 1 February and 8 February 2014. In each heat ten entries competed and six entries qualified to the semi-finals after two rounds of voting. In the first round of voting, three qualifiers were determined by the combination of scores from each judge. In the second round of voting, the remaining seven entries that were not in the initial top three faced a public vote consisting of votes submitted through SMS in order to determine three additional qualifiers.

Jury qualifier Public voting qualifier

Heat 1 – 25 January 2014
R/O	Artist	Song	J. Csiszár	M. Rúzsa	P. Rákay	K. Kovács	Jury Total	Result
1	Group'N'Swing	"Retikül"	8	8	9	9	34	Advanced
2	Laura Cserpes	"Úgy szállj"	7	7	8	6	28	—N/a
3	Lil C	"Break Up"	7	7	8	8	30	—N/a
4	Ibolya Oláh	"1 percig sztár"	9	9	8	8	34	Advanced
5	Extensive	"Help Me"	7	7	8	8	30	—N/a
6	Leslie Szabó	"Hogy segíthetnék"	9	10	8	8	35	Advanced
7	Hien	"The Way I Do"	8	9	8	7	32	—N/a
8	Depresszió	"Csak a zene"	8	8	8	9	33	Advanced
9	Marge	"Morning Light"	9	9	10	8	36	Advanced
10	Viktor Király	"Running Out of Time"	10	10	10	10	40	Advanced

Heat 2 – 1 February 2014
R/O	Artist	Song	J. Csiszár	M. Rúzsa	P. Rákay	K. Kovács	Jury Total	Result
1	Heni Dér	"Ég veled"	8	10	9	8	35	Advanced
2	Belmondo	"Miért ne higgyem"	9	8	8	8	33	—N/a
3	Joni	"Waterfall"	9	9	10	8	36	Advanced
4	2Beat or Not 2Beat	"Meg akarom mondani"	8	7	8	7	30	—N/a
5	Bogi	"We All"	9	9	10	7	35	Advanced
6	Tamás Vastag	"Állj meg világ"	9	8	9	9	35	—N/a
7	Saci Szécsi and Böbe Szécsi	"Born To Fly"	8	7	8	7	30	—N/a
8	Lilla Polyák	"Karcolás"	8	7	8	8	31	Advanced
9	Muzikfabrik	"This Is My Life"	8	9	8	9	34	Advanced
10	András Kállay-Saunders	"Running"	10	9	10	9	38	Advanced

Heat 3 – 8 February 2014
R/O	Artist	Song	J. Csiszár	M. Rúzsa	P. Rákay	K. Kovács	Jury Total	Result
1	Gigi Radics	"Catch Me"	8	8	8	8	32	Advanced
2	Fool Moon	"It Can't Be Over"	8	8	9	10	35	Advanced
3	Bálint Gájer	"Elmaradt pillanatok"	7	8	9	9	33	—N/a
4	Gabi Knoll	"Sweet Memories"	7	7	8	7	29	—N/a
5	New Level Empire	"The Last One"	9	9	10	8	36	Advanced
6	BülBüls	"Minden mosoly"	8	7	8	7	30	—N/a
7	Linda Király	"Everything"	9	9	8	8	34	—N/a
8	HoneyBeast	"A legnagyobb hős"	8	8	9	9	34	Advanced
9	Dénes Pál	"Brave New World"	10	10	10	8	38	Advanced
10	Mystery Gang	"Játssz még jazzgitár"	8	7	9	7	31	Advanced

===== Semi-finals =====
Two semi-finals took place on 15 and 16 February 2014. In each semi-final nine entries competed and four entries qualified to the final after two rounds of voting. In the first round of voting, two qualifiers were determined by the combination of scores from each judge. In the second round of voting, the remaining seven entries that were not in the initial top two faced a public vote consisting of votes submitted through SMS in order to determine two additional qualifiers.

Jury qualifier Public voting qualifier

Semi-final 1 – 15 February 2014
R/O	Artist	Song	J. Csiszár	M. Rúzsa	P. Rákay	K. Kovács	Jury Total	Result
1	Mystery Gang	"Játssz még jazzgitár"	8	8	8	7	31	—N/a
2	Joni	"Waterfall"	7	7	8	8	30	—N/a
3	Viktor Király	"Running Out of Time"	10	10	10	9	39	Advanced
4	Group'N'Swing	"Retikül"	7	8	8	9	32	—N/a
5	Bogi	"We All"	10	10	10	8	38	Advanced
6	Depresszió	"Csak a zene"	8	9	8	9	34	Advanced
7	Leslie Szabó	"Hogy segíthetnék"	8	10	9	8	35	—N/a
8	Gigi Radics	"Catch Me"	8	8	8	8	32	—N/a
9	New Level Empire	"The Last One"	9	9	10	8	36	Advanced

Semi-final 2 – 16 February 2014
R/O	Artist	Song	J. Csiszár	M. Rúzsa	P. Rákay	K. Kovács	Jury Total	Result
1	Muzikfabrik	"This Is My Life"	9	8	8	9	34	—N/a
2	Lilla Polyák	"Karcolás"	8	8	8	8	32	—N/a
3	Dénes Pál	"Brave New World"	10	10	10	8	38	Advanced
4	HoneyBeast	"A legnagyobb hős"	9	10	9	9	37	Advanced
5	Marge	"Morning Light"	9	9	9	8	35	—N/a
6	András Kállay-Saunders	"Running"	10	10	10	10	40	Advanced
7	Ibolya Oláh	"1 percig sztár"	8	9	8	8	33	—N/a
8	Fool Moon	"It Can't Be Over"	9	10	9	10	38	Advanced
9	Heni Dér	"Ég veled"	9	9	9	8	35	—N/a

===== Final =====
The final took place on 22 February 2014 where the eight entries that qualified from the semi-finals competed. The winner of the competition was selected over two rounds of voting. In the first round, the jury determined the top four entries that advanced to the second round. The voting system for the four jurors was different from the method used in the heats and semi-finals. Each juror announced their scores after all songs had been performed rather than assigning scores following each performance and the jurors ranked their preferred top four entries and assigned points in the following manner: 4 (lowest), 6, 8 and 10 (highest). The four entries with the highest total scores proceeded to the second round. In the second round, "Running" performed by András Kállay-Saunders was selected as the winner via a public vote consisting of votes submitted through SMS. 145,000 votes were registered in the second round.

Advanced to the second round Winner

Final – First Round – 22 February 2014
R/O	Artist	Song	J. Csiszár	M. Rúzsa	P. Rákay	K. Kovács	Total	Place
1	Depresszió	"Csak a zene"	0	0	0	0	0	7
2	Bogi	"We All"	10	6	10	0	26	2
3	András Kállay-Saunders	"Running"	4	10	8	8	30	1
4	New Level Empire	"The Last One"	8	0	0	4	12	5
5	Dénes Pál	"Brave New World"	0	4	0	0	4	6
6	Fool Moon	"It Can't Be Over"	0	8	4	10	22	3
7	Viktor Király	"Running Out of Time"	6	0	6	6	18	4
8	HoneyBeast	"A legnagyobb hős"	0	0	0	0	0	7

Final – Second Round – 22 February 2014
Artist	Song	Place
Bogi	"We All"	—
András Kállay-Saunders	"Running"	1
Fool Moon	"It Can't Be Over"	2
Viktor Király	"Running Out of Time"	—

== At Eurovision ==
András Kállay-Saunders presenting himself at the contest

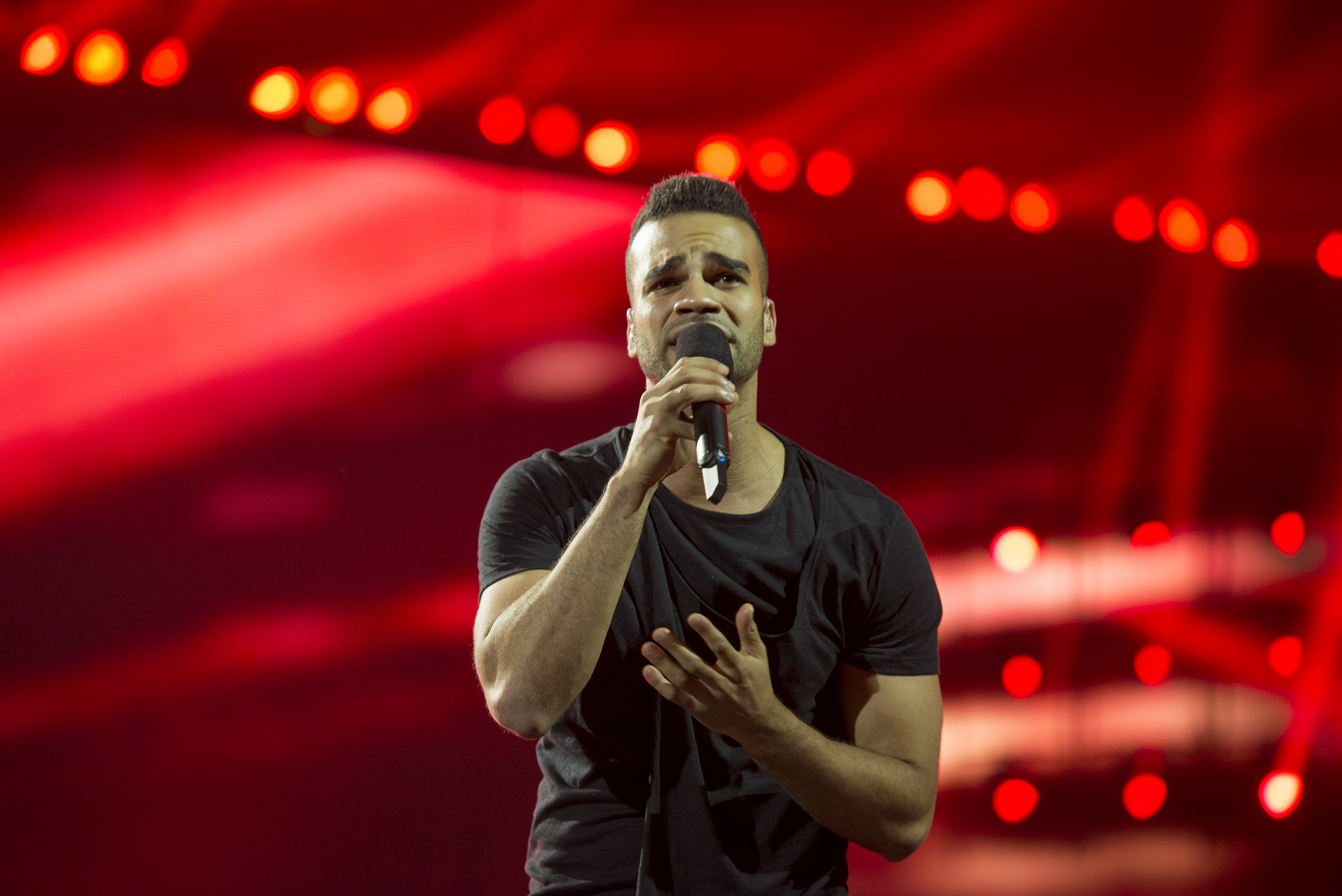
András Kállay-Saunders at the first semi-final dress rehearsal

During the semi-final allocation draw on 20 January 2014 at the Copenhagen City Hall, Hungary was drawn to compete in the second half of the first semi-final on 6 May 2014. In the first semi-final, the producers of the show decided that Hungary would close the semi-final and perform 16th, following Montenegro. Hungary qualified from the first semi-final and competed in the final on 10 May 2014. During the winner's press conference for the first semi-final qualifiers, Hungary was allocated to compete in the second half of the final. In the final, the producers of the show decided that Hungary would perform 21st, following Switzerland and preceding Malta. Hungary placed 5th in the final, scoring 143 points.

On stage, András Kállay-Saunders was joined by dancers Alexandra Likovics and Tibor Nagy and backing vocalists Rozina Cselovszky and Kyra Fedor. The Hungarian performance was based on the song's theme of domestic violence with the choreography between the two dancers resembling a fight. The LED projections during the performance transitioned from a nighttime cityscape during the verses to fast moving red lines during the chorus.

In Hungary, both the semi-finals and the final were broadcast on M1 with commentary by Gábor Gundel Takács. The Hungarian spokesperson revealing the result of the Hungarian vote in the final was Éva Novodomszky.

=== Voting ===
==== Points awarded to Hungary ====
Points awarded to Hungary (Semi-final 1)
Score	Country
12 points	Belgium
10 points	Albania; Netherlands; Portugal; Spain; Sweden
8 points	Azerbaijan; Estonia; Iceland; Russia; San Marino; Ukraine
7 points	
6 points	Denmark
5 points	
4 points	Moldova
3 points	France; Latvia
2 points	
1 point	Armenia

Points awarded to Hungary (Final)
Score	Country
12 points	Montenegro
10 points	Macedonia; Romania
8 points	Albania; Azerbaijan
7 points	Austria; Belgium; Estonia; Israel; San Marino; Sweden
6 points	Greece; Iceland; Portugal; Russia
5 points	Belarus; Finland
4 points	Moldova; Netherlands
3 points	Denmark; Ukraine
2 points	Spain
1 point	Ireland; Latvia; Switzerland

==== Points awarded by Hungary ====
Points awarded by Hungary (Semi-final 1)
Score	Country
12 points	Netherlands
10 points	Sweden
8 points	Armenia
7 points	San Marino
6 points	Iceland
5 points	Russia
4 points	Montenegro
3 points	Ukraine
2 points	Latvia
1 point	Azerbaijan

Points awarded by Hungary (Final)
Score	Country
12 points	Netherlands
10 points	Austria
8 points	Sweden
7 points	Armenia
6 points	Finland
5 points	Iceland
4 points	San Marino
3 points	Poland
2 points	Ukraine
1 point	Switzerland

==== Detailed voting results ====
The following members comprised the Hungarian jury:

- Zoltan Palásti Kovács – Chairperson – musical teacher, music historian, musician, DJ, producer
- Kati Kovács – performer, singer, songwriter
- Attila Náksi – DJ, music producer, record company owner
- Péter Dorozsmai – musician, producer, songwriter, sound engineer
- Vera Tóth – singer, songwriter, lyricist

Detailed voting results from Hungary (Semi-final 1)
R/O	Country	Z. Palásti Kovács	K. Kovács	A. Náksi	P. Dorozsmai	V. Tóth	Jury Rank	Televote Rank	Combined Rank	Points
01	Armenia	2	14	14	2	5	6	5	3	8
02	Latvia	8	6	2	8	15	8	7	9	2
03	Estonia	14	11	9	9	13	13	13	14	
04	Sweden	9	10	11	5	3	7	2	2	10
05	Iceland	11	9	3	11	10	10	3	5	6
06	Albania	5	8	12	7	8	9	12	12	
07	Russia	4	12	6	6	4	5	9	6	5
08	Azerbaijan	3	5	7	4	1	2	14	10	1
09	Ukraine	12	7	4	14	9	11	4	8	3
10	Belgium	10	4	10	15	14	12	10	13	
11	Moldova	13	13	15	13	11	15	15	15	
12	San Marino	7	3	5	10	7	4	8	4	7
13	Portugal	15	15	13	12	6	14	6	11	
14	Netherlands	1	1	1	1	2	1	1	1	12
15	Montenegro	6	2	8	3	12	3	11	7	4
16	Hungary									

Detailed voting results from Hungary (Final)
R/O	Country	Z. Palásti Kovács	K. Kovács	A. Náksi	P. Dorozsmai	V. Tóth	Jury Rank	Televote Rank	Combined Rank	Points
01	Ukraine	17	8	8	17	7	10	12	9	2
02	Belarus	18	19	12	20	9	18	11	15	
03	Azerbaijan	2	6	10	5	1	2	25	12	
04	Iceland	13	20	1	18	8	11	8	6	5
05	Norway	12	24	24	11	12	21	9	18	
06	Romania	19	7	21	12	19	17	15	21	
07	Armenia	5	12	15	3	17	9	5	4	7
08	Montenegro	20	3	4	6	10	5	24	17	
09	Poland	9	13	22	8	22	15	7	8	3
10	Greece	25	14	25	25	25	25	18	23	
11	Austria	8	9	5	16	11	8	2	2	10
12	Germany	16	15	20	15	15	19	10	14	
13	Sweden	11	10	7	4	13	6	6	3	8
14	France	22	21	23	24	23	24	22	25	
15	Russia	15	16	11	21	14	16	13	16	
16	Italy	14	22	14	23	18	22	23	24	
17	Slovenia	21	11	13	10	6	13	17	19	
18	Finland	1	23	6	9	24	14	1	5	6
19	Spain	7	4	9	14	4	4	20	11	
20	Switzerland	4	17	19	22	20	20	4	10	1
21	Hungary									
22	Malta	3	5	18	13	21	12	19	20	
23	Denmark	23	25	16	19	16	23	14	22	
24	Netherlands	6	1	3	1	5	1	3	1	12
25	San Marino	24	2	2	7	3	3	16	7	4
26	United Kingdom	10	18	17	2	2	7	21	13	
