= Fool Moon (band) =

Hungarian band

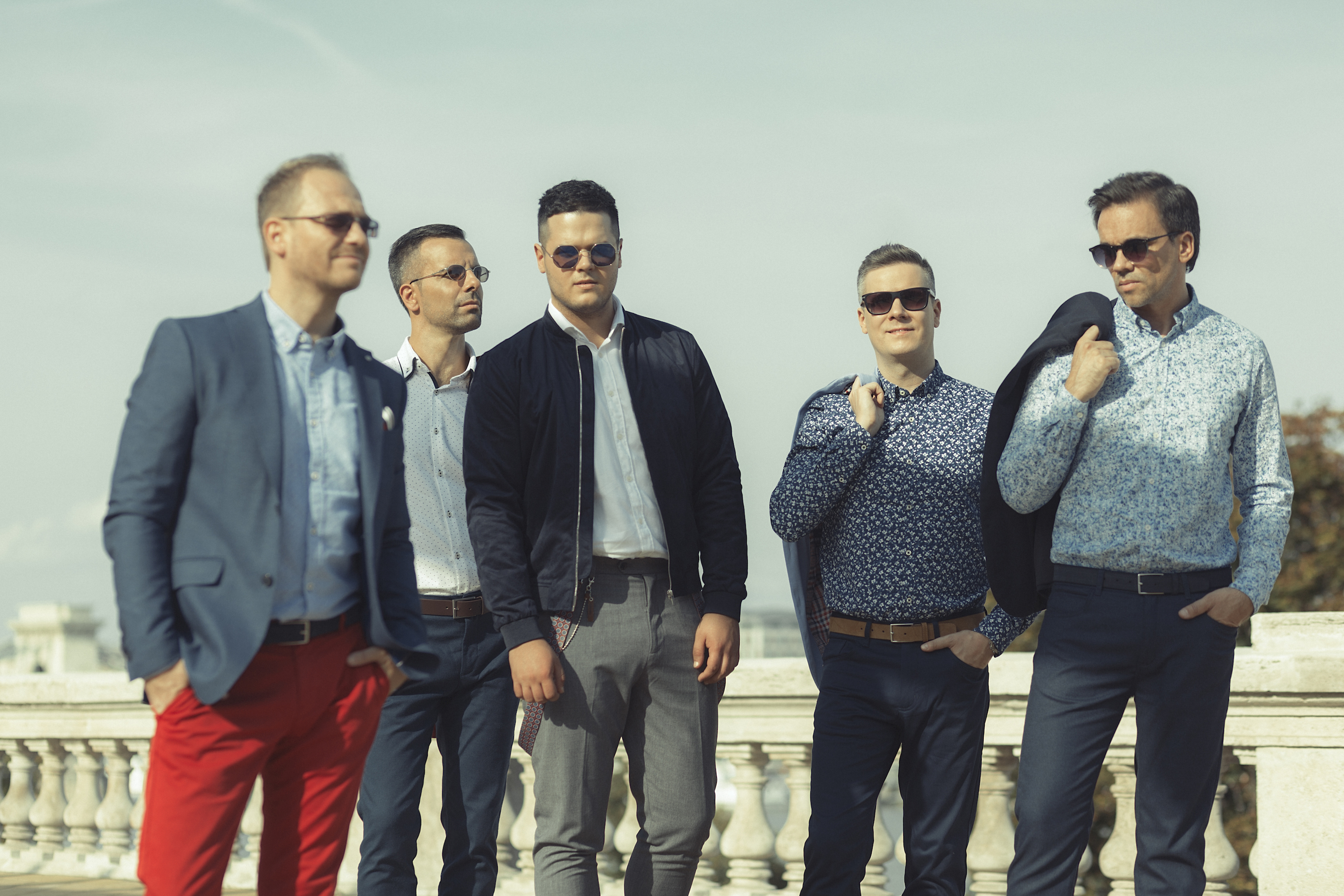
- Fool Moon in 2021

Background information
- Origin: Szeged, Hungary
- Genres: A cappella, vocal pop
- Years active: 2001–present
- Labels: Schubert Music Publishing, MDB Records, Warner-Magneoton
- Members: Gábor Molnár; Miklós Németh; Barnabás Wodala; Tamás Mészáros; Bence Vavra
- Past members: Máté Deák (2001-2002); András Deák (2001-2003); Ignác Czutor (2001-2008); Gergő Rácz (2005-2015); Márk Zentai (2015-2017)
- Website: foolmoon.hu

Fool Moon is an a cappella group formed in Szeged, Hungary in September 2001. Through their out-of-the-ordinary music lessons, master classes and TV appearances, Fool Moon has brought the pop-acappella genre to the centre of attention in Hungary.

Fool Moon has so far released 7 albums, got 13 international and Hungarian awards and prizes, and the band has collaborated with many of the most prestigious artists of the Hungarian music scene.

The group released its debut album titled Stars in 2003 featuring their own five part a cappella arrangements of Hungarian pop hits. Apart from Hungarian songs, the repertoire of Fool Moon includes songs in French, Italian, Russian and in English; a cappella versions of songs from artists such as Sting, Eric Clapton, Bruno Mars, Michael Jackson and George Michael. Moreover, their album Acappelland (2008) contains a song in Bantu.

In 2008, their joint project with Kriszta Kovats titled Arany-óra was a powerful attempt to press the limits of performing Hungarian literature in a cappella.

In 2012, Fool Moon composed their first original Hungarian pop a cappella hit, the first Hungarian a cappella pop song, titled “Kettesben jó”. The song was commissioned for a Hungarian youth film titled Sherlock Holmes nevében and was played during the film's end credits in cinemas in Hungary and abroad.

In December 2012, they went on an advent tour with Takács Nikolas, and the album Music & Soul, which captured the songs performed in this tour, peaked on Hungarian pop charts.

Fool Moon also pioneered as the first acappella group to enter A Dal, the Hungarian round of the Eurovision Song Contest, where they came in second with their song It Can't Be Over, which placed the band as well as pop acappella in the spotlight in Hungary.

== Collaborations ==
Ever since the band formed, Fool Moon has worked together with many other Hungarian artists including Gábor Presser (“1 koncert”), Zséda (“Ünnep”), Péter Szolnoki (Bon-Bon album Dupla élvezet), Andrea Malek (“Retúr”), Adrienn Szekeres (“Olyan mint te”), Edina Szirtes (“Mókus”), Kriszta Kováts (“Arany-óra”), Magna Cum Laude (“Magnatofon”), András Laár ("Edebede bácsi a télapó") and Marton Edvin.

In addition, the band took part in the Eurovision Song Contest held in Belgrade in 2008 with the Hungarian contestant Csézy as backing singers.

== Performances ==
Fool Moon regularly sings at a number of international festivals, in which they have shared the stage with many stars of the international a cappella scene (New York Voices, The Swingles, Rock4, Acappella ExpreSSS, Vocal Sampling, Idea of North, Naturally 7). Throughout their career, Fool Moon has performed in 15 countries including Russia, Taiwan, Japan, China, Korea, Singapore, Spain, Italy, Germany and the Netherlands.

== Cultural activities ==
With the aim of increasing the popularity of a cappella music, in 2005 Fool Moon launched the one and only a cappella event in Hungary, the Fool Moon International Acappella Festival in their home town of Szeged. Inviting vocalists and groups they have met during their performances throughout Europe and beyond, the band has continued to organize this unique festival each Autumn with ever increasing popularity and success.

Fool Moon has given over 1000 lectures on the history of a cappella singing throughout Hungary, organized by the Hungarian Philharmonic Society for 6 to 18-year-old students.

== International and Hungarian Awards ==
- 2003 - Ward Swingle Award 3. prize
- 2005 - Ward Swingle Award 1. prize
- 2006 - Taiwan International Acappella Award
  - 1. prize
  - Best Soloist (Ignac Czutor)
  - Best Arrangement (Miklos Nemeth for "Love, Love")
- 2008 - CARA nomination in Best Folk/World Song category ("Love, Love")
- 2010 - Best Arrangement ("Love, Love"), Solevoci International Acappella Contest
- 2013 - Music & Soul CD - Fonogram prize nomination
- 2015 - Kölcsey-prize of Szeged City for the band's cultural activities
- 2015 - Best of Budapest prize
- 2015 - CARA nomination for The Best Humor Song category (Hello.tourist!, arr. Németh Miklós)
- 2017 - Moscow Spring Acappella Contest 1. prize
- 2018 - Moscow Spring Acappella Contest 1. prize
- 2019 - Return 2 Acappelland - Fonogram prize nomination
- 2019 - 2 CARAs (Contemporary Acappella Recording Award) for Best Folk/World Song (Duna vizén..., Szirtes Edina, arr. Németh Miklós) and Best Funk/Disco Song (Derzhi, Dima Bilan, arr. Molnár Gábor)
- 2020 - 2 AVA (A Cappella Video Awards) nominations in Outstanding Special/Visual Effects (Neverending Story, arr. Németh Miklós, video by Molnár Gábor) and Best Rock Video (Stairway to Heaven, arr. Németh Miklós, video by Molnár Gábor)
- 2021 - AVA winner in Best Rock Video category - Stairway to Heaven (arr. Németh Miklós, video by Molnár Gábor)
- 2024 - 4 AVA (Acappella Video Awards) nominations - (I've Had) The Time of My Life feat. Nika (Best Show Tunes/Soundtrack/Theme Song Video, Best Pop Video, Best Funk/Disco Video, Outcasting Special/Visual Effects)
- 2025 - AVA winner in Best Funk/Disco Video category - (I've Had) The Time of My Life feat. Nika

== Discography ==
=== Albums ===
- 2003: Csillagok... ("Stars...")
- 2003: Vigyél el (SP)
- 2005: Merry Christmas
- 2006: 5election (Taiwan only)
- 2008: Arany-óra (Kováts Kriszta & Fool Moon)
- 2008: Acappelland
- 2010: 10 years (Taiwan only)
- 2012: GeorgeMichaelJackson5
- 2012: Music & Soul (Takács Nikolas & Fool Moon)
- 2014: Kettesben jó
- 2018: Return 2 Acappelland

== See also ==
- Hungarian pop
