= Megasztár =

Hungarian television series

- Genre: Reality competition
- Country of origin: Hungary
- Original language: Hungarian
- No. of seasons: 8

Production
- Camera setup: Multi-camera
- Running time: 90 mins

Original release
- Network: TV2
- Release: 11 October 2003 – 25 May 2012
- Release: 22 September 2024 – present

Megasztár – Voice of the Year is a Hungarian music talent show that started in 2003 on TV2. While it is widely considered an unlicensed clone of the British television show Pop Idol (and sometimes even referred to as Hungarian Idol), TV2 maintains that it is a distinct format created by SBS management member Christoph Buerge. The sixth season was the last, because TV2 bought the license of The Voice. On 21 February 2024, TV2 announced that after 12 years, Megasztár would return to the screen with a new season.

== Impact ==
The show is notable for not only stirring up but, in the end, radically changing the pop music world in the Hungary of the 2000s, often criticized due to the lack of original talent that Megasztár set out to find. As Péter Geszti said during the third-season finale, "Hungarian pop musicians are afraid of Megasztár singers because the latter are extruding the former from the pop market."

Indeed, three albums from Megasztár singers already finished in Hungary's official top ten sales list, and by 2005, five of the top ten sellers were Megasztár-related albums.

== Show format ==
=== Auditions ===
Auditions for each season are organized in the summer. In these, entrants (the number of whom reached several tens of thousands by season 3) each introduce themselves in front of the jury (already familiar with their application, consisting of a CV and a number of songs given as favorites) with a song either selected by them or the jury, who may either ask them to stop or continue based on their performance.

=== Semi-finals ===
From the auditions fifty people are selected, who, in groups of ten, participate in semi-finals in the autumn, singing one song selected by themselves, and with the jury selecting the best two each time to participate in the finals. The jury also has to pick an additional singer each time to participate in a special semi-final, where two more singers are also picked up for the finals, but this time the audience vote for the singers by phone and text messages (and in season 3, via the internet as well).

=== Finals and elimination ===
The finals are organized in the spring, where finalists are eliminated one by one, based on the audience's votes. In the inaugural season, the singer with the fewest votes was eliminated. In season 2, the jury chose one singer to continue from the two with the fewest votes. In season 3, the jury chose a singer to continue from the three singers with the fewest votes, the remaining two having to sing a 'duel' for the audience's votes.

=== Prizes ===
The grand prize for the winner of the first series of Megasztár was a contract at a record company. Because of the show's high popularity, however, most singers of all editions were given their own contracts in the end. From season 2, winners were also promised a car and a flat in a newly built apartment block, the latter leading to some controversy as the flat which the season 2 winner was promised to have by the end of 2005 was still not built in May 2006.

== The jury ==
Former jury members Lead jury members were also the show's producers in charge of music.

- Tamás Z. 'Pierrot' Marosi (seasons 1–2)
- Péter Novák (season 3)
- Gyöngyi 'Soma' Spitzer, jazz singer (seasons 1–3)
- Gábor Presser, musician, member of legendary 1970s Hungarian rock group LGT (seasons 1-3 and 5)
- Tibor 'Settenkedő' Bakács, critic (seasons 1–3)
- Barna Pély, jazz musician and singer of the group called United (seasons 1–3)
- Enikő Eszenyi, actress (seasons 4–5)
- Tamás Mester, singer (seasons 4–6)
- Sándor Friderikusz, TV presenter (seasons 4–5)
- Miklós Fenyő, singer (seasons 4)

Final jury members

- Zoltán Bereczki, actor and singer (season 6)
- Mariann Falusi, singer (season 6)
- Tamás Mester, singer (seasons 4–6)
- Gábor Bochkor, radio personality (season 6)

== Finalists ==
Season 1

- Vera Tóth - winner
- Ibolya Oláh - runner up
- László Gáspár - 3rd place
- Evelyne Kandech - 4th place
- Vera Schmidt - 5th place
- Edmond Géza Nagy - 6th place
- Leslie Szabó - 7th place
- Barbara Schmidt - 8th place
- Henrietta Dér - 9th place
- Zoltán Mujahid - 10th place
- Dorina Galambos - 11th place
- Gergő Aczél - 12th place

Season 2

- Ferenc "Caramel" Molnár - winner
- Tamás Palcsó - runner-up
- Gabi Tóth - 3rd place (younger sister of first series winner Veronika Tóth)
- Dániel Torres - 4th place
- Csaba "Boogie" Gál - 5th place
- Eszter Bartók - 6th place
- Ádám Bálint - 7th place
- Tamás Pál - 8th place
- Levente Bella - 9th place
- Tímea Kovács - 10th place
- Orsolya Pflum - 11th place
- Ivett Kósa - 12th place

Season 3

- Magdolna Rúzsa - winner
- Varga Ferenc - runner-up
- Angéla Póka - 3rd place
- Eszter Szabó - 4th place
- Tamás Kontor - 5th place
- Bíborka Bocskor - 6th place
- Anikó Baktai - 7th place
- Péter Puskás - 8th place
- Mónika Hoffmann - 9th place
- István Varga - 10th place
- Szabolcs Oláh - 11th place
- Izabella Széles - 12th place

Season 4

- Viktor Király - winner
- Dávid Fekete - runner-up
- Krisztián Lakatos - 3rd place
- Lüszi Tóth - 4th place
- Tamara Bencsik - 5th place
- Nguyen Thanh Hien - 6th place
- Karin Szecsődi - 7th place
- Sonia Nkuya - 8th place
- Attila Ásós - 9th place
- Imre Balogh - 10th place

Season 5

- Renáta Tolvai - winner
- Attila Kökény - runner-up
- Melinda Szíj - 3rd place
- András Kállay-Saunders - 4th place
- Djordjevic István "Giorgio" - 5th place
- Yvette Lakatos - 6th place
- Dávid Szeleczki - 7th place
- Anna Patai - 8th place (youngest competitor, age 11)
- Bence Gusztos - 9th place
- Fivérek - 10th place
- Adam's Comedy - 11th place
- Andreas Csonka - 12th place
- Bernadett Varga J. - 13th place

Season 6

- Gigi Radics - winner
- Andrea Szakos - runner-up
- Attila Talán - 3rd place
- Balázs Farkas-Jenser - 4th place
- Benji Burgess - 5th place
- Kristóf "Bozont" Nagy - 6th place
- Adri Nagy - 7th place
- Roland Bihal - 8th place
- Tímea Kullai - 9th place
- István Horváth - 10th place
- Ádám Szűcs - 11th place
- Nóra Réti - 12th place

Season 7

- Máté Gudics - winner
- Rudolf Orbán - runner-up
- Rebeka Balogh - 3rd place
- Abigél Tóth - 4th place
- Dávid Dénes - 5th place
- Petronella Bánsági - 6th place
- József Szilágyi - 7th place
- Róbert Dányi - 8th place
- Kata Baráth - 9th place
- Jennifer Kiszel - 10th place
- Doma Papp - 11th place
- Patrik Buzási - 12th place
- Zsanett Imreh - 13th place
