= A Dal 2020 =

- Season 9
- Presented by: Freddie and Lili Rókusfalvy
- Winners: Gergő Rácz and Reni Orsovai with Mostantól

Release
- Original network: MTVA (Hungary)

Season chronology
- ← Previous; A Dal 2019

A Dal 2020 is the ninth season of Hungarian music contest A Dal, held between 1 February and 7 March 2020 at the Studio 1 of MTVA in Budapest, Hungary. This season was the first one in the history of the show not to be used as Hungary's national selection for the Eurovision Song Contest, as the broadcaster decided not to participate in the 2020 contest. While various media speculated that this move was related to the rise of anti-LGBT+ sentiment among the leadership of Hungary and the broadcaster itself, no official reasons were cited by the organizers or the broadcaster. MTVA did however deny that the withdrawal was in any way related to that. Regarding A Dal, the broadcaster decided to renew the show in 2020, explaining that the focus was now on 'supporting talented musicians from the Hungarian pop scene.'

== Format ==
The competition consisted of 30 entries competing in three heats, two semi-finals, and a final. The hosts for all the shows were Lili Rókusfalvy and, for the third year in a row, Freddie; winner of A Dal 2016. All shows were broadcast from 19:35 CET on Duna.

In the semifinals and the final, the artists were allowed to choose between performing with live instrumentation or a backing track.

The voting in all rounds before the final underwent some changes for 2020, giving a lot more power to the televote (as the jury–televote ratio is now a 50:50 split). After each performance, every individual jury awarded a score from 1 to 10 to the act. They can only give one set of 10 points per show and if an act gets 10 points from all four judges (40 points in total) they advance automatically to the next stage of the show. Then, after all performances are over, the phone lines will open for ten minutes and viewers will be able to call or send an SMS (up to 25 times per show) in order to vote for their favorite entries. When the voting closes, the act with the fewest votes will be automatically eliminated regardless of how the jury voted. The jury will then eliminate another act by themselves, independently of the public vote. The voting opens again for the eight remaining acts and their votes will be converted to the same format as the jury votes with the top entries (six in the heats and four in the semi-finals) qualifying to the next stage. The final had the same voting format as usual, though: the jury voted after all performances giving scores to their top 4 (4, 6, 8 and 10 points). These top 4 acts would go on to a second round where the public vote decided the winner of A Dal 2020.

The four jury members were:

- Bence Apáti: Hungarian ballet dancer, publicist, director of the Budapest Operetta Theater
- Feró Nagy: singer-songwriter, frontman of Beatrice and Ős-Bikini, judge in the first three seasons of X Factor Hungary (he mentored the winner, Csaba Vastag, in the first season)
- Barna Pély: jazz singer winner of the Artistjus award, frontman of the Hungarian rock band United, jury in the first three seasons of Megasztár
- Lilla Vincze: singer-songwriter winner of the eMeRTon award, Napoleon Boulevard, member of the Hungarian 2018 Eurovision jury

Alongside the main award of the contest (a monetary prize of HUF 75 million and promotion at the national radio station Petőfi Radio), the organization of the show awarded three extra awards in different categories during the final of the show:

- Best Discovery from A Dal 2020: Tortuga
- Best Lyrics from A Dal 2020: Dénes Pál - Készen állsz
- Best Acoustic Version: Gergő Rácz and Reni Orsovai - Mostantól

== Participants ==
The 30 participants, selected by an internal jury from 559 submissions, were revealed on 17 December 2019 ahead of a press conference the following day.

A Dal 2020 entries
Artist	Song	Songwriters
Attila Kökény	"Búcsúznom kell"	Lajos Havas
Bogi Nagy	"Maradok"	Ferenc Molnár "Caramel"
Dániel Molnár	"Ábránd"	Tamás Horvát, Dániel Molnár
Dénes Pál	"Tudom (Készen állsz)"	Denés Pál
Diana	"Menedék"	Viktor Rakonczai, Mátyás Szepesi
Fatal Error	"Néma"	Mihály Balázs, Bence Joós, Botond Kornyik, Dávid Rónai, Zsolt Rimóczi
Gábor Heincz "Biga"	"Máshol járunk"	Gábor Heincz "Biga", Mátyás Szepesi
Gergő Rácz & Reni Orsovai	"Mostantól"	Máté Bella, Gergő Rácz, Szabolcs Hujber
HolyChicks	"Pillangóhatás"	Éva Hunyadkürti, Krisztina Lahucski, Zsuzsa Seprenyi, Vivien Tiszai
Horus x Marcus feat. Bori Fekete	"Tiszavirág"	Norbert Kovács, Teodóra Nagy, Bori Fekete
Kati Wolf	"Próbáld még"	Péter Krajczár, Katalin Wolf, Eszter Major
Kies	"Az egyetlen"	Milán Kiss, Gergely Kovács, Ádám Szűcs, Ferenc Kaldenekker
Konyha	"Még csak szavak"	Konyha
Márk Ember	"Tovább"	Márk Tibor Ember
MDC	"Más világ"	Miklós Bátori, Örs Lukács Siklósi
Mocsok 1 Kölykök	"Szerelem"	Ádám Csekő, Tamás Pulius, Ádám Horváth, Kristóf Molnár
Muriel	"Kávés"	Bence Jobbágy, Adrián Méhes
Nági	"Freedom – Felszállok a gépre"	Brigitta Nagy, Kata Kozma, Áron Sebestyén, Attila Krausz
Nene	"Későre jár"	Evelyn Boda, Péter Ferncz, József Markosi, Szabolcs Balázs Varga, Milán Vörös, Renáta Katalin Orsovai
Nikolas Takács	"Csendbeszéd"	Gábor Heincz, Mátyás Szepesi
Olivér Berkes	"Visszakér a múlt"	Zsolt Szepesi, Olivér Berkes, Szabolcs Hujber
Patikadomb	"Rólad"	Gábor Dobos, Attila Pap, Dániel Somogyvári, Gyula Újvári
Szabolcs Varga	"Pillanat"	Norbert Szűcs, Szabolcs Varga
Talk2night	"Veled minden"	Emil Wagner, Máté Bartók, Bence András Vavra, János Kosztyu
Timi Arany	"Hurrikán"	Timea Arany, Krisztina Juhász
Tortuga	"Mámor tér 3."	Sándor Dömötör, Ákos Kerle, Milán Tomku, Ábel Bendegúz Hegyi
Turbo	"Iránytű"	Jávor Jávorov Delov, Gábor Ruthner, György Szatmári, Balázs Tanka, Dávid Vigh
YA OU	"Légy valaki másnak"	Péter Ferencz, YA OU
Zaporozsec	"Találj rám"	Bence Varga
Zsóka Kóbor & Patrik Polgár	"Valamiért"	Patrik Polgár

== Shows ==
=== Heat 1 ===
Heat 1 – 1 February 2020
Draw	Artist	Song	Jury Votes				Televote	Total	Result
Draw	Artist	Song	B. Apáti	F. Nagy	B. Pély	L. Vincze	Televote	Total	Result
1	Talk2night	"Veled minden"	8	8	8	8	—	—	Eliminated
2	Szabolcs Varga	"Pillanat"	9	8	7	8	15	47	Advanced
3	Horus x Marcus feat. Bori Fekete	"Tiszavirág"	8	9	7	7	35	66	Advanced
4	YA OU	"Légy valaki másnak"	8	7	9	8	10	42	Eliminated
5	HolyChicks	"Pillangóhatás"	7	7	7	7	20	48	Advanced
6	Muriel	"Kávés"	9	6	9	10	5	39	Eliminated
7	Bogi Nagy	"Maradok"	8	9	9	8	25	59	Advanced
8	Zaporozsec	"Találj rám!"	7	5	5	7	—	—	Eliminated
9	Dénes Pal	"Készen állsz"	8	6	10	9	30	63	Advanced
10	Fatal Error	"Néma"	10	10	9	9	40	78	Advanced

=== Heat 2 ===
Automatic qualifier Jury and Televote qualifier

Heat 2 – 8 February 2020
Draw	Artist	Song	Jury Votes				Televote	Total	Result
Draw	Artist	Song	B. Apáti	F. Nagy	B. Pély	L. Vincze	Televote	Total	Result
1	Konyha	"Még csak szavak"	8	8	9	8	—	—	Eliminated
2	Nági	"Freedom – Felszállok a gépre"	7	7	8	7	16	45	Advanced
3	Kies	"Az egyetlen"	9	9	9	8	39	75	Advanced
4	Timi Arany	"Hurrikán"	7	6	8	7	—	—	Eliminated
5	Patikadomb	"Rólad"	7	7	7	8	—	—	Eliminated
6	Nikolas Takács	"Csendbeszéd"	9	8	9	8	28	62	Advanced
7	Kati Wolf	"Probáld még"	9	9	9	9	22	58	Advanced
8	Mocsok 1 Kölykök	"Szerelem"	8	8	9	8	10	43	Eliminated
9	Nene	"Későre jár"	10	10	10	10	—	—	Advanced
10	Dániel Molnár	"Ábránd"	8	8	8	9	34	67	Advanced

=== Heat 3 ===
Heat 3 – 15 February 2020
Draw	Artist	Song	Jury Votes				Televote	Total	Result
Draw	Artist	Song	B. Apáti	F. Nagy	B. Pély	L. Vincze	Televote	Total	Result
1	Turbo	"Iránytű"	9	10	10	9	25	63	Advanced
2	Diana	"Menedék"	7	5	5	7	—	—	Eliminated
3	Olivér Berkes	"Visszakér a múlt"	8	6	7	8	15	44	Eliminated
4	Zsóka Kóbor & Patrik Polgár	"Valamiért"	9	7	6	7	20	49	Advanced
5	Tortuga	"Mámor tér 3."	8	9	9	9	35	70	Advanced
6	Attila Kökény	"Búcsúznom kell"	9	9	8	8	10	44	Advanced
7	Márk Ember	"Tovább"	7	6	7	8	30	58	Advanced
8	MDC	"Más világ"	7	8	7	7	—	—	Eliminated
9	Gábor Heincz "Biga"	"Máshol járunk"	7	7	8	8	5	35	Eliminated
10	Gergő Rácz & Reni Orsovai	"Mostantól"	10	9	9	10	40	78	Advanced

=== Semi-final 1 ===
Automatic qualifier Jury and Televote qualifier

Semi-final 1 – 22 February 2020
Draw	Artist	Song	Jury Votes				Televote	Total	Result
Draw	Artist	Song	B. Apáti	F. Nagy	B. Pély	L. Vincze	Televote	Total	Result
1	Fatal Error	"Néma"	9	9	9	9	33	69	Advanced
2	Bogi Nagy	"Maradok"	8	9	9	9	19	54	Eliminated
3	Horus x Marcus feat. Bori Fekete	"Tiszavirág"	8	8	6	7	12	41	Eliminated
4	HolyChicks	"Pillangóhatás"	6	7	7	6	—	—	Eliminated
5	Szabolcs Varga	"Pillanat"	8	8	7	7	—	—	Eliminated
6	Gergő Rácz & Reni Orsovai	"Mostantól"	10	10	9	10	—	—	Advanced
7	Tortuga	"Mámor tér 3."	7	7	9	8	40	71	Advanced
8	Nági	"Freedom – Felszállok a gépre"	7	7	8	8	5	35	Eliminated
9	Nikolas Takács	Csendbeszéd	9	7	10	8	26	60	Advanced

=== Semi-final 2 ===
Semi-final 2 – 29 February 2020
Draw	Artist	Song	Jury Votes				Televote	Total	Result
Draw	Artist	Song	B. Apáti	F. Nagy	B. Pély	L. Vincze	Televote	Total	Result
1	Kati Wolf	"Próbáld még"	9	9	9	9	—	—	Eliminated
2	Dániel Molnár	"Ábránd"	8	8	7	8	5	36	Eliminated
3	Kies	"Az egyetlen"	6	7	6	7	—	—	Eliminated
4	Zsóka Kóbor & Patrik Polgár	"Valamiért"	9	6	6	6	33	60	Advanced
5	Nene	"Későre jár"	9	8	8	9	26	60	Advanced
6	Dénes Pál	"Tudom (Készen állsz)"	8	7	9	9	12	45	Eliminated
7	Turbo	"Iránytű"	10	10	10	9	—	—	Advanced
8	Márk Ember	"Tovább"	8	8	8	8	40	72	Advanced
9	Attila Kökény	"Búcsúznom kell"	9	9	9	8	19	54	Eliminated

=== Final ===
Advanced to the second round Winner

Final – 7 March 2020
Draw	Artist	Song	B. Apáti	F. Nagy	B. Pély	L. Vincze	Total	Result
1	Fatal Error	"Néma"	4	8	—	—	12	—
2	Gergő Rácz & Orsovai Reni	"Mostantól"	8	6	8	10	32	1
3	Márk Ember	"Tovább"	—	—	6	8	14	
4	Turbo	"Iránytű"	6	10	10	4	30	
5	Nikolas Takács	"Csendbeszéd"	—	—	4	—	4	—
6	Tortuga	"Mámor tér 3."	—	—	—	—	0	—
7	Zsóka Kóbor & Patrik Polgár	"Valamiért"	—	—	—	—	0	—
8	Nene	"Későre jár"	10	4	—	6	20	

== Ratings ==
Show	Broadcast time	Duna			Source
Show	Broadcast time	Absolute audience	Share	Weekly ranking	Source
Heat 1	Saturday 1 February 2020, 19:35	204,000	4.7%	30+	
Heat 2	Saturday 8 February 2020, 19:35	211,506	5.1%	29	
Heat 3	Saturday 15 February 2020, 19:35	242,806	5.7%	25	
Semi-final 1	Saturday 22 February 2020, 19:35	218,000	2.6%	30+	
Semi-final 2	Saturday 29 February 2020, 19:35	218,000	5.0%	30+	
Final	Saturday 7 March 2020, 19:35	271,946	6.3%	21	
