= Attila Kökény =

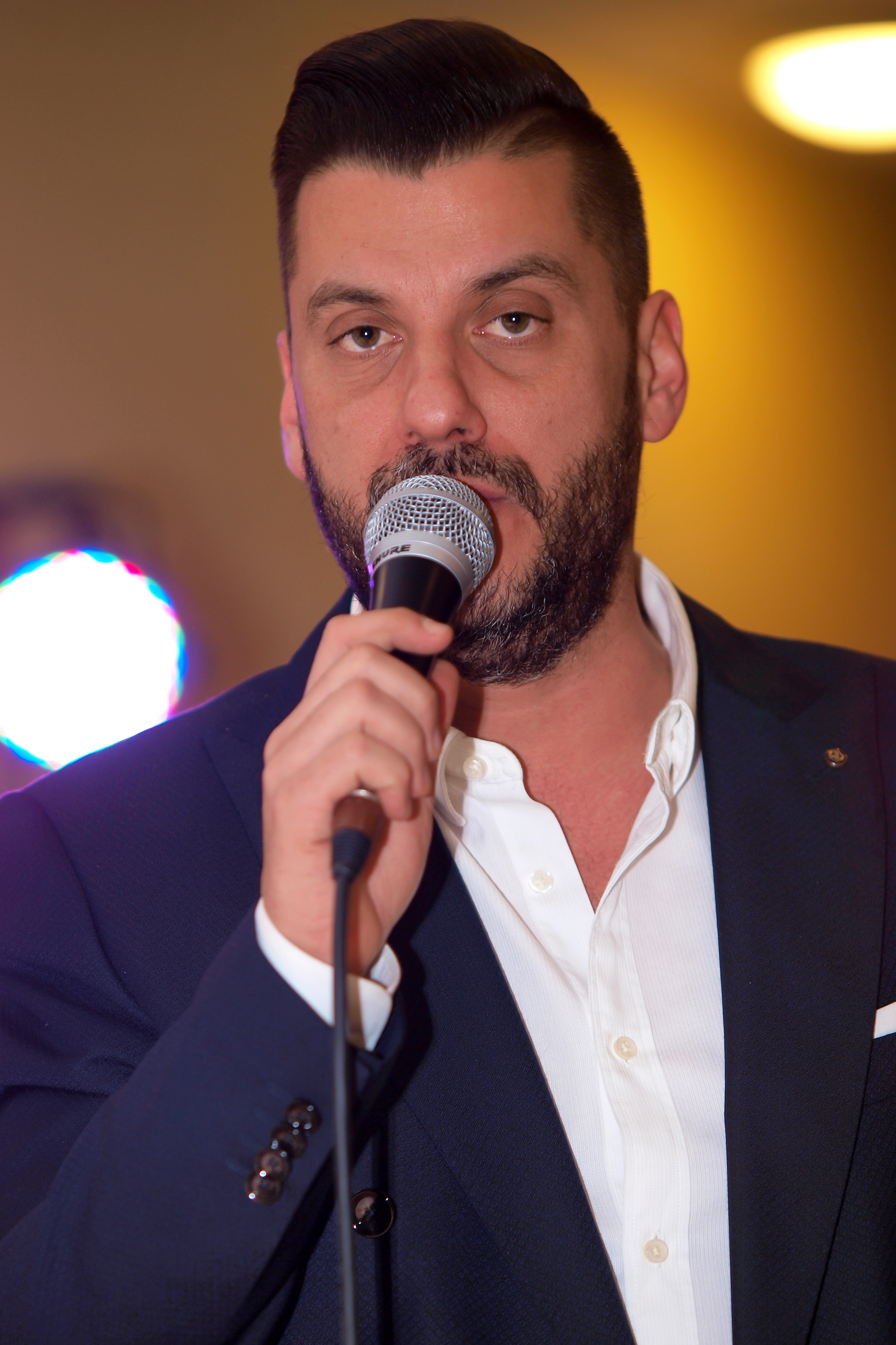
- Kökény in 2014

Background information
- Born: 20 April 1975 (age 51); Budapest, Hungary
- Genres: Pop
- Occupation: Singer
- Instrument: vocals
- Years active: 2000 – present

Attila Kökény (born 20 April 1975, Budapest) is a Hungarian singer, most notable for coming second in the fifth season of Megasztár and for his participation in A Dal.

== Career ==
Kökény began singing in 2000. He has been playing on boats and in night bars for years. He has been playing piano for 20 years. He writes his songs. He was in a band with Kálmán Nyári named FAIN. He came second in the fifth season of Megasztár, only behind winner Reni Tolvai.

In 2012, Kökény was the first ever participant in A Dal, the Hungarian national selection process for the Eurovision Song Contest, performing first in the first semi-final of A Dal 2012, in a duet with Tamara Bencsik with the song Állítsd Meg Az Időt!. They ranked 8th in the semi-final and did not advance to the final. On 6 December 2017, it was announced that he will compete in the 2018 edition of A Dal, for the Eurovision Song Contest 2018 in Lisbon, Portugal with the song Életre kel, in a trio with Nikoletta Szőke and Róbert Szakcsi Lakatos. They were eliminated in the semi-finals.

He is married and the father of three children.

== Awards ==
- Magyar Toleranciadíj (2013)
- Jótékonysági Díj (2015)

== Discography ==
- Nincs semmi másom (2011) Universal/Zebra
- Mese az álomról (2012)
- Hol az a perc (2014) Mistral
- Karácsonyi dalok (2015) Mistral
- Elmegyek – Válogatás Máté Péter dalaiból (2016) Mistral
