= Gábor Heincz =

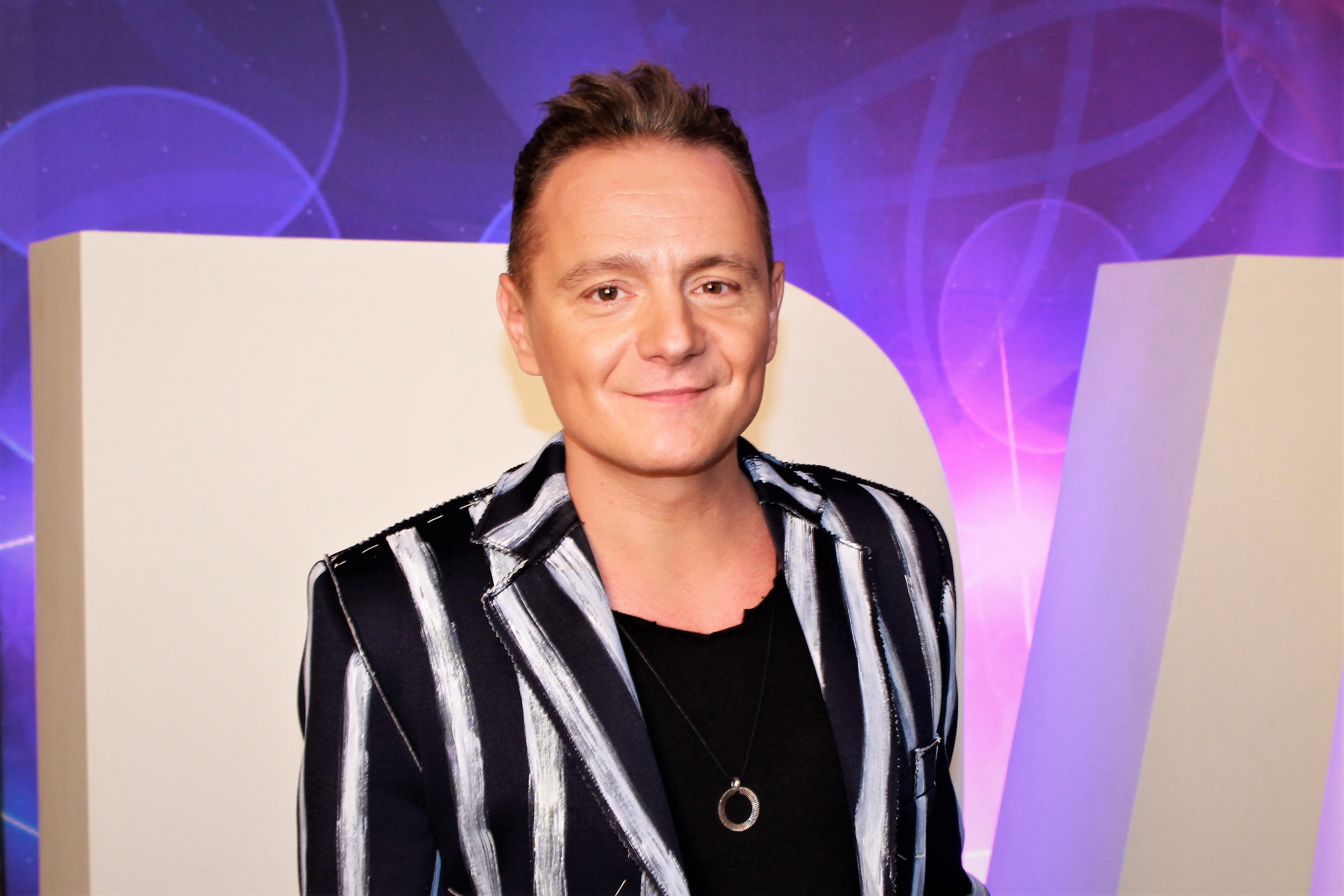
- Heincz in 2018

Background information
- Born: 18 November 1974 (age 51); Budapest, Hungary
- Occupation: Singer
- Instruments: vocals, guitar
- Years active: 2005 – present

Gábor "Biga" Heincz (born 18 November 1974, Budapest) is a Hungarian singer and performer, notable for being a finalist in A Dal 2012 and A Dal 2018.

== Career ==
In 2005, Heincz joined the third season of TV2's Megasztár, but did not make the live shows. He was a backing singer for Zoli Ádok at the Eurovision Song Contest 2009 in Moscow, Russia for his song Dance with Me. He has worked with such artists as Ákos Dobrády and Viktor Varga.

His popularity began with M1's inaugural edition of A Dal in 2012 with the song Learning to Let Go for a chance to go to the Eurovision Song Contest 2012 in Baku, Azerbaijan. He reached the top four in the finals, but the jury chose Compact Disco to represent Hungary. Despite not winning, his song went on to top the charts in Hungary. His song was sung in TV2's The Voice – Magyarország hangja by Viktor Weisz.

He was featured in TV2's Sztárban sztár in 2013.

On 6 December 2017, it was announced that Heincz will compete in the 2018 edition of A Dal for the Eurovision Song Contest 2018 in Lisbon, Portugal with the song Good Vibez. First, on 27 January 2018, he went on stage in the second heat, where he came in tied second place with yesyes with 43 points and went to the semi-finals. On 10 February 2018, from the first semi-final, he scored 42 points and qualified from the semi-final, and competed in the final of the show.

== Awards ==
- Fonogram – Hungarian Music Prize (2014) – Pop Rock song of the year (with Easy Loving)

== Discography ==
=== Studio albums ===
- Gátlás sztriptíz (2017)

=== Singles ===
- Learning to Let Go (2012)
- Easy Loving (2013)
- A zene te vagy (2015) (with Janka)
- Alright (2016)
- Gátlás sztriptíz (2016)
- Mondd miért (2016)
- Bipolár (2017)
- Halhatatlan Blues (2017) (with Wolfie)
- Good Vibez (2017)
