= Zsolt Süle =

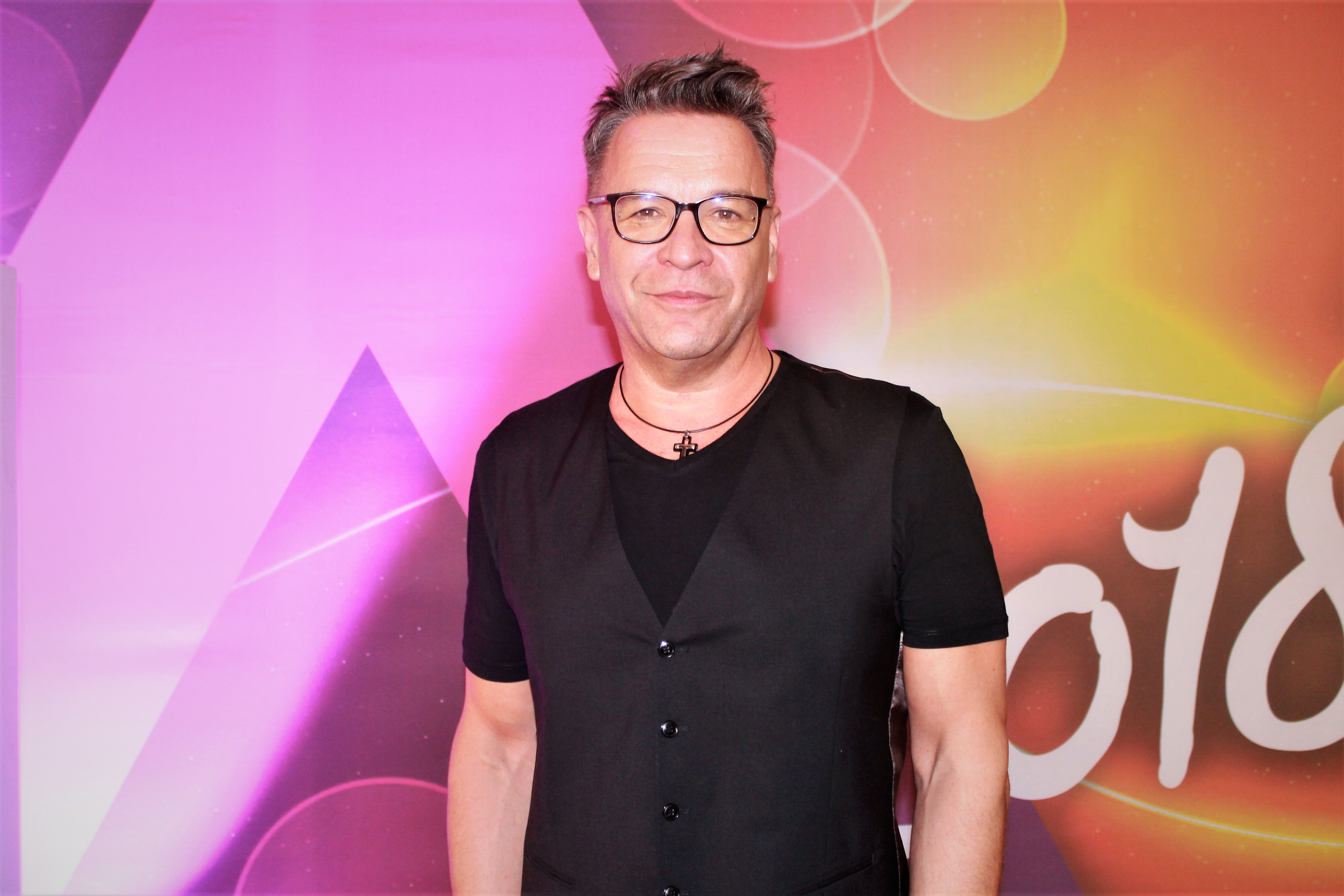
- Süle in 2018

Background information
- Born: 28 January 1969 (age 57); Veszprém, Hungary
- Occupations: Singer, cook
- Instruments: vocals, piano, guitar
- Years active: 1983 – present

Zsolt Süle (born 28 January 1969) is a Hungarian singer-songwriter, and part-time cook, best-known for being a finalist in A Dal 2018.

== Career ==
Süle went to the Secondary School for Catering and later worked in the hospitality industry. His father was a musician, playing on the saxophone. Süle wanted to be a musician in his childhood, but he was also interested in acting. At the age of 14 he founded his first band, Story, where he was a drummer.

Later, he also wrote lyrics and founded the band Sansz, which had a repertoire of his own songs, and also appeared on Ki mit tud?. Here he met Krisztián Nyakas, György Csoknyai and Imre Holubecz. He started playing LGT songs with them, initially for themselves and then for the public. They had a concert in a theatre in Veszprém for Miénk a cirkusz, playing an LGT song.

Süle has also been a member of other bands alongside LGT, one of whom was Mozizenekar, where he produced his own compositions. ÉSTE was founded in 2014, where the poems and lyrics of Gergely Trócsányi's poems were put to music. Their first album was released in the first year. In 2016, the composer also performed at the Interferences International Theatre Meeting in Cluj-Napoca and at the Water Music Flower Festival in Tata.

On 6 December 2017, it was announced that Süle will compete in A Dal 2018, the Hungarian national selection process for the Eurovision Song Contest 2018 in Lisbon, Portugal with the song Zöld a május. First, on 20 January 2018, he went on stage in the first heat, where he won a tied first place with Leander Kills and went to the semi-finals. On 10 February 2018, from the first semi-final, he scored 45 points and reached second place, and competed in the final of the show.

== Discography ==
=== Singles ===
- Zöld a május (2018)
