= Dancs =

Dancs is a Hungarian surname. Notable people with the surname include:

- Annamari Dancs (born 1981), Romanian-Hungarian singer
- Roland Dancs (born 1985), Hungarian footballer
