= Ádám Szabó =

Ádám Szabó may refer to:

- Ádám Szabó (footballer)
- Ádám Szabó (singer)
