= Hungary in the Eurovision Song Contest 2018 =

Hungarian entry for the Eurovision Song Contest 2018

- Eurovision Song Contest 2018
- Country: Hungary
- Selection process: A Dal 2018
- Selection date: 24 February 2018

Competing entry
- Song: "Viszlát nyár"
- Artist: AWS
- Songwriters: Bence Brucker; Dániel Kökényes; Áron Veress; Soma Schiszler; Örs Siklósi

Placement
- Semi-final result: Qualified (10th, 111 points)
- Final result: 21st place, 93 points

Participation chronology

Hungary was represented at the Eurovision Song Contest 2018. The local Media Services and Support Trust Fund (MTVA) and the Hungarian broadcaster Duna Media Service organised the national final A Dal 2018 in order to select the Hungarian entry for the 2018 contest in Lisbon, Portugal.

== Background ==
Prior to the 2018 contest, Hungary had participated in the Eurovision Song Contest fourteen times since its first entry in 1994. Hungary's best placing in the contest was fourth, which they achieved with their début entry in 1994 with the song "Kinek mondjam el vétkeimet?" performed by Friderika Bayer. Hungary had attempted participate in the contest in 1993, however, their entry was eliminated in the preselection show Kvalifikacija za Millstreet. Hungary withdrew from the contest for six years between 1999 and 2004 and also missed the 2006 and 2010 contests. In 2014, Hungary achieved their second best result in the contest since their début, placing fifth with the song "Running" performed by András Kállay-Saunders. In 2016, Hungary placed 19th in the Eurovision final with the song "Pioneer" performed by Freddie. Next year they managed to finish in the top 10 again, now in the 8th place with "Origo" sang by Joci Pápai.

The Hungarian national broadcaster, Media Services and Support Trust Fund (MTVA), broadcasts the event within Hungary and organises the selection process for the nation's entry. MTVA confirmed their intentions to participate at the 2018 Eurovision Song Contest on 10 October 2017. Since 2012, MTVA has organised A Dal, a national selection show which has managed to, thus far, produce entries that have qualified the nation to the final of the Eurovision Song Contest each year and has resulted in three top 10 placings in 2013, 2014 and 2017.

== Before Eurovision ==
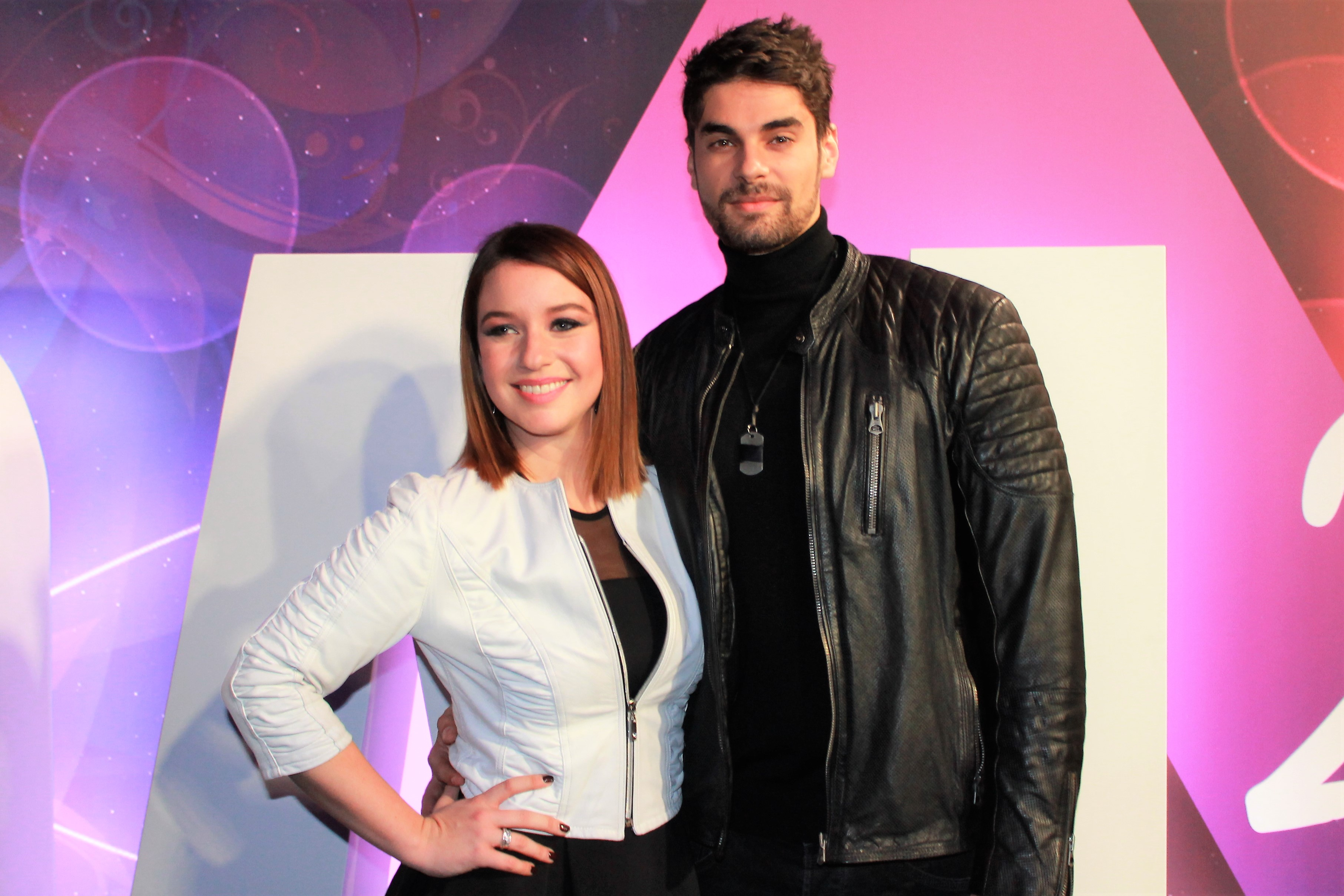
Kriszta Rátonyi and Freddie, the hosts of A Dal 2018

=== A Dal 2018 ===
A Dal 2018 was the seventh edition of the Hungarian national selection A Dal, which selected Hungary's entry for the Eurovision Song Contest 2018. The competition consisted of 30 entries competing in three heats, two semi-finals, and a final. The hosts were Kriszta Rátonyi and Freddie.

==== Format ====
===== Judges =====
The jury panel consisted of four people:

- Judit Schell: actress
- Misi Mező: the lead singer and guitarist of the Hungarian band Magna Cum Laude
- Károly Frenreisz: one of the biggest names and composers of the so called Big Generation, band-member of Metro, LGT and Skorpió
- Miklós Both: two times Fonogram-award winner performer and composer.
The A Dal 2018 judges

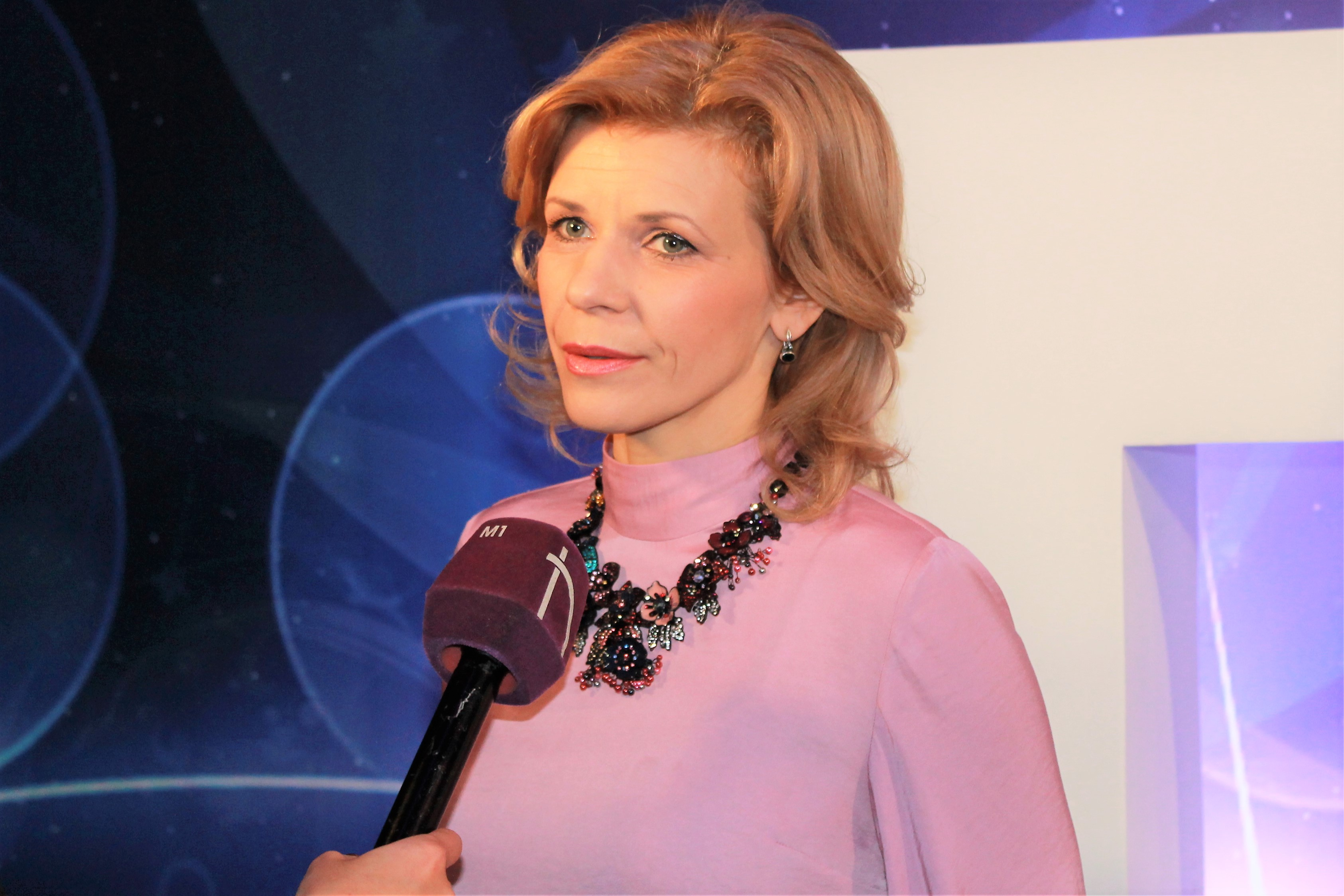
Judit Schell

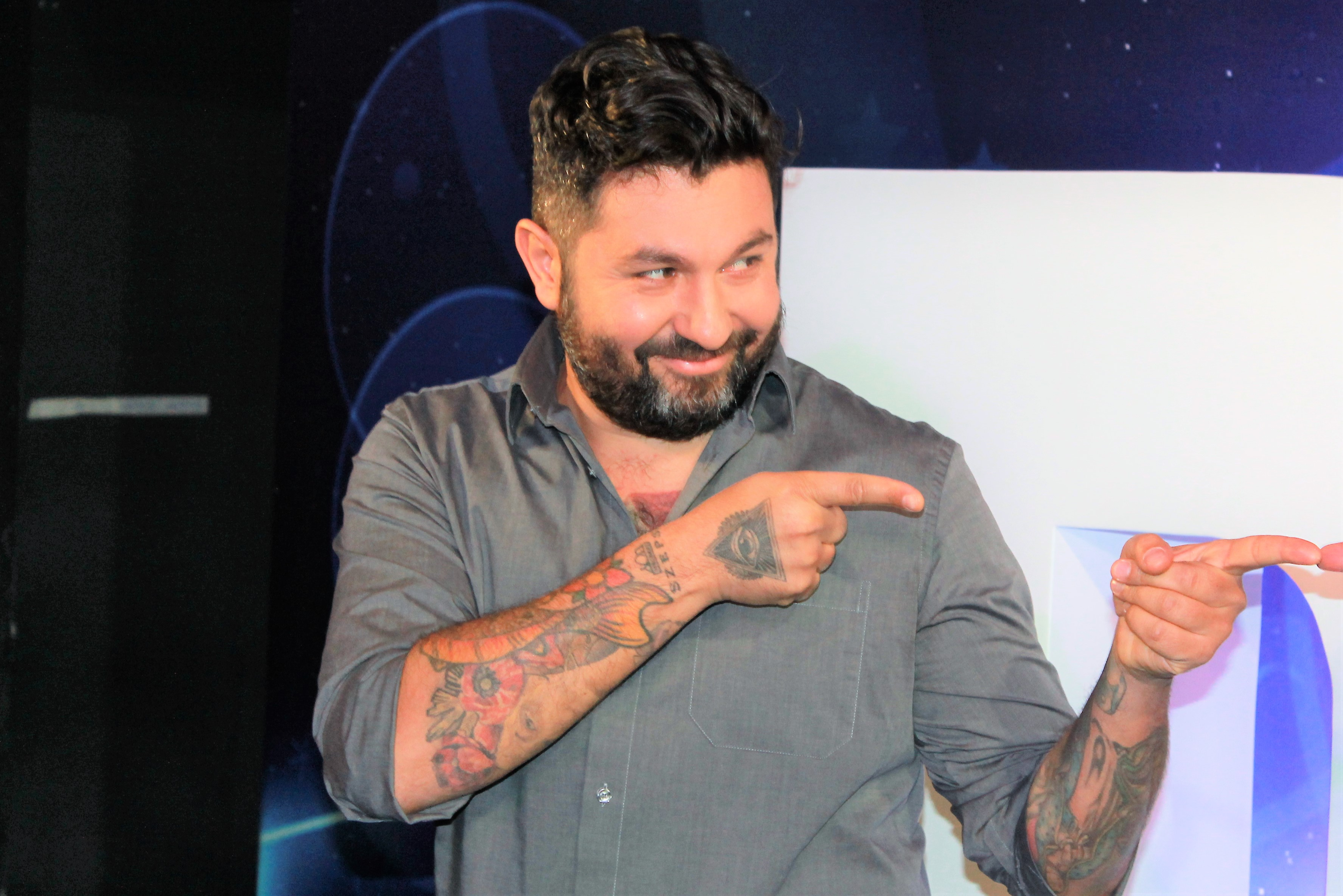
Misi Mező

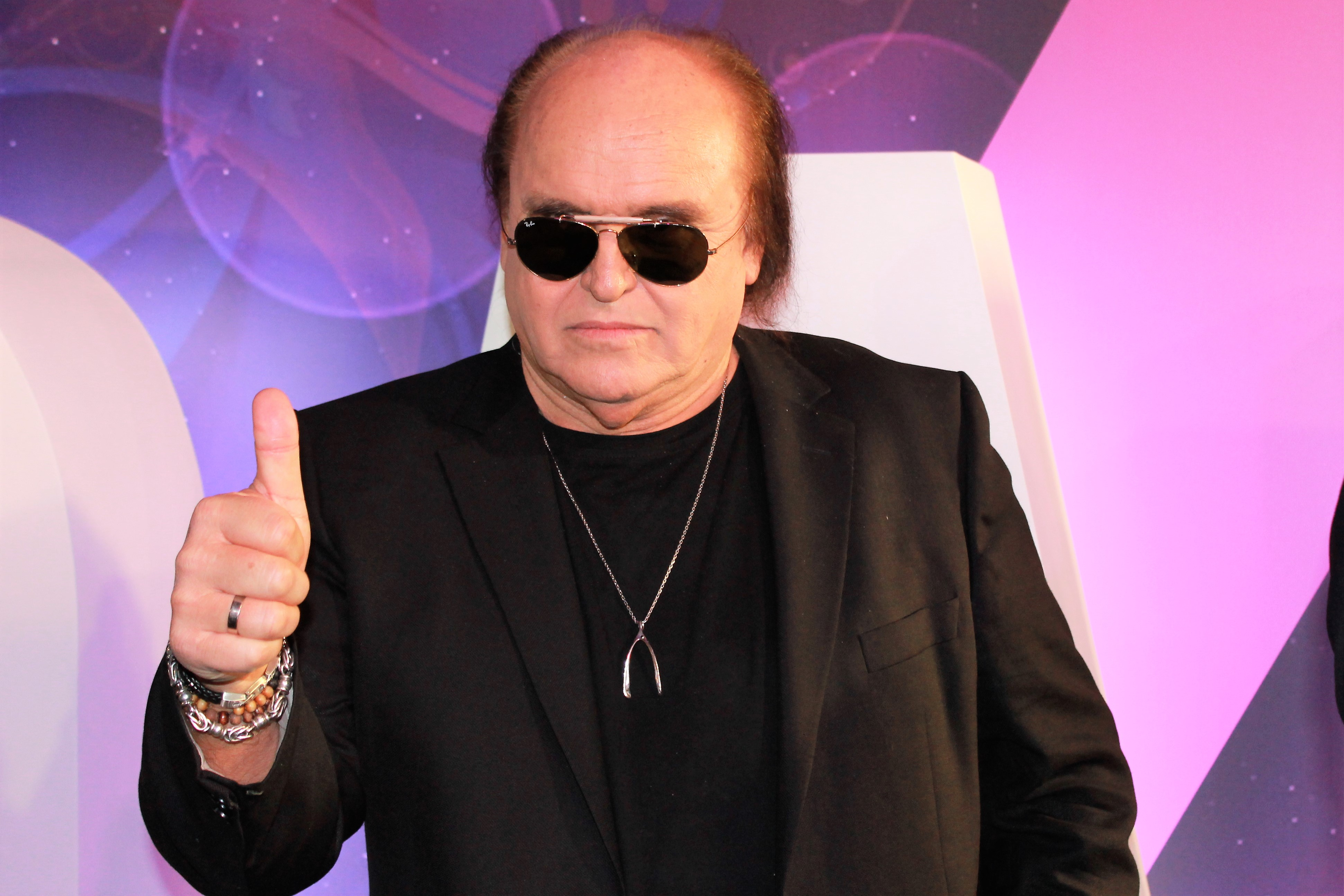
Károly Frenreisz

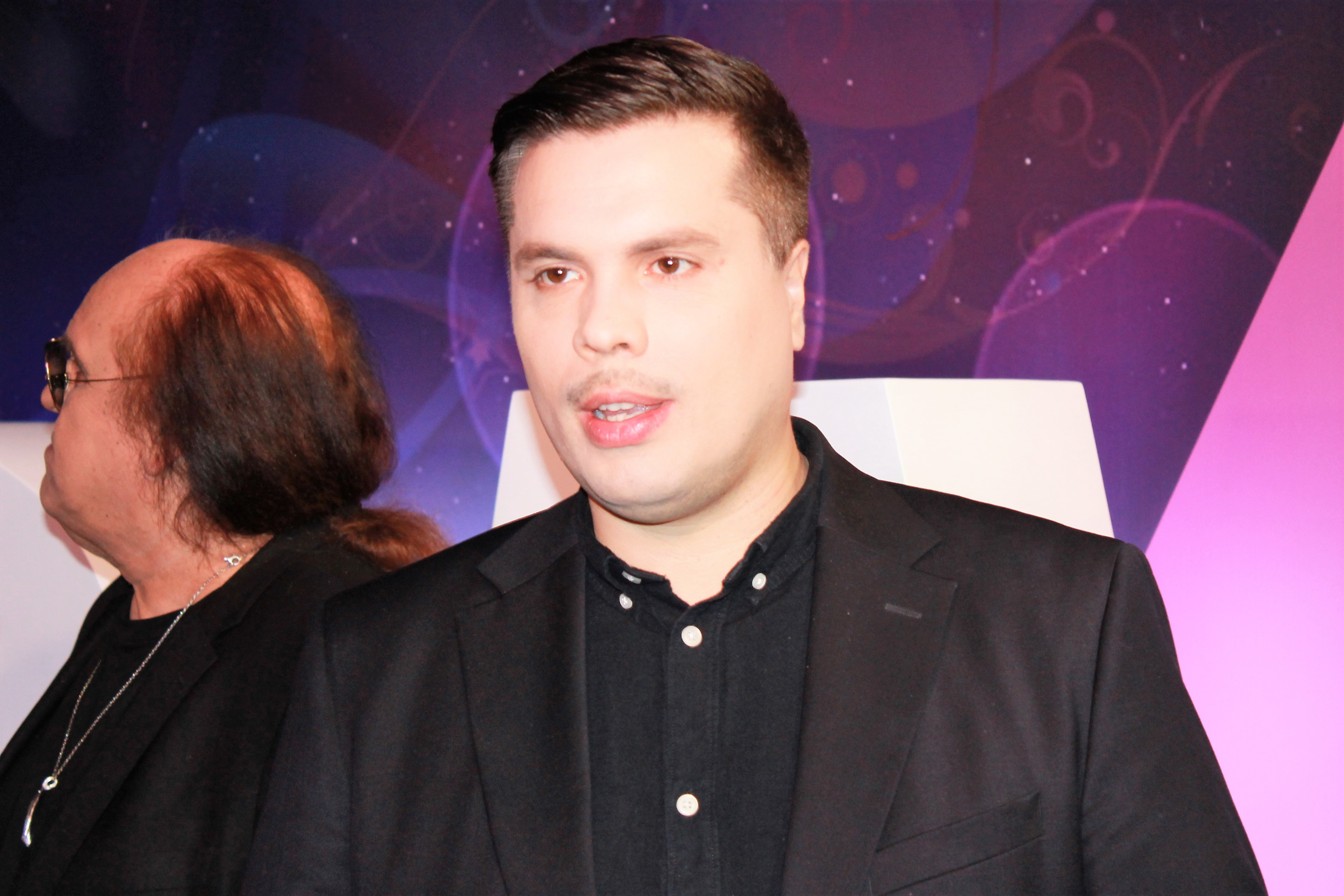
Miklós Both

==== Competing entries ====
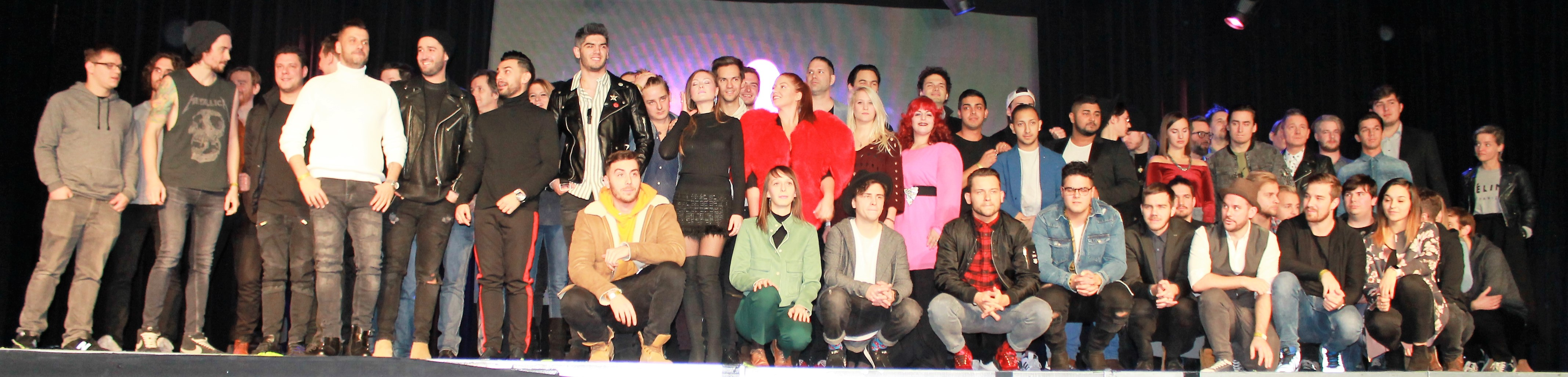
The top 30 entries of A Dal 2018

On 10 October 2017, MTVA opened the submission period for artists and composers to submit their entries up until 20 November 2017.

Among the qualifiers, there are some artists and bands who made their comeback to A Dal-stage. Ceasefire X and Péter Szikszai (male part of Maya ‘n’ Peti) competed in 2016 as part of the boyband ByTheWay. Viki Eszes is in the running now with #yeahla, and took part in the past two times: in 2013 with the band Background, and in 2017 as part of The Couple. The Fourtissimo participated in A Dal once before; in 2015 they performed Run to You along Gyula Éliás. Gábor Heincz Biga and Viktor Király are no similar names in the national selection as well, they were part of the first ever A Dal-superfinal in 2012; the former with his song Learning to Let Go, and the latter with his siblings, performed Untried. Then in 2014 Viktor went on as a solo artist with Running Out of Time. Gabi Knoll took part in the 2014 national selection with her song Sweet Memories, but did not advance to the next round. Attila Kökény was the very first entrant of A Dal in 2012 with Tamara Bencsik. The lead singer of the band Leander Kills took part in the show before at two occasions: in 2015 with his former band called Leander Rising, and in 2017 with the existing formation, with the song called Élet. Maszkura és a tücsökraj competed in A Dal 2016, and gained the worst ever public score in the heats, scoring only 4 out of the maximum 10. This has since been given twice more in 2018, in the second semifinal for the entries sung by Cintia Horváth & Tomi Balogh and Nikoletta Szőke, Attila Kökény and Róbert Szakcsi Lakatos. The Noémo's lead singer, Noémi Takácsová "BülBüls" sang Minden mosoly in 2014, while Odett was a wildcard entry in the 2013 edition of the contest. Then A Dal 2016 started with her English language song Stardust, but did not advance to the next stage. Benjámin Pál (lead singer of Living Room) and the Peet Project were two of the qualifiers a year before with their entries Father's Eyes and Kill Your Monster.

Ádám Szabó was in the race in several occasions before: after a quick elimination in 2013, he came back in 2015, and placed second in the grand final with Give Me Your Love. In 2017 he sang the song Together, and this time he is back with his electro-rock formation called yesyes. The Matter (under the name Mushu) was a finalist in 2016 with Uncle Tom, and would've take part in the 2018 selection as well, but withdrew due to family issues. The band Patikadomb replaced them with Jó szelet!. Reni Tolvai made her first appearance in A Dal in 2012, and stayed at the first stage of the show with Élek a szemeidben. Later she came back in 2016, and advanced to the semi-finals. Tamás Vastag marked his third presence in the national selection, as he took part in A Dal 2013 with Holnaptól, and a year later with Állj meg villág.

Disqualified/Withdrawn song
Replaced song

Artist	Song	Songwriter(s)
Andy Roll	"Turn the Lights On"	András Dutka
AWS	"Viszlát nyár"	Dániel Kökényes, Bence Brucker, Áron Veress, Soma Schiszler, Örs Siklósi
Ceasefire X	"Satellites"	Bence András Vavra, Norbert Szűcs, Kata Kozma
Gergely Dánielfy	"Azt mondtad"	Gergely Dánielfy, Árpád Völgyesi
Fourtissimo	"Kisnyuszi a kalapban"	Valéria Ferencz-Kuna, Márton Kuna, Gyula Ferencz-Kuna, Bence Kuna
Roland Gulyás	"Hypnotized"	ByeAlex
Ham ko Ham	"Bármerre jársz"	G. Zoltán Tóth, Zsolt Kathy
Gábor Heincz Biga	"Good vibez"	Gábor Heincz, Adrián Méhes
Cintia Horváth and Tomi Balogh	"Journey (Break Your Chains)"	Tamás Balogh, Cintia Horváth
Tamás Horváth	"Meggyfa"	Tamás Horváth
Viktor Király	"Budapest Girl"	Viktor Király, Ashley Hicklin, Marcel Závodi, Tamás Kiraly
Gabi Knoll	"Nobody to Die For"	Gabi Knoll, Krisztián Burai, Stanislav Bendarzsevszkij
Leander Kills	"Nem szól harang"	Leander Köteles
Living Room	"Kirakat élet"	Benjamin Pál, Patrik Prommer
Maszkura és a tücsökraj	"Nagybetűs szavak"	Szabolcs Biró, Gábor Boros, Attila Földesi, Csaba Kertész, Dániel Vikukel
~~The Matter~~	~~"Broken Palms"~~	~~Izsák Palmer, Örs Kozák, Joel David Perez García, Kert Antal~~
Maya 'n' Peti	"Nekem te"	Edvárd Szalma, Péter Szikszai
~~Nemzenekar~~	~~"Waiting"~~	~~Gyula Pásztor, Tamás Károly, Gyula Pásztor~~
Nene	"Mese a királyról"	Milán Erik Vörös, Renáta Katalin Orsovai, József Márkosi, Evelin Boda, Szabolcs Balázs Varga, Péter Ferencz
Noémo	"Levegőt!"	Noémi Takácsová, Dániel Ferenc Szabó, Bálint Artúr Szeifert, István Tóth, Márton Jeszenszky
Nova Prospect	"Vigyázó"	József Kiss, Bálint Schautek
Odett	"Aranyhal"	Miklós Toldi, Odett Polgár, Szabolcs Hujber
Patikadomb	"Jó szelet!"	Gábor Dobos, Tamás Kátai, Gyula Ujvári
Peet Project	"Runaround"	Péter Ferencz, Olivér Magán, Attila Závodi, Martin Gudics, Marcell Gudics
SativuS	"Lusta lány"	Márton Szabó, Gábor Pájer
Viki Singh	"Butterfly House"	John King, Andy Vitolo
Zsolt Süle	"Zöld a május"	Zsolt Süle, Péter Bodnár
Nikoletta Szőke, Attila Kökény and Róbert Szakcsi Lakatos	"Életre kel"	Róbert Szakcsi Lakatos, Péter Müller "Sziámi"
Reni Tolvai	"Crack My Code"	Máté Bella, Johnny K. Palmer
Tamás Vastag	"Ne hagyj reményt"	Krisztián Sztevanovity, Dusán Sztevanovity
#yeahla feat. Viki Eszes	"1 szó mint 100"	Péter Jelasity
yesyes	"I Let You Run Away"	Ádám Szabó, Dániel Somogyvári, Flóra Petneházy

==== Shows ====
===== Heats =====
Three heats took place on 20 January, 27 January and 3 February 2018. In each heat ten entries competed and six entries qualified to the semi-finals after two rounds of voting. In the first round of voting, five qualifiers were determined by the combination of scores from each judge and an aggregate score from a public SMS and mobile app vote. In the second round of voting, the remaining five entries that were not in the initial top five faced a public vote consisting of votes submitted through SMS in order to determine one additional qualifier.

In addition to the competing entries, other performers featured during the shows. János Kóbor and Balkan Fanatik performed as the interval act in heat 1, James Karácsony and Margaret Island performed in heat 2, and Fecó Balázs and Veca Janicsák performed in heat 3.

Jury and public voting qualifier Public voting qualifier

Heat 1 – 20 January 2018
R/O	Artist	Song	J. Schell	M. Mező	K. Frenreisz	M. Both	Viewers	Total	Result
1	Living Room	"Kirakat élet"	7	7	8	7	7	36	—N/a
2	Tamás Vastag	"Ne hagyj reményt"	7	7	7	7	8	36	Advanced
3	Noémo	"Levegőt!"	9	8	7	8	7	39	—N/a
4	Leander Kills	"Nem szól harang"	9	9	9	9	8	44	Advanced
5	Zsolt Süle	"Zöld a május"	10	10	8	9	7	44	Advanced
6	Gabi Knoll	"Nobody to Die For"	9	9	8	8	6	40	Advanced
7	Fourtissimo	"Kisnyuszi a kalapban"	6	6	7	6	8	33	—N/a
8	Ceasefire X	"Satellites"	9	8	8	8	8	41	Advanced
9	Viktor Király	"Budapest Girl"	9	8	9	8	9	43	Advanced
10	Patikadomb	"Jó szelet!"	7	6	7	6	7	33	—N/a

Heat 2 – 27 January 2018
R/O	Artist	Song	J. Schell	M. Mező	K. Frenreisz	M. Both	Viewers	Total	Result
1	Peet Project	"Runaround"	7	7	8	7	7	36	—N/a
2	Odett	"Aranyhal"	8	9	8	8	6	39	Advanced
3	yesyes	"I Let You Run Away"	10	8	8	8	9	43	Advanced
4	Maya 'n' Peti	"Nekem te"	6	6	6	6	6	30	—N/a
5	Viki Singh	"Butterfly House"	7	7	7	7	6	34	—N/a
6	SativuS	"Lusta lány"	6	7	7	6	8	34	Advanced
7	Gergely Dánielfy	"Azt mondtad"	10	10	8	9	8	45	Advanced
8	Nene	"Mese a királyról"	7	8	8	8	6	37	—N/a
9	Gábor Heincz Biga	"Good Vibez"	9	9	9	8	8	43	Advanced
10	AWS	"Viszlát nyár"	9	9	9	9	9	45	Advanced

Heat 3 – 3 February 2018
R/O	Artist	Song	J. Schell	M. Mező	K. Frenreisz	M. Both	Viewers	Total	Result
1	Nova Prospect	"Vigyázó"	7	7	8	7	8	37	—N/a
2	Cintia Horváth and Tomi Balogh	"Journey (Break Your Chains)"	8	8	7	8	6	37	Advanced
3	Maszkura és a tücsökraj	"Nagybetűs szavak"	8	8	8	8	6	38	Advanced
4	Roland Gulyás	"Hypnotized"	7	7	7	6	8	35	Advanced
5	Reni Tolvai	"Crack My Code"	8	7	8	7	7	37	—N/a
6	Ham ko Ham	"Bármerre jársz"	7	8	7	8	8	38	Advanced
7	#yeahla feat. Viki Eszes	"1 szó mint 100"	6	7	7	8	7	35	—N/a
8	Andy Roll	"Turn the Lights On"	7	6	7	6	7	33	—N/a
9	Tamás Horváth	"Meggyfa"	9	8	8	8	9	42	Advanced
10	Nikoletta Szőke, Attila Kökény and Róbert Szakcsi Lakatos	"Életre kel"	10	9	9	9	7	44	Advanced

===== Semi-finals =====
Two semi-finals took place on 10 and 17 February 2018. In each semi-final nine entries competed and four entries qualified to the final after two rounds of voting. In the first round of voting, three qualifiers were determined by the combination of scores from each judge and an aggregate score from a public SMS and mobile app vote. In the second round of voting, the remaining six entries that were not in the initial top three faced a public vote consisting of votes submitted through SMS in order to determine one additional qualifier.

In addition to the competing entries, other performers featured during the shows. Kimnowak and János Kardos-Horváth performed as the interval act in semi-final 1, and Adrien Szekeres and Charlie Horváth performed as the interval act for the show.

Jury and public voting qualifier Public voting qualifier

Semi-final 1 – 10 February 2018
R/O	Artist	Song	J. Schell	M. Mező	K. Frenreisz	M. Both	Viewers	Total	Result
1	Ham ko Ham	"Bármerre jársz"	7	8	7	8	6	36	—N/a
2	Gábor Heincz Biga	"Good Vibez"	9	9	9	8	7	42	Advanced
3	SativuS	"Lusta lány"	6	7	8	7	5	33	—N/a
4	Gabi Knoll	"Nobody to Die For"	9	8	7	8	5	37	—N/a
5	Maszkura és a tücsökraj	"Nagybetűs szavak"	8	8	8	8	5	37	—N/a
6	Zsolt Süle	"Zöld a május"	10	10	9	10	6	45	Advanced
7	Roland Gulyás	"Hypnotized"	7	7	8	6	7	35	—N/a
8	Gergely Dánielfy	"Azt mondtad"	10	10	9	10	8	47	Advanced
9	Leander Kills	"Nem szól harang"	8	8	8	9	8	41	Advanced

Semi-final 2 – 17 February 2018
R/O	Artist	Song	J. Schell	M. Mező	K. Frenreisz	M. Both	Viewers	Total	Result
1	Cintia Horváth and Tomi Balogh	"Journey (Break Your Chains)"	8	8	8	8	4	36	—N/a
2	AWS	"Viszlát nyár"	10	10	9	10	7	46	Advanced
3	Odett	"Aranyhal"	8	8	8	8	5	37	—N/a
4	Viktor Király	"Budapest Girl"	9	8	10	8	7	42	Advanced
5	Nikoletta Szőke, Attila Kökény and Róbert Szakcsi Lakatos	"Életre kel"	9	8	8	8	4	37	—N/a
6	Tamás Horváth	"Meggyfa"	8	7	7	8	8	38	Advanced
7	Tamás Vastag	"Ne hagyj reményt"	8	7	8	7	6	36	—N/a
8	Ceasefire X	"Satellites"	9	9	8	8	6	40	—N/a
9	yesyes	"I Let You Run Away"	10	9	9	9	8	45	Advanced

===== Final =====
The final took place on 24 February 2018 where the eight entries that qualified from the semi-finals competed. The winner of the competition was selected over two rounds of voting. In the first round, the jury determined the top four entries that would advance to the second round. The voting system for the four jurors was different from the method used in the heats and semi-finals. Each juror announced their scores after all songs had been performed rather than assigning scores following each performance and the jurors ranked their preferred top four entries and assign points in the following manner: 4 (lowest), 6, 8 and 10 (highest). The four entries with the highest total scores proceeded to the second round. In the second round, "Viszlát nyár" performed by AWS was selected as the winner via a public vote consisting of votes submitted through SMS, mobile app and online voting. In addition to the performances of the competing entries, guest performers included Joci Pápai, the winner of A Dal 2017 and representative of Hungary in the Eurovision Song Contest 2017, as well as one of the judges, Misi Mező and his band Magna Cum Laude, and György Ferenczi.

Advanced to the second round Winner

Final – First Round – 24 February 2018
R/O	Artist	Song	J. Schell	M. Mező	K. Frenreisz	M. Both	Total	Place
1	Leander Kills	"Nem szól harang"	0	0	6	0	6	5
2	yesyes	"I Let You Run Away"	10	6	4	8	28	3
3	Zsolt Süle	"Zöld a május"	0	0	0	0	0	7
4	Tamás Horváth	"Meggyfa"	0	0	0	0	0	7
5	Gábor Heincz Biga	"Good Vibez"	0	0	0	4	4	6
6	Gergely Dánielfy	"Azt mondtad"	8	10	8	10	36	1
7	AWS	"Viszlát nyár"	4	4	0	0	8	4
8	Viktor Király	"Budapest Girl"	6	8	10	6	30	2

Final – Second Round – 24 February 2018
Artist	Song	Percentage	Place
AWS	"Viszlát nyár"	32%	1
Gergely Dánielfy	"Azt mondtad"	—	—N/a
Viktor Király	"Budapest Girl"	—	—N/a
yesyes	"I Let You Run Away"	29%	2

== At Eurovision ==
According to Eurovision rules, all nations with the exceptions of the host country and the "Big Five" (France, Germany, Italy, Spain and the United Kingdom) are required to qualify from one of two semi-finals in order to compete for the final; the top ten countries from each semi-final progress to the final. The European Broadcasting Union (EBU) split up the competing countries into six different pots based on voting patterns from previous contests, with countries with favourable voting histories put into the same pot. On 29 January 2018, a special allocation draw was held which placed each country into one of the two semi-finals, as well as which half of the show they would perform in. Hungary was placed into the second semi-final, to be held on 10 May 2018, and was scheduled to perform in the second half of the show.

Once all the competing songs for the 2018 contest had been released, the running order for the semi-finals was decided by the shows' producers rather than through another draw, so that similar songs were not placed next to each other. Hungary was set to perform in position 13, following the entry from Malta and preceding the entry from Latvia.

=== Voting ===
Voting during the three shows involved each country awarding two sets of points from 1-8, 10 and 12: one from their professional jury and the other from televoting. Each nation's jury consisted of five music industry professionals who are citizens of the country they represent, with their names published before the contest to ensure transparency. This jury judged each entry based on: vocal capacity; the stage performance; the song's composition and originality; and the overall impression by the act. In addition, no member of a national jury was permitted to be related in any way to any of the competing acts in such a way that they cannot vote impartially and independently. The individual rankings of each jury member as well as the nation's televoting results were released shortly after the grand final.

Below is a breakdown of points awarded to Hungary and awarded by Hungary in the second semi-final and grand final of the contest, and the breakdown of the jury voting and televoting conducted during the two shows:

==== Points awarded to Hungary ====
Points awarded to Hungary (Semi-final 2)
Score	Televote	Jury
12 points	Serbia	
10 points	Poland; Romania	
8 points	Germany; Netherlands; San Marino	
7 points		
6 points	Italy	Poland
5 points	Slovenia	Russia
4 points	Georgia; Russia	Australia
3 points	Australia; Latvia	Romania; Slovenia
2 points	Norway; Ukraine	Georgia
1 point	Moldova; Montenegro; Sweden	

Points awarded to Hungary (Final)
Score	Televote	Jury
12 points	Serbia	
10 points	Romania	
8 points	Finland	Azerbaijan
7 points	Poland	
6 points		Greece
5 points	Bulgaria	
4 points		Cyprus
3 points	Austria; Estonia; Montenegro; Slovenia	Israel; Poland
2 points	Belarus; Germany; Italy; Moldova; Netherlands	Czech Republic; Lithuania
1 point	Ukraine	

==== Points awarded by Hungary ====
Points awarded by Hungary (Semi-final 2)
Score	Televote	Jury
12 points	Denmark	Romania
10 points	Moldova	Australia
8 points	Norway	Netherlands
7 points	Poland	Norway
6 points	Ukraine	Serbia
5 points	Slovenia	Denmark
4 points	Netherlands	Poland
3 points	Australia	Sweden
2 points	Serbia	Latvia
1 point	Sweden	Georgia

Points awarded by Hungary (Final)
Score	Televote	Jury
12 points	Denmark	Denmark
10 points	Israel	Albania
8 points	Czech Republic	Austria
7 points	Cyprus	Australia
6 points	Italy	Israel
5 points	Norway	Lithuania
4 points	Netherlands	Netherlands
3 points	Austria	Ireland
2 points	Moldova	Norway
1 point	Germany	Sweden

==== Detailed voting results ====
The following members comprised the Hungarian jury:

- Janós Karácsony (James; jury chairperson) – composer, guitarist, singer
- Balázs Bolyki – gospel singer, musician, composer, producer, lyricist, vocal coach
- Alexandra Pintácsi (Szandi) – singer
- Lilla Vincze – singer
- Zoltán "Zé" Szabó – composer, producer

Detailed voting results from Hungary (Semi-final 2)
R/O	Country	Jury							Televote	
R/O	Country	James	B. Bolyki	Szandi	L. Vincze	Z. Szabó	Rank	Points	Rank	Points
01	Norway	4	3	2	14	5	4	7	3	8
02	Romania	2	4	1	3	1	1	12	14	
03	Serbia	12	11	7	5	2	5	6	9	2
04	San Marino	10	17	15	9	10	14		17	
05	Denmark	13	9	10	2	8	6	5	1	12
06	Russia	14	16	14	13	13	17		12	
07	Moldova	16	12	8	12	14	15		2	10
08	Netherlands	1	2	3	4	6	3	8	7	4
09	Australia	3	1	4	1	7	2	10	8	3
10	Georgia	6	14	9	6	12	10	1	15	
11	Poland	5	15	11	17	3	7	4	4	7
12	Malta	15	13	6	7	15	12		13	
13	Hungary									
14	Latvia	7	5	13	8	16	9	2	11	
15	Sweden	8	6	12	16	4	8	3	10	1
16	Montenegro	9	10	16	15	17	16		16	
17	Slovenia	17	7	17	10	9	13		6	5
18	Ukraine	11	8	5	11	11	11		5	6

Detailed voting results from Hungary (Final)
R/O	Country	Jury							Televote	
R/O	Country	James	B. Bolyki	Szandi	L. Vincze	Z. Szabó	Rank	Points	Rank	Points
01	Ukraine	20	20	7	19	16	17		11	
02	Spain	19	7	22	14	18	16		24	
03	Slovenia	16	14	21	21	19	22		18	
04	Lithuania	10	10	12	9	4	6	5	17	
05	Austria	5	4	2	8	1	3	8	8	3
06	Estonia	8	9	17	11	13	15		13	
07	Norway	12	11	4	23	8	9	2	6	5
08	Portugal	24	23	25	7	20	18		25	
09	United Kingdom	18	16	19	10	24	20		23	
10	Serbia	25	21	10	17	21	21		16	
11	Germany	11	5	15	12	14	14		10	1
12	Albania	3	2	1	3	9	2	10	19	
13	France	23	17	24	15	23	24		22	
14	Czech Republic	21	25	16	25	15	23		3	8
15	Denmark	1	1	3	1	2	1	12	1	12
16	Australia	7	3	5	2	6	4	7	20	
17	Finland	9	24	18	13	25	19		14	
18	Bulgaria	22	12	11	16	3	12		12	
19	Moldova	2	22	20	24	17	13		9	2
20	Sweden	13	8	9	20	5	10	1	21	
21	Hungary									
22	Israel	14	13	6	6	7	5	6	2	10
23	Netherlands	17	6	13	4	12	7	4	7	4
24	Ireland	6	15	14	5	10	8	3	15	
25	Cyprus	4	18	8	18	11	11		4	7
26	Italy	15	19	23	22	22	25		5	6
