= X-Faktor series 6 =

X-Faktor
- Series 6
- Hosted by: Bence Istenes
- Judges: Laci Gáspár; Gabi Tóth; Peti Puskás; ByeAlex
- Winner: Barbara Opitz
- Winning mentor: Gabi Tóth
- Runner-up: Ricsi Mata

Release
- Original network: RTL Klub
- Original release: 24 September – 17 December 2016

Series chronology
- ← Previous; Series 5 Next → Series 7

X-Faktor is a Hungarian television music competition to find new singing talent. The sixth series aired on RTL Klub in 2016. Bence Istenes presented his third series of X-Faktor. Gabi Tóth returned as a judge for the third time. Laci Gáspár, Peti Puskás and ByeAlex, joined her, who replaced judges Róbert Alföldi, Róbert Szikora and Gábor Szűcs (Little G. Weewil).

The series also saw the age limit decreased from 14 to 12.

== Judges' houses ==
At this stage of the competition each judge mentored six acts. 24 acts went through for this stage of the show. Each judge had help from a guest judge to choose their final acts.

The twelve eliminated acts were:

- Boys: József Berki, Kristóf Petics, Máté Türk
- Girls: Cintia Laszló, Stephanie Semeniuc, Fanni Sorbán
- Over 25s: Laszlo Brantner, Nikoletta Colette Horváth, Anita Anissza Sárosi
- Groups: Atomic Playboyz, Dynamite Dudes, The Wedding at the Slaughterhouse

== Contestants ==
Key:

– Winner
– Runner-Up
– Third place

Category (mentor)	Acts		
Boys (Puskás)	Gergő Dánielfy	Dmitrij Gorbunov	Ricsi Mata
Girls (Tóth)	Kinga Jáger	Barbara Opitz	Liza Vince Aliz
Over 25s (Gáspár)	Eszter Balogh	Szandra Fejes	János Ónodi
Groups (ByeAlex)	Ham ko Ham	Jaggers	Soulbreakers

Kristóf Petics had originally been chosen for the live shows, but was disqualified from the competition due to him performing fighting and problematic behavior. He was replaced by Ricsi Mata.

== Results summary ==
– mentored by Gabi Tóth (Girls)	– Bottom two/three
– mentored by Peti Puskás (Boys)	– Safe
– mentored by ByeAlex (Groups)	– Eliminated by SMS vote
– mentored by Laci Gáspár (Over 25s)

Contestant	Week 1	Week 2	Week 3	Week 4	Week 5	Week 6	Final Week 7	
Contestant	Week 1	Week 2	Week 3	Week 4	Week 5	Week 6	Round 1	Round 2
Barbara Opitz	6th	2nd	1st	3rd	1st	2nd	2nd	Winner; 57,36%
Ricsi Mata	1st	1st	2nd	1st	2nd	1st	1st	Runner-up; 42,64%
Dmitrij Gorbunov	3rd	3rd	3rd	4th	4th	3rd	3rd	Eliminated (Week 7)
Ham ko Ham	2nd	5th	4th	2nd	3rd	4th	Eliminated (Week 6)	
Szandra Fejes	11th	6th	6th	5th	5th	Eliminated (Week 5)		
Liza Vince Aliz	4th	8th	5th	6th	Eliminated (Week 4)			
János Ónodi	8th	7th	7th	Eliminated (Week 3)				
Kinga Jáger	5th	4th	8th	Eliminated (Week 3)				
Gergő Dánielfy	7th	9th	Eliminated (Week 2)					
Soulbreakers	9th	10th	Eliminated (Week 2)					
Jaggers	10th	Eliminated (Week 1)						
Eszter Balogh	12th	Eliminated (Week 1)						
Final Showdown	Jaggers, Szandra Fejes	Gergő Dánielfy, Líza Vince Alíz	Szandra Fejes, János Ónodi	Szandra Fejes, Liza Vince Alíz	Szandra Fejes, Dmitrij Gorbunov	Ham ko Ham, Dmitrij Gorbunov	No judges' vote or final showdown: public votes alone decide who is eliminated and who ultimately wins	
Gáspár's vote to eliminate	Jaggers	Gergő Dánielfy	János Ónodi	Liza Vince Alíz	Dmitrij Gorbunov	Dmitrij Gorbunov	No judges' vote or final showdown: public votes alone decide who is eliminated and who ultimately wins	
Puskás's vote to eliminate	Jaggers	Liza Vince Aliz	János Ónodi	Liza Vince Alíz	Szandra Fejes	Ham ko Ham	No judges' vote or final showdown: public votes alone decide who is eliminated and who ultimately wins	
Tóth's vote to eliminate	Jaggers	Gergő Dánielfy	János Ónodi	Szandra Fejes	Szandra Fejes	Ham ko Ham	No judges' vote or final showdown: public votes alone decide who is eliminated and who ultimately wins	
ByeAlex's vote to eliminate	Szandra Fejes	Gergő Dánielfy	Szandra Fejes	Szandra Fejes	Szandra Fejes	Dmitrij Gorbunov	No judges' vote or final showdown: public votes alone decide who is eliminated and who ultimately wins	
Eliminated	Jaggers; 3 from 4 votes Majority	Gergő Dánielfy; 3 from 4 votes Majority	János Ónodi; 3 from 4 votes Majority	Liza Vince Alíz; 2 from 4 votes Deadblock	Szandra Fejes; 3 from 4 votes Majority	Ham ko Ham; 2 from 4 votes Deadblock	Dmitrij Gorbunov; 3rd Place	Risci Mata; 2nd place
Eliminated	Eszter Balogh; SMS vote	Soulbreakers; SMS vote	Kinga Jáger; SMS vote	Liza Vince Alíz; 2 from 4 votes Deadblock	Szandra Fejes; 3 from 4 votes Majority	Ham ko Ham; 2 from 4 votes Deadblock	Dmitrij Gorbunov; 3rd Place	Barbara Optiz; 1st Place

== Live Shows ==
=== Week 1 (5 November) ===
- Theme: Songs that describe the contestants
- Celebrity performer: Spoon 21 & Dirty LED Light Crew ("Deák")
- Group performance: "Minden a miénk"

A summary of the contestants' performances on the first live show and results show, along with the results.
Act	Order	Song	Result
Soulbreakers	1	"Are You Gonna Go My Way"	Safe
Kinga Jáger	2	"Hagylak menni"	Safe
János Ónodi	3	"I Won't Give Up"	Safe
Ricsi Mata	4	"Lélekdonor"	Safe
Barbara Opitz	5	"Cry Baby"	Safe
Eszter Balogh	6	"I Wish"	Eliminated
Dmitrij Gorbunov	7	"True Colors"	Safe
Ham ko Ham	8	"Ott várok rád"	Safe
Liza Vince Aliz	9	"Nekem senkim sincsen"	Safe
Szandra Fejes	10	"Dream On"	Bottom three
Gergő Dánielfy	11	"Say Something"	Safe
Jaggers	12	"Sex on Fire"	Bottom three
Final showdown details
Jaggers	1	"You Could Be Mine"	Eliminated
Szandra Fejes	2	"Too Much Love Will Kill You"	Safe

Judge's vote to eliminate

- Gáspár: Jaggers
- ByeAlex: Szandra Fejes
- Puskás: Jaggers
- Tóth: Jaggers

=== Week 2 (12 November) ===
- Theme: Love songs
- Celebrity performer: Margaret Island ("Sárga levelek")
- Group performance: "Sugar"

A summary of the contestants' performances on the second live show and results show, along with the results.
Act	Order	Song	Result
Gergő Dánielfy	1	"Fever"/"Hit the Road Jack"	Bottom three
Liza Vince Aliz	2	"Across the Universe"	Bottom three
Ham ko Ham	3	"Mikor"	Safe
János Ónodi	4	"Stitches"	Safe
Kinga Jáger	5	"Rise Like a Phoenix"	Safe
Szandra Fejes	6	"Hush Hush"	Safe
Dmitrij Gorbunov	7	"Shine"	Safe
Soulbreakers	8	"Bad"	Eliminated
Ricsi Mata	9	"As Long as You Love Me"	Safe
Barbara Opitz	10	"Utánam a vízözön"	Safe
Final showdown details
Gergő Dánielfy	1	"Give In to Me"	Eliminated
Liza Vince Aliz	2	"The Sound of Silence"	Safe

Judge's vote to eliminate

- Puskás: Liza Vince Aliz
- Tóth: Gergő Dánielfy
- Gáspár: Gergő Dánielfy
- ByeAlex: Gergő Dánielfy

=== Week 3 (19 November) ===
- Theme: When Calling the City
- Celebrity performer: The KOLIN ("Soda & Lime")
- Group performance: "Can't Stop the Feeling!"

A summary of the contestants' performances on the third live show and results show, along with the results.
Act	Order	Song	Result
Ricsi Mata	1	"King"	Safe
Liza Vince Aliz	2	"Reckoning Song"	Safe
Szandra Fejes	3	"A város másik oldalán"	Bottom three
Ham Ko Ham	4	"Apuveddmeg"	Safe
Barbara Opitz	5	"Addicted to You"	Safe
Kinga Jáger	6	"Crazy in Love"	Eliminated
János Ónodi	7	"Some Nights"	Bottom three
Dmitrij Gorbunov	8	"Diamonds"	Safe
Final showdown details
János Ónodi	1	"When We Were Young"	Eliminated
Szandra Fejes	2	"Egyedül blues"	Safe

Judge's vote to eliminate

- Gáspár: János Ónodi
- Puskás: János Ónodi
- Tóth: János Ónodi
- ByeAlex: not required to vote as there was already a majority, but stated that he would have eliminated Szandra Fejes

=== Week 4 (26 November) ===
- Celebrity performer: JETLAG ("Karszalagok")
- Group performance: "Up"

A summary of the contestants' performances on the fourth live show and results show, along with the results.
Act	Order	Song	Result
Dmitrij Gorbunov	1	"Oops!... I Did It Again"	Safe
Barbara Opitz	2	"Találkozás egy régi szerelemmel"	Safe
Szandra Fejes	3	"GoldenEye"	Bottom two
Ricsi Mata	4	"Keresem a lányt"	Safe
Liza Vince Aliz	5	"Tudományos Fantasztikus Pop"	Bottom two
Ham Ko Ham	6	"Hajolj bele a hajamba (Labamba)"	Safe
Duet
Dmitrij Gorbunov & Liza Vince Alíz	1	"Somebody That I Used to Know"	
Ricsi Mata & Ham ko Ham	2	"Valami van a levegőben"	
Barbara Opitz & Szandra Fejes	3	"Paint It Black"	
Final showdown details
Szandra Fejes	1	"Nincs semmi másom"	Safe
Liza Vince Aliz	2	Original song	Eliminated

Judge's vote to eliminate

- Gáspár: Liza Vince Aliz
- Tóth: Szandra Fejes
- Puskás: Liza Vince Aliz
- ByeAlex: Szandra Fejes

With each act receiving two votes, the result was reverted to the earlier public vote. Liza Vince Aliz received the fewest votes and was eliminated.

=== Week 5 (3 December) ===
- Theme: One Hungarian song and one English song

A summary of the contestants' performances on the fifth live show and results show, along with the results.
Act	Order	First song	Order	Second song	Result
Szandra Fejes	1	"Think"	9	"Késő már"	Bottom two
Barbara Optiz	2	"Erdő közepében"	6	"Spectrum (Say My Name)"	Safe
Risci Mata	3	"Can't Feel My Face"	10	"Maradj velem"	Safe
Ham Ko Ham	4	"Gelem, Gelem"	8	"Emanuelle"	Safe
Dmitrij Gorbunov	5	"Uptown Funk"	7	"Várj reám"	Bottom two
Final showdown details
Szandra Fejes	1	"Régi vágy"			Eliminated
Dmitrij Gorbunov	2	"Unstoppable"			Safe

Judge's vote to eliminate

- Gáspár: Dmitrij Gorbunov
- Puskás: Szandra Fejes
- ByeAlex: Szandra Fejes
- Tóth: Szandra Fejes

=== Week 6 (10 December) ===
- Theme: Contestant's choice and Mentor's choice

A summary of the contestants' performances on the sixth live show and results show, along with the results.
Act	Order	First song	Order	Second song	Result
Ham ko Ham	1	"Szerelem"	6	"Szájbergyerek"	Bottom two
Risci Mata	2	"Szállj fel magasra"	5	"Ai Se Eu Te Pego"	Safe
Barbara Optiz	3	"Gondolsz-e majd rám?"	8	"May It Be"	Safe
Dmitrij Gorbunov	4	"Human"	7	"Rule the World"	Bottom two
Final showdown details
Ham ko Ham	1	title of the song not announced			Eliminated
Dmitrij Gorbunov	2	"Another Love"			Safe

Judge's vote to eliminate

- ByeAlex: Dmitrij Gorbunov
- Puskás: Ham ko Ham
- Tóth: Ham ko Ham
- Gáspár: Dmitrij Gorbunov

With each act receiving two votes, the result was reverted to the earlier public vote. Ham ko Ham received the fewest votes and was eliminated.

=== Week 7 Final (17 December) ===
- Theme: mentor's choice, a duet with mentor, contestant's choice, winner's single

A summary of the contestants' performances on the seventh live show and results show, along with the results.
Act	Order	First song	Order	Second song	Order	Third song	Order	Fourth song	Result
Dmitrij Gorbunov	1	"Can't Pretend"	4	"Sorry" (with Peti Puskás)	N/A (Already Eliminated)				3rd Place
Ricsi Mata	2	"Jealous"	6	"Léggömb" (with Peti Puskás)	7	"Dancing On My Own"	9	"Csillanj fel"	Runner-up
Barbara Opitz	3	"Chandelier"	5	"Jöjj még" (with Gabi Tóth)	8	"You Lost Me"	10	"Csillanj fel"	Winner
