= Gergely Dánielfy =

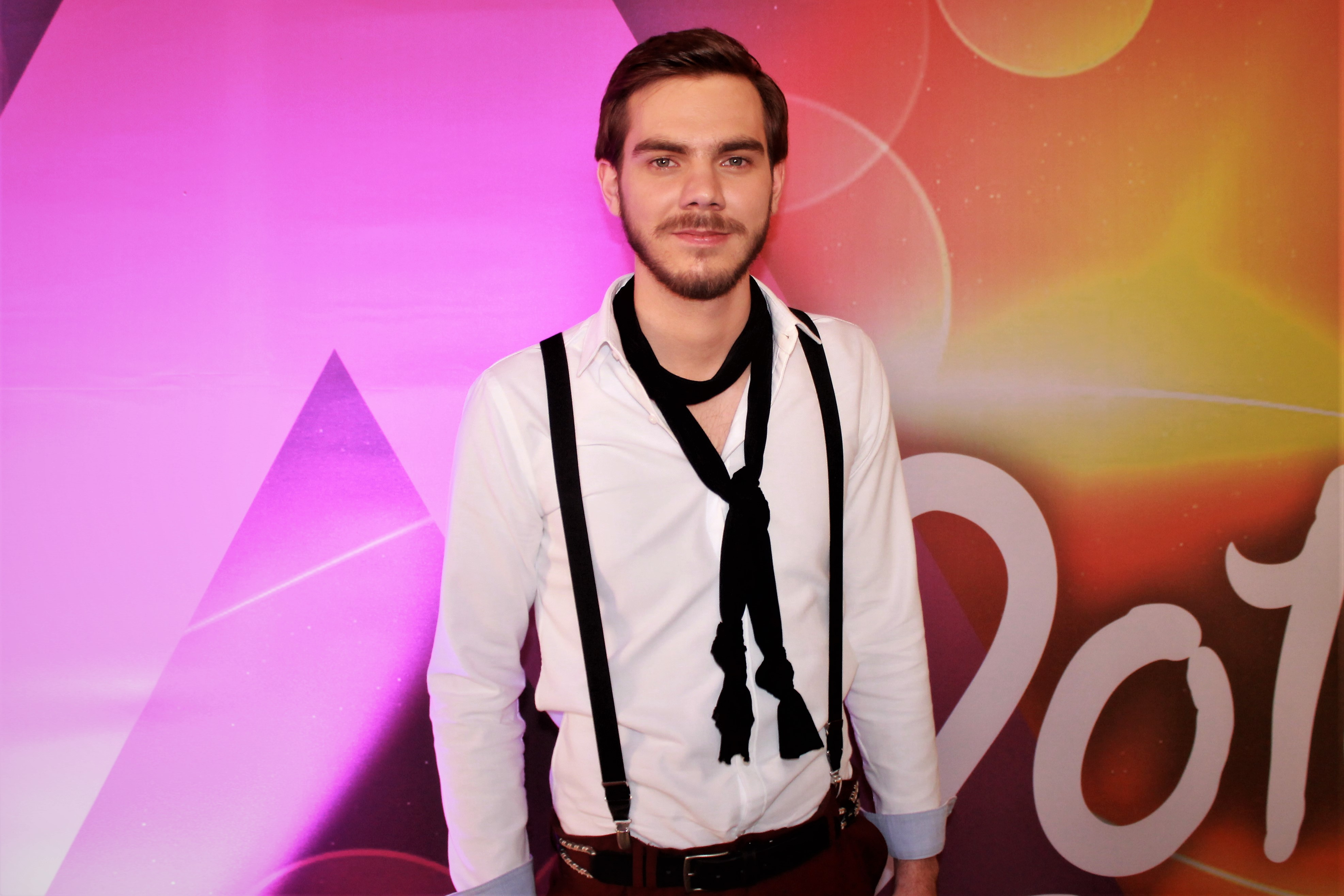
- Dánielfy in 2018

Background information
- Born: 22 June 1997 (age 28); Debrecen, Hungary
- Occupation: Singer
- Instruments: vocals, piano, guitar, saxophone, clarinet
- Years active: 2012 – present

Gergely Dánielfy or Gergő Dánielfy (born 22 June 1997, Debrecen) is a Hungarian singer and performer, most notable for participating in A Dal 2018 and participating in the sixth season of X-Factor.

== Career ==
Dánielfy played basketball in his childhood. When he was eight, he played with the Ziccer Tigers, and was a certified athlete at the Debrecen Sports School.

After completing primary school, he continued his studies at the Ady Endre Gymnasium in Debrecen, where he began to focus more so on art. Finally, he started acting in his fifth grade of grammar school. He debuted on TV2's Megasztár. In addition to singing and basketball, he has learned to play the guitar, piano, saxophone and clarinet.

In 2013, he tried to participate in RTL Klub's X-Faktor, but did not make it to the live show. In 2016, he tried again and made it to the live broadcasts, where he finally finished in ninth place. Since September 2017, he has been a student of the Faculty of Arts of the University of Kaposvár.

On 6 December 2017, it was announced that Dánielfy will compete in A Dal 2018, the Hungarian national selection process for the Eurovision Song Contest 2018 in Lisbon, Portugal with the song Azt mondtad. First, on 27 January 2018, he went on stage in the second heat, where he won a tied first place with AWS and went to the semi-finals. On 10 February 2018, from the first semi-final, he scored 47 points and won the semi-final, and competed in the final of the show. He won the jury vote in the final, but AWS won A Dal through the televoting.

== Awards ==
- A Dal Discovery of the Year (2018)

== Discography ==
=== Singles ===
- Azt mondtad (2018)
