= Maszkura és a tücsökraj =

Hungarian funk band

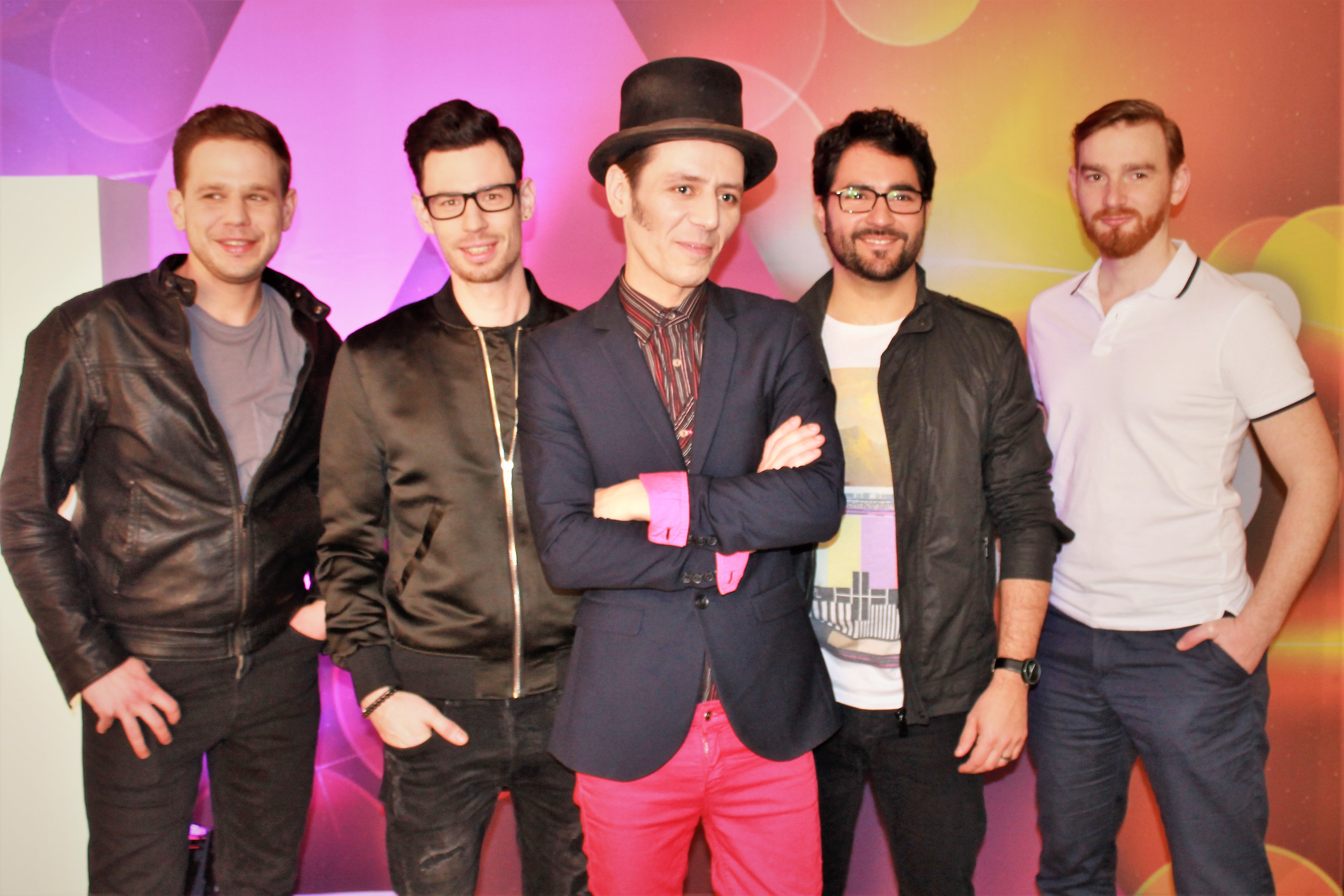
- Maszkura és a tücsökraj in 2018

Background information
- Origin: Hungary
- Genres: Alternative; Soul; Funk; Hip hop
- Years active: 2007–present
- Members: Maszkura; Dániel Borbényi; Zsolt Vörös; Illés Arató

Maszkura és a tücsökraj is a Hungarian funk band formed in 2007.

== Biography ==
Maszkura és a tücsökraj was formed in 2007, perform continuously at multiple clubs and festivals around Hungary. The unique appearance of the Transylvanian-born Maszkura, as well as their experimental fusion of alternative, soul, funk, and hip-hop traditions give the group a distinctive style.

Maszkura és a tücsökraj have so far released six singles and an EP, including Szégyentelen, Kérlek, így szeress!, and Pesti nők. Their most popular recordings (Pesti nők, Tiszta gyümölcs, Lady Maga!, etc.) are constantly present on national and local radio stations and have been featured in several compilations.

Maszkura és a tücsökraj, collaborating with Siska Finuccsi, participated in A Dal 2016, the 2016 edition of the Hungarian national process for the Eurovision Song Contest with the song Kinek sírjam, but were eliminated in the heats. On 6 December 2017, it was announced that they would compete again in the 2018 edition of A Dal, for the Eurovision Song Contest 2018 in Lisbon, Portugal with the song Nagybetűs szavak. They were eliminated in the semi-finals.

== Discography ==
=== Singles ===
Year	Title	Publisher
2009	Szégyentelen	CLS
2010	Kérlek, így szeress!	CLS
2012	Sztárzseni	DDK Records
2013	Lady Maga!	DDK Records
2015	Tedd ki!	Gold Record

=== EPs ===
Year	Title	Publisher
2012	Pesti Nők	CLS
