= Hungary in the Eurovision Song Contest 2012 =

- Eurovision Song Contest 2012
- Country: Hungary
- Selection process: A Dal 2012
- Selection date: 11 February 2012

Competing entry
- Song: "Sound of Our Hearts"
- Artist: Compact Disco
- Songwriters: Behnam Lotfi; Gábor Pál; Attila Sándor; Csaba Walkó

Placement
- Semi-final result: Qualified (10th, 52 points)
- Final result: 24th, 19 points

Participation chronology

Hungary was represented at the Eurovision Song Contest 2012 in Baku, Azerbaijan. The Hungarian entry was selected through A Dal (which means "The Song"), consisting of two semi-finals and a final, organised by the Hungarian broadcaster M1. Compact Disco represented Hungary with the song "Sound of Our Hearts", which qualified from the first semi-final and went on to place 24th in the final, scoring 19 points.

== Before Eurovision ==
=== A Dal 2012 ===
A Dal 2012 was the first edition of A Dal which selected the Hungarian entry for the Eurovision Song Contest 2012. Twenty entries competed in the competition that consisted of three shows which commenced on 28 January 2012 and concluded with an eight-song final on 11 February 2012. All shows in the competition were broadcast on m1 and Duna TV World.

==== Format ====
The format of the competition consisted of three shows: two semi-finals and a final. The three shows took place at MTVA studios in Budapest and were hosted by Zsóka Kapócs and Gábor Gundel-Takács. The semi-finals, held on 28 January and 4 February 2012, each featured ten entries with four advancing to the final from each show. The final, held on 11 February 2012, selected the Hungarian entry for Baku from the eight remaining entries.

==== Voting ====
Results during each show were determined by each member of the four-member judging panel and votes from the public. During the semi-finals, two rounds of voting determined which entries advanced to the final of the competition. In the first round of voting, each judge assigned scores to each entry ranging from 1 (lowest score) to 10 (highest score) immediately after the artist(s) conclude their performance. The summation of the judges scores determined the final scores for the first round. The top three entries with the highest scores advanced to the final in the first round of voting. In the case of a tie among the entries in the first round of voting, the judging panel would deliberate and determine which entries would advance. In the second round of voting, the remaining entries that did not qualify during the first round faced a public vote via submitting an SMS where the single entry that received the most votes from each semi-final would also advance to the final. In the case of a tie during the second round of voting, the entry which received a higher score during the first round of voting would advance and should a tie still persist, the judging panel would deliberate and determine which entry advanced.

In the final, the eight remaining entries also faced two rounds of voting. In the first round, The top four entries determined exclusively by a public vote qualified to the second round of voting. In the second round, the judges exclusively determined the winning entry by assigning one vote to their preferred entry.

==== Judges ====
The judging panel participated in each show by providing feedback to the competing artists and selecting entries to advance in the competition. The panel consisted of:

- Viktor Rakonczai – Composer and member of V.I.P. who represented Hungary in the Eurovision Song Contest 1997
- Kati Wolf – Singer who represented Hungary in 2011 in Düsseldorf with "What About My Dreams?"
- Philip Rákay – Programme director
- Jenő Csiszár – Radio anchor

==== Competing entries ====
Artists and composers were able to submit their applications and entries for the competition between 1 December 2011 and 30 December 2011. Artists were permitted to collaborate with international composers. After the submission deadline had passed, a preselection jury selected twenty entries for the competition. The competing entries were announced during a press conference on 10 January 2012.

Artist	Song	Songwriter(s)
András Kállay-Saunders	"I Love You"	András Kállay-Saunders, Krisztián Szakos, Krisztián Burai
Annamari Dancs	"Feel"	Annamari Dancs
Anti Fitness Club	"Lesz, ami lesz"	Tamás Molnár
Attila Kökény and Tamara Bencsik	"Állítsd meg az időt"	Péter Krajczár, Márk Pacsai, István Tabár, Attila Kökény
Barna Pély and Eszter Pál feat. Szalonna	"Hangok a szívekért"	Barna Pély, Eszter Pál, István Pál
Caramel	"Vízió"	Ferenc Molnár
Compact Disco	"Sound of Our Hearts"	Behnam Lotfi, Gábor Pál, Csaba Walkó, Attila Sándor
Gabi Tóth	"Nem kell végszó"	Zé Szabó, Tamás Molnár
Gábor Heincz	"Learning to Let Go"	Naughty Monkey
Gina Kiss	"Chasing Dreams"	Barnabás Jónás, Gina Kiss
Juli Fábián and Zoohacker	"Like a Child"	Zoltán Palásti Kovács, Julianna Fábián
The Kiralys	"Untried"	Pras Michel, Roy Hamilton, Linda Király
Mónika Veres	"This Love"	Imre Molnár, Chris Landon, Taryn Murphy
Monsoon	"Dance"	Márton Vödrös, Tibor Fábián, György Horváth, Johnny K. Palmer
Niki Gallusz and Márton Vizy	"Európa, egy a szívünk"	Vizy Márton, Kristóf Vigh
Péter Puskás	"Csillagok"	Gábor Molnár, Péter Puskás
Renáta Tolvai	"Élek a szemeidben"	Péter Krajczár, Márk Pacsai, István Tabár, Renáta Tolvai
Rudi Krisz	"A fél veled egész"	Rudi Krisz, Zoltán Hamza
Sophistic	"Yeah, OK!"	Péter Krajczár, Orsolya Juhász, Alexandra Rozman, Kolos Schilling
Tibor Gyurcsík	"Back in Place"	Zé Szabó, Johnny K. Palmer

==== Semi-finals ====
Two semi-finals took place on 28 January and 4 February 2012. In each semi-final ten entries competed and four entries qualified to the final after two round of voting. In the first round of voting, three qualifiers were determined by the combination of scores from each judge. In the second round of voting, the remaining seven entries that were not in the initial top three faced a public vote consisting of votes submitted through SMS in order to determine one additional qualifier.

Jury qualifier Public voting qualifier

Semi-final 1 – 28 January 2012
R/O	Artist	Song	V. Rakonczai	K. Wolf	P. Rákay	J. Csiszár	Jury total	Result
1	Attila Kökény and Tamara Bencsik	"Állítsd meg az időt"	6	6	6	6	24	—N/a
2	András Kállay-Saunders	"I Love You"	8	8	8	8	32	—N/a
3	Barna Pély and Eszter Pál feat. Szalonna	"Hangok a szívekért"	6	7	9	7	29	—N/a
4	Annamari Dancs	"Feel"	4	5	3	3	15	—N/a
5	Gábor Heincz	"Learning to Let Go"	10	9	10	9	38	Advanced
6	Compact Disco	"Sound of Our Hearts"	10	10	10	9	39	Advanced
7	Rudi Krisz	"A fél veled egész"	4	5	5	4	18	—N/a
8	Niki Gallusz and Márton Vizy	"Európa, egy a szívünk"	7	8	10	6	31	—N/a
9	Gabi Tóth	"Nem kell végszó"	9	9	8	8	34	Advanced
10	Caramel	"Vízió"	9	9	10	9	37	Advanced

Semi-final 2 – 4 February 2012
R/O	Artist	Song	V. Rakonczai	K. Wolf	P. Rákay	J. Csiszár	Jury total	Result
1	Monsoon	"Dance"	7	6	7	6	26	—N/a
2	Péter Puskás	"Csillagok"	8	9	9	7	33	—N/a
3	Sophistic	"Yeah, OK!"	5	5	4	4	18	—N/a
4	Juli Fábián and Zoohacker	"Like a Child"	9	9	9	8	35	Advanced
5	Gina Kiss	"Chasing Dreams"	7	7	8	7	29	—N/a
6	Anti Fitness Club	"Lesz, ami lesz"	9	8	9	8	34	—N/a
7	Mónika Veres	"This Love"	10	10	9	9	38	Advanced
8	Tibor Gyurcsík	"Back in Place"	10	10	10	9	39	Advanced
9	Renáta Tolvai	"Élek a szemeidben"	8	7	8	7	30	—N/a
10	The Kiralys	"Untried"	9	8	9	9	35	Advanced

==== Final ====
The final took place on 11 February 2012 where the eight entries that qualified from the semi-finals competed. The winner of the competition was selected over two rounds of voting. In the first round, a public vote consisting of votes submitted through SMS determined the top four entries that advanced to the second round. In the second round, the jury determined "Sound of Our Hearts" performed by Compact Disco as the winner. The voting system for the four jurors was different from the method used in the semi-finals. The jurors assigned one vote for their preferred entry and the entry with the highest total scores was selected as the winner.

Advanced to the second round Winner

Final – First Round – 11 February 2012
R/O	Artist	Song	Result
1	The Kiralys	"Untried"	Advanced
2	Tibor Gyurcsík	"Back in Place"	—N/a
3	Gabi Tóth	"Don't Save Me"	—N/a
4	Compact Disco	"Sound of Our Hearts"	Advanced
5	Juli Fábián and Zoohacker	"Like a Child"	—N/a
6	Caramel	"Vertigo"	Advanced
7	Mónika Veres	"This Love"	—N/a
8	Gábor Heincz	"Learning to Let Go"	Advanced

Final – Second Round – 11 February 2012
Artist	Song	V. Rakonczai	K. Wolf	P. Rákay	J. Csiszár	Total
The Kiralys	"Untried"	0	0	0	0	0
Compact Disco	"Sound of Our Hearts"	0	1	0	1	2
Caramel	"Vertigo"	0	0	1	0	1
Gábor Heincz	"Learning to Let Go"	1	0	0	0	1

== At Eurovision ==
Hungary competed in the second half of the first semi-final on 22 May and qualified to the Grand Final, placing 10th with 52 points. The public awarded Hungary 11th place with 39 points and the jury awarded 7th place with 76 points. In the final Hungary came 24th with 19 points, with the public awarding Hungary 22nd place with 20 points and the jury awarding 23rd place with 30 points.

=== Voting ===
==== Points awarded to Hungary ====
Points awarded to Hungary (Semi-final 1)
Score	Country
12 points	
10 points	
8 points	Romania
7 points	Albania
6 points	Belgium; Switzerland
5 points	Cyprus; Denmark; Moldova
4 points	Austria; Finland
3 points	
2 points	Azerbaijan
1 point	

Points awarded to Hungary (Final)
Score	Country
12 points	
10 points	
8 points	Slovakia
7 points	Romania
6 points	
5 points	
4 points	
3 points	
2 points	Serbia
1 point	Moldova; Turkey

==== Points awarded by Hungary ====
Points awarded by Hungary (Semi-final 1)
Score	Country
12 points	Finland
10 points	Albania
8 points	Switzerland
7 points	Russia
6 points	Ireland
5 points	Israel
4 points	Iceland
3 points	Romania
2 points	Moldova
1 point	Denmark

Points awarded by Hungary (Final)
Score	Country
12 points	Sweden
10 points	Germany
8 points	Albania
7 points	Russia
6 points	Iceland
5 points	Italy
4 points	Serbia
3 points	Turkey
2 points	Moldova
1 point	Spain
