= Nikoletta Szőke =

Hungarian singer

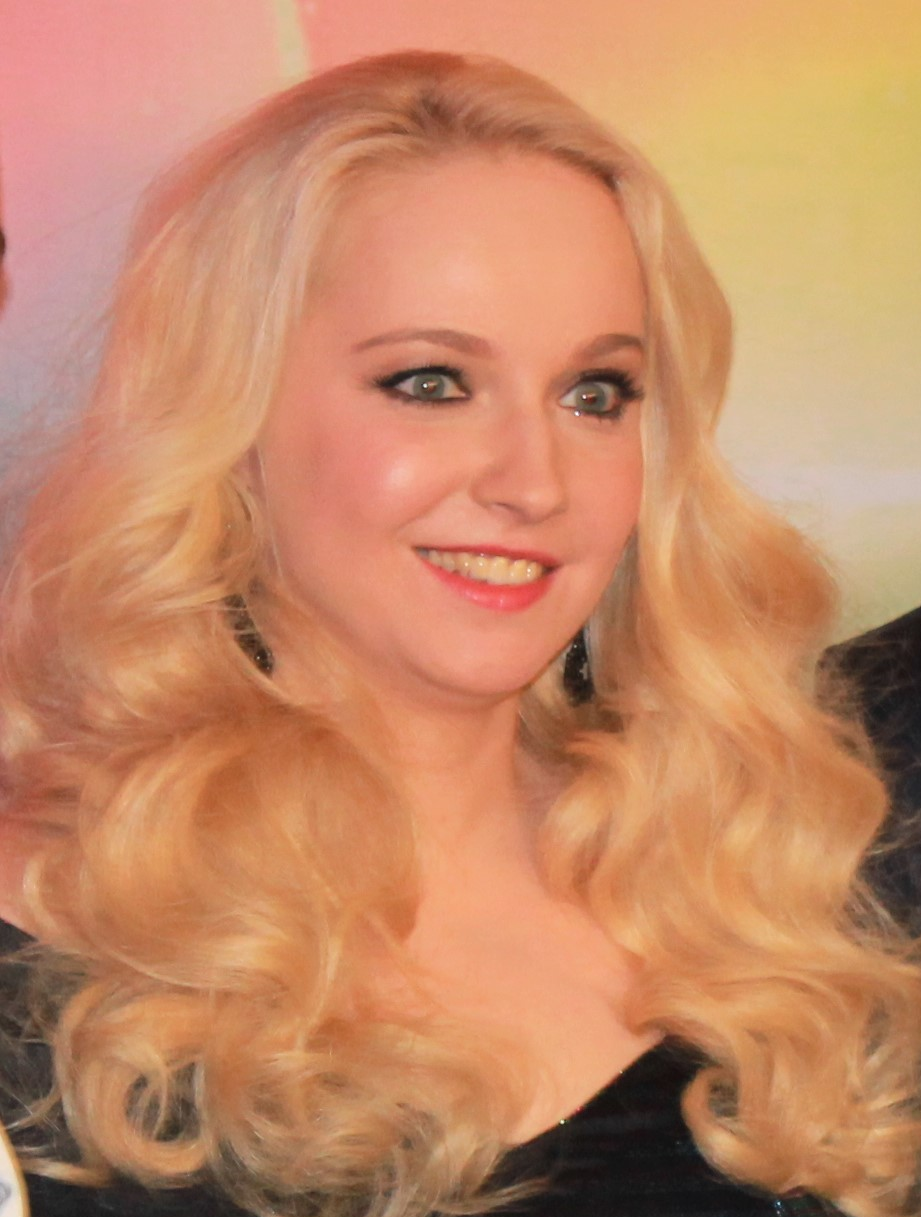

Background information
- Born: Szőke Nikoletta; 8 May 1983 (age 43); Zalaegerszeg
- Genres: Jazz
- Occupation: Singer
- Website: nikolettaszoke.com

Nikoletta Szőke is a Hungarian jazz vocalist who won international acclaim as winner of the 2005 Shure Montreux Jazz Voice Competition. Since then, she has been pursuing an increasingly successful performing career.

== Biography ==
Nikoletta Szőke is a Hungarian jazz singer, born 8 May 1983 in Zalaegerszeg, Hungary. She moved to the capital of Budapest at age four and began her studies there. Nikoletta, whose father is a professional dulcimer player, showed musical talent at an early age, attending musical kindergarten, but then broke off her music career for fourteen years.

After graduating from high school, she decided to study singing. She met her future husband on her first significant performance, József Barcza Horváth, a bass player, who introduced her to the jazz genre and celebrated jazz musician and teacher Gábor Winand .

After gaining a degree at the Technical College of Economy and External Trade Administration Department, she devotes herself solely to singing, rather than pursuing her further studies at the School of Music and ELTE University's English and Russian department.

While learning to sing, she also starts her performing career, beginning with the Robert Szakcsi Lakatos Trio, and moving on to other combos. In 2005, after three and a half years of jazz studies and performances, she applies to the prestigious international Shure Montreux Jazz Voice Competition for singers under 30. She is awarded first prize as well as the audience award. Judges included Barbara Hendricks, Randy Crawford, and others.

In January 2006, she participated in the Conference of the International Association for Jazz Education (IAJE Conference) in New York. She had held performances at the New York Hilton and the Lincoln Center's Dizzy's Club. Her partners included Gilad Hekselman, Israel (2005 Montreux Guitar Competition Winner), Harold Lopez Nussa-Torres, Cuba (2005 Montreux Piano Competition Winner) and Geoff Newman and Anthony Pinciotti from the USA. In 2008, she made the album A Song For You for the Atelier Sawano label. Musicians: Robert Lakatos on piano, Thomas Stabenow on bass, and Kalus Weiss on drums.

In 2018, she will attempt to win A Dal 2018 to represent Hungary in the Eurovision Song Contest 2018 with Attila Kökény and Róbert Szakcsi Lakatos with the song Életre kel. They were eliminated in the semi-finals.
