= Lilla Vincze =

Hungarian singer/songwriter

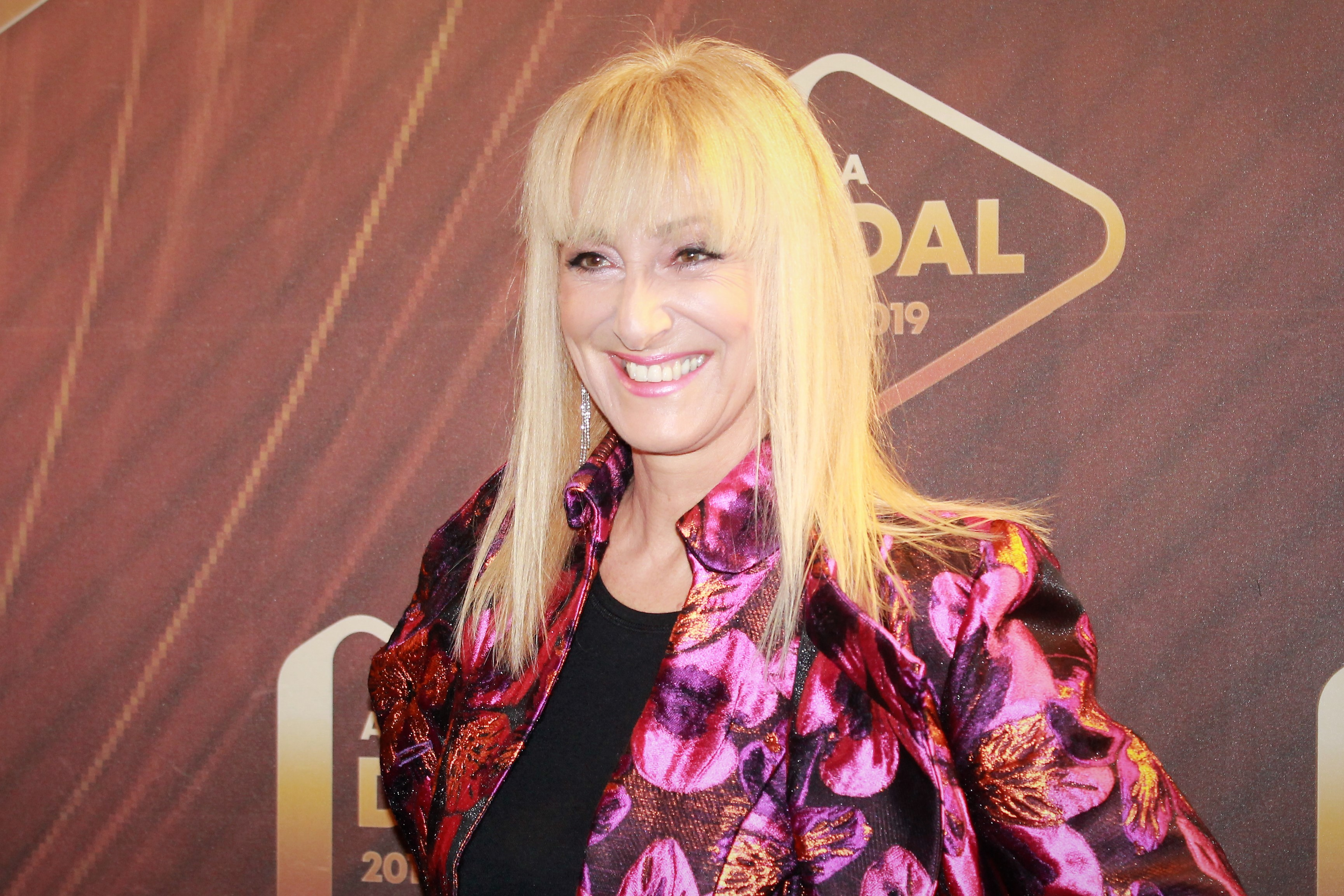
- Vincze in 2018.

Background information
- Born: 5 June 1961 (age 65); Siófok, Hungary
- Genres: Pop; rock; crossover
- Occupation: Singer
- Instrument: Vocals
- Years active: 1986–present
- Spouse: Joó Géza (2005–present)

Lilla Vincze (born 5 June 1961) is a Hungarian singer and songwriter, best known as the lead vocalist of pop band Napoleon Boulevard.

== Life ==
Vincze was born on 5 June 1961 in Siófok, Hungary. Her career began in 1986 with her joining the band Napoleon Boulevard when they won the Interpop Festival. She was initially in the band until 1990, after which she worked with István Cziglán. In the mid-2000s she started to write songs with a crossover style, and in 2008, she released the album Angyalnak, madárnak. In 2009, Napoleon Boulevard reunited.

Since 2000, Vincze has been teaching her own vocal class and has a teaching degree. She has also participated in several theatrical productions, playing Édith Piaf on the stage of the Éva Ruttkai Theatre. She gives church concerts, plays with chamber orchestra and works with the Rajkó Orchestra. In 2017, she appeared on A nagy duett, partnered with Bence Apáti.

On 3 December 2018, it was revealed that Vincze would be a judge on A Dal 2019, the 2019 edition of the national selection process for the Eurovision Song Contest 2019, to be held in Tel Aviv, Israel. She previously was a jury member for the Hungarian jury vote for the Eurovision Song Contest 2018.

== Awards ==
- Interpop Festival 1st place (1986)
- Pop-Meccs - Singer of the year (1986, 1987, 1988, 1989, 1990)
- EMeRTon award (1988)
- Transilvanian Music Awards - Special award (2013)

== Discography ==
=== Solo albums ===
- Lilla (1989)
- Lilla és Czigi (1990)
- Mámor (1992)
- Szállj velem - koncert (1993)
- Két Hold (1994)
- Mély kék (1997)
- Titanic (1999)
- Angyalnak, madárnak (2008)

=== Napoleon Boulevard (band) ===
- I. (1986)
- II. (1987)
- Júlia nem akar a földön járni (1988)
- Mennyből az angyal (1989)
- Best of 1985–1989 (2009)
- Világfalu (2010)

=== Participation ===
Year	Album	Song
1987	Moziklip	Álmunkra vigyáz
1996	Legendák 10. / A 80-as évek kislemez-sikerei	Júlia nem akar a földön járni
2005	Nagy hazai házibuli lemez - Mix	Júlia
2009	Csutkamanó titkai	Ünnep

== Theatre roles ==
The number of roles in the Theatrical Records: 2.

Play	Role	Theatre	Date	References
Steel Magnolias	Valery Boudreaux	Éva Ruttkai Theatre	30 May 1997	
Edith and Marlene	Édith Piaf	Éva Ruttkai Theatre	12 November 1997	
Kikötő		Újpest Theatre	2008	
