= Yesyes =

Hungarian musical duo

yesyes
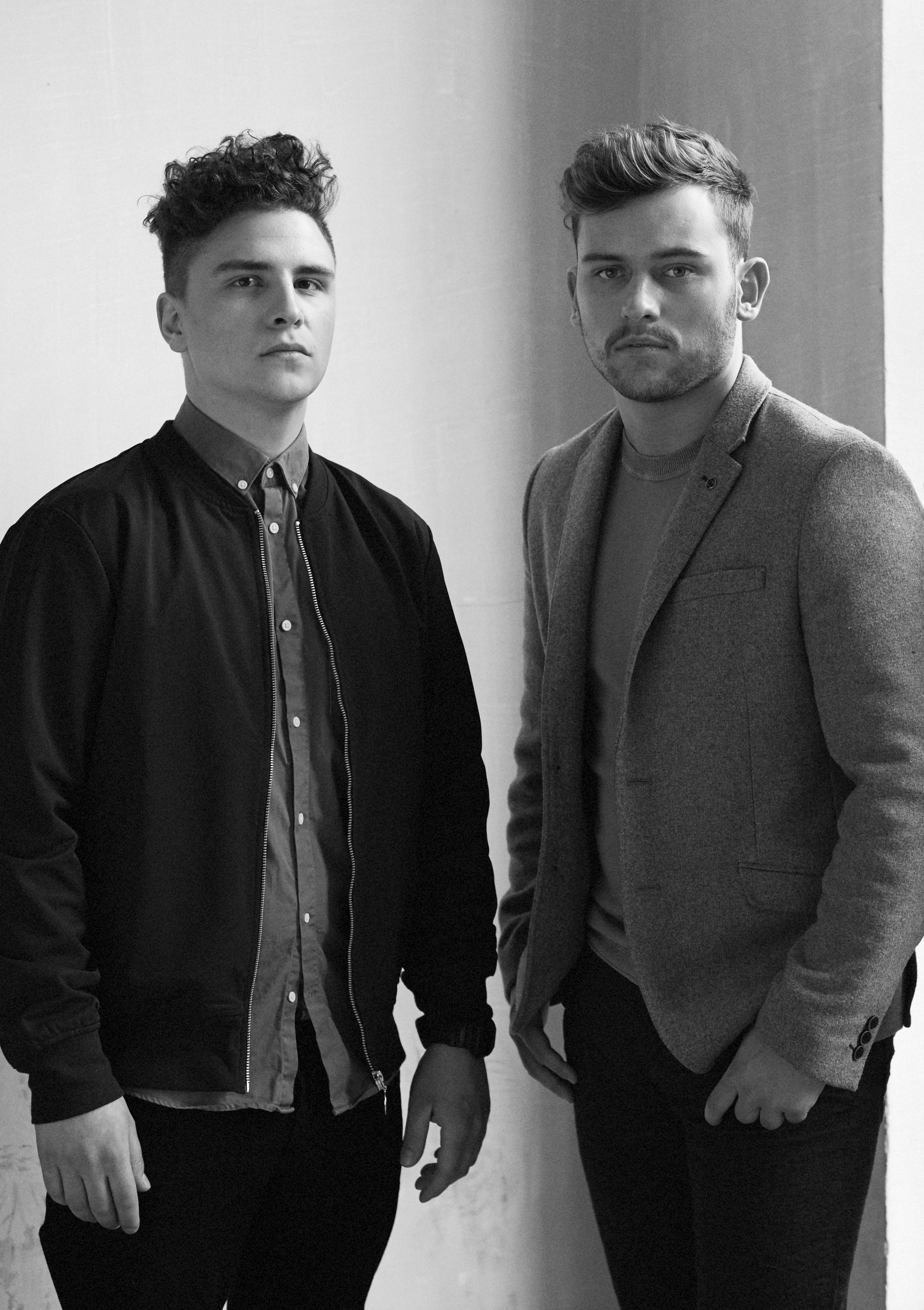
- Yesyes in 2017

Background information
- Origin: Hungary
- Genres: Downtempo; Drum and bass
- Years active: 2015–present
- Members: Ádám Szabó; Tamás Katona
- Past members: Márk Vereb

Yesyes, often stylized as yesyes, is a Hungarian downtempo and drum and bass duo formed in 2015 by Ádám Szabó (lead singer, accordion) and Tamás Katona (drums). Márk Vereb was also a member but is no longer with the group.

On 6 December 2017, it was announced by Duna TV that yesyes would participate in A Dal 2018, the 2018 edition of the Hungarian national selection process for the Eurovision Song Contest 2018 in Lisbon, Portugal with the song I Let You Run Away. They reached the superfinal. They also competed in the 2019 edition with the song Incomplete, where they were eliminated in the semi-finals.

== Discography ==
- Most Még Faj (Single, 2021)
- Gyengéden (Single, 2020)
- Darkness (Single, 2020)
- Save me now (Single, 2020)
- Sun Goes Down (Single, 2019)
- Hiába Ér Véget A Nyár (Single, 2019)
- Incomplete (Single, 2018)
- I Let You Run Away (Single, 2017)
- Te meg én (Single, 2017)
- Up on the sky (Single, 2017)
- Cycle (EP, 2017)
- Pollyanna (EP, 2016)
