= Ádám Szabó (singer) =

Hungarian musician, singer, and accordionist

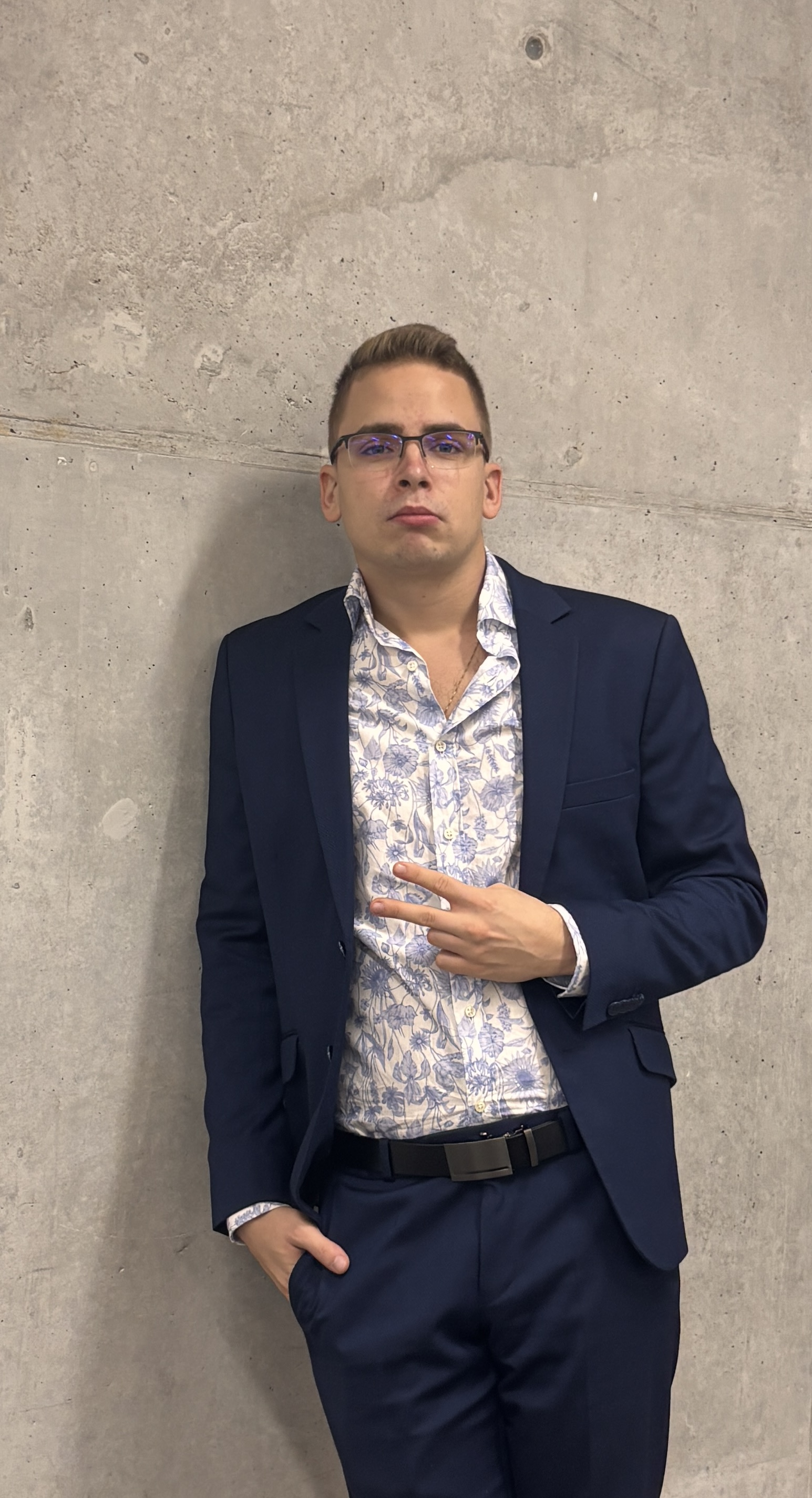
- Ádám Szabó in 2025.

Background information
- Born: 22 June 1992 (age 34); Budapest, Hungary
- Occupations: Singer, musician, accordionist
- Instruments: vocals, accordion
- Years active: 2011–present

Ádám Szabó (born 22 June 1992, Budapest) is a Hungarian singer, musician, and accordionist. He achieved fifth place in the fourth season of X-Faktor, Hungary's version of X-Factor.

== Personal life and career ==
Ádám Szabó was born on 22 June 1992 in Budapest, but grew up in the town of Érd. At the age of 5, he became interested in the accordion. He has participated in a number of Hungarian and international competitions. In 2011, he came as runner-up in the RTL Klub Got Talent-like competition "Csillag születik". Ádám finished secondary school and studied at the Franz Liszt Academy of Music in Budapest. In 2013, Ádám participated in the fourth season of X-Faktor and achieved fifth place. In March 2014, he released the song 'Nem kell többé félj'. Since 2015, he has been a part of the band yesyes.

== A Dal ==
In 2013, Szabó competed in the 2013 edition of A Dal, the national selection of the Hungarian entry for the Eurovision Song Contest 2013. He participated in the second heat with the song Hadd legyen más, and was eliminated in his respective heat.

In December 2014, it was revealed that Szabó would attempt again to win the 2015 edition of A Dal, with the song Give Me Your Love. On 31 January 2015, his song passed through the second heat, scoring the highest number of points at 46. On 14 February, he also passed through the first semi-final, going on to the final, gaining 47 points, tying with fellow contestant Boggie for the highest set of points. In the final, he received 28 points from the judges, the highest number of points in the final, but Boggie was chosen by televote to represent Hungary in the Eurovision Song Contest 2015.

Szabó participated again in A Dal, this time in the 2017 edition, with the song Together. He progressed to the semi-finals and was eliminated.

yesyes, a band that he is a part of, competed in A Dal 2018, with the song I Let You Run Away, and in A Dal 2019, with the song Incomplete.

== Discography ==
| Year | Song | Highest rank | | | | | | | Album |
| Year | Song | VIVA Chart | Class 40 | MAHASZ Editors' Choice | MAHASZ Rádiós Top 40 | MAHASZ Dance Top 40 | MAHASZ Single (track) Top 10 | EURO 200 | Album |
|---|---|---|---|---|---|---|---|---|---|
| 2013 | Hadd legyen más | | | | | | | | |
| 2014 | Nem kell többé félj | | | | | | | | |
| 2015 | Give Me Your Love | | | | | | | | |
| 2016 | Together | | | | | | | | |
| | | Totals | | | | | | | |
| 1. Rank numbers | | | | | | | | | |
| Top 10 included | | | | | | | | | |
| Top 40 included | | | | | | | | | |
