= Reni Tolvai =

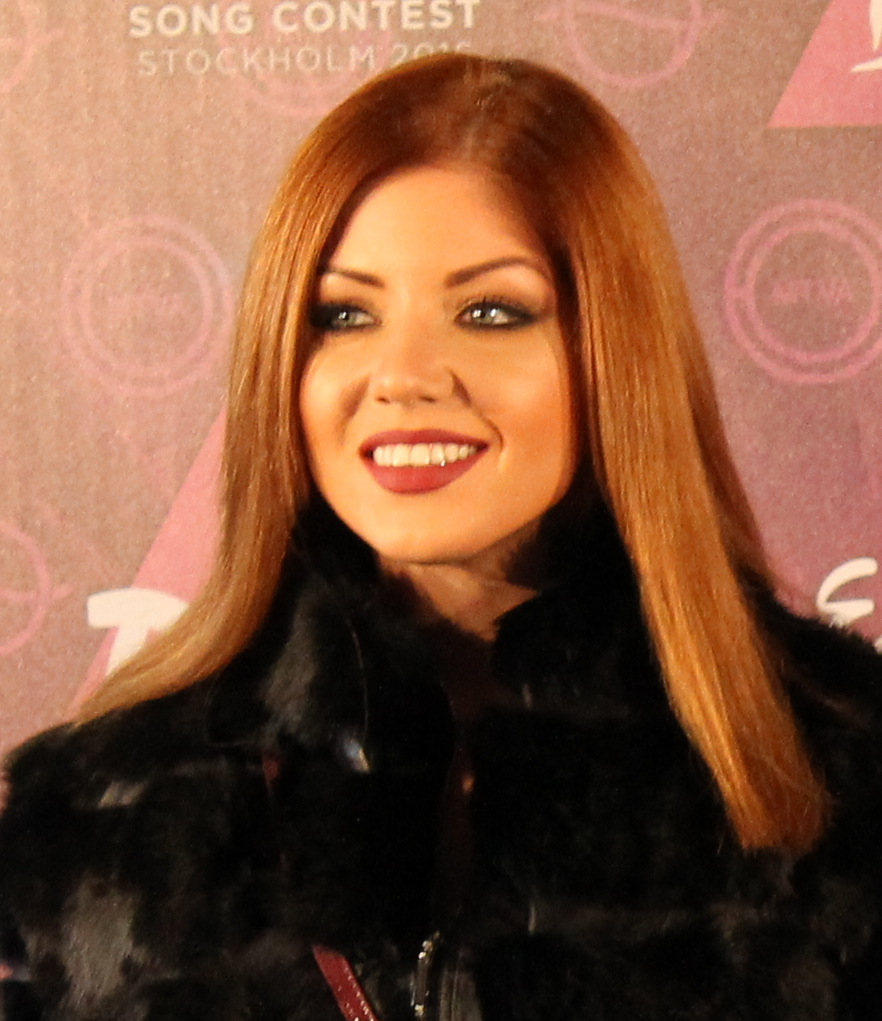
- Tolvai in 2015

Background information
- Born: Renáta Tímea Tolvai; 24 March 1991 (age 35); Oradea, Romania
- Origin: Hungary
- Genres: Pop; R&B
- Occupations: Singer; dancer; model
- Instrument: Vocals
- Years active: 2007–present
- Labels: Music Mission; Atlantic
- Website: www.tolvaireni.com

Renáta Tímea "Reni" Tolvai (born 24 March 1991) is a Hungarian-Romanian musician. She first came to prominence in 2010 after winning the fifth season of the Hungarian show Megasztár. She has gone on to win multiple awards in Hungary, and took part in A Dal in 2012, 2016, and 2018.

== Early life ==
Reni was born as Renáta Tímea Tolvai on 24 March 1991 into the Hungarian minority in Oradea, Romania.

== Music career ==
In 2010, she was only 19 when besides winning the Hungarian Idol she also became the Hungarian Voice of the Year.

Her first single "Hagylak menni" appeared with a music video in the summer of 2011, on 8 August and had a great success hitting the top charts of Hungarian radio's play lists. This single brought her the trophy of "Transylvanian Music Awards" for the Best Hungarian dance-pop hit of the Year and Bravo Otto Award Video of the Year. Today this song has over 3.5 million views on YouTube.

In 2011 Reni released her debut solo album "Ékszer".

She was also one of the most nominated and awarded woman in Hungary in the past two years:

2011 Bravo Otto – Hungarian female singer of the year 2012 Bravo Otto – Video of the year for " Hagylak menni" 2012 Bravo Otto – Hungarian female singer of the year 2012 Viva Comet – Female performer of the year 2012 Transylvanian Music Awards – Best Hungarian dance-pop hit of the Year.

In 2013, Reni's pop single "Playdate" was released. The music video for this single was released on 3 May.

In 2013, August a new song and video were released with Dj Metzker Viktória and No!End's assistance. The song was originally written and recorded in cooperation with CPR Production in the summer of 2012 in Chicago.

In 2014, she released her single "Shout" which has become one of the most popular hits of Reni. In March she went on US tour, where she performed in Pompano Beach and Sarasota, FL, Brooklyn, NY and Garfield, NJ. Following the tour the music video for Shout has been released.

Reni's music is generally R&B-pop, but she also incorporates electro pop, jazz and soul into her songs. She was always inspired by her idols Beyoncé and Aretha Franklin.

== Personal life ==
Tolvai was in a relationship with Hungarian-American singer András Kállay-Saunders. They both previously participated in Megasztár, and sang a duet on the show. They broke up in 2021 for few years. They get back together in 2024.

== Discography ==
=== Albums ===
Year	Album title	Songs' No.	Hungarian Top 40 Record Albums and Compilations
2010	Megasztár Final Songs	?	8
2011	"Ékszer"	?	18

=== Singles ===
Year	Song title	Viva Online Chart HU	Viva Chart HU	Viva Napi Top 10 HU	Viva Napi Top 21 HU	Class40	Composer	Lyrics	Length
2013	"Promise"	?	?	?	?	?	?	?	
2013	"Playdate"	?	?	?	?	?	?	?	
2011	"Hagylak menni"	1	1	1	1	27	István Tabár, Márk Pacsai, Péter Krajczár	István Tabár	3:58
2011	"Ez még csak a kezdet"	10	15	1	1	?	?	?	
2012	"Élek a szemeidben"	?	?	1	1	?	?	?	

=== Music videos ===
Year	Song title	Director	Album
2011	"Hagylak menni"	Valentin Bajkov, Pál Nánási	"Ékszer"
2012	"Élek a szemeidben"	Valentin Bajkov, Pál Nánási	
2013	"Playdate"		
2013	"Promise"		

== Television appearances ==
- Megasztár – contestant
- A nagy duett – contestant
- Aktív – guest
- Mokka – guest
- Frizbi Hajdú Péterrel – guest
- Hőálló Megálló – guest
- A Dal – contestant

== Awards ==
- 5th Megasztár – 1st Place (the Voice of the Year)(2010)
- Award for the Hungarian Culture (2011)
- Transylvanian Music Awards – the Best Hungarian dance-pop hit of the Year (2012)

== See also ==
- Hungarian pop
