= Leander Kills =

Hungarian metal band

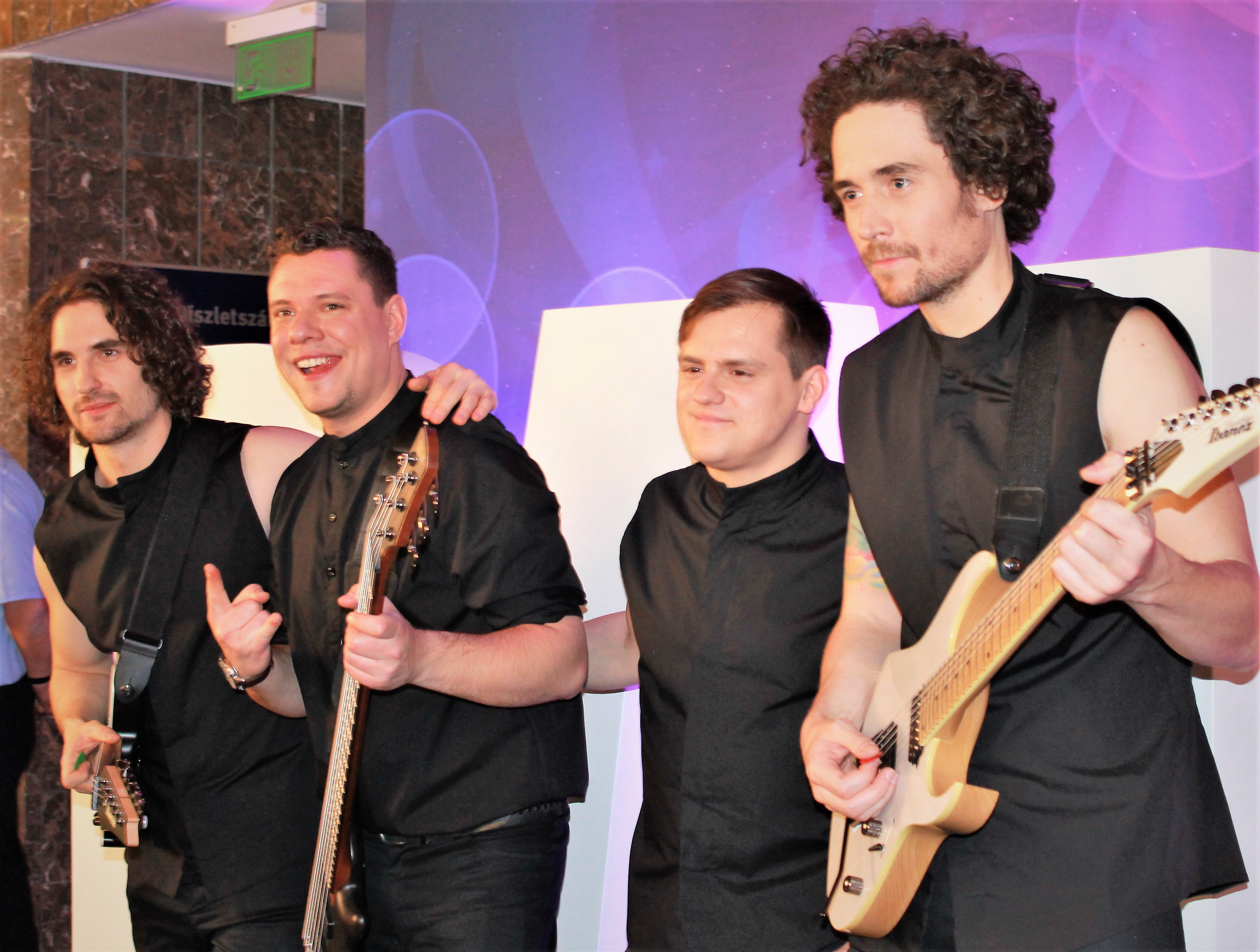
- Leander Kills in 2018

Background information
- Origin: Hungary
- Genres: Metal
- Years active: 2015–present
- Labels: Keytracks Hungary
- Members: Leander Köteles; Gábor Nyerják; Bence Barkóczi; Valentin Jankai
- Past members: Máté Bodor; Miklós Czifra; András Vermes

Leander Kills is a Hungarian metal band, created by guitarist and singer Leander Köteles of Leander Rising fame. Other members include Miklós Czifra (Balkan Fanatik, Amigod) and András Vermes playing guitars, and Valentin Jankai (Blind Myself) playing the drums.

On November 2, 2015, their first song, Szerelmetlen dal, was released. Not long after, Te leszel a párom and Valami folyjon were released. On 18 March 2016, their first album, Túlélő, was released.

In 2017, it became clear that Máté Bodor, due to his obligations under Alestorm, could not go on tour with Leander Kills. András Vermes joined the band later on. Köteles has said that the band would later regard Máté Bodor as an honorary member, expecting him on future recordings, and, if his time allows, during concerts.

Leander Kills has participated in A Dal, the Hungarian national selection to the Eurovision Song Contest, three times. Their first participation was in 2017, finishing in the final with their song Élet. In 2018, they came in the final again with their song Nem szól harang. The band's third entry, in 2019 with the song Hazavágyom, did not qualify from the heats.

== Members ==
- Leander Köteles – bass guitar, vocals, piano
- Miklós Czifra – guitar (2015-2023)
- András Vermes – guitar (2015-2023)
- Valentin Jankai – drums

== Discography ==
- Túlélő (2016)
- Élet a halál előtt (2017)
- Luxusnyomor (2019)
- IV (2020)
- Vérkeringő (2022)
- Ébredés (2024)
