= Annamari Dancs =

Romanian-Hungarian singer (born 1981)

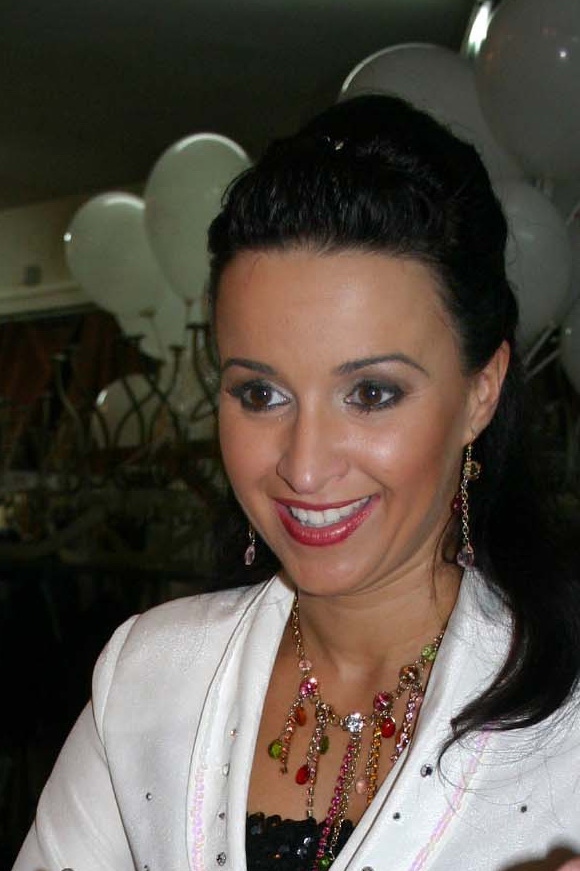
- Image: László Horváth
- Born: 11 March 1981 (age 45); Sfântu Gheorghe, Romania
- Citizenship: Hungarian
- Occupation: Singer
- Years active: 1991–present
- Website: www.dancsannamari.com/indexhu.php

Annamari Dancs is a Romanian-Hungarian singer. She was born in Sfântu Gheorghe, Romania. Her father, Árpád, was a music teacher and later manager of Dancs Market Records. Her mother, Anna-Mária, was also a teacher and her older brother Zsolt is her concert manager and drummer of her band.

== Career ==
After completing school in the music conservatory, Gheoghe Dima Academy of Music, in Cluj-Napoca, Romania, Dancs graduated as an opera singer. Over the past 10 years, she held multiple concerts as pop singer, not only in Romania and Hungary, but also a guest in Sweden, the United States, the Netherlands and Slovakia.

So far, she released nine record albums, seven maxi-albums, and three DVDs. She has fifteen video clips shot in different parts of the world, and she appeared this spring in a musical program on TVR 1, the Hungarian-language broadcast, Zenedoboz.

In 2011, she acquired Hungarian citizenship.

== Recordings ==
- Felhőkön is túl (1999)
- Szívemben élsz (2001)
- Erdélyi nosztalgia (2001)
- Te vagy az egyetlen (2002)
- Dancs Annamari 5 (2003)
- Szerelem kell (2005)
- Delicios (in Romanian; 2005)
- Best Of (2006)
- Egy a szívem, egy a párom (2007)
- Live your life feat. DJ Robert Georgescu (2009)
- Aha (Oneira) feat. DJ Robert Georgescu (2010)
- Feel (2012) – Entry to the Hungarian National Final for the Eurovision Song Contest 2012
