= A Dal =

- Genre: Music, entertainment, reality television
- Country of origin: Hungary
- Original language: Hungarian
- No. of series: 11

Original release
- Network: Duna (2016– ), Duna World (2012– ), M1 (2012–2015),
- Release: 28 January 2012 – present

A Dal (English: The Song) is an annual music competition in Hungary organised by the national broadcaster Duna since 2012 and served as the national selection process for the Eurovision Song Contest between 2012 and 2019.

The contest was introduced by the MTVA, the organisers of the contest, with a different philosophy than the contest used previously. A Dal was introduced to produce a Hungarian contest, with Hungarian musical tastes being presented to a European audience. The contest is also an open one, with all information of the songs being revealed in the selection process.

== Format ==
The selected songs in the contest are shown to the Hungarian public through a number of special shows. It includes three heats (four in 2021), two semi-finals, and then a final.

Ten songs compete in each heat, with six moving on to the semi-finals, five from the jury and public together and one from the public exclusively selected in a second round. Nine songs compete in each semi-final. Four songs from each semi-final move on to the final, three advancing due to the jury and public and one due to the public exclusively. The final winner is selected through two rounds of voting: the first round selects the top four songs out of the eight finalists; the second round selects the winner from the four remaining songs. The first round uses only the jury and the second round uses only the public.

Between 2012 and 2019, A Dal was used as the selection process for the Hungarian entry in the Eurovision Song Contest. Hungary withdrew from Eurovision in 2020, but despite this, A Dal is still being held as a standalone music competition.

== Winners ==
The first winner of A Dal was the electronic band Compact Disco with the song "Sound of Our Hearts". At the Eurovision Song Contest 2012, the group qualified to the final (10th place in the semi-final with 52 points), and placing 24th in the final with 19 points.

The most successful A Dal winner in the Eurovision Song Contest is András Kállay-Saunders and his song "Running". At the 2014 edition, Kállay-Saunders qualified for the final (placed 3rd in the semi-final with 127 points) and later placed 5th with 143 points, earning Hungary's second best placement ever and only top five finish since 1994.

Year	Song	Artist	Songwriter(s)	In the Eurovision Song Contest			
Year	Song	Artist	Songwriter(s)	Final place	Final points	Semi place	Semi points
2012	"Sound of Our Hearts"	Compact Disco	Behnam Lotfi, Csaba Walkó, Attila Sándor, Gábor Pál	24	19	10	52
2013	"Kedvesem (Zoohacker Remix)"	ByeAlex	Alex Márta, Zoltán Palásti Kovács "Zoohacker"	10	84	8	66
2014	"Running"	András Kállay-Saunders	András Kállay-Saunders, Krisztián Szakos	5	143	3	127
2015	"Wars for Nothing"	Boggie	Boglárka Csemer, Áron Sebestyén, Sára Hélène Bori	20	19	8	67
2016	"Pioneer"	Freddie	Zé Szabó / Borbála Csarnai	19	108	4	197
2017	"Origo"	Joci Pápai	József Pápai	8	200	2	231
2018	"Viszlát nyár"	AWS	Dániel Kökényes, Bence Brucker, Áron Veress, Soma Schiszler, Örs Siklósi	21	93	10	111
2019	"Az én apám"	Joci Pápai	József Pápai, Ferenc Molnár Caramel	Did not qualify		12	97
2020	"Mostantól"	Gergő Rácz and Reni Orsovai	Máté Bella, Szabolcs Hujber, Gergő Rácz	Did not participate			
2021	"Egyetlen szó"	Kaukázus	János Kardos-Horváth, Tamás Kontor	Did not participate			
2022	"Nem adom el"	Ibolya Oláh	Sándor Födő, György Hegyi, Vivien Csakmag	Did not participate			
2023	"Éjféli járat"	Titán	Előd Szabó	Did not participate			
2024	"Legényes"	Evelin László	Evelin Gréta László	Did not participate			
2025	"Szél úgy beszél..."	Gypo Circus and Jennifer Szirota	Kosta Velcsev Dejanov, Gellért Nagy, Zsolt Préda-Kovács, Sándor Kecskeméti, Dzsenifer Szirota, Zoltán Muhel, Andrea Delia Miron, Ádám Gergő Drahota	Did not participate			
2026	"Veled álmodtam"	Re Va Dame	Milán Hodován, Rebeka Valéria Balogh	Did not participate			

== See also ==
- Hungary in the Eurovision Song Contest
