= X-Faktor (Hungarian TV series) =

Hungarian version of The X Factor

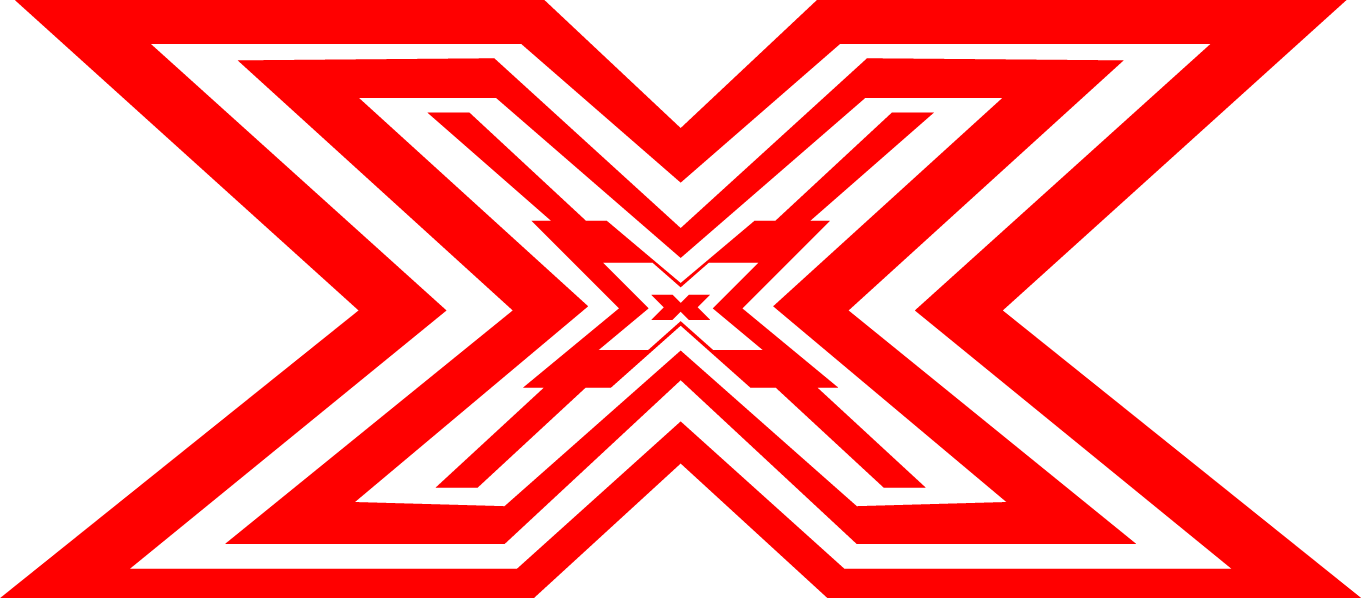
- Created by: Simon Cowell
- Presented by: Nóra Ördög; Balázs Sebestyén; Bence Istenes; Lilu; Ramóna Kiss; Dávid Miller; Joci Pápai
- Judges: Péter Geszti; Ildikó Keresztes; Miklós Malek; Feró Nagy; Róbert Alföldi; Róbert Szikora; Gabi Tóth; Gábor Szűcs; ByeAlex; Laci Gáspár; Peti Puskás; Gigi Radics; Bogi Dallos; Adél Csobot; Erika Herceg; Péter Majoros; Milán Valkusz; Andrea Tóth; Solére
- Original language: Hungarian
- No. of series: 13
- No. of episodes: 186

Production
- Production companies: IKO Műsorgyártó Kft. (2010–2014); UFA Magyarország Kft. (2016–present); Fremantle; Syco Entertainment

Original release
- Network: RTL
- Release: 28 August 2010 – present

X-Faktor is the Hungarian version of The X Factor, a show originating from the United Kingdom. It is a television music talent show contested by aspiring pop singers drawn from public auditions. The show premiered in 2010 and it continues its success nowadays in the thirteenth series.

The original judging panel consisted of Feró Nagy, Miklós Malek, Ildikó Keresztes and Péter Geszti. Róbert Szikora, Gabi Tóth, and Róbert Alföldi joined the judging panel in the Fourth series replacing Nagy, Malek and Ildikó Keresztes, who left the show after the Third series, due to career commitments. In series 5 Little G Weevil took the place of original judge Geszti, who left the show to focus on his music career. In 2015 RTL Klub did not order a new season, instead they aired the first series of Hungary's Got Talent. The show returned in 2016, with new judges ByeAlex, Laci Gáspár and Peti Puskás replacing Alföldi, Szikora and Little G. The show was originally hosted by Balázs Sebestyén and Nóra Ördög. Sebestyén left the show after the First series. Nóra Ördög presented the show in the 2011 and in 2012 In 2013 she was replaced with Lilu and Bence Istenes. In 2014 Lilu left the show Istenes presents the show as a solo host onwards. After Istenes, the new host was Ramóna Kiss between and 2019 (Istenes hosted the season 7 finale, because Kiss wasn't available). In 2021, Dávid Miller became host, and, beginning in 2024, was joined by Joci Pápai. The current hosts since 2026 are Babett Köllő and Márk Ember. The jury also had changed through the years, the current judges are: Laci Gáspár, Péter Majoros, ByeAlex and Solére.

There have been thirteen winners of the show to date: Csaba Vastag, Tibor Kocsis, Gergő Oláh, Dóra Danics, Andi Tóth, Barbara Opitz, Ricco & Claudia, USNK, Tibor Ruszó, ALEE, Bernadett Solyom, Krisztián Fehér and Belano.

== Series summary ==
"Peter Geszti" category
"Ildiko Keresztes" category
"Fero Nagy" category
"Miklos Malek" category
"Robert Alföldi" category
"Robert Szikora" category
"Gabi Toth" category
"Gabor Szucs" category
"ByeAlex" category
"Laci Gaspar" category
"Peti Puskas" category
"Gigi Radics" category
"Bogi Dallos" category
"Adél Csobot" category
"Erika Herceg" category
"Péter Majoros" category
"Milán Valkusz" category
"Andrea Tóth" category
"Solére" category

Series	Start	Finish	Winner	Runner up	Third place	Fourth place	Winning mentor	Presenter(s)	Main judges (no order)			
Series	Start	Finish	Winner	Runner up	Third place	Fourth place	Winning mentor	Presenter(s)	1	2	3	4
1	28 August 2010	19 December 2010	Csaba Vastag	Nikolas Takács	Norbi L. Király	Veca Janicsák	Feró Nagy	Nóra Ördög; Balázs Sebestyén	Péter Geszti	Ildikó Keresztes	Miklós Malek	Feró Nagy
2	3 September 2011	18 December 2011	Tibor Kocsis	Enikő Muri	Gergő Baricz	Tamás Tarány	Miklós Malek	Nóra Ördög	Péter Geszti	Ildikó Keresztes	Miklós Malek	Feró Nagy
3	1 September 2012	16 December 2012	Gergő Oláh	Tímea Antal	Adél Csobot	Dávid Szabó	Péter Geszti	Nóra Ördög	Péter Geszti	Ildikó Keresztes	Miklós Malek	Feró Nagy
4	7 September 2013	15 December 2013	Dóra Danics	ByTheWay	Tünde Krasznai	Ákos Csordás	Péter Geszti	Lilu; Bence Istenes	Péter Geszti	Róbert Szikora	Gabi Tóth	Róbert Alföldi
5	6 September 2014	21 December 2014	Andrea Tóth	Juli Horányi	Benji	Richárd Nagy	Róbert Szikora	Bence Istenes	Gábor Szűcs	Róbert Szikora	Gabi Tóth	Róbert Alföldi
6	24 September 2016	17 December 2016	Barbara Opitz	Ricsi Mata	Dmitrij Gorbunov	Ham ko Ham	Gabi Tóth	Bence Istenes	Laci Gáspár	ByeAlex	Gabi Tóth	Péter Puskás
7	2 September 2017	25 November 2017	Ricco & Claudia	Serena Rigacci	Roland Gulyás	Bettina Tóth	Laci Gáspár	Ramóna Kiss ^{1}	Laci Gáspár	ByeAlex	Gigi Radics	Péter Puskás
8	6 October 2018	15 December 2018	USNK	Stolen Beat	Gabriella Tamáska	Tímea Arany	ByeAlex	Ramóna Kiss ^{1}	Laci Gáspár	ByeAlex	Gigi Radics	Péter Puskás
9	5 October 2019	14 December 2019	Tibor Ruszó	Andor Vanek	Patrik Zdroba	Emánuel Gödöllei	ByeAlex	Ramóna Kiss ^{1}	Laci Gáspár	ByeAlex	Bogi Dallos	Péter Puskás
10	9 October 2021	18 December 2021	Alex Balázs (ALEE)	Paulina Kocsis	Kamilla Ferenczi	Marci Mehringer	ByeAlex	Dávid Miller	Laci Gáspár	ByeAlex	Adél Csobot	Péter Puskás
11	3 September 2022	19 November 2022	Bernadett Solyom	Kevin Kiss	Luca Mihályfi	Alexa Helfy	ByeAlex	Dávid Miller	Laci Gáspár	ByeAlex	Erika Herceg	Péter Puskás
12	7 September 2024	7 December 2024	Krisztián Fehér	Roland Sárközi	Éberkóma	Nóra Zilincki	Milán Valkusz	Dávid Miller; Joci Pápai	Laci Gáspár	Milán Valkusz	Andrea Tóth	Péter Majoros
13	6 September 2025	6 December 2025	Belano	Imi Varga	Tonix Honix	Ancsi Farkas	Andrea Tóth	Dávid Miller; Joci Pápai	Laci Gáspár	Milán Valkusz	Andrea Tóth	Péter Majoros
14	5 September 2026							Babett Köllő; Márk Ember	Laci Gáspár	Solére	ByeAlex	Péter Majoros

Notes

1. In the Finale of the series 7 the presenter was Bence Istenes.
Current
Past

Hosts	2010	2011	2012	2013	2014	2016	2017	2018	2019	2021	2022	2024	2025	2026
Babett Köllő														
Márk Ember														
Joci Pápai														
Dávid Miller														
Ramóna Kiss														
Bence Istenes														
Lilu														
Nóra Ördög														
Balázs Sebestyén														
Judges	2010	2011	2012	2013	2014	2016	2017	2018	2019	2021	2022	2024	2025	2026
Solére														
Andrea Tóth														
Milán Valkusz														
Péter Majoros														
Laci Gáspár														
Erika Herceg														
Peti Puskás														
ByeAlex														
Adél Csobot														
Bogi Dallos														
Gigi Radics														
Gabi Tóth														
Gabor Szucs														
Róbert Alföldi														
Róbert Szikora														
Péter Geszti														
Ildikó Keresztes														
Miklós Malek														
Feró Nagy														

== Judges' categories and their contestants ==
In each season, each judge is allocated a category to mentor and chooses three acts to progress to the live shows. This table shows, for each season, which category each judge was allocated and which acts he or she put through to the live shows.

– Winning judge/category. Winners are in bold, eliminated contestants in small font.

Season	Péter Geszti	Ildikó Keresztes	Miklós Malek	Feró Nagy
One	**Girls**; Veca Janicsák; Dorka Shodeinde; Fanni Domokos	**Boys**; Nikolas Takács; Norbi L. Király; Tamás Vastag	**Groups**; Non Stop; Summer Sisters; Mimi és Gergő	**Over 25s** **Csaba Vastag**; Kati Wolf; Mariann Szabó
Two	**Groups**; Rocktenors; Apollo23; Ikrek	**Boys**; Gergő Baricz; Lil' C. Tamás Demes	**Over 25s** **Tibor Kocsis**; Tamás Tarány; Tibor Gyurcsík	**Girls**; Enikő Muri; Vera Kováts; Alexa Bagosi
Three	**Boys**; **Gergő Oláh**; Dávid Szabó; Zoltán Fehér	**Over 28s** László Kovács; Krisztián Zámbó; Bea Lass	**Girls**; Tímea Antal; Adél Csobot; Andrea Kvaka	**Groups**; Like; Spirit; P.J.Z.
Season	Péter Geszti	Gabi Tóth	Róbert Szikora	Róbert Alföldi
Four	**Over 25s** **Dóra Danics**; Tünde Krasznai; Márk Bozsek	**Boys**; Ákos Csordás; Ádám Szabó; Marcell Tóth	**Groups**; ByTheWay; Fat Phoenix; MDC	**Girls**; Lili Péterffy; Lili Batánovics; Anikó Eckert
Season	Gábor Szűcs	Gabi Tóth	Róbert Szikora	Róbert Alföldi
Five	**Over 25s** Juli Horányi; Jonathan Andelic; Zsófi Kállai-Kiss	**Groups**; Tha Shudras; Spoon; Pálinka Republik	**Girls**; **Andrea Tóth**; Izabella Jakab-Péter; Jenifer Ilyés	**Boys**; Benji; Richárd Nagy; Richárd Borbély; Richárd Szabó
Season	Laci Gáspár	Gabi Tóth	ByeAlex	Peti Puskás
Six	**Over 25s** Szandra Fejes; János Ónodi; Eszter Balogh	**Girls**; **Barbara Opitz**; Liza Vince Alíz; Kinga Jáger	**Groups**; Ham ko Ham; Soulbreakers; Jaggers	**Boys**; Ricsi Mata; Dmitrij Gorbunov; Gergő Dánielfy
Season	Laci Gáspár	Gigi Radics	ByeAlex	Peti Puskás
Seven	**Groups**; **Ricco & Claudia**; London Kids; Radio Mobster	**Boys**; Roland Gulyás; Dániel Bereznay; Norbert Mézes	**Girls**; Serena Rigacci; Bettina Tóth; Viola Erdős	**Over 25s** Dániel Berta; Lívia Abaházi Nagy; Péter Hegedűs
Eight	**Girls**; Gabriella Tamáska; Tímea Arany; Vivien Urbanovics	**Over 25s** Taka Kurokava; János Balog; László Ölveti	**Groups**; **USNK**; Stolen Beat; Ricky and the Drunken Sailors	**Boys**; Pál Kovács; Gergö Szekér; Krisztián Nagy
Season	Laci Gáspár	Bogi Dallos	ByeAlex	Peti Puskás
Nine	**Over 25s** Patrik Zdroba; Renátó Burai; Antal Balogh	**Girls**; Enikő Bagdi; Blanka Dárdai; Aletta Huszár	**Boys**; **Tibor Ruszó**; Andor Vanek; Emánuel Gödöllei	**Groups**; Take 3 C.O.O.L; Speranta
Season	Laci Gáspár	Adél Csobot	ByeAlex	Peti Puskás
Ten	**Over 22s** Paulina Kocsis; Mardoll; Imi Plaza	**Groups**; The Harmonies; The Palace; Beneath My Skin	**Boys**; **Alex Balázs (ALEE)**; Marci Mehringer; Roland Tóth	**Girls**; Kamilla Ferenczi; Regina Nagy; Flóra Tabatabai
Season	Laci Gáspár	Erika Herceg	ByeAlex	Peti Puskás
Eleven	Luca Mihályfi; Szebasztián Serbán; Sophia Khan	Alexa Helfy; Enikő Bodrogi; Synergy	**Bernadett Solyom**; Isky & Szkym; Ádám Beretka	Kevin Kiss; Marcell Boros; Ábel Váradi
Season	Laci Gáspár	Andrea Tóth	Milán Valkusz	Péter Majoros
Twelve	Roland Sárközi; Sándor Toldi; Bence Szabó	Nóra Zilincki; Zsombor Kundra; Monica Pike	**Krisztián Fehér**; Henn; Steve Major	Éberkóma; Koren; Vivien Miklós
Thirteen	Nazyra; Lil Davis; LilyZ	**Belano**; Márkó Istenes; Anna Patai; Anett Mohácsi	Balla Béla; CFL; Dea Kollár	Imi Varga; Tonix Honix; Ancsi Farkas
Season	Laci Gáspár	Solére	ByeAlex	Péter Majoros
Fourteen	Anna Kovács; Viktória Fehér; Alexandra Horvath	Dzsi Maté; Tory; KRSZ	Rebeka Kristóf; Vivien Oláh; Mark Fabri	Szilver; Wasp; Betti Becz

== Season 1 (2010) ==
The auditions started in the summer of 2010, with more than 5,000 candidates for the first series in Hungary.

=== Contestants ===
The top twelve acts were confirmed as follows:

Key:

– Winner
– Runner-up
– Third place

Category (mentor)	Acts		
Boys (Keresztes)	Norbi L. Király	Nikolas Takács	Tamás Vastag
Girls (Geszti)	Fanni Domokos	Veca Janicsák	Dorka Shodeinde
Over 25s (Nagy)	Mariann Szabó	Csaba Vastag	Kati Wolf
Groups (Malek)	Mimi és Gergő	Non Stop	Summer Sisters

== Season 2 (2011) ==
The auditions started in the spring of 2011, with thousands of candidates for the second series in Hungary.

=== Contestants ===
Key:

– Winner
– Runner-up
– Third place

Category (mentor)	Acts		
Boys (Keresztes)	Gergő Baricz	Tamás Demes	Lil C.
Girls (Nagy)	Alexa Bagosi	Vera Kováts	Enikő Muri
Over 25s (Malek)	Tibor Gyurcsík	Tibor Kocsis	Tamás Tarány
Groups (Geszti)	Apollo23	Ikrek	Rocktenors

== Season 3 (2012) ==
The producers' auditions started at the Spring of 2012. Thousands of hopefuls were waiting for their auditions. The judges auditions took place at Budapest on 25–28 June.

=== Contestants ===
Key:

– Winner
– Runner-up
– Third place

Category (mentor)	Acts		
Boys (Geszti)	Zoltán Fehér	Gergő Oláh	Dávid Szabó
Girls (Malek)	Tímea Antal	Adél Csobot	Andrea Kvaka
Over 25s (Keresztes)	László Kovács	Bea Lass	Krisztián Zámbó
Groups (Nagy)	Like	P.J.Z.	Spirit

== Season 4 (2013) ==
On 16 December 2012 the show's host Nóra Ördög announced, that the show will be back for its fourth season in 2013. The apply for the auditions started on the same day.

Three of the original judges left the show after the third series; Miklós Malek, Feró Nagy and Ildikó Keresztes. The original host Nóra Ördög left the show due to her pregnancy.

On 29 April RTL announced the new judges. Péter Geszti is the only original judge, who returned for season 4. The three new judges are: Gabi Tóth, Róbert Szikora and Róbert Alföldi. The RTL announced in May, that two new hosts will present the show in 2013. They are Lilu and Bence Istenes.

=== Contestants ===
Key:

– Winner
– Runner-up
– Third place
– Withdrew

Category (mentor)	Acts		
Boys (Tóth)	Ákos Csordás	Ádám Szabó	Marcell Tóth
Girls (Alföldi)	Lili Batánovics	Anikó Eckert	Lili Péterffy
Over 25s (Geszti)	Márk Bozsek	Dóra Danics	Tünde Krasznai
Groups (Szikora)	ByTheWay	Fat Phoenix	MDC

== Season 5 (2014) ==
Péter Geszti, the only original judge left, announced his intention to leave the show after the fourth series to concentrate on his music career. The three other judges returned for a second series alongside new judge Gábor Szűcs.

Original host Nóra Ördög was to return to the show for this series, but she became pregnant. RTL asked Bence Istenes back to host the show for a second run.

=== Contestants ===
Key:

– Winner
– Runner-Up
– Third place

Category (mentor)	Acts			
Boys (Alföldi)	Benji	Richárd Borbély	Richárd Nagy	Richárd Szabó
Girls (Szikora)	Jenifer Ilyés	Izabella Jakab-Péter	Andrea Tóth	
Over 25s (Szűcs)	Jonathan Andelic	Juli Horányi	Zsófi Kállai-Kiss	
Groups (Tóth)	Pálinka Republik	Spoon	Tha Shudras	

== Season 6 (2016) ==
=== Contestants ===
Key:

– Winner
– Runner-Up
– Third place

Category (mentor)	Acts		
Boys (Puskás)	Gergő Dánielfy	Dmitrij Gorbunov	Ricsi Mata
Girls (Tóth)	Kinga Jáger	Barbara Opitz	Liza Vince Aliz
Over 25s (Gáspár)	Eszter Balogh	Szandra Fejes	János Ónodi
Groups (ByeAlex)	Ham ko Ham	Jaggers	Soulbreakers

Kristóf Petics had originally been chosen for the live shows, but was disqualified from the competition due to him performing fighting and problematic behavior. He was replaced by Ricsi Mata.

== Season 7 (2017) ==
=== Contestants ===
Key:

– Winner
– Runner-Up
– Third place
– Withdrawn

Category (mentor)	Chosen by mentor		Chosen by other mentors	
Boys (Radics)	Roland Gulyás	Krisztián Nagy^{1}	Norbert Mézes	Dániel Bereznay
Girls (ByeAlex)	Viola Erdős	Bettina Tóth	Serena Rigacci	
Over 25s (Puskás)	Lívia Abaházi Nagy	Dániel Berta	Péter Hegedűs	
Groups (Gáspár)	Radio Mobster	Ricco & Claudia	London Kids	

At the X-Factor press conference on 11 October, Krisztián Nagy announced that he was withdrawing from the competition due to difficulties he was having during the preparation period. He was replaced by Daniel Bereznay.

== Season 8 (2018) ==
=== Contestants ===
Key:

– Winner
– Runner-Up
– Third Place
– Withdrawn

Category (mentor)	Chosen by mentor		Chosen by other mentors
Boys (Puskás)	Krisztián Nagy	Gergő Szekér	Pál Kovács
Girls (Gáspár)	Tímea Arany	Gabriella Tamáska	Vivien Urbanovics
Over 25s (Radics)	János Balog	László Ölveti	Taka Kurokava
Groups (ByeAlex)	Stolen Beat	USNK	Ricky and the Drunken Sailors

At the X-Factor press conference on 14 November, Krisztián Nagy announced that he was withdrawing from the competition.

== Season 9 (2019) ==
=== Contestants ===
Key:

– Winner
– Runner-Up
– Third Place

Category (mentor)	Chosen by mentor		Chosen by other mentors
Boys (ByeAlex)	Emánuel Gödöllei	Andor Vanek	Tibor Ruszó
Girls (Dallos)	Enikő Bagdi	Blanka Dárdai	Aletta Huszár
Over 25s (Gáspár)	Renátó Burai	Patrik Zdroba	Antal Balogh
Groups (Puskás)	C.O.O.L	Take 3	Speranta

== Series 10 (2021) ==
On 20 October 2020, RTL Klub announced that they would not return in 2020, due to COVID-19. They stated that the pandemic would not allow them to start the auditions in time. Around the same time it was announced that the show would return in 2021.

=== Contestants ===
Key:

– Winner
– Runner-Up
– Third Place

Category (mentor)	Chosen by mentor		Chosen by other mentors
Boys (ByeAlex)	ALEE	Marci Mehringer	Roland Tóth
Girls (Puskás)	Kamilla Ferenczi	Regina Nagy	Flóra Tabatabai Nejat
Over 22s (Gáspár)	Paulina	Imi Plaza	Mardoll
Groups (Csobot)	The Harmonies	The Palace	Beneath My Skin

== Series 11 (2022) ==
=== Contestants ===
Key:

– Winner
– Runner-Up
– Third Place

Mentor	Chosen by mentor		Chosen by other mentors
Laci Gáspár	Luca Mihályfi	Szebasztián Serbán	Sophia Khan
ByeAlex	Isky & Szkym	Bernadett Solyom	Ádám Beretka
Erika Herceg	Enikő Bodrogi	Synergy	Alexa Helfy
Peti Puskás	Marcell Boros	Kevin Kiss	Ábel Váradi

== Series 12 (2024) ==
=== Contestants ===
Key:

– Winner
– Runner-Up
– Third Place

Mentor	Acts		
Laci Gáspár	Roland Sárközi	Bence Szabó	Sándor Toldi
Milán Valkusz	Krisztián Fehér	Henn	Steve Major
Andi Tóth	Zsombor Kundra	Monica Pike	Nóra Zilincki
Péter Majoros	Éberkóma	Koren	Vivien Miklós

== Series 13 (2025) ==
=== Contestants ===
Key:

– Winner
– Runner-Up
– Third Place

Mentor	Acts			
Laci Gáspár	Lil Davis	LilyZ	Nazyra	
Milán Valkusz	Balla Béla	CFL	Dea Kollár	
Andi Tóth	Belano	Márkó Istenes	Anett Mohácsi	Anna Patai
Péter Majoros	Ancsi Farkas	Tonix Honix	Imi Varga	

== Series averages ==
Series	Series premiere	Series finale	Episodes (inc. results shows)	Average Hungary viewers in millions (inc. results shows)
Series 1	28 August 2010	19 December 2010	19	2.26
Series 2	3 September 2011	18 December 2011	19	2.13
Series 3	1 September 2012	16 December 2012	19	2.09
Series 4	7 September 2013	15 December 2013	28	1.89
Series 5	6 September 2014	21 December 2014	19	1.44
Series 6	24 September 2016	17 December 2016	15	1.06
Series 7	2 September 2017	25 November 2017	15	0.79
Series 8	6 October 2018	15 December 2018	13	1.10
Series 9	5 October 2019	14 December 2019	13	1.08
Series 10	9 October 2021	18 December 2021	13	0.92
Series 11	3 September 2022	19 November 2022	13	0.74
Series 12	7 September 2024	7 December 2024	15	
