= Vastag =

Vastag or Vaștag is a surname. Notable people with the surname include:

- Andrei Vaștag (born 1994), Romanian footballer, son of Francisc Vaștag (see below)
- Csaba Vastag (born 1982), Hungarian musician
- Francisc Vaștag (born 1969), Romanian boxer
- Tamás Vastag (born 1991), Hungarian singer

== See also ==
- Vastagh
