= X-Faktor series 3 =

X-Faktor
- Series 3
- Hosted by: Nóra Ördög
- Judges: Feró Nagy; Ildikó Keresztes; Miklós Malek; Péter Geszti
- Winner: Gergő Oláh
- Winning mentor: Péter Geszti
- Runner-up: Tímea Antal

Release
- Original network: RTL Klub
- Original release: 1 September – 16 December 2012

Series chronology
- ← Previous; Series 2 Next → Series 4

This is the third season of Hungarian version of The X Factor.

The first promo for applying was broadcast in April, 2012. Nóra Ördög returned to host the show. RTL KLUB confirmed the judges on 25 June, all of the four judges would be back for season 3. The show started the Fall of 2012. The producers promised it would be the best and the biggest season of the show. In this series the production used the new X Faktor logo and styling and also changed the judges place on the panel.

First time it would be the rival show of TV2 (Hungary)'s Voice. The Voice would be a real rival, because Miklós Malek's sister Andrea Malek was joining to the Voice's line up. X Faktor is the most viewed talent show in Hungarian TV history.

The first promo was aired on 9 August. The channel announced 16 August, that X-Faktor would return on 1 September 2012.

== Auditions ==
The auditions started in the summer of 2012, with more than 5,000 candidates for the third series in Hungary. The judges auditions took place in Budapest on 25–28 June. This is the first time when the judges' auditions take more than one day.

== Bootcamp ==
The Bootcamp stage of the show also took place in Budapest. Some 130 acts were invited for singing. The taping of the session started 16 July, and finished 20 July. One of the judges Ildikó Keresztes, said it was a really hard, but also a really dramatic Bootcamp. The Bootcamp was aired on 29 and 30 September. On the first day the 130 hopefuls sang a song in groups. The songs were chosen by the judges. At the end of the day 30 acts were sent home. On the second day, the contestants has a dance lesson, the judges saw the rehearsal, and after that the contestants of the four category (Girls, Boys, Groups and Over 28s) made a presentation of their dancing knowledge. At the end of the day, the judges revealed the 50 acts, who went through for the last day of the Bootcamp. On the third day, the contestantas sang live for an audience and the judges. The hopefuls chose a song, what they wanted to sing. At the end of the day, the judges revealed the 25 remaining acts for the Judges' Homes. the girls category has an extra, 7th acts. And the judges find out, which category will they mentoring.

== Judges' houses ==
At this stage of the competition each judge mentored six acts. Each judge had help from a guest judge to choose their final acts. Keresztes was helped by Balázs Fehér, Malek by Gabi Tóth, Nagy by Tamás Molnár, and Geszti by Titusz Tiszttartó. Contestants performed one song for their respective judge. Each judge and their guest eliminated three acts, leaving twelve remaining. The judges' houses stage was broadcast in two episodes on 6 and 7 October 2012.

The thirteen eliminated acts were:

- Boys: Emota Bálint Ekanem, Csaba Meggyes, Szilárd Nagy
- Girls: Réka Balla, Dóra Danics, Kinga Jáger, Loretta Pál
- Over 28s: Sándor Horváth, Zsolt Ernő Kiss, Erika Kovács
- Groups: ByTheWay, Soldiers, Wonderfool

== Contestants ==
Twelve acts go through to this stage of the show.

Key:

– Winner
– Runner-up
– Third Place

Category (mentor)	Acts		
Boys (Geszti)	Zoltán Fehér	Gergő Oláh	Dávid Szabó
Girls (Malek)	Tímea Antal	Adél Csobot	Andrea Kvaka
Over 28s (Keresztes)	László Kovács	Bea Lass	Krisztián Zámbó
Groups (Nagy)	Like	P.J.Z.	Spirit

== Results summary ==
– mentored by Miklós Malek (Girls)	– Bottom two
– mentored by Péter Geszti (Boys)	– Most public votes that week
– mentored by Feró Nagy (Groups)
– mentored by Ildikó Keresztes (Over 28s)

	Week 1	Week 2	Week 3	Week 4	Week 5	Week 6	Week 7	Week 8	Week 9	Final Week 10	
	Week 1	Week 2	Week 3	Week 4	Week 5	Week 6	Week 7	Week 8	Week 9	Round 1	Round 2
Gergő Oláh	1st 30.27%	1st 35.24%	1st 37.89%	1st 31.85%	1st 34.35%	1st 36.57%	1st 38.01%	1st 33.42%	1st 38.23%	1st 46.66%	1st 50.56%
Tímea Antal	3rd 11.79%	2nd 12.69%	2nd 13.08%	4th 12.52%	4th 10.20%	2nd 22.36%	2nd 20.63%	2nd 27.19%	2nd 29.82%	2nd 31.95%	2nd 49.44%
Adél Csobot	2nd 11.98%	4th 11.15%	3rd 12.80%	2nd 13.92%	2nd 14.13%	3rd 13.82%	3rd 14.82%	3rd 15.09%	3rd 17.77%	3rd 21.39%	Eliminated (Week 10)
Dávid Szabó	5th 8.49%	8th 4.56%	8th 4.21%	7th 5.66%	5th 8.25%	6th 6.19%	4th 11.87%	4th 15.00%	4th 14.17%	Eliminated (Week 9)	
László Kovács	7th 5.64%	6th 5.92%	7th 4,52%	8th 4.24%	8th 7.13%	5th 6.61%	6th 5.31%	5th 9.29%	Eliminated (Week 8)		
Krisztián Zámbó	4th 10.35%	3rd 11.96%	4th 9.00%	3rd 13.82%	3rd 10.69%	4th 8.76%	5th 9.36%	Eliminated (Week 7)			
Like	8th 3.89%	5th 5.95%	6th 4.78%	6th 5.85%	6th 8.09%	7th 5.70%	Eliminated (Week 6)				
Zoltán Fehér	11th 2.41%	7th 4.60%	10th 3.17%	5th 8.02%	7th 7.17%	Eliminated (Week 5)					
Bea Lass	10th 2.81%	11th 1.46%	5th 7.03%	9th 4.12%	Eliminated (Week 4)						
Spirit	6th 6.27%	9th 3.38%	9th 3.52%	Eliminated (Week 3)							
P.J.Z.	9th 3.89%	10th 3.11%	Eliminated (Week 2)								
Andrea Kvaka	12th 2.21%	Eliminated (Week 1)									
Bottom Two	Zoltán Fehér, Andrea Kvaka	P.J.Z., Bea Lass	Spirit, Zoltán Fehér	László Kovács, Bea Lass	László Kovács, Zoltán Fehér	Like, Dávid Szabó	László Kovács, Krisztián Zámbó	László Kovács, Dávid Szabó	Adél Csobot, Dávid Szabó	No judges' vote or final showdown: public votes alone decide who is eliminated and who ultimately wins	
Geszti's vote to eliminate	Andrea Kvaka	P.J.Z.	Spirit	László Kovács	László Kovács	Like	Krisztián Zámbó	László Kovács	Adél Csobot	No judges' vote or final showdown: public votes alone decide who is eliminated and who ultimately wins	
Keresztes's vote to eliminate	Andrea Kvaka	P.J.Z.	Spirit	László Kovács	Zoltán Fehér	Like	-	Dávid Szabó	Adél Csobot	No judges' vote or final showdown: public votes alone decide who is eliminated and who ultimately wins	
Malek's vote to eliminate	Zoltán Fehér	P.J.Z.	Spirit	Bea Lass	Zoltán Fehér	Like	Krisztián Zámbó	László Kovács	Dávid Szabó	No judges' vote or final showdown: public votes alone decide who is eliminated and who ultimately wins	
Nagy's vote to eliminate	Andrea Kvaka	Bea Lass	Zoltán Fehér	Bea Lass	Zoltán Fehér	Dávid Szabó	Krisztián Zámbó	László Kovács	Dávid Szabó	No judges' vote or final showdown: public votes alone decide who is eliminated and who ultimately wins	
Eliminated	Andrea Kvaka; 3 from 4 votes Majority	P.J.Z. 3 from 4 votes Majority	Spirit; 3 from 4 votes Majority	Bea Lass; 2 from 4 votes Deadlock	Zoltán Fehér; 3 from 4 votes Majority	Like; 3 from 4 votes Majority	Krisztián Zámbó; 3 from 3 votes Majority	László Kovács; 3 from 4 votes Majority	Dávid Szabó; 2 from 4 votes Deadlock	Adél Csobot; 3rd Place	Tímea Antal; 2nd Place
Eliminated	Andrea Kvaka; 3 from 4 votes Majority	P.J.Z. 3 from 4 votes Majority	Spirit; 3 from 4 votes Majority	Bea Lass; 2 from 4 votes Deadlock	Zoltán Fehér; 3 from 4 votes Majority	Like; 3 from 4 votes Majority	Krisztián Zámbó; 3 from 3 votes Majority	László Kovács; 3 from 4 votes Majority	Dávid Szabó; 2 from 4 votes Deadlock	Adél Csobot; 3rd Place	Gergő Oláh; 1st Place

== Live Shows ==
=== Week 1 (13 October) ===
- Theme: Songs chosen by the contestants

A summary of the contestants' performances on the first live show and results show, along with the results.
Act	Order	Song	Result
P.J.Z.	1	"Let's Get It Started"	Safe
Andrea Kvaka	2	"Sweet Child o' Mine"	Bottom two
Zoltán Fehér	3	"Don't Let the Sun Go Down on Me"	Bottom two
László Kovács	4	"Nem vagyok tökéletes"	Safe
Tímea Antal	5	"All the Man That I Need"	Safe
Like	6	"Stronger (What Doesn't Kill You)"	Safe
Krisztián Zámbó	7	"Incomplete"	Safe
Spirit	8	"We Are Young"	Safe
Gergő Oláh	9	"Runaway Baby"	Safe
Adél Csobot	10	"Back It Up"	Safe
Dávid Szabó	11	"Hero"	Safe
Bea Lass	12	"Speechless"	Safe
Final showdown details
Zoltán Fehér	1	"Mondd, mit tegyek, hogy érezd?"	Safe
Andrea Kvaka	2	"Végső vallomás "	Eliminated

Judge's vote to eliminate

- Nagy: Andrea Kvaka
- Malek: Zoltán Fehér
- Keresztes: Andrea Kvaka
- Geszti: Andrea Kvaka

=== Week 2 (20 October) ===
A summary of the contestants' performances on the second live show and results show, along with the results.
Act	Order	Song	Result
Bea Lass	1	"Get the Party Started"	Bottom two
Spirit	2	"Save the World"	Safe
Tímea Antal	3	"Euphoria"	Safe
Dávid Szabó	4	"Rock DJ"	Safe
László Kovács	5	"Hello"	Safe
P.J.Z.	6	"I Love Rock 'n' Roll"	Bottom two
Zoltán Fehér	7	"When I Get You Alone"	Safe
Like	8	"Stay"	Safe
Krisztián Zámbó	9	"Harc és vágy"	Safe
Adél Csobot	10	"Call Me Maybe"	Safe
Gergő Oláh	11	"It's a Man's Man's Man's World"	Safe
Final showdown details
P.J.Z.	1	"Love the Way You Lie"	Eliminated
Bea Lass	2	"Egészen, mert félig nem tudok"	Safe

Judge's vote to eliminate

- Geszti: P.J.Z.
- Malek: P.J.Z.
- Keresztes: P.J.Z.
- Nagy: Lass Bea

=== Week 3 (27 October) ===
- Theme: Movie themes

A summary of the contestants' performances on the third live show and results show, along with the results.
Act	Order	Song	Result
Krisztián Zámbó	1	"GoldenEye"	Safe
Adél Csobot	2	"Hanky Panky"	Safe
Bea Lass	3	"Bang Bang (My Baby Shot Me Down)"	Safe
Zoltán Fehér	4	"Licence to Kill"	Bottom two
Spirit	5	"Tainted Love"	Bottom two
Dávid Szabó	6	"Millennium"	Safe
László Kovács	7	"You Know My Name"	Safe
Gergő Oláh	8	"If I Only Knew"	Safe
Tímea Antal	9	"Empire State of Mind (Part II) Broken Down"	Safe
Like	10	"Live and Let Die"	Safe
Final showdown details
Spirit	1	"Csepp a tengerben"	Eliminated
Zoltán Fehér	2	"Valahol elrontottam"	Safe

Judge's vote to eliminate

- Malek: Spirit
- Geszti: Spirit
- Nagy: Zoltán Fehér
- Keresztes: Spirit

=== Week 4 (3 November) ===
- Theme: Life is beautiful

A summary of the contestants' performances on the fourth live show and results show, along with the results.
Act	Order	Song	Result
László Kovács	1	"Mid nem voltam még neked"	Bottom two
Like	2	"California King Bed"	Safe
Dávid Szabó	3	"Csillagok"	Safe
Bea Lass	4	"A szerelem sivataga"	Bottom two
Zoltán Fehér	5	"Marry You"	Safe
Tímea Antal	6	"A szerelem fáj"	Safe
Gergő Oláh	7	"Hall of Fame"	Safe
Krisztián Zámbó	8	"Dance with My Father"	Safe
Adél Csobot	9	"99 Red Balloons"	Safe
Final showdown details
László Kovács	1	"Utolsó érintés"	Safe
Bea Lass	2	"Vadvirág"	Eliminated

Judge's vote to eliminate

- Malek: Bea Lass
- Geszti: László Kovács
- Nagy: Bea Lass
- Keresztes: László Kovács

As both Acts got 2 Votes, they went to deadlock and Bea Lass was eliminated.

=== Week 5 (10 November) ===
A summary of the contestants' performances on the fifth live show and results show, along with the results.
Act	Order	Song	Result
Dávid Szabó	1	"Fairytale"	Safe
Krisztián Zámbó	2	"Keep the Faith"	Safe
Adél Csobot	3	"Eternal Flame"	Safe
László Kovács	4	"Vágtass velem! (Kő kövön...)"	Bottom two
Tímea Antal	5	"Behind These Hazel Eyes"	Safe
Zoltán Fehér	6	"Bennünk a világ"	Bottom two
Gergő Oláh	7	"Too Close"	Safe
Like	8	"Ez az a perc"	Safe
Final showdown details
Zoltán Fehér	1	"Mondd, miért fáj ugyanúgy?"	Eliminated
László Kovács	2	"Érints meg"	Safe

Judge's vote to eliminate

- Geszti: László Kovács
- Keresztes: Zoltán Fehér
- Nagy: Zoltán Fehér
- Malek: Zoltán Fehér

=== Week 6 (17 November) ===
A summary of the contestants' performances on the sixth live show and results show, along with the results.
Act	Order	Song	Result
Like	1	"I'll Be There for You"	Bottom two
László Kovács	2	"Soha még"	Safe
Dávid Szabó	3	"Kerek egész"	Bottom two
Tímea Antal	4	"Over the Rainbow"	Safe
Krisztián Zámbó	5	"Hagyd meg nekem a dalt"	Safe
Adél Csobot	6	"Fekete rúzs"	Safe
Gergő Oláh	7	"Wild Wild West"	Safe
Final showdown details
Dávid Szabó	1	"The Climb"	Safe
Like	2	"Russian Roulette"	Eliminated

Judge's vote to eliminate

- Geszti: Like
- Keresztes: Like
- Nagy: Dávid Szabó
- Malek: Like

=== Week 7 (24 November) ===
A summary of the contestants' performances on the seventh live show and results show, along with the results.
Act	Order	Song	Result
László Kovács	1	"Pancsoló kislány"	Bottom two
Adél Csobot	2	"Mama"	Safe
Gergő Oláh	3	"Szállj fel magasra!"	Safe
Krisztián Zámbó	4	"Sorry Seems to Be the Hardest Word"	Bottom two
Tímea Antal	5	"Domino"	Safe
Dávid Szabó	6	"(Everything I Do) I Do It for You"	Safe
Duet
Tímea Antal & Dávid Szabó	1	"Moves like Jagger"	
Krisztián Zámbó & László Kovács	2	"Feketén a hófehér"	
Adél Csobot & Gergő Oláh	3	"The Way You Make Me Feel"	
Final showdown details
László Kovács	1	"November"	Safe
Krisztián Zámbó	2	"Még nem veszíthetek"	Eliminated

Judge's vote to eliminate

- Geszti: Krisztián Zámbó
- Keresztes: no need to vote
- Nagy: Krisztián Zámbó
- Malek: Krisztián Zámbó

=== Week 8 (1 December) ===
- Theme: One English song & One Hungarian song

A summary of the contestants' performances on the eighth live show and results show, along with the results.
Act	Order	First song	Order	Second song	Result
Gergő Oláh	1	"The Other Side"	6	"Nagy utazás"	Safe
Adél Csobot	2	"Például te"	7	"The Loco-Motion"	Safe
László Kovács	3	"Mindenki valakié"	8	"Send Me an Angel"	Bottom two
Dávid Szabó	4	"Livin' la Vida Loca"	10	"Hogyan tudnék élni nélküled"	Bottom two
Tímea Antal	5	"Ez a vonat, ha elindult, hadd menjen..."	9	"Crazy in Love"/"Crazy"	Safe
Final showdown details
László Kovács	1	"Hol van a szó"			Eliminated
Dávid Szabó	2	"Eskünk"			Safe

Judge's vote to eliminate

- Geszti: László Kovács
- Keresztes: Dávid Szabó
- Nagy: László Kovács
- Malek: László Kovács

=== Week 9 (8 December) ===
- Theme: One English song & One Hungarian song

A summary of the contestants' performances on the ninth live show and results show, along with the results.
Act	Order	First song	Order	Second song	Result
Adél Csobot	1	"Szívemben bomba van"/"Sohase mondd"	6	"Imagine"	Bottom two
Gergő Oláh	2	"Tartozom"	5	"Don't Stop Me Now"	Safe
Dávid Szabó	3	"Circle of Life"	7	"Megtalállak még"/"A zene kísér majd az úton"	Bottom two
Tímea Antal	4	"Szerelem, miért múlsz?"	8	"All by Myself"	Safe
Final showdown details
Dávid Szabó	1	"Valahol"			Eliminated
Adél Csobot	2	"My Funny Valentine"			Safe

Judge's vote to eliminate

- Geszti: Adél Csobot
- Keresztes: Adél Csobot
- Nagy: Dávid Szabó
- Malek: Dávid Szabó

As both Acts got 2 Votes, they went to deadlock and Dávid Szabó was eliminated.

=== Week 10 (15/16 December) ===
==== Saturday Night ====
- Theme: One with a surprise duet partner
- Duets:
  - Tímea Antal and Tibor Kasza
  - Gergő Oláh and Bebe
  - Adél Csobot and Bery

A summary of the contestants' performances on the tenth live show and results show, along with the results.
Act	Order	First song	Order	Second song	Order	Third song	Result
Tímea Antal	1	"Mercy"	4	"Amíg csak élek"	7	"Run to You"	Safe
Gergő Oláh	2	"Part-Time Lover"	5	"Tevagyazakitalegjobban"	8	"Billie Jean"	Safe
Adél Csobot	3	"That Man"	6	"Egyedül"	9	"What a Wonderful World"	3rd

==== Sunday Night ====
- Theme: Finalist's favourite previously performed song, one with a surprise duet partner, Winner Song
- Duets:
  - Tímea Antal and Tibor Kocsis
  - Gergő Oláh and Csaba Vastag

A summary of the contestants' performances on the finals and results show, along with the results.
Act	Order	First song	Order	Second song	Order	Third song	Result
Gergő Oláh	1	"It's a Man's Man's Man's World"	3	"Őrizd az álmod"	5	"Törj ki a csendből!"	Winner
Tímea Antal	2	"Over the Rainbow"	4	"Lásd a csodát"	6	"Törj ki a csendből!"	Runner-Up
