= X-Faktor series 1 =

X-Faktor
- Series 1
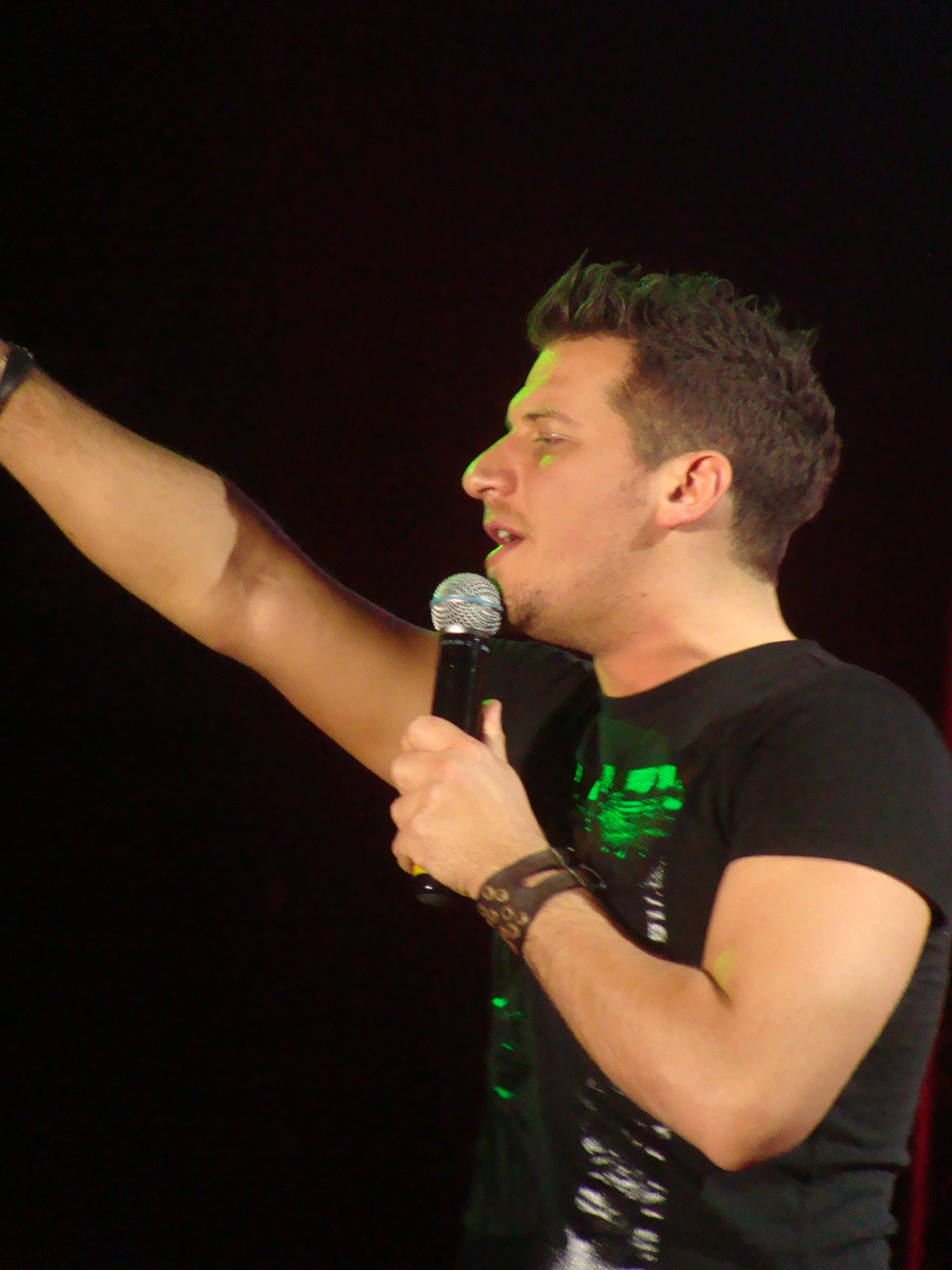
- Csaba Vastag the winner
- Hosted by: Nóra Ördög; Balázs Sebestyén
- Judges: Péter Geszti; Ildikó Keresztes; Miklós Malek; Feró Nagy
- Winner: Csaba Vastag
- Winning mentor: Feró Nagy
- Runner-up: Nikolas Takács

Release
- Original network: RTL Klub
- Original release: 28 August – 19 December 2010

Series chronology
- Next → Series 2

The show's inaugural Hungarian season ended on 19 December 2010. Csaba Vastag was announced as the winner. It was broadcast on the commercial RTL Klub television station.

== Auditions ==
The auditions started in the summer of 2010, with more than 5,000 candidates for the first series in Hungary.

== Bootcamp ==
The Bootcamp was in the Thalia Theatre where 150 singers competed. In the first round the contestants sang a song of their choice. The judges immediately told the contestants if they were safe or not. In the second round only 50 contestants competed and they chose a song for themselves from a list. After this, based on the judges decision 24 contestants went to the third round called "Judge's houses".

== Judge's houses ==
At this stage of the competition each judge mentored six acts. Each judge had help from a guest judge to choose their final acts. Keresztes was helped by Zoltán Ádok, Malek by his sister Andrea Malek, Nagy by Dániel Abebe, and Geszti by Mariann Falusi. Contestants performed one song for their respective judge. Each judge and their guest eliminated three acts, leaving twelve remaining. The judges' houses stage was broadcast in two episodes on 9 and 10 October 2010.

The twelve eliminated acts were:

- Boys: Dávid Hegyi, Teó Spiriev, Előd Szabó
- Girls: Enikő Muri, Katica Németh, Dzsenifer Szirota
- Over 25s: Kriszta Bakó, Dávid Nádor, Zsolt Wittmann
- Groups: Conformity, Karma, Nóra Réder és Kádár Szabolcs

== Contestants ==
The top twelve acts were confirmed as follows: The following artists made it to the live shows.

Key:

– Winner
– Runner-up
– Third place

Category (mentor)	Acts		
Boys (Keresztes)	Norbi L. Király	Nikolas Takács	Tamás Vastag
Girls (Geszti)	Fanni Domokos	Veca Janicsák	Dorka Shodeinde
Over 25s (Nagy)	Mariann Szabó	Csaba Vastag	Kati Wolf
Groups (Malek)	Mimi és Gergő	Non Stop	Summer Sisters

== Results summary ==
– mentored by Péter Geszti (Girls)	– Bottom two
– mentored by Ildikó Keresztes (Boys)	– Safe
– mentored by Miklós Malek (Groups)
– mentored by Feró Nagy (Over 25s)

	Week 1	Week 2	Week 3	Week 4	Week 5	Week 6	Week 7	Week 8	Week 9	Final Week 10	
	Week 1	Week 2	Week 3	Week 4	Week 5	Week 6	Week 7	Week 8	Week 9	Round 1	Round 2
Csaba Vastag	Safe	Safe	Safe	Safe	Safe	Safe	Safe	Bottom two	3rd	Safe	WINNER (1st Place)
Nikolas Takács	Safe	Safe	Safe	Safe	Bottom two	Safe	5th	Safe	Safe	Safe	RUNNER-UP (2nd Place)
Norbi L. Király	Safe	Safe	Safe	Safe	Safe	Safe	Safe	Safe	Safe	3rd	Eliminated (Week 10)
Veca Janicsák	Safe	Safe	Bottom two	Safe	Safe	Safe	Safe	Safe	4th	Eliminated (Week 9)	
Tamás Vastag	Safe	Safe	Safe	Safe	Safe	6th	Safe	Bottom two	Eliminated (Week 8)		
Kati Wolf	Safe	Safe	Safe	Safe	Safe	Safe	6th	Eliminated (Week 7)			
Dorka Shodeinde	Safe	Safe	Safe	8th	Safe	7th	Eliminated (Week 6)				
Non Stop	Safe	Safe	Safe	Safe	Bottom two	Eliminated (Week 5)					
Mariann Szabó	Bottom two	Safe	Safe	9th	Eliminated (Week 4)						
Summer Sisters	Safe	Bottom two	Bottom two	Eliminated (Week 3)							
Fanni Domokos	Safe	Bottom two	Eliminated (Week 2)								
Mimi és Gergő	Bottom two	Eliminated (Week 1)									
Bottom two	Mimi és Gergő, Mariann Szabó	Fanni Domokos, Summer Sisters	Summer Sisters, Veca Janicsák	Mariann Szabó, Dorka Shodeinde	Nikolas Takács, Non Stop	Tamás Vastag, Dorka Shodeinde	Nikolas Takács, Kati Wolf	Tamás Vastag, Csaba Vastag	Veca Janicsák, Csaba Vastag	No judges' vote or final showdown: public votes alone decide who is eliminated and who ultimately wins	
Geszti's vote to eliminate	Mimi és Gergő	Summer Sisters	Summer Sisters	Mariann Szabó	Non Stop	Tamás Vastag	Kati Wolf	Tamás Vastag	Csaba Vastag	No judges' vote or final showdown: public votes alone decide who is eliminated and who ultimately wins	
Keresztes's vote to eliminate	Mimi és Gergő	Fanni Domokos	Summer Sisters	Dorka Shodeinde	Non Stop	Dorka Shodeinde	Kati Wolf	Csaba Vastag	Veca Janicsák	No judges' vote or final showdown: public votes alone decide who is eliminated and who ultimately wins	
Malek's vote to eliminate	Mariann Szabó	Fanni Domokos	Veca Janicsák	Mariann Szabó	Nikolas Takács	Dorka Shodeinde	Nikolas Takács	Tamás Vastag	Csaba Vastag	No judges' vote or final showdown: public votes alone decide who is eliminated and who ultimately wins	
Nagy's vote to eliminate	Mimi és Gergő	Fanni Domokos	Summer Sisters	Dorka Shodeinde	Non Stop	Tamás Vastag	Nikolas Takács	Tamás Vastag	Veca Janicsák	No judges' vote or final showdown: public votes alone decide who is eliminated and who ultimately wins	
Eliminated	Mimi és Gergő; 3 from 4 votes Majority	Fanni Domokos; 3 from 4 votes Majority	Summer Sisters; 3 from 4 votes Majority	Mariann Szabó; 2 from 4 votes Deadlock	Non Stop; 3 from 4 votes Majority	Dorka Shodeinde; 2 from 4 votes Deadlock	Kati Wolf; 2 from 4 votes Deadlock	Tamás Vastag; 3 from 4 votes Majority	Veca Janicsák; 2 from 4 votes Deadlock	Norbi L. Király; 3rd Place	Nikolas Takács; 2nd Place
Eliminated	Mimi és Gergő; 3 from 4 votes Majority	Fanni Domokos; 3 from 4 votes Majority	Summer Sisters; 3 from 4 votes Majority	Mariann Szabó; 2 from 4 votes Deadlock	Non Stop; 3 from 4 votes Majority	Dorka Shodeinde; 2 from 4 votes Deadlock	Kati Wolf; 2 from 4 votes Deadlock	Tamás Vastag; 3 from 4 votes Majority	Veca Janicsák; 2 from 4 votes Deadlock	Norbi L. Király; 3rd Place	Csaba Vastag; 1st Place

== Live shows ==
=== Week 1 (16 October) ===
- Theme: 21st century
- Celebrity performer: Viktor Varga ("Lehet zöld az ég")
- Group performance: "És megindul a föld"

A summary of the contestants' performances on the first live show and results show, along with the results.
Act	Order	Song	Result
Mariann Szabó	1	"So What"	Bottom two
Tamás Vastag	2	"Come Undone"	Safe
Non Stop	3	"Bad Romance"	Safe
Veca Janicsák	4	"If I Ain't Got You"	Safe
Dorka Shodeinde	5	"Halo"	Safe
Csaba Vastag	6	"Wherever You Will Go"	Safe
Norbi L. Király	7	"All Summer Long"	Safe
Mimi és Gergő	8	"No Air"	Bottom two
Fanni Domokos	9	"Hot n Cold"	Safe
Kati Wolf	10	"From Sarah with Love"	Safe
Nikolas Takács	11	"Crazy"	Safe
Summer Sisters	12	"Hush Hush"	Safe
Final showdown details
Mimi és Gergő	1	"Trambulin"	Eliminated
Mariann Szabó	2	"With or Without You"	Safe

Judge's vote to eliminate

- Nagy: Mimi és Gergő
- Malek: Mariann Szabó
- Keresztes: Mimi és Gergő
- Geszti: Mimi és Gergő

=== Week 2 (23 October) ===
- Theme: Divas and Heartbreakers
- Celebrity performer: Zséda ("És megindul a föld" / "A skorpió hava" / "Rám valahol egy férfi vár")
- Group performance: "Ha lemegy a Nap"

A summary of the contestants' performances on the second live show and results show, along with the results.
Act	Order	Song	Result
Kati Wolf	1	"Hot Stuff"	Safe
Fanni Domokos	2	"Torn"	Bottom two
Tamás Vastag	3	"Back for Good"	Safe
Non Stop	4	"4 Minutes"	Safe
Veca Janicsák	5	"I'm Every Woman"	Safe
Csaba Vastag	6	"Keresem az utam"	Safe
Summer Sisters	7	"Can't Fight the Moonlight"	Bottom two
Norbi L. Király	8	"Lady"	Safe
Dorka Shodeinde	9	"Boldogság gyere haza"	Safe
Mariann Szabó	10	"Paid My Dues"	Safe
Nikolas Takács	11	"And I Am Telling You I'm Not Going"	Safe
Final showdown details
Fanni Domokos	1	"One Day in Your Life"	Eliminated
Summer Sisters	2	"One Moment in Time"	Safe

Judge's vote to eliminate

- Geszti: Summer Sisters
- Malek: Fanni Domokos
- Keresztes: Fanni Domokos
- Nagy: Fanni Domokos

=== Week 3 (30 October) ===
- Theme: Rock songs
- Celebrity performer: Gabi Tóth ("Elég volt")
- Group performance: "Ha zene szól"

A summary of the contestants' performances on the third live show and results show, along with the results.
Act	Order	Song	Result
Csaba Vastag	1	"It's My Life"	Safe
Summer Sisters	2	"You Shook Me All Night Long"	Bottom two
Nikolas Takács	3	"Purple Rain"	Safe
Non Stop	4	"Eye of the Tiger"	Safe
Veca Janicsák	5	"Fighter"	Bottom two
Mariann Szabó	6	"The Pretender"	Safe
Norbi L. Király	7	"Addicted to Love"	Safe
Tamás Vastag	8	"Kölyköd voltam"	Safe
Kati Wolf	9	"Bring Me to Life"	Safe
Dorka Shodeinde	10	"Every Breath You Take"	Safe
Final showdown details
Summer Sisters	1	"The Greatest Love of All"	Eliminated
Veca Janicsák	2	"I Have Nothing"	Safe

Judge's vote to eliminate

- Malek: Veca Janicsák
- Geszti: Summer Sisters
- Nagy: Summer Sisters
- Keresztes: Summer Sisters

=== Week 4 (6 November) ===
- Theme: Movie themes
- Celebrity performer: Anti Fitness Club ("Sohase mondd")
- Group performance: "Tépj szét"

A summary of the contestants' performances on the fourth live show and results show, along with the results.
Act	Order	Song	Result
Norbi L. Király	1	"Big Gun"	Safe
Mariann Szabó	2	"GoldenEye"	Bottom two
Dorka Shodeinde	3	"All I Want for Christmas Is You"	Bottom two
Tamás Vastag	4	"Hero"	Safe
Non Stop	5	Cartoon themes medley	Safe
Kati Wolf	6	"Kiss From a Rose"	Safe
Csaba Vastag	7	"Tégy csodát!"	Safe
Nikolas Takács	8	"Ain't No Mountain High Enough"	Safe
Veca Janicsák	9	"I Will Always Love You"	Safe
Final showdown details
Mariann Szabó	1	"The Silence"	Eliminated
Dorka Shodeinde	2	"Without You"	Safe

Judge's vote to eliminate

- Malek: Mariann Szabó
- Geszti: Mariann Szabó
- Nagy: Dorka Shodeinde
- Keresztes: Dorka Shodeinde

=== Week 5 (13 November) ===
- Theme: Songs from the toplists
- Celebrity performer: Back II Black ("Úgy vártalak" / "Tevagyazakitalegjobban" / "Nánénáné")
- Group performance: "Gyere kislány, gyere" and "8 óra munka"

A summary of the contestants' performances on the fifth live show and results show, along with the results.
Act	Order	Song	Result
Nikolas Takács	1	"Little L"	Bottom two
Veca Janicsák	2	"Ha volna két életem"	Safe
Dorka Shodeinde	3	"Killing Me Softly"	Safe
Csaba Vastag	4	"Sex Bomb"	Safe
Norbi L. Király	5	"Nézz az ég felé"	Safe
Kati Wolf	6	"As"	Safe
Non Stop	7	"Don't Stop the Music"	Bottom two
Tamás Vastag	8	"When You Say Nothing at All"	Safe
Final showdown details
Nikolas Takács	1	"Akad, amit nem gyógyít meg az idő sem"	Safe
Non Stop	2	"Proud Mary"	Eliminated

Judge's vote to eliminate

- Keresztes: Non Stop
- Malek: Nikolas Takács
- Nagy: Non Stop
- Geszti: Non Stop

=== Week 6 (20 November) ===
- Theme: Party anthems
- Celebrity performer: András Csonka ("Ding-Dong")
- Group performance: "Ezt egy életen át kell játszani"

A summary of the contestants' performances on the sixth live show and results show, along with the results.
Act	Order	Song	Result
Dorka Shodeinde	1	"I Wanna Dance with Somebody (Who Loves Me)"	Bottom two
Nikolas Takács	2	"If You Don't Know Me by Now"	Safe
Kati Wolf	3	"When Love Takes Over"	Safe
Tamás Vastag	4	"Uptown Girl"	Bottom two
Veca Janicsák	5	"Szerelem első vérig"	Safe
Norbi L. Király	6	"(Your Love Keeps Lifting Me) Higher and Higher"	Safe
Csaba Vastag	7	"Reality"	Safe
Final showdown details
Tamás Vastag	1	"Losing My Religion"	Safe
Dorka Shodeinde	2	"Love You I Do"	Eliminated

Judge's vote to eliminate

- Geszti: Tamás Vastag
- Keresztes: Dorka Shodeinde
- Malek: Dorka Shodeinde
- Nagy: Tamás Vastag

=== Week 7 (27 November) ===
- Theme: One-hit Wonders
- Celebrity performer: Up! ("Süt a Nap" / "Mindenki táncoljon"), Adrien Szekeres ("Olyan, mint Te")
- Group performance: "Megtalállak"

A summary of the contestants' performances on the seventh live show and results show, along with the results.
Act	Order	Song	Result
Norbi L. Király	1	"Cotton-Eyed Joe"	Safe
Csaba Vastag	2	"You"	Safe
Veca Janicsák	3	"Nothing Compares 2 U"	Safe
Nikolas Takács	4	"Shackles (Praise You)"	Bottom two
Kati Wolf	5	"Un-Break My Heart"	Bottom two
Tamás Vastag	6	"Bad Day"	Safe
Final showdown details
Nikolas Takács	1	"Yesterday"	Safe
Kati Wolf	2	"Saving All My Love for You"	Eliminated

Judge's vote to eliminate

- Keresztes: Kati Wolf
- Nagy: Nikolas Takács
- Malek: Nikolas Takács
- Geszti: Kati Wolf

=== Week 8 (4 December) ===
- Theme: One Hungarian and one English song
- Celebrity performer: Zoltán Bereczki ("Szállj velem")
- Group performance: "Színezd újra!"

A summary of the contestants' performances on the eighth live show and results show, along with the results.
Act	Order	First song	Order	Second song	Result
Nikolas Takács	1	"Boogie Wonderland"	6	"A boldogság és én"	Safe
Norbi L. Király	2	"Örökké tart"	7	"Let's Get Rocked"	Safe
Tamás Vastag	3	"Érezd magad jól"	8	"Tears in Heaven"	Bottom two
Csaba Vastag	4	"What a Wonderful World"	9	"Királylány"	Bottom two
Veca Janicsák	5	"Bad Boys"	10	"Most múlik pontosan"	Safe
Final showdown details
Tamás Vastag	1	"You Raise Me Up"			Eliminated
Csaba Vastag	2	"Jégszív"			Safe

Judge's vote to eliminate

- Keresztes: Csaba Vastag
- Nagy: Tamás Vastag
- Geszti: Tamás Vastag
- Malek: Tamás Vastag

=== Week 9 (11 December) ===
- Theme: One Hungarian and one English song
- Celebrity performer: Ákos ("A fénybe nézz")
- Group performance: "Bennünk a világ"

A summary of the contestants' performances on the ninth live show and results show, along with the results.
Act	Order	First song	Order	Second song	Result
Csaba Vastag	1	"Keserű méz"	5	"You Are So Beautiful"	Bottom two
Veca Janicsák	2	"Kell ott fenn egy ország"	6	"Crazy"	Bottom two
Nikolas Takács	3	"Billie Jean"	7	"Maradj velem"	Safe
Norbi L. Király	4	"Legyen valami"	8	"Nutbush City Limits"	Safe
Final showdown details
Veca Janicsák	1	"Listen"			Eliminated
Csaba Vastag	2	"This is the Moment"			Safe

Judge's vote to eliminate

- Geszti: Csaba Vastag
- Nagy: Veca Janicsák
- Malek: Csaba Vastag
- Keresztes: Veca Janicsák

=== Week 10 (18–19 December) ===
==== Saturday ====
- Theme: One song performed on the audition, one with a surprise duet partner, one chosen as the judges' favourite
- Celebrity performer: István Tabáni ("Ments meg!")
- Group performance (by the eliminated finalists): "Ajándék"
- Duets:
  - Norbi L. Király and Lajos D. Nagy
  - Nikolas Takács and Kati Kovács
  - Csaba Vastag and Tamás Vastag

A summary of the contestants' performances on the tenth live show and results show, along with the results.
Act	Order	First song	Order	Second song	Order	Third song	Result
Csaba Vastag	1	"Let Me Entertain You"	6	"Don't Let the Sun Go Down on Me"	8	"Wherever You Will Go"	Safe
Norbi L. Király	2	"You Can Leave Your Hat On"	4	"Közeli helyeken"	9	"All Summer Long"	3rd
Nikolas Takács	3	"Hallelujah"	5	"Ha legközelebb látlak"	7	"And I Am Telling You I'm Not Going"	Safe

==== Sunday, Finals ====
- Theme: Christmas, finalist's favourite previously performed song, Winner Song
- Celebrity performers: Annamari Farkas and Zoli Ádok ("Három álom") and Első Emelet ("Ma van a Te napod")
- Group performance (by the eliminated finalists): "Shake Up Christmas" and "A nagy találkozás"

A summary of the contestants' performances on the finals and results show, along with the results.
Act	Order	First song	Order	Second song	Order	Third song	Result
Csaba Vastag	1	"You"	3	"Don't Let the Sun Go Down on Me"	5	"Hangokba zárva"	Winner
Nikolas Takács	2	"Have Yourself a Merry Little Christmas"	4	"Ain't No Mountain High Enough"	6	"Hangokba zárva"	Runner-up

=== Ratings ===
Episode	Date	Viewers (millions)	Share (%)	Weekly rank	Ref.
Auditions 1	28 August 2010	1.770	38.4	2	
Auditions 2	4 September 2010	2.001	42.1	1	
Auditions 3	11 September 2010	2.031	41.3	-	
Auditions 4	18 September 2010	2.081	43.2	-	
Bootcamp 1	25 September 2010	1.991	39.7	-	
Bootcamp 2	2 October 2010	1.843	36.3	-	
Judges' houses 1	9 October 2010	1.476	29.1	-	
Judges' houses 2	10 October 2010	1.934	36.3	-	
Live show 1	16 October 2010	2.431	50.4	-	
Live show 2	23 October 2010	2.826	56	1	
Live show 3	30 October 2010	2.541	50.7	1	
Live show 4	6 November 2010	2.561	50.1	1	
Live show 5	13 November 2010	-	-	-	
Live show 6	20 November 2010	-	-	-	
Live show 7	27 November 2010	-	-	-	
Live show 8	4 December 2010	-	-	-	
Live show 9	11 December 2010	-	-	-	
Live show 10	18 December 2010	-	-	-	
