= Dóra Danics =

Hungarian singer

Dóra Danics (born 16 May 1986, Budapest) is a Hungarian singer, most notable for being the winner of the fourth season of X-Faktor.

== Life ==
Danics is the daughter of Szilvia Bach, one of the more well-known entertainers in the period from the end of communism in Hungary. Danics played for seven years in an acoustic band. She first participated in the X-Faktor in 2012 was eliminated. In 2013, with the mentoring of Péter Geszti, won the fourth season of X-Faktor. While she never dueled, Danics was the first woman to win the show.

== Discography ==
=== Chart-topping songs ===
Year	Song	Legmagasabb helyezés							Album
Year	Song	VIVA Chart	Class 40	MAHASZ Editors' Choice	MAHASZ Rádiós Top 40	MAHASZ Dance Top 40	MAHASZ Single (track) Top 10	EURO 200	Album
2014	Új út								
2014	Most vagy soha								
2014	Jelenidő								
2014	Leszek a dal (Csaba Vastag, Tibor Kocsis, & Gergő Oláh)								
2015	Pappara								
2016	Bújócska								
Summary
Rank 1 in numbers
Top 10 included
Top 40 included

== Awards ==
- 2014: BRAVO OTTO - Az Év Felfedezettje (jelölés)
