= Mehringer =

Mehringer is a surname. Notable people with this surname include:

- Drew Mehringer, American football coach and former player
- Heinrich Mehringer, German biathlete
- Karl Mehringer, German mountaineer and climber
- Marci Mehringer, Hungarian singer-songwriter
- Peter Mehringer, American Olympic wrestler
