= Gergő Oláh (singer) =

Hungarian footballer and countertenor

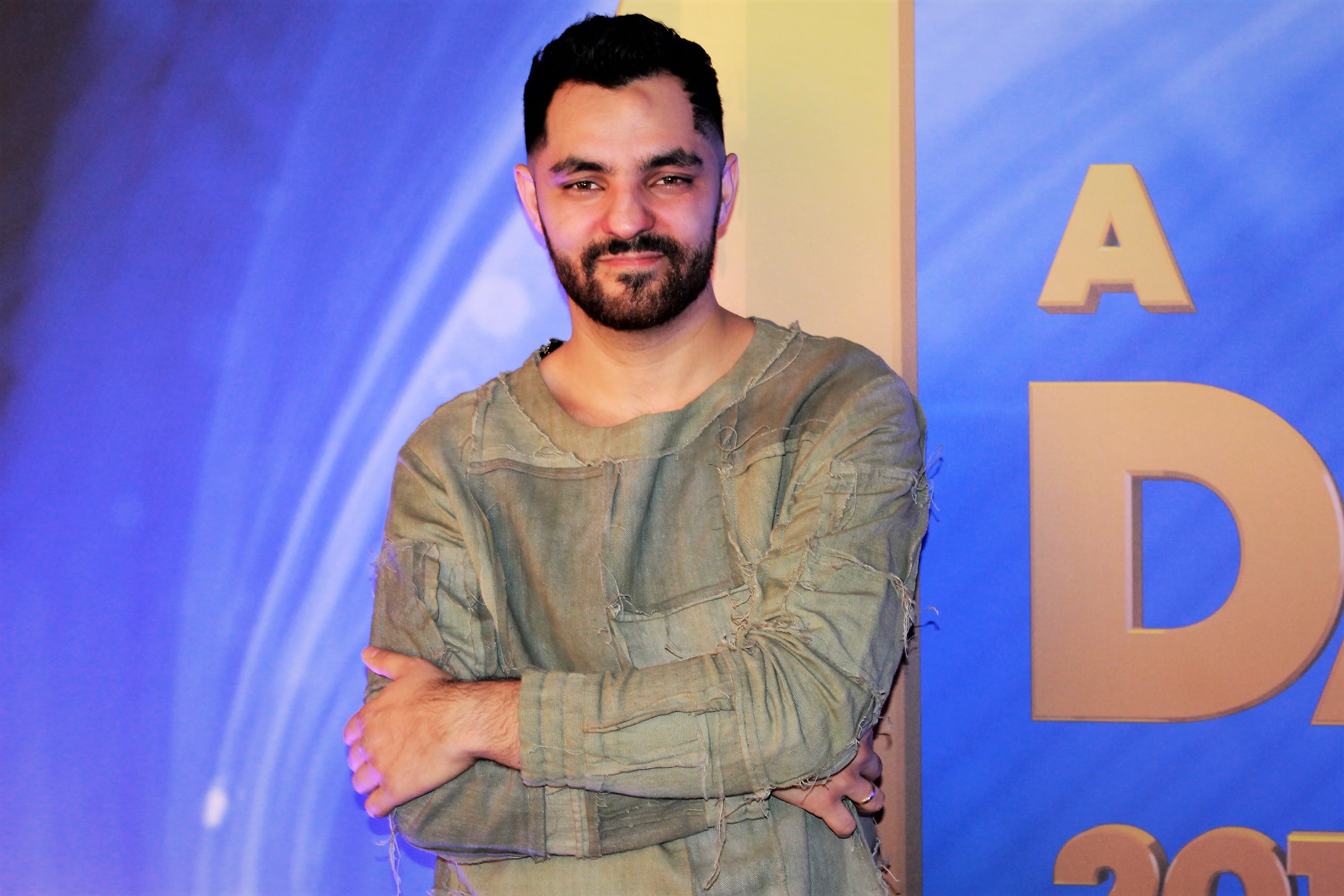

Background information
- Birth name: Gergely Oláh
- Born: 26 November 1988 (age 36); Salgótarján, Hungary
- Occupation(s): Singer, countertenor
- Instrument: vocals
- Years active: 2012–present

Gergő Oláh (born 26 November 1988, Salgótarján) is a Hungarian singer and countertenor of Romani descent, most notable for winning the third season of X-Faktor and for participating in A Dal.

== Personal life & music career ==
Before participating in X-Faktor, he worked in the public sector. He came first in the third season. He is also Gigi Radics's cousin.

=== A Dal ===
In late 2014, Oláh was selected to participate in A Dal 2015, the Hungarian national selection for the Eurovision Song Contest 2015 with the song A tükör előtt. The song reached the semi-final before being eliminated.

In December 2015, he was announced as one of the participants of A Dal 2016. He tried again to represent Hungary in the Eurovision Song Contest, this time with Győz a jó. He made it to the final and then the superfinal, but was not chosen; that honour going to Freddie.

Oláh also competed in A Dal 2017 as part of the band Roma Soul with the song Nyitva a ház. They were eliminated in the semi-finals.

Oláh is competed in A Dal 2019 with the song Hozzád bújnék. He was initially eliminated in the semi-finals, but after Petruska was disqualified following allegations of plagiarism, Oláh, being the eliminated semi-final entrant with the highest points, was brought in to replace Petruska. He was eliminated in the finals.

== Discography ==
Year	Song	Highest rank							Album
Year	Song	VIVA Chart	Class 40	MAHASZ Editors' Choice	MAHASZ Rádiós Top 40	MAHASZ Dance Top 40	MAHASZ Single (track) Top 10	EURO 200 Album	Album
2013	Törj Ki a csendből, Érted élek								Érted élek
2014	Leszek a dal (with Tibor Kocsis, Dóra Danics, and Csaba Vastag), A tükör előtt								
		Totals							
1. Rank numbers									
Top 10 included									
Top 40 included									
