= Tamás Vastag =

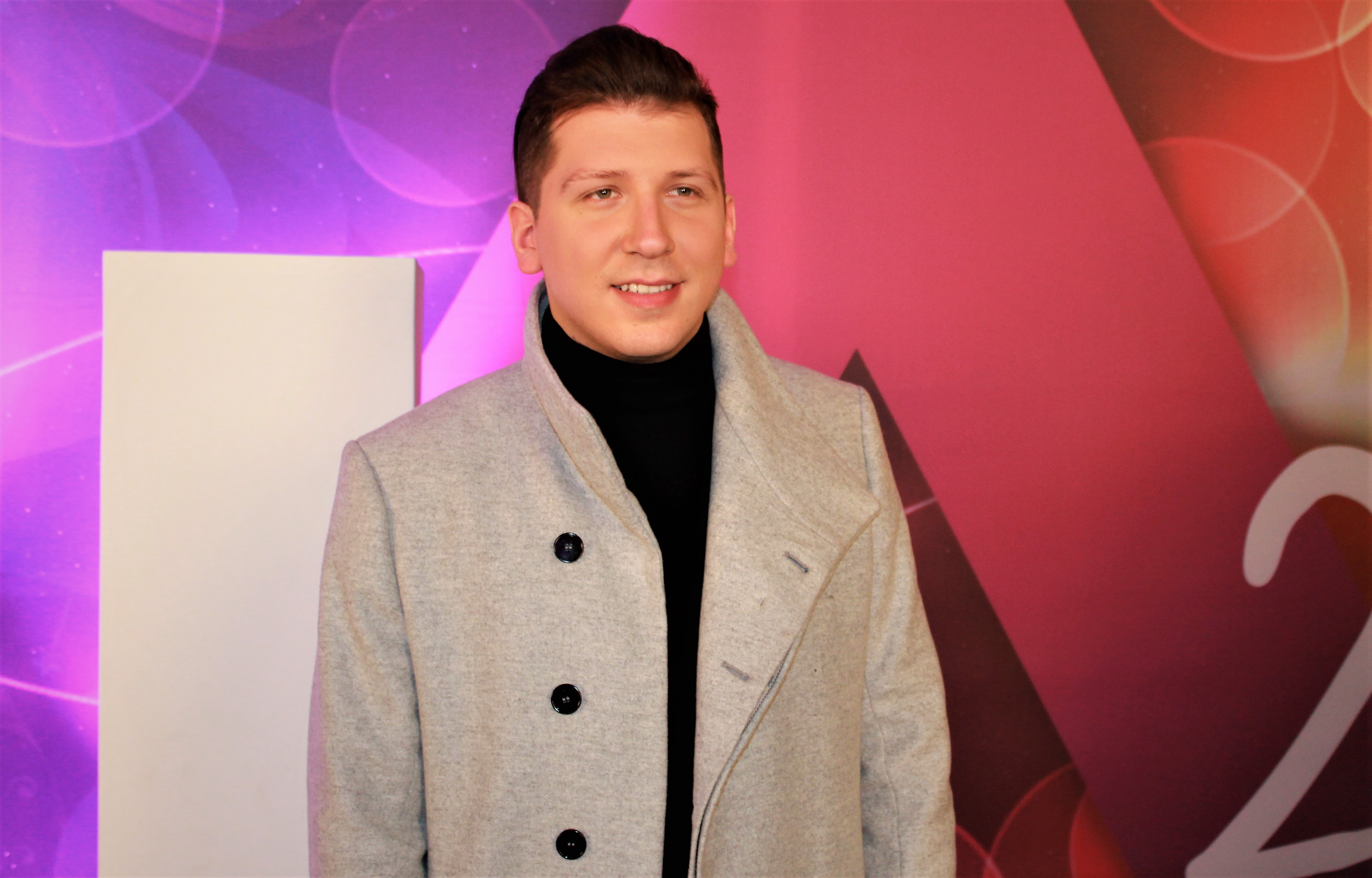
- Tamás Vastag in 2018

Background information
- Born: 28 June 1991 (age 33); Veszprém, Hungary
- Genres: Pop, rock, pop rock
- Occupation: Singer
- Instrument: vocals
- Years active: 2010 – present

Tamás Vastag (born 28 June 1991) is a Hungarian Music Awards-winning Hungarian singer and actor. He is best known for coming 5th on the first season of the Hungarian version of X-Factor.

== Personal life and career ==
Tamás Vastag was born on 28 June 1991 in the town of Veszprém, near Lake Balaton, the son of Sándor Vastag, a university professor, and Márta, a teacher. His two brothers are Balázs and fellow X-Faktor contestant and winner Csaba Vastag. On 22 June 2016, he had a son, Sándor Samu Vastag.

=== Career ===
In 2010, he and his brother Csaba participated in the first season of the X-Faktor, the Hungarian counterpart of the X Factor. Tamás came 5th, while his brother Csaba won the contest. In autumn of 2011, fellow Hungarian singer Ildikó Keresztes featured Tamás in her song Hátha lehet még in the album A démon, aki bennem van, along with Norbert L. Király and Nikolas Takács.

=== A Dal ===
In late 2012, Tamás Vastag was announced to participate in the 2013 edition of A Dal, the Hungarian national selection for the Eurovision Song Contest. With the song Holnaptól, he reached the final of the contest (from the 2nd heat, to the 2nd semi-final, and finally to the final), and was chosen by the judges to reach the superfinal of the contest, where, if chosen by the televote, would have represented Hungary at the Eurovision Song Contest 2013. However, ByeAlex won the televote and was chosen to be representative of that year. In late 2013, Tamás was announced to participate again in the 2014 edition of A Dal, this time he attempted to represent Hungary in the Eurovision Song Contest 2014 with the song Miss One Smile. While the song was initially in English, Tamás decided to perform the Hungarian version of the song, entitled Állj meg világ. Chosen to sing again in the 2nd heat, Tamás was eliminated, with only 35 points, being beat out by fellow contestant Bogi. He participated in A Dal again for the 2018 edition with the song Ne hagyj reményt. He was eliminated in the semi-finals.
