= X-Faktor series 11 =

X-Faktor
- Series 11
- Hosted by: Dávid Miller
- Judges: Laci Gáspár; Peti Puskás; Erika Herceg; ByeAlex
- Winner: Bernadett Solyom
- Winning mentor: ByeAlex
- Runner-up: Kevin Kiss

Release
- Original network: RTL
- Original release: 3 September – 19 November 2022

X-Faktor is a Hungarian television music competition to find new singing talent. The eleventh series of the show was broadcast on RTL from 3 September to 19 November 2022. Miller Dávid was the presenter and ByeAlex, Laci Gáspár, Peti Puskás remained in the jury. Adél Csobot left X-Faktor and was replaced by Erika Herceg.

Bernadett Solyom won the season and ByeAlex became the winning mentor for the fourth time in a row.

== Auditions ==
Open auditions took place in Budapest in March 2022. The judges' auditions started on June in Budapest.

== Judges' houses ==
This year, there were no guest speakers, but each mentor listened to the performances of the four categories, but the rules changed: the mentor of a team automatically took two contestants to the live shows, sent two home and dropped two, one of whom went on to another mentor's team.

The twelve eliminated acts were:

- Gáspár's team: Mónika Csuka, Denisa Fülöp, Liza Szalai
- ByeAlex's team: Tünde Dankó, LongStoryShort!
- Herceg's team: Bucca Brothers, René Krága, Liliána Lakatos, Gréta Nagy
- Puskás team: Zsolt Beri "Berry", Márton Miszlai, Anna Kornis

== Contestants ==
Key:

– Winner
– Runner-Up
– Third Place

Mentor	Chosen by mentor		Chosen by other mentors
Laci Gáspár	Luca Mihályfi	Szebasztián Serbán	Sophia Khan
ByeAlex	Isky & Szkym	Bernadett Solyom	Ádám Beretka
Erika Herceg	Enikő Bodrogi	Synergy	Alexa Helfy
Peti Puskás	Marcell Boros	Kevin Kiss	Ábel Váradi

== Results summary ==
In season nine, the rule from last season remained, four chairs wear place in the studio, which they can sit for, the mentors want to put forward to the next week, the seats on the chair may change during the show. Based on viewers' votes, another four contestants would be able to enter the next live show.

– mentored by Erika Herceg	– Danger zone; Safe
– mentored by ByeAlex	– Safe
– mentored by Peti Puskás	– Eliminated by SMS vote
– mentored by Laci Gáspár	– Most public votes

Contestant	Week 1	Week 2	Week 3		Week 4	Final Week 5	
Contestant	Week 1	Week 2	Round 1	Round 2	Week 4	Round 1	Round 2
Bernadett Solyom	Safe	Safe	Safe	Safe	Safe	1st 42.57%	Winner; 61.22%
Kevin Kiss	Safe	Safe	Safe	Safe	Safe	2nd 31.64%	Runner-up; 38.78%
Luca Mihályfi	Safe	Safe	Safe	Safe	Safe	3rd 25.79%	Eliminated (Week 5)
Alexa Helfy	Safe	Safe	Safe	Safe	Eliminated	Eliminated (Week 4)	
Enikő Bodrogi	Safe	Safe	Safe	Eliminated	Eliminated (Week 3)		
Synergy	Safe	Safe	Eliminated	Eliminated (Week 3)			
Marcell Boros	Safe	Eliminated	Eliminated (Week 2)				
Szebasztián Serbán	Safe	Eliminated	Eliminated (Week 2)				
Ábel Váradi	Eliminated	Eliminated (Week 1)					
Ádám Beretka	Eliminated	Eliminated (Week 1)					
Isky & Szkym	Eliminated	Eliminated (Week 1)					
Sophia Khan	Eliminated	Eliminated (Week 1)					
Eliminated	Isky & Szkym	Szebasztián Serbán	Synergy	Enikő Bodrogi	Alexa Helfy	Luca Mihályfi	Kevin Kiss
Eliminated	Ádám Beretka	Szebasztián Serbán	Synergy	Enikő Bodrogi	Alexa Helfy	Luca Mihályfi	Kevin Kiss
Eliminated	Sophia Khan	Szebasztián Serbán	Synergy	Enikő Bodrogi	Alexa Helfy	Luca Mihályfi	Kevin Kiss
Eliminated	Ábel Váradi	Marcell Boros	Synergy	Enikő Bodrogi	Alexa Helfy	Luca Mihályfi	Kevin Kiss

== Live Shows ==
=== Week 1 (22 October) ===
– Get a chair, safe and go to the next live show

In the first live show, four chairs are placed, and the juries vote at least three yes, the competitors sit down. If each was full and another competitor has come, and the juries vote at least again three yes, the competitor with the lowest number of votes in the public vote would hand over the chair.

A summary of the contestants' performances on the first live show and results show, along with the results.
Act	Order	Song	Result
Ádám Beretka	1	"Anakonda"	Eliminated
Sophia Khan	2	"Kiss Me More"	Eliminated
Marcell Boros	3	"Üzenek" (original song)	Danger zone; saved
Enikő Bodrogi	4	"Hogyan tudnék élni nélküled"	Danger zone; saved
Ábel Váradi	5	"Maradj bennem!" (original song)	Eliminated
Alexa Helfy	6	"FOUR MOODS"	Danger zone; saved
Bernadett Solyom	7	"Gangsta's Paradise"	Safe
Luca Mihályfi	8	"Crazy"	Safe
Isky & Szkym	9	"Fiatal vagyok" (original song)	Eliminated
Kevin Kiss	10	"Táncolj ma!" (original song)	Safe
Szebasztián Serbán	11	"Mondd, miért szeretsz te mást?"	Safe
Synergy	12	"Pink Venom"	Danger zone; saved

=== Week 2 (29 October) ===
– Get a chair, safe and go to the next live show

In the second live show, three chairs are placed, and the juries vote at least three yes, the competitors sit down. If each was full and another competitor has come, and the juries vote at least again three yes, the competitor with the lowest number of votes in the public vote would hand over the chair.

A summary of the contestants' performances on the second live show and results show, along with the results.
Act	Order	Song	Result
Szebasztián Serbán	1	"Angyal" (original song)	Eliminated
Enikő Bodrogi	2	"Happy"	Danger zone; saved
Alexa Helfy	3	"Love on the Brain"	Danger zone; saved
Bernadett Solyom	4	"Killing Me Softly with His Song"	Safe
Marcell Boros	5	"Te vagy nekem" (original song)	Eliminated
Kevin Kiss	6	"Álomarcú lány"	Safe
Synergy	7	"Mesélek a bornak"	Danger zone; saved
Luca Mihályfi	8	"Bella ciao"	Safe

=== Week 3 (5 November) ===
In the first round, there is only a vote and 1 competitor will be eliminated

– Get a chair, safe and go to the next live show

In the third live show, two chairs are placed, and the juries vote at least three yes, the competitors sit down. If each was full and another competitor has come, and the juries vote at least again three yes, the competitor with the lowest number of votes in the public vote would hand over the chair.

A summary of the contestants' performances on the third live show and results show, along with the results.
Act	Order	First song	Order	Second song	Result
Kevin Kiss	1	"Szeretlek is meg nem is"	11	"Esőben" (original song)	Safe
Bernadett Solyom	2	"Stan"	10	"Maradj így"	Safe
Synergy	3	"Girlpower" (original song)	N/A	N/A (already eliminated)	Eliminated
Luca Mihályfi	4	"Rendben" (original song)	8	"Okari"/"Tisztán iszom"	Danger zone; saved
Enikő Bodrogi	5	"voltmárkicsi"	7	"Kinek mondjam el vétkeimet?"	Danger zone; Eliminated
Alexa Helfy	6	"Toy"	9	"Megmondtam"	Danger zone; saved

=== Week 4 (12 November) ===
– Get a chair, safe and go to the next live show

Week 4 changes the rules for the chair. In the event tie between the mentors' votes, the spectators' vote will determine whether or not the competitor is allowed to sit on the chair. In the fourth live show, two chairs are placed again, and the juries vote at least three yes, the competitors sit down. If each was full and another competitor has come, and the juries vote at least again three yes, the competitor with the lowest number of votes in the public vote would hand over the chair.

A summary of the contestants' performances on the fourth live show and results show, along with the results.
Act	Order	First song (Duet with a Celebrity)	Order	Second song	Result
Kevin Kiss	1	"Úristen" (with Róbert Szikora)	2	"Nagyapám" (original song)	Safe
Alexa Helfy	3	"Tele a szívem" (with Paulina)	4	"Hush Hush"	Eliminated
Luca Mihályfi	5	"Csönd éve" (with Nikolas Takács)	6	"Purple Rain"	Danger zone; saved
Bernadett Solyom	7	"Néked szólnak a harangok" (with Bagossy Brothers Company)	8	"Lose Yourself"	Safe

=== Week 5 (19 November) ===
A summary of the contestants' performances on the fifth live show and results show, along with the results.
Act	Order	First song	Order	Second song	Order	Third song	Result
Bernadett Solyom	1	"Hot in Herre"	5	"A város másik oldalán"	7	"Billionaire"	Winner
Kevin Kiss	2	"Can't Help Falling in Love"	4	"Még nem veszíthetek"	6	"Csinibaba"	Runner-up
Luca Mihályfi	3	"Through the Fire"	N/A (already eliminated)				3rd Place

== Ratings ==
Episode	Air date	Official rating (millions)	Weekly rank
Auditions 1	3 September	0.94	1
Auditions 2	10 September	0.88	2
Auditions 3	17 September	1.06	2
Auditions 4	24 September	1.12	2
Bootcamp	1 October	0.75	5
Six-chair challenge	8 October	0.76	3
Judges' houses 1	15 October	0.64	7
Judges' houses 2	16 October	0.52	10
Live show 1	22 October	0.69	5
Live show 2	29 October	0.61	7
Live show 3	5 November	0.56	9
Live show 4	12 November	0.56	7
Final	19 November	0.61	10
