= Ricco & Claudia =

Slovak musical duo

- Origin: Hungary, Slovakia
- Genres: Pop; soul
- Years active: 2014–present
- Members: Richard Ricco Šárközi; Klaudia Farkas
- Website: riccoclaudia.hu

Ricco & Claudia is a Slovak music duo consisting of Richard Ricco Šárközi and Klaudia Farkas. Together they won the seventh season of the Hungarian version of the X Factor. Previously, in 2014, they had finished as runners-up of the first season of the Slovak version of the programme.
