= X-Faktor series 7 =

Season of television series

X-Faktor
- Series 7
- Hosted by: Ramóna Kiss; Bence Istenes (Final)
- Judges: Laci Gáspár; Gigi Radics; Peti Puskás; ByeAlex
- Winner: Ricco & Claudia
- Winning mentor: Laci Gáspár
- Runner-up: Serena Rigacci

Release
- Original network: RTL Klub
- Original release: 2 September – 25 November 2017

Series chronology
- ← Previous; Series 6 Next → Series 8

X-Faktor is a Hungarian television music competition to find new singing talent. The seventh series aired on RTL Klub in 2017. Instead of Bence Istenes in Season 7, Kiss Ramona was the new show host. ByeAlex, Laci Gáspár, Peti Puskás remained in the jury in the 7th season. After 3 years Gabi Tóth, left X-FaKtor, and was replaced by Gigi Radics. Ricco & Claudia won the competition and they became the first group to win the show and also they became the first foreign act to win the show.

== Judges' houses ==
The Judges' houses episodes aired on 7 October and 8 October 2017. As opposed to previous seasons, this was not the place for guest speakers, but every mentor listened to the performances of the four categories, then the mentor of that category would automatically choose two contestants for the live shows and leave one more contestant for the other three mentors to choose. The Hungarian X-Factor is the first where this format is used.

The twelve eliminated acts were:

- Boys: Martin Barna, Dániel Bereznay, Pál Kovács
- Girls: Boglárka Izsó, Anna Lengyel, Szandra Klarissza Oláh
- Over 25s: Snjezana Pecija, Dezső Rékasi, David Vardanov
- Groups: Catchy Workshop, Florián Kvintett, M&M

== Contestants ==
Key:

– Winner
– Runner-Up
– Third place
– Withdrawn

Category (mentor)	Chosen by mentor		Chosen by other mentors	
Boys (Radics)	Roland Gulyás	Krisztián Nagy^{1}	Norbert Mézes	Dániel Bereznay
Girls (ByeAlex)	Viola Erdős	Bettina Tóth	Serena Rigacci	
Over 25s (Puskás)	Lívia Abaházi Nagy	Dániel Berta	Péter Hegedűs	
Groups (Gáspár)	Radio Mobster	Ricco & Claudia	London Kids	

At the X-Factor press conference on October 11, Krisztián Nagy announced that he was withdrawing from the competition due to difficulties he was having during the preparation period. He was replaced by Daniel Bereznay.

== Results summary ==
– mentored by ByeAlex (Girls)	– Bottom two/three
– mentored by Gigi Radics (Boys)	– Safe
– mentored by Laci Gáspár (Groups)	– Eliminated by SMS vote
– mentored by Peti Puskás (Over 25s)

Contestant	Week 1	Week 2	Week 3	Week 4	Week 5	Week 6	Final Week 7	
Contestant	Week 1	Week 2	Week 3	Week 4	Week 5	Week 6	Round 1	Round 2
Ricco & Claudia	1st	1st	2nd	2nd	1st	1st	1st	Winners; 50.93%
Serena Rigacci	2nd	2nd	1st	1st	2nd	2nd	2nd	Runner-up; 49.07%
Roland Gulyás	3rd	3rd	3rd	3rd	3rd	3rd	3rd	Eliminated (Week 7)
Bettina Tóth	4th	5th	4th	4th	4th	4th	Eliminated (Week 6)	
Dániel Berta	5th	7th	5th	6th	5th	Eliminated (Week 5)		
Lívia Abaházi Nagy	7th	4th	6th	5th	Eliminated (Week 4)			
Viola Erdős	9th	9th	7th	Eliminated (Week 3)				
Dániel Bereznay	6th	6th	8th	Eliminated (Week 3)				
London Kids	10th	8th	Eliminated (Week 2)					
Norbert Mézes	8th	10th	Eliminated (Week 2)					
Péter Hegedűs	11th	Eliminated (Week 1)						
Radio Mobster	12th	Eliminated (Week 1)						
Final Showdown	London Kids, Péter Hegedűs	London Kids, Viola Erdős	Lívia Abaházi Nagy, Viola Erdős	Lívia Abaházi Nagy, Dániel Berta	Dániel Berta, Bettina Tóth	Roland Gulyás, Bettina Tóth	No judges' vote or final showdown: public votes alone decide who is eliminated and who ultimately wins	
Gáspár's vote to eliminate	Péter Hegedűs	Viola Erdős	Lívia Abaházi Nagy	Dániel Berta	Dániel Berta	Bettina Tóth	No judges' vote or final showdown: public votes alone decide who is eliminated and who ultimately wins	
Puskás's vote to eliminate	London Kids	London Kids	Viola Erdős	Lívia Abaházi Nagy	Bettina Tóth	Roland Gulyás	No judges' vote or final showdown: public votes alone decide who is eliminated and who ultimately wins	
Radics's vote to eliminate	London Kids	London Kids	Viola Erdős	Lívia Abaházi Nagy	Dániel Berta	Bettina Tóth	No judges' vote or final showdown: public votes alone decide who is eliminated and who ultimately wins	
ByeAlex's vote to eliminate	Péter Hegedűs	London Kids	Lívia Abaházi Nagy	Lívia Abaházi Nagy	Dániel Berta	Roland Gulyás	No judges' vote or final showdown: public votes alone decide who is eliminated and who ultimately wins	
Eliminated	Péter Hegedűs; 2 from 4 votes Deadlock	London Kids; 3 from 4 votes Majority	Viola Erdős; 2 from 4 votes Deadlock	Lívia Abaházi Nagy; 3 from 4 votes Majority	Dániel Berta; 3 from 4 votes Majority	Bettina Tóth; 2 from 4 votes Deadlock	Roland Gulyás; 3rd Place	Serena Rigacci; 2nd place
Eliminated	Radio Mobster; SMS vote	Norbert Mézes; SMS vote	Dániel Bereznay; SMS vote	Lívia Abaházi Nagy; 3 from 4 votes Majority	Dániel Berta; 3 from 4 votes Majority	Bettina Tóth; 2 from 4 votes Deadlock	Roland Gulyás; 3rd Place	Ricco & Claudia; 1st Place

== Live Shows ==
=== Week 1 (14 October) ===
- Celebrity performer: Gabi Tóth ("Ízedre vágyom")
- Group performance: "Love and Bass"/"Bababo"

A summary of the contestants' performances on the first live show and results show, along with the results.
Act	Order	Song	Result
Dániel Berta	1	"Élvezd"	Safe
Bettina Tóth	2	"Mercy"	Safe
London Kids	3	"Into You"	Bottom three
Norbert Mézes	4	"Bodzavirág"	Safe
Dániel Bereznay	5	"Too Close"	Safe
Ricco & Claudia	6	"I Will Always Love You"	Safe
Viola Erdős	7	"Ha az életben"	Safe
Lívia Abaházi Nagy	8	"Nessun dorma"	Safe
Radio Mobster	9	"Anti Anti"	Eliminated
Roland Gulyás	10	"Thinking Out Loud"	Safe
Serena Rigacci	11	"Wrecking Ball"	Safe
Péter Hegedűs	12	"Freestyler"	Bottom three
Final showdown details
London Kids	1	"The One That Got Away"	Safe
Péter Hegedűs	2	"U Can't Touch This"	Eliminated

Judge's vote to eliminate

- Gáspár: Péter Hegedűs
- Puskás: London Kids
- Radics: London Kids
- ByeAlex: Péter Hegedűs

With each act receiving two votes, the result was reverted to the earlier public vote. Péter Hegedűs received the fewest votes and was eliminated.

=== Week 2 (21 October) ===
A summary of the contestants' performances on the second live show and results show, along with the results.
Act	Order	Song	Result
Serena Rigacci	1	"Crawling"	Safe
Dániel Berta	2	"Canción del Mariachi"	Safe
London Kids	3	"Girls / Girls / Boys"	Bottom three
Dániel Bereznay	4	"When I Was Your Man"	Safe
Bettina Tóth	5	"Look What You Made Me Do"	Safe
Norbert Mézes	6	"The Winner Takes It All"	Eliminated
Roland Gulyás	7	"Uprising"	Safe
Ricco & Claudia	8	"Skyfall"	Safe
Viola Erdős	9	"Seven Nation Army"	Bottom three
Lívia Abaházi Nagy	10	"A csitári hegyek alatt"	Safe
Final showdown details
London Kids	1	"Sose"	Eliminated
Viola Erdős	2	"Hétköznapi"	Safe

Judge's vote to eliminate

- Gáspár: Viola Erdős
- ByeAlex: London Kids
- Puskás: London Kids
- Radics: London Kids

=== Week 3 (28 October) ===
- Celebrity performer: Dóra Danics ("A nagylány vidám")

A summary of the contestants' performances on the third live show and results show, along with the results.
Act	Order	Song	Result
Ricco & Claudia	1	"Ain't No Mountain High Enough"	Safe
Viola Erdős	2	"Earthquake"	Bottom three
Lívia Abaházi Nagy	3	"Habanera (carmen)"	Bottom three
Dániel Bereznay	4	"Shape of You"/"Galway Girl"	Eliminated
Bettina Tóth	5	"Humble"	Safe
Serena Rigacci	6	"All by Myself"	Safe
Dániel Berta	7	"Júlia nem akar a földön járni"	Safe
Roland Gulyás	8	"Álomarcú lány"	Safe
Final showdown details
Viola Erdős	1	"Márti dala"	Eliminated
Lívia Abaházi Nagy	2	"I Dreamed a Dream" (Hungarian)	Safe

Judge's vote to eliminate

- ByeAlex: Lívia Abaházi Nagy
- Radics: Viola Erdős
- Puskás: Viola Erdős
- Gáspár: Lívia Abaházi Nagy

With each act receiving two votes, the result was reverted to the earlier public vote. Viola Erdős received the fewest votes and was eliminated.

=== Week 4 (4 November) ===
A summary of the contestants' performances on the fourth live show and results show, along with the results.
Act	Order	Song	Result
Lívia Abaházi Nagy	1	"The Phantom of the Opera"	Bottom two
Bettina Tóth	2	"Zsolti, a béka"	Safe
Roland Gulyás	3	"Believer"	Safe
Ricco & Claudia	4	"Tears"	Safe
Dániel Berta	5	"They Don't Care About Us"	Bottom two
Serena Rigacci	6	"Tavaszi szél vizet áraszt"	Safe
Duet
Dániel Berta and Roland Gulyás	1	"Say Say Say"	
Lívia Abaházi Nagy & Ricco & Claudia	2	"Adagio"	
Serena Rigacci and Bettina Tóth	3	"Swalla"	
Final showdown details
Dániel Berta	1	"Vertigo"	Safe
Lívia Abaházi Nagy	2	"Egy rózsaszál"	Eliminated

Judge's vote to eliminate

- ByeAlex: Lívia Abaházi Nagy
- Radics: Lívia Abaházi Nagy
- Gáspár: Dániel Berta
- Puskás: Lívia Abaházi Nagy

=== Week 5 (11 November) ===
- Theme: One Hungarian song and one English song

A summary of the contestants' performances on the fifth live show and results show, along with the results.
Act	Order	First song	Order	Second song	Result
Bettina Tóth	1	"Bodak Yellow"	9	"Zenebuddhizmus"	Bottom two
Ricco & Claudia	2	"Megtalállak"	6	"Shackles (Praise You)"	Safe
Roland Gulyás	3	"Fallin'"	10	"A boldogság Te vagy"	Safe
Dániel Berta	4	"Erre még meghívlak"	7	"Word Up!"	Bottom two
Serena Rigacci	5	"Over You"	8	"That’s What I Like"	Safe
Final showdown details
Dániel Berta	1	"Call Me"			Eliminated
Bettina Tóth	2	"Egyszer fent, egyszer lent"			Safe

Judge's vote to eliminate

- ByeAlex: Dániel Berta
- Radics: Dániel Berta
- Puskás: Bettina Tóth
- Gáspár: Dániel Berta

=== Week 6 (18 November) ===
A summary of the contestants' performances on the sixth live show and results show, along with the results.
Act	Order	First song	Order	Second song	Result
Serena Rigacci	1	"Toxic"	5	"Don't Let Me Down"	Safe
Ricco & Claudia	2	"Ajtók mögött"	8	"As"	Safe
Bettina Tóth	3	"H•A•M"	7	"Képkockák "	Bottom two
Roland Gulyás	4	"Kicsi, gyere velem rózsát szedni"	6	"Livin' on a Prayer"	Bottom two
Final showdown details
Bettina Tóth	1	"New Slaves"			Eliminated
Roland Gulyás	2	"Take Me to Church"			Safe

Judge's vote to eliminate

- ByeAlex: Roland Gulyás
- Radics: Bettina Tóth
- Puskás: Roland Gulyás
- Gáspár: Bettina Tóth

With each act receiving two votes, the result was reverted to the earlier public vote. Bettina Tóth received the fewest votes and was eliminated.

=== Week 7 Final (25 November) ===
- Theme: mentor's choice, a duet with mentor, contestant's choice, winner's single

A summary of the contestants' performances on the seventh live show and results show, along with the results.
Act	Order	First song	Order	Second song	Order	Third song	Order	Fourth song	Result
Roland Gulyás	1	"Numb"	6	"Vadonatúj érzés" (with Gigi Radics)	N/A (Already Eliminated)				3rd Place
Ricco & Claudia	2	"Writing's on the Wall"	5	"És Mégis Forog a Föld" (with Laci Gáspár)	8	"Lay Me Down"	9	"Ha minden van, semmit sem látsz"	Winner
Serena Rigacci	3	"And I Am Telling You I'm Not Going"	4	"Az én rózsám"(with ByeAlex)	7	"Praying"	10	"Way Too Young"	Runner-up
