= Vastagh =

Vastagh is a Hungarian surname. Notable people with the surname include:

- György Vastagh (1834–1922), Hungarian painter
- Pál Vastagh (born 1946), Hungarian politician and jurist

== See also ==
- Vastag
