= Marci Mehringer =

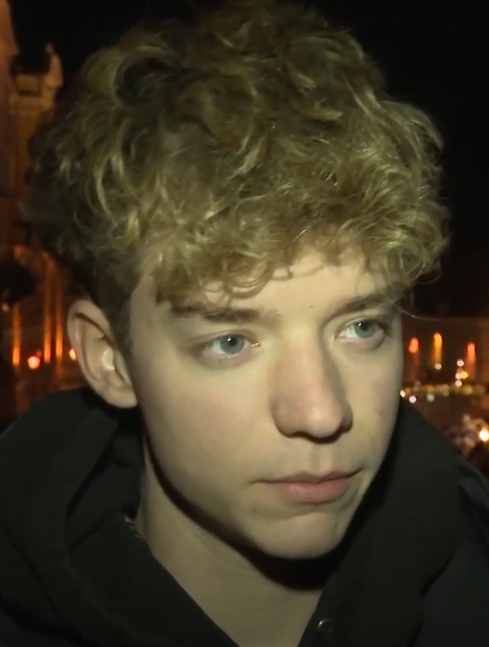
- Mehringer in 2021

Background information
- Also known as: Mehringer Marcell
- Born: March 28, 2002 (age 24); Pécs
- Occupations: Musician, singer-songwriter
- Instrument: Singing

Marcell "Marci" Mehringer (born 28 March 2002) is a Hungarian musician, singer, and songwriter. He finished fourth in season 10 of X-Faktor.

== Biography ==
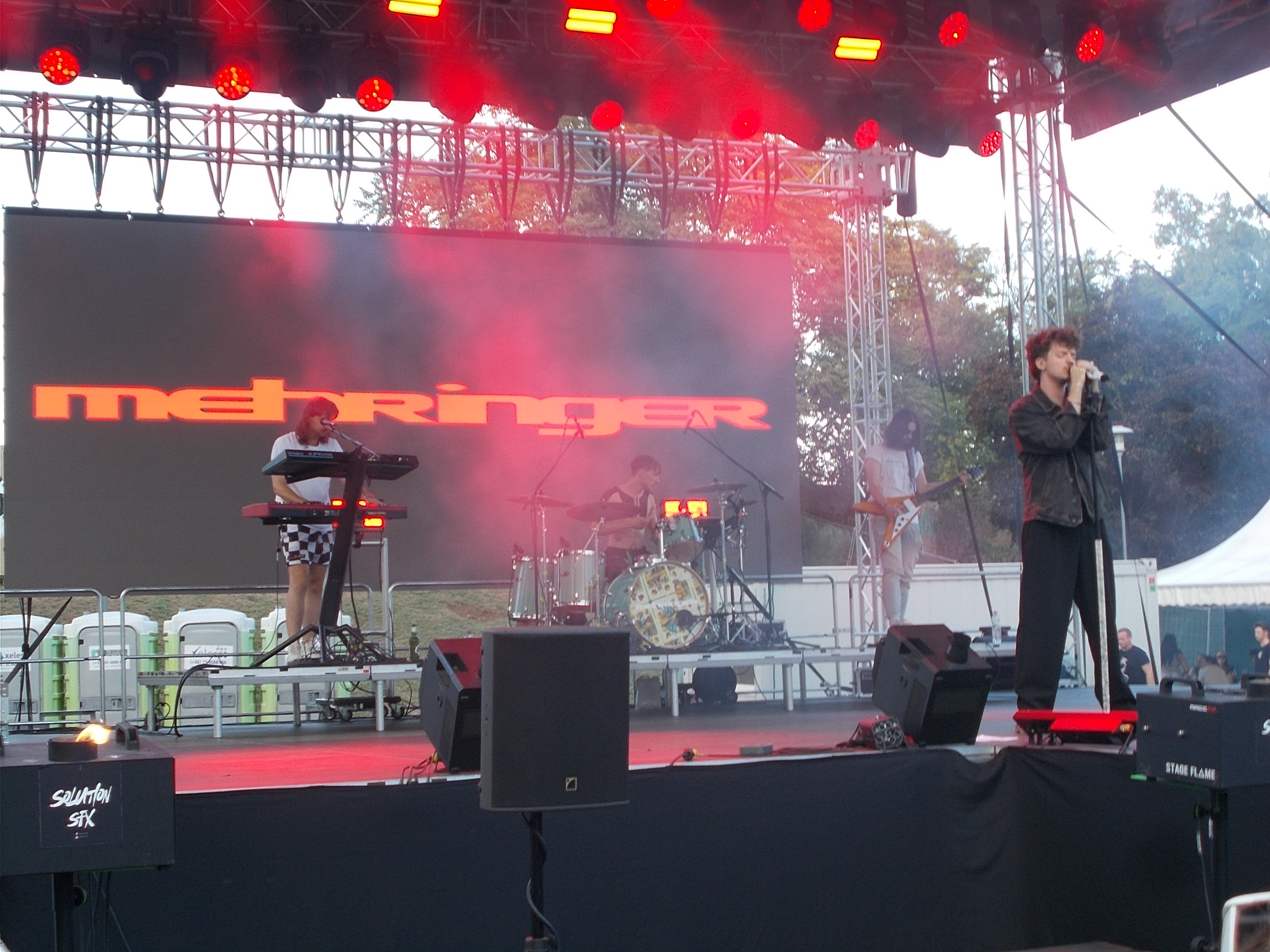
Mehringer's concert at City Park in Budapest on 6 September 2025

He was born on 28 March 2002 in Pécs. He studied at Leőwey Klára Gimnázium in Pécs.

He participated in season 10 of X-Faktor, during which his mentor was ByeAlex. He finished fourth.

On 4 July 2025, Mehringer, Balkan VIP, and Sosehol released the government-critical song "Szar az élet". He performed this song at the Rendszerbontó Nagykoncert (lit. 'System-demolishing Grand Concert') two days before the 2026 election. Following the inauguration of Prime Minister Péter Magyar, Mehringer sang with Gábor Presser in front of the Parliament. Máté Kersner wrote for Telex that "with his songs about public life and the mood of the nation, he has captivated huge crowds over the past year and a half".

In May 2026, Mehringer released his album Szabadság, szerelem, working closely with Gábor Presser.

== Discography ==
=== Albums ===
List of albums, with chart positions, showing year released
Title	Year	Peak chart positions
Title	Year	Mahasz Album Top 40
111	2023	—
A bálban	2024	32
Szabadság, szerelem	2026	1
"—" denotes items which did not chart.

=== Extended plays ===
- Ezt is loptuk! (2022)

=== Songs ===
List of songs, with chart positions, showing year released and album name
Title	Year	Peak chart positions					Album
Title	Year	Mahasz				Billboard	Album
Title	Year	Rádiós Top 40	Magyar Rádiós Top 40	Single Top 40	Stream Top 40	Hungary Songs	Album
"Késő már"	2021	38	34	26	26	—	Non-album single
"Hóvirág"	2022	—	—	17	39	—	Ezt is loptuk!
"Szar az élet" (feat. Balkan VIP, Sosehol)	2025	—	—	3	—	1	Szabadság, szerelem
"Szeptember végén (stressz)" (feat. Sosehol)	2025	—	—	22	—	18	Szabadság, szerelem
"Éden" (feat. Sosehol)	2025	—	—	6	—	6	Szabadság, szerelem
"Bad Bunny"	2026	—	—	17	—	11	Szabadság, szerelem
"Boszorkány"	2026	—	—	10	—	7	Szabadság, szerelem
"Féltéglák"	2026	—	—	18	—	12	Szabadság, szerelem
"Remélem" (feat. Sosehol, Indigo)	2026	—	—	17	—	12	Szabadság, szerelem
"—" denotes items which did not chart.

== Television appearances ==
- X-Faktor season 10 (2021)
- Az Árulók - Gyilkosság a kastélyban (2024)

== Awards ==
- Magyar Klipszemle Best Image Clip award for "Szar az élet" (2025)
