= Enikő Muri =

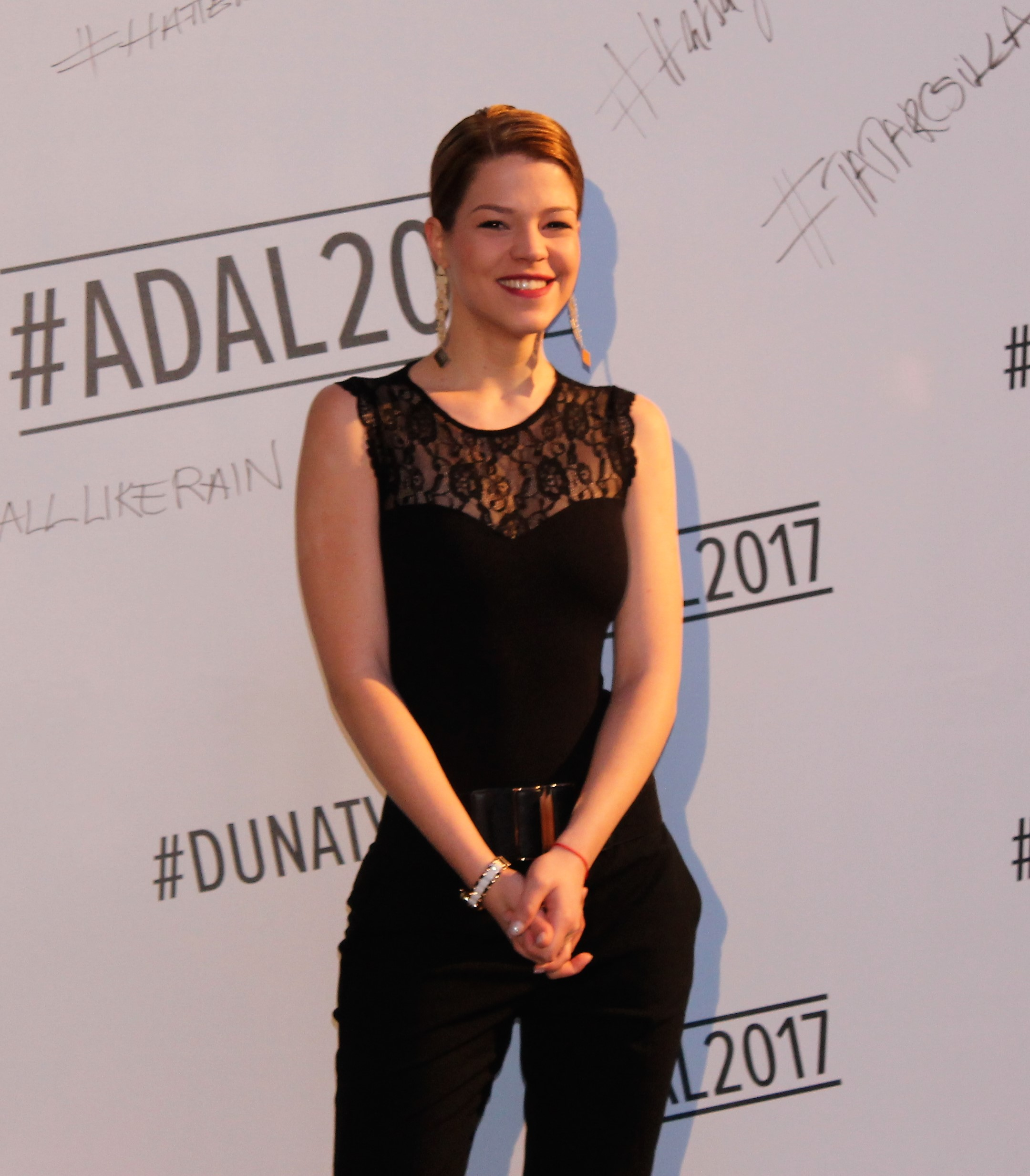
- Enikő Muri in 2016.

Background information
- Born: 24 April 1990 (age 36); Nyíregyháza, Hungary
- Occupations: Singer, political activist
- Instrument: vocals
- Years active: 2006–present

Enikő Muri (born 24 April 1990, Nyíregyháza, Hungary) is a Hungarian musical and theater actress, singer, and political activist, known for coming in 2nd place on the second season of X-Faktor, the highest placing female contestant for that season and for being a political activist of the Fidesz party.

== Life ==
Born in Nyíregyháza, Muri was raised in Nagyvarsány. She started singing as a child. In 2006, she took part in a karaoke TV show on VIVA Hungary, Shibuya, which she won. She then graduated from secondary school in Nyíregyháza and majored in marketing in college. In 2008, she released Szomorú, but was unsuccessful. In 2010, she appeared on the RTL Klub show X-Faktor, but failed. It was a big disappointment for her and almost decided to stop singing, but in 2011, she appeared again in X-Faktor, and this time got into the live broadcast. She was mentored by Feró Nagy, and eventually earned second place, and became a well-known singer. Her first album, consisting of the songs sung from the X-Faktor, was released in 2011, which reached the MAHASZ sales list in second place, and in addition has been certified as a double-platinum album. She also performed at the Madách Theatre in December 2011, and played the role of Márta Vágó, the love interest of Attila József in the play Én, József Attila. In May 2012, she performed with Mária Gór Nagy. She released her first solo album on 27 August 2012, titled Enciklopédia. She also contributed to Attila Dolhai's album Shining. In 2016, she was on the fourth season of Sztárban sztár and finished fourth. She participated in A Dal 2017, 2017 the Hungarian national selection for the Eurovision Song Contest, with the song Jericho. She was eliminated in the third heat.

== Discography ==
=== Album ===
Year	Album	Top position	Milestones
Year	Album	MAHASZ Top 40	Milestones
2011	Az első X – Az élő show-k 10 legnagyobb kedvence: Released: 19 December 2011	2	2× Platinum
2012	Enciklopédia: Released: 27 August 2012	2	

=== Singles/Video clips ===
- 2012: Késő már
- 2012: Botladozva
- 2012: Amikor minden összedől
- 2013: Give some get some
- 2013: Maradj még
- 2015: Velem ma éjjel
- 2015: Gömbölyű
- 2017: Jericho

=== Chart-topping singles ===
Year	Song	Top position							Album
Year	Song	VIVA Chart	Class 40	MAHASZ Editors' Choice	MAHASZ Rádiós Top 40	MAHASZ Dance Top 40	MAHASZ Single (track) Top 10	EURO 200	Album
2012	Késő már	–	6	26	18	–	3	–	Enciklopédia
2013	Maradj még								
2015	Velem ma éjjel								
Summarization
Number 1. rank in numbers
Top 10 rankings		1	1						
Top 40 rankings		1	1	1	1				

== Theatre roles ==
From the Színházi adattár.

Play	Role	Theatre	Date	Reference
Gone With the Wind	Melanie Hamilton	Budapest Opera Theatre	30 December 2013	
Én, József Attila	Márta Vágó	Madách Theatre	10 February 2012	
Ghost	Molly Jensen	Budapest Opera Theatre	31 May 2013	
Mamma Mia!	Sophie Sheridan	Madách Theatre	26 September 2014	
Menyasszonytánc	Rózsi Patkó	Budapest Opera Theatre	24 November 2013	
Szegény gazdagok	Csárdásné	Attila József Theatre	9 October 2010	
Szép nyári nap	Ria	Budapest Opera Theatre	7 January 2015	

== See also ==
- X-Faktor 2011

== Further information ==
- Muri Enikő hivatalos honlapja
- Muri Enikő profilja a 2011-es X-Faktor hivatalos oldaláról
- Muri Enikő hivatalos Facebook-oldala
