= Miklós Malek (musician) =

Miklos Malek
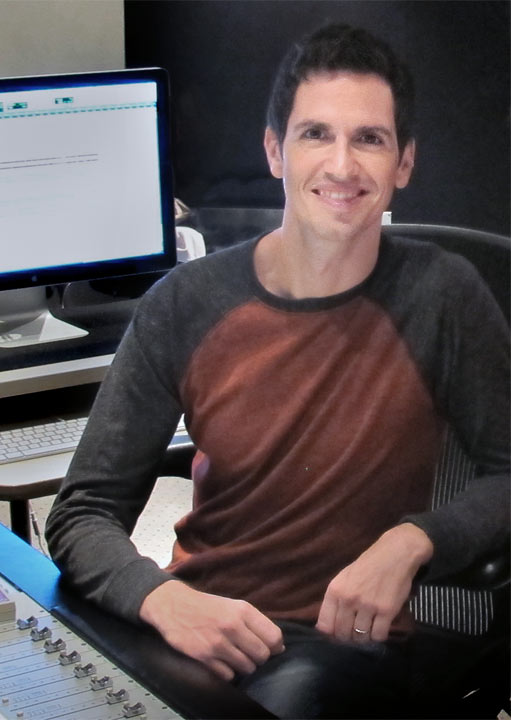
- Miklos at Westlake Studios

Background information
- Born: 15 April 1975 (age 51); Budapest, Hungary
- Genres: Pop, R&B, new-age, dance, electronic, classical-crossover
- Occupations: Music producer, songwriter, mixing & mastering engineer
- Years active: 1990–present
- Website: www.miklosmalek.com

Miklos Malek (in Hungarian ifjabb Malek Miklós) (born in Budapest, Hungary on 15 April 1975) is a Hungarian songwriter, music producer and artist and television personality, who is a resident of Los Angeles. He has produced for a number of renowned artists. He is also a judge and mentor in the Hungarian version of X-Faktor.

== Musical career ==
Los Angeles-based music producer, songwriter and mixing engineer Miklos Malek grew up in a family of renowned musicians in Budapest. After receiving a master's degree in classical piano at the Franz Liszt Academy of Music, he moved to the U.S. to study at Berklee College of Music. In the early 2000s, he moved to New York where he was signed as a songwriter to Notation Music Publishing which led to his breakthrough as a co-writer and arranger of Anastacia's "I Thought I Told You That" (featuring Faith Evans) and the opportunity to work on Jennifer Lopez' hit song "Love Don't Cost a Thing". During the following years, he also established himself as a music producer and mixing engineer working on projects such as Jessica Andrews, M2M, Dream, Sylvia Tosun, David Phelps, Marion Raven, Hiromi Go (Japan), Coco Lee, Plus One.

In 2006, Miklos moved to Los Angeles and launched his first studio in Hollywood called "Orange Room". Since then he has been working with a wide variety of US and international artists, including Pixie Lott (UK), Ayaka Hirahara (Japan), Sylwia Grzeszczak (Poland), Kat Graham, Justyna Steczkowska (Poland), Janice Dickinson, Táta Vega and Yanni, with whom Miklos has collaborated on 3 albums: Voices, Truth of Touch, and Yanni Live at El Morro, Puerto Rico.

In 2010, he became a judge in the Hungarian X-Faktor talent show and a mentor for the groups. In 2011, he returned to the show mentoring the "Over 25s" and Tibor Kocsis of his team won the second series. In 2012, his contestants took the 2nd (Tímea Antal) and 3rd (Adél Csobot) place. After, the third season of X-Faktor, Miklos decided to end his journey with the show and return to his studio in Los Angeles. Since then, he has been developing new artists in the U.S. and internationally. More recently he is working with new artist, Anika Wilmore. Miklos' work has been featured on over 15 million records.

== Personal life ==
Born in Budapest in 1975, he is the son of the famous classical composer Miklós Malek and pop singer and music teacher Mária Toldy. His sister Andrea Malek is also a singer and actress.

== Selected discography ==
- Anastacia: "I Thought I Told You That " arranger, co-writer, all instruments on
- Ayaka Hirahara: "Stars", "Wedding Song", "Overnight Sensation" mixing engineer
- Astraea: "Dirty Blond", "Lady Boy" arranger. co-writer, producer
- David Phelps: "Revelation" co-writer of "Heart of Hearts"
- Dream: "It Was All a Dream" arranger, programmer, keyboards on "I don't Like Anyone"
- Ginuwine: "the Life" keyboards, programmer on "Just Because"
- Hiromi Go: "Evolution" arranger
- Jennifer Lopez: "JLO" keyboards, programmer on"Love Don't Cost a Thing"
- Jeniffer Lopez: "Love Don't Cost a Thing" keyboards, programmer on"Love Don't Cost a Thing" (RJ Schoolyard Mix)
- Jessica Andrews: "Who I Am" co-writer of "Now I Know"
- Justyna Steczkowska: "Prosze Cie Sklam" drum programmer
- Kat Graham: "Down Like That" co-writer, co-producer, recording, mixing and mastering engineer
- LMNT: "All Sides" keyboards and programming on "It's Your Love"
- M2M: "What Do You Do About Me" Remix, mixing engineer of "What You Do About Me", "Everything" ( Dace Remix)
- M2M: "The Big Room" remixer, keyboards, guitars, bass on "What You Do About Me", "Everything", "Don't", keyboards on "Miss Popular"
- Pixie Lott "Turn It Up" synth programmer on "Jack"
- Plus One: "Obvious" producer, arranger, keyboards, guitars, mixing engineer on "Kick Me"
- Sylwia Grzeszczak: "Komponujac Siebie" mastering engineer of whole album
- Savannah Phillips: "Middle Finger High" mixing and mastering engineer
- Yanni: "Truth of Touch" co-writer, arranger of "Truth of Touch", "Seasons", "Voyage", "Flash of Color", "Vertigo"
- Yanni: "Voices" co-writer, arranger of "1001", "Our Days"
- Yanni:"Live at El Morro Puerto Rico" co-writer, arranger of "Truth of Touch", "Voyage", "Vertigo"
- TRF: Tribute Album Best, "Overnight Sensation" mixing engineer

== Filmography ==
- The Butterfly Effect 3: Revelations: "Rewind" music producer, arranger, mixing engineer
- Bedazzled: "Tell Me Girlfriend" co-writer, music producer, performer, arranger, mixing engineer
- WTC View: "Tell Me Girlfriend" co-writer, music producer, performer, arranger, mixing engineer
- Friends: "Tell Me Girlfriend" co-writer, music producer, performer, arranger, mixing engineer
- Satan's School for Girls: "Tell Me Girlfriend" co-writer, music producer, performer, arranger, mixing engineer
- Prison Break composer, music producer, performer, arranger, mixing engineer
- Dawson's Creek: "We Belong" co-writer, producer, arranger, mixing engineer
- Dragon Age II mixing engineer of soundtrack
- El Camino co-producer, recording and mixing engineer of the filmscore
- Emporio Armani composed, produced, arranged, mixing engineer
- Slingers co-producer, recording and mixing engineer of the filmscore
- The Elephant King played acoustic and electric guitars on the soundtrack
- The L Word, television drama series
- X-Faktor Judge/mentor on the X-Factor TV show, Hungarian edition: season 1, 2 and 3
