= Kati Wolf =

Hungarian singer

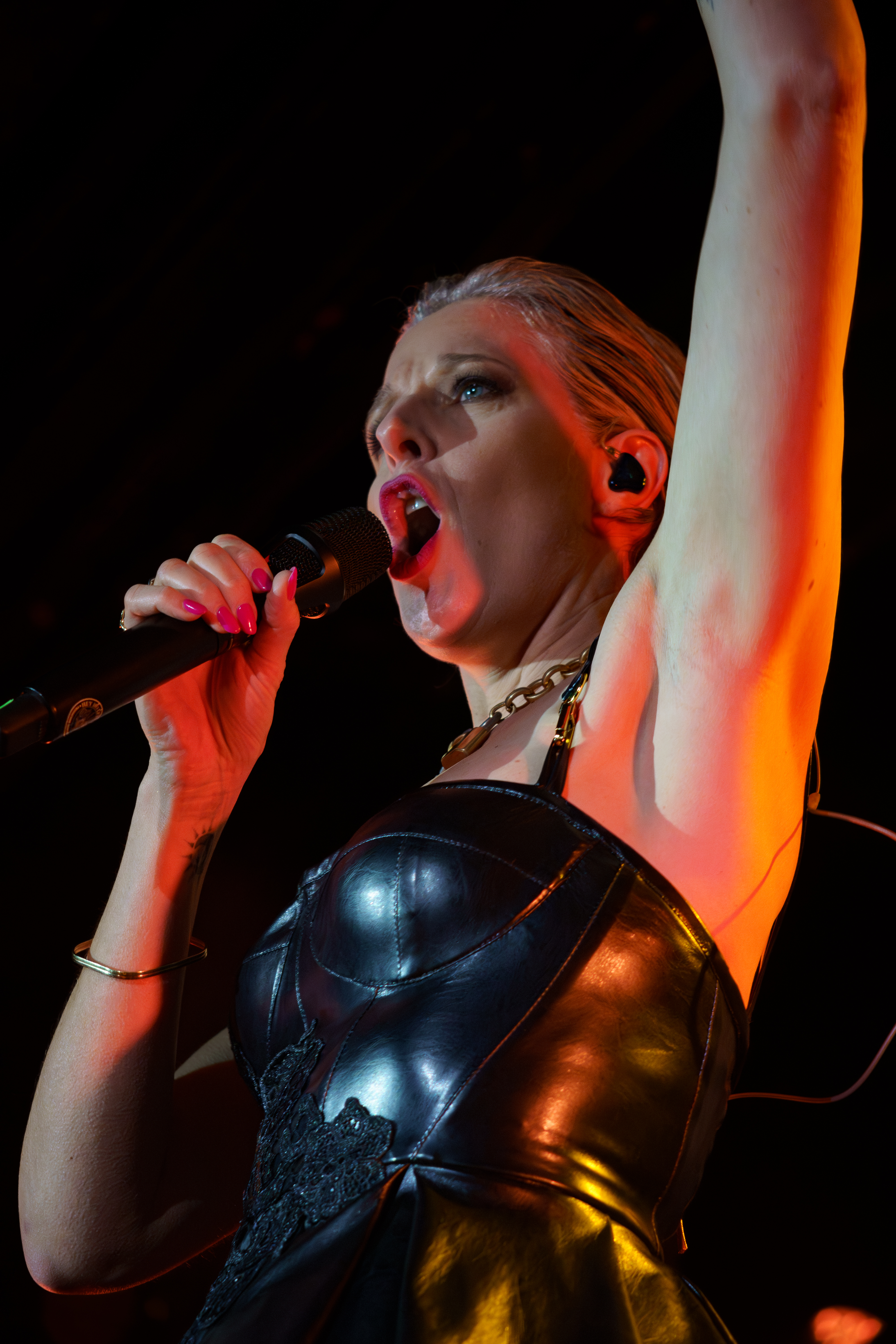
- Wolf in 2024

Background information
- Born: Katalin Wolf; 24 September 1974 (age 52); Szentendre, Hungary
- Genre: Pop
- Years active: 1982–present
- Label: Sony Music Hungary

Kati Wolf (born 24 September 1974) is a Hungarian singer, songwriter, musician, actress, socialite, media personality. Wolf represented Hungary at the Eurovision Song Contest 2011 with the song "What About My Dreams?".

At the age of seven, Wolf sang the title track for the popular Hungarian cartoon Vuk. Besides singing, she also took piano and jazz dance classes. After her graduation as solfège teacher, chorus master at the Hungarian Music Academy, she worked with numerous bands in different genres. Her breakthrough came in 2010 as a finalist of the Hungarian version of the talent show X-Faktor. Prior to X-Faktor she worked as an airline purser.

On 10 December 2014, it was announced that Wolf would take part in A Dal, the national selection implemented the year after she participated, with the song "Ne engedj el!" in hopes of representing Hungary in the Eurovision Song Contest 2015. She was previously a judge in the 2012 edition of the national final. Kati got to the final, but did not qualify for the superfinal.

== Discography ==
=== Albums ===
- Wolf-áramlat (2009)
- Az első X — 10 dal az élő showból (2011)
- Vár a holnap (2011)

=== Charted singles ===
Year	Title	Peak chart positions					Certifications	Album
Year	Title	AUS	BEL Tip	SWI	UK	HUN	Certifications	Album
2011	"What About My Dreams?"	47	45	53	128	1		Vár a Holnap
2012	"Lángolj"	-	-	-	-	15		Vár a Holnap
2012	"Az aki voltam (The Last Time)"	-	-	-	-	29		Vár a Holnap

=== Other single releases ===
- "Vuk dala" (1981)

Awards and achievements
Preceded by Zoli Ádok with "Dance with Me"	Hungary in the Eurovision Song Contest; 2011	Succeeded by Compact Disco with "Sound of Our Hearts"
