= Roland Gulyás =

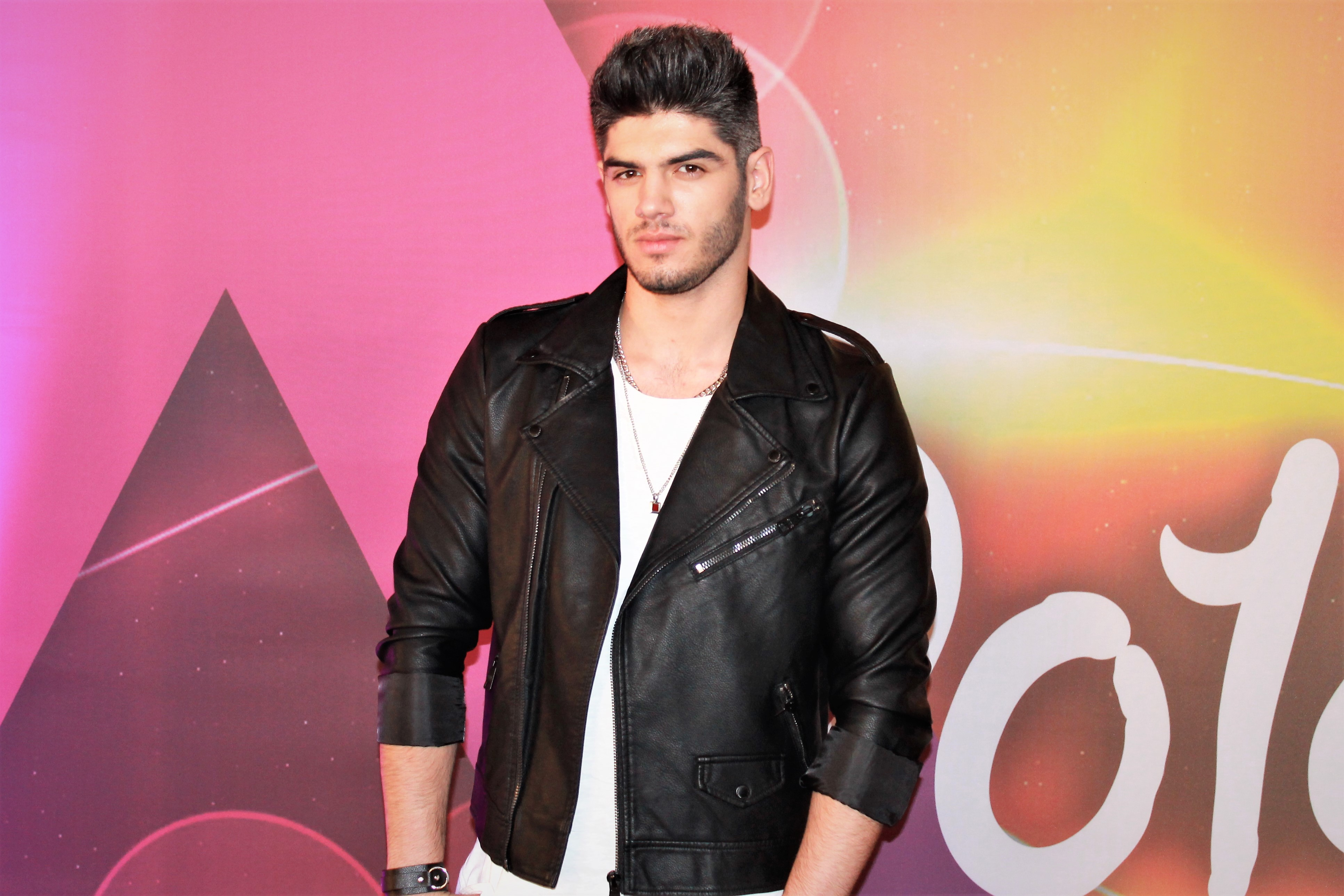
- Gulyás in 2018

Background information
- Born: 20 March 1997 (age 28); Sátoraljaújhely, Hungary
- Occupation: Singer
- Instrument: vocals
- Years active: 2017–present

Roland Gulyás (born 19 March 1997, Sátoraljaújhely) is a Hungarian singer, notable for coming in third place of the seventh series of Hungarian X-Faktor under the guidance of judge Gigi Radics and for his well-publicized relationship with fellow contestant Serena Rigacci. He participated in A Dal 2018, the Hungarian selection for the Eurovision Song Contest 2018 with the song "H Y P N O T I Z E D", composed by former Hungarian Eurovision participant ByeAlex. He was eliminated in the semi-finals.
