= Nagyvarsány =

Coordinates: 48°10′N 22°17′E

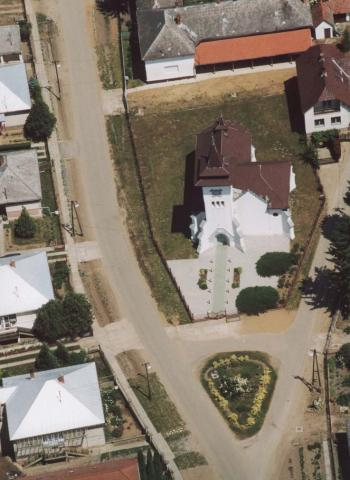

- Country: Hungary
- County: Szabolcs-Szatmár-Bereg

Area
  - Total: 12.54 km^{2} (4.84 sq mi)

Population (2015)
  - Total: 1,454
  - Density: 115.9/km^{2} (300/sq mi)
- Time zone: UTC+1 (CET)
  - Summer (DST): UTC+2 (CEST)
- Postal code: 4812
- Area code: 45

Nagyvarsány is a village in Szabolcs-Szatmár-Bereg county, in the Northern Great Plain region of eastern Hungary.

Jews lived in Nagyvarsány for many years until they were murdered in the Holocaust. There is still a Jewish cemetery in the village.

== Geography ==
It covers an area of 12.54 km^{2} (5 sq mi) and has a population of 1,454 people (2015).
