= Bagossy Brothers Company =

Hungarian rock band

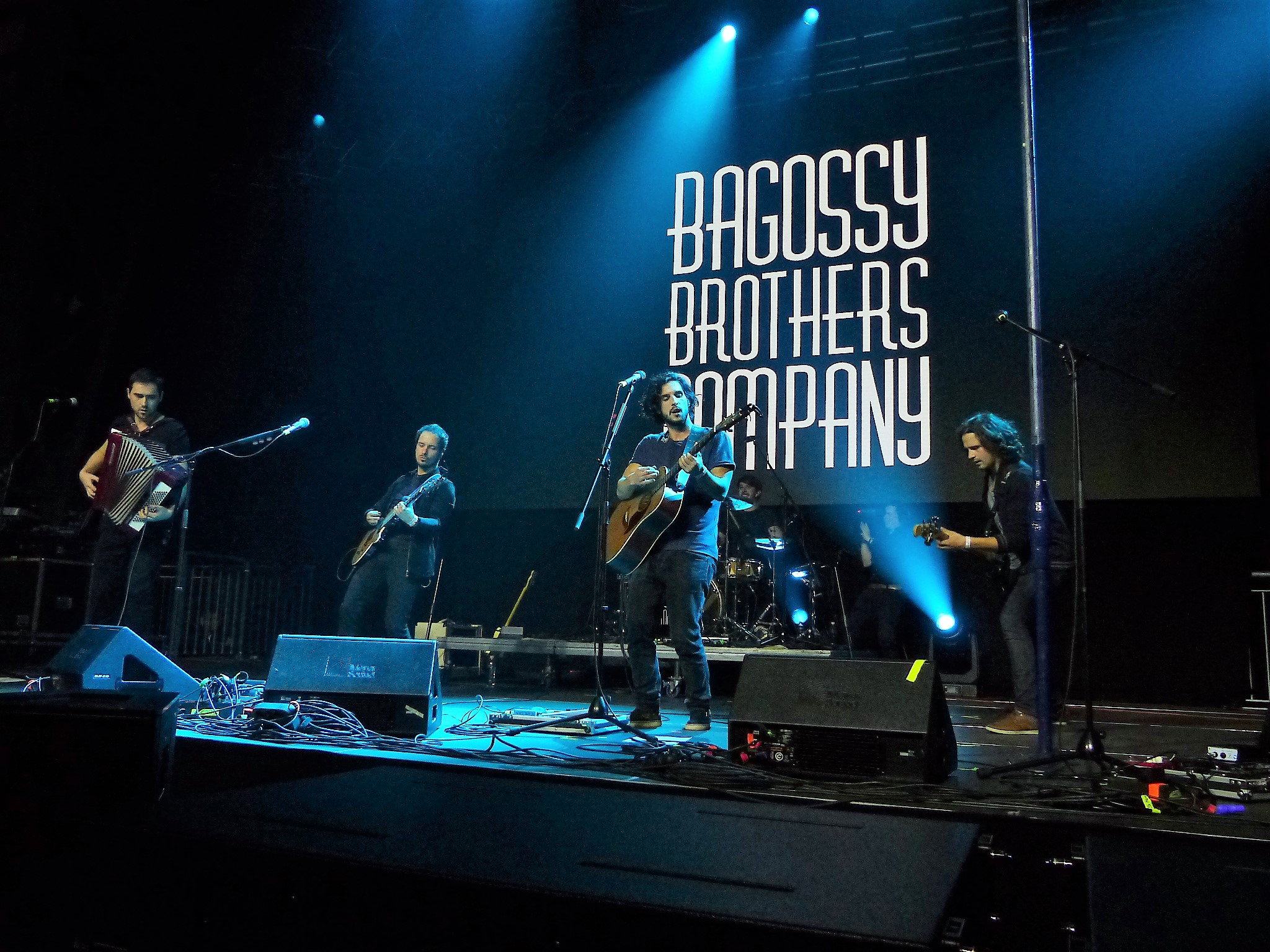
- Public concert of the band in Budapest, Hungary in 2017.

Background information
- Origin: Hungary
- Genres: Folk rock, pop rock, indie folk, indie rock, electronic, alternative rock
- Years active: 2013–present
- Label: Prime Events Management
- Members: Norbert Bagossy; László Bagossy; Szilárd Bartis; Attila Tatár; Zsombor Kozma
- Website: bagossybrotherscompany.com

Bagossy Brothers Company is a Hungarian (Székely) pop rock, alternative rock, folk rock, and indie folk band, founded in 2013 in Gyergyószentmiklós (Romanian: Gheorgheni), Harghita County, Transylvania, Romania.

== History ==
The band was founded in 11th May 2013 in Gyergyószentmiklós (Romanian: Gheorgheni), Harghita County, Transylvania, Romania, with the help of musicians who have been playing together for several years. The band's name was inspired by the family names of the Bagossy brothers (Norbert Bagossy and László Bagossy).

In 2021 The Bagossy Brothers Company won Petőfi Music Awards in three categories.

== Members ==
- Norbert Bagossy - vocals / guitar
- László Bagossy - bass / backing vocals
- Attila Tatár - guitars / backing vocals
- Zsombor Kozma - keyboards / accordion / violin
- Szilárd Bartis - drums / percussion
