= Tibor Kocsis =

Hungarian pop singer (born 1981)

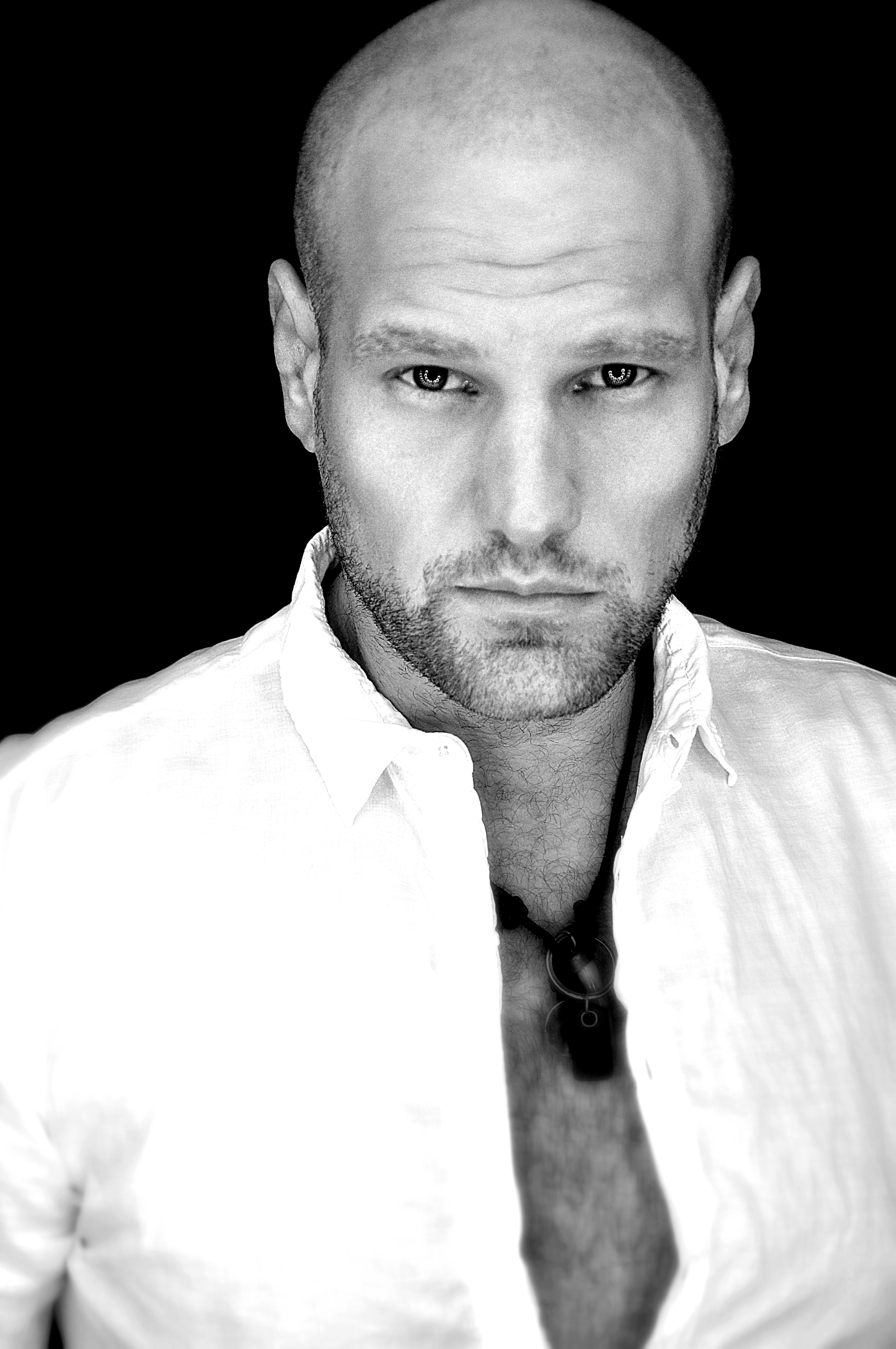

Background information
- Born: 1 September 1981 (age 43); Kecskemét, Hungary
- Occupation: Singer
- Instrument: Vocals
- Years active: 2011–present

Tibor Kocsis is a Hungarian pop singer, who won the second series of the Hungarian X-Faktor broadcast on the RTL Klub Hungarian television station, with the final broadcast on 18 December 2011. Kocsis was in the "Over 25" category and was mentored by Miklós Malek Jr. winning over other finalist and eventual runner-up Enikő Muri.

== Personal life ==
Kocsis came out as gay in October 2021.

== See also ==
- Hungarian pop

Preceded by Csaba Vastag	X-Faktor (Hungary); Winner; 2011	Succeeded by Gergő Oláh (singer)
