= Csaba Vastag =

Hungarian musician (born 1982)

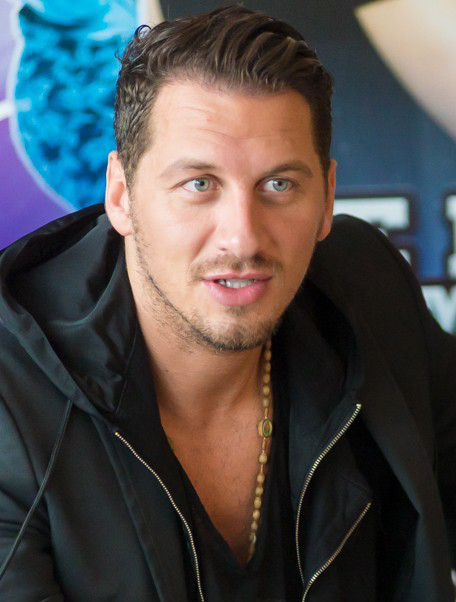
- Csaba Vastag in 2015

Background information
- Born: Csaba Vastag; 11 February 1982 (age 44); Budapest, Hungary
- Occupation: Singer
- Instrument: Vocals
- Years active: 2000–present

Csaba Vastag (born 11 February 1982 in Budapest) is a Hungarian musician, who won the first ever series of the Hungarian X-Faktor in 2010.

== Early years ==
Csaba is one of three brothers, the others being Balázs and Tamás. At age 11 he became an acrobatic rock and roll dancer, and later became lead singer of rock band touring several European countries. In 2000 he graduated from Veszprém Secondary School and enrolled in Veszprém's University of Pannonia (Pannon Egyetem university). He also had vocal training under the supervision of Judit Kővári. In 2001 he took part in a Hungarian production of Hair directed by Mészáros Árpád Zsolt. Vastag played the role of Aquarius in the musical theater piece. His first chart break came in 2008 when he reached No. 4 on the Hungarian Singles Chart.

== X-Faktor ==
In 2010, both Csaba Vastag and younger brother Tamás Vastag became Top 12 finalists on the first ever Hungarian X-Faktor series competition, both reaching Top 5 in week 8, when both became bottom two and Tamás was eliminated. In week 9, Csaba Vastag yet again was voted bottom two but was saved this time as well against opponent Veca Janicsák. After coming bottom two in two consecutive weeks, he went on to win the contest in the 19 December 2010 final against the other two Top 3 finalists Nikolas Takács (runner-up) and Norbi L. Király (3rd).

== Discography ==
- A második X (2011)
- Conecto (2013)

| Preceded by None | X-Faktor (Hungary); Winner; 2010 | Succeeded by Tibor Kocsis |
