= Hungary in the Eurovision Song Contest 2005 =

- Eurovision Song Contest 2005
- Participating broadcaster: Magyar Televízió (MTV)
- Country: Hungary
- Selection process: Eurovíziós Dalfesztivál
- Selection date: 13 March 2005

Competing entry
- Song: "Forogj, világ!"
- Artist: Nox
- Songwriters: Szabolcs Harmath; Attila Valla

Placement
- Semi-final result: Qualified (5th, 167 points)
- Final result: 12th, 97 points

Participation chronology

Hungary was represented at the Eurovision Song Contest 2005 with the song "Forogj, világ!", composed by Szabolcs Harmath, with lyrics by Attila Valla, and performed by the band Nox. The Hungarian participating broadcaster, Magyar Televízió (MTV), selected its entry through the national final Eurovíziós Dalfesztivál. The broadcaster returned to the contest after a six-year absence following its withdrawal in 1999. 12 entries competed in the national final where four of the entries proceeded to a second round of voting based entirely on a public televote. In the second round of voting, a five-member jury panel selected "Forogj, világ!" performed by Nox as the winner.

Hungary competed in the semi-final of the Eurovision Song Contest which took place on 19 May 2005. Performing during the show in position 17, "Forogj, világ!" was announced among the top 10 entries of the semi-final and therefore qualified to compete in the final on 21 May. It was later revealed that Hungary placed fifth out of the 25 participating countries in the semi-final with 167 points. In the final, Hungary performed in position 1 and placed twelfth out of the 24 participating countries, scoring 97 points.

== Background ==
Prior to the 2005 contest, Magyar Televízió (MTV) had participated in the Eurovision Song Contest representing Hungary four times since its first entry in 1994. Its best placing in the contest was fourth, achieved with its début entry in 1994 with the song "Kinek mondjam el vétkeimet?" performed by Friderika Bayer. It had attempted to participate in the contest in 1993, however, its entry was eliminated in the preselection show Kvalifikacija za Millstreet. After placing twenty-third with the song "A holnap már nem lesz szomorú" performed by Charlie in 1998, the broadcaster withdrew from the contest since 1999.

As part of its duties as participating broadcaster, MTV organises the selection of its entry in the Eurovision Song Contest and broadcasts the event in the country. The broadcaster confirmed its intentions to participate at the 2005 contest on 5 December 2004 following its six-year absence. MTV had initially intended to enter in 2004 but later postponed its participation due to a lack of time to select an entry for the contest. The broadcaster has organised both internal selections and national selection shows to select its entries in the past. It opted to organize a national selection show for 2005 with details being released on 14 February 2005.

== Before Eurovision ==
=== Eurovíziós Dalfesztivál ===
Eurovíziós Dalfesztivál was the national final organised by MTV to select its entry for the Eurovision Song Contest 2005. Twelve entries competed in the competition which took place at the MTV studios in Budapest and was hosted by Tünde Nagy. The show was broadcast on MTV as well as online at video.hirado.hu.

==== Format ====
The competition consisted of one show, held on 13 March 2005, and featured twelve entries. The winning entry was selected over two rounds of voting. In the first round of voting, a public televote through telephone or SMS exclusively determined the top four entries that qualified to the second round of voting. In the second round, a five-member jury panel determined the winning entry. Each juror assigned scores to each entry ranging from 1 (lowest score) to 10 (highest score) and the summation of the jury scores determined the final results for the second round.

The jury panel consisted of:

- István Verebes – Jászai Mari award-winning actor and director
- László Benkő – composer, keyboardist for the Hungarian band Omega
- Zsolt Jeszenszky – President of Mahasz
- Csaba Pindroch – actor
- Réka Acél – actress and presenter

==== Competing entries ====
Artists and composers were able to submit their applications and entries for the competition between 14 February 2005 and 25 February 2005. Only artists that had a valid contract with a record company/professional management or had released a record were eligible to compete. All songs were required to be submitted in Hungarian, however, a translation of the lyrics to English and French were also required. After the submission deadline had passed, 37 entries were received by the broadcaster. A five-member preselection jury selected twelve entries for the competition. The jury consisted of István Verebes, László Benkő, Zsolt Jeszenszky, Csaba Pindroch and Réka Aczél. The competing entries were announced on 9 March 2005.

==== Final ====
The final took place on 13 March 2005 where twelve entries competed. The winner of the competition was selected over two rounds of voting. In the first round, a public televote consisting of votes submitted through telephone and SMS determined the top four entries that advanced to the second round. In the second round, the combination of scores from a jury selected "Forogj, világ!" performed by Nox as the winner.

Final – 13 March 2005
R/O	Artist	Song	Songwriter(s)	Result
1	Acapulco	"Szép ez a világ"	Kálmán Müller, Pál Kis	—N/a
2	Judy	"Holnaptól"	Ágnes Szabó, Norbert Szũcs	Advanced
3	Melody Island	"Eltűnt álom"	Zsolt Bácksay	—N/a
4	Crystal	"Összetört a szívem"	Tibor Kasza, Tamás Orbán	Advanced
5	Emi Bizek	"Túl az út felén"	Ágnes Szabó, Emi Bizek, Viktor Rakonczai	—N/a
6	Karányi	"Álomszép"	J. Daniel Karányi	—N/a
7	Sushi Train	"Húzz közel"	Zsusa Pálos, Tamás Vághy	—N/a
8	Baby Gabi and Lala	"Van egy kulcs"	Zoltán Makai, Zsolt Kárpáti, Tamás Kelemen, János Bende	Advanced
9	Rita Ambrus	"Együtt"	Rita Ambrus, Stefano Favaro	—N/a
10	Nox	"Forogj, világ!"	Attila Valla, Szabolcs Harmath	Advanced
11	Tamás Mester	"Szabadítsd fel"	David Coburn, Tamás Mester	—N/a
12	Lola	"Szerelem"	Attila Valla, Viktor Rakonczai	—N/a

Superfinal – 13 March 2005
R/O	Artist	Song	Points	Place
1	Judy	"Holnaptól"	43	2
2	Crystal	"Összetört a szívem"	36	3
3	Baby Gabi and Lala	"Van egy kulcs"	33	4
4	Nox	"Forogj, világ!"	49	1

== At Eurovision ==
According to Eurovision rules, all nations with the exceptions of the host country, the "Big Four" (France, Germany, Spain and the United Kingdom) and the ten highest placed finishers in the 2004 contest are required to qualify from the semi-final on 19 May 2005 in order to compete for the final on 21 May 2005; the top ten countries from the semi-final progress to the final. On 22 March 2005, a special allocation draw was held which determined the running order for the semi-final and Hungary was set to perform in position 15, following the entry from Romania and before the entry from Finland.

The semi-final and the final were broadcast in Hungary on MTV with commentary by Zsuzsa Demcsák, András Fáber and Dávid Szántó. MTV appointed Zsuzsa Demcsák as its spokesperson to announce the Hungarian votes during the final.

=== Semi-final ===
Nox took part in technical rehearsals on 13 and 15 May, followed by dress rehearsals on 18 and 19 May. The Hungarian performance featured lead vocalist Szilvia Péter Szabó dressed all in black, with the rest of the band performing a traditional Hungarian folk dance for the entirety of the performance.

At the end of the show, Hungary was announced among the top 10 entries in the semi-final and therefore qualified to compete in the final. It was later revealed that Hungary placed fifth in the semi-final, receiving a total of 167 points.

=== Final ===
Shortly after the semi-final, a winners' press conference was held for the ten qualifying countries. As part of this press conference, the qualifying artists took part in a draw to determine the running order position in which they would perform in for the final. Hungary was subsequently drawn to open the show in position number 1, before the entry from the United Kingdom.

Nox once again took part in dress rehearsals prior to the final and performed a repeat of their semi-final performance during the final on 21 May. Hungary placed twelfth in the final, scoring 97 points. This was, at the time, Hungary's second best result since the country's debut appearance in 1994.

=== Voting ===
In line with the voting system in place at the time, the Hungarian voting results for the Eurovision Song Contest 2005 were determined via 100% public televoting from viewers across Hungary. In the semi-final, the country awarded its twelve points to Romania, while in the final, Hungary awarded maximum twelve points to eventual winners of the contest, Greece. In the semi-final, Nox received the maximum twelve points from Poland, the highest mark awarded to the band in the contest.

==== Points awarded to Hungary ====
Points awarded to Hungary (Semi-final)
Score	Country
12 points	Poland
10 points	Romania; Ukraine
8 points	Croatia; Israel; Serbia and Montenegro; Turkey
7 points	Austria; Bulgaria; Iceland; Portugal; Russia
6 points	Belgium; Cyprus; Norway
5 points	Finland; Greece; Latvia
4 points	Belarus; Estonia; France; Macedonia; Slovenia
3 points	Bosnia and Herzegovina; Spain; Sweden
2 points	Malta
1 point	Andorra; Denmark; Switzerland; United Kingdom

Points awarded to Hungary (Final)
Score	Country
12 points	
10 points	Poland
8 points	Israel; Romania
7 points	Cyprus
6 points	Andorra; Croatia; Iceland; Serbia and Montenegro; Turkey
5 points	Bulgaria; Spain
4 points	
3 points	Estonia; France; Latvia; Russia
2 points	Belarus; Belgium; Greece; Portugal; Ukraine
1 point	Bosnia and Herzegovina; Macedonia

==== Points awarded by Hungary ====
Points awarded by Hungary (Semi-final)
Score	Country
12 points	Romania
10 points	Ireland
8 points	Croatia
7 points	Denmark
6 points	Moldova
5 points	Israel
4 points	Poland
3 points	Switzerland
2 points	Slovenia
1 point	Estonia

Points awarded by Hungary (Final)
Score	Country
12 points	Greece
10 points	Romania
8 points	Israel
7 points	Croatia
6 points	Denmark
5 points	Malta
4 points	Moldova
3 points	Switzerland
2 points	Serbia and Montenegro
1 point	Latvia
