= Fehérvári =

Fehérvári or Fehervari is a surname. Notable people with the surname include:

- Alfréd Fehérvári (1925–2007), Hungarian football player
- Gábor Fehérvári (born 1990), Hungarian singer, known as Freddie
- Gabriel Fehervari (born 1960), Belgian businessman
- Vince Fehérvári, Australian sprint canoeist
