= Joci Pápai =

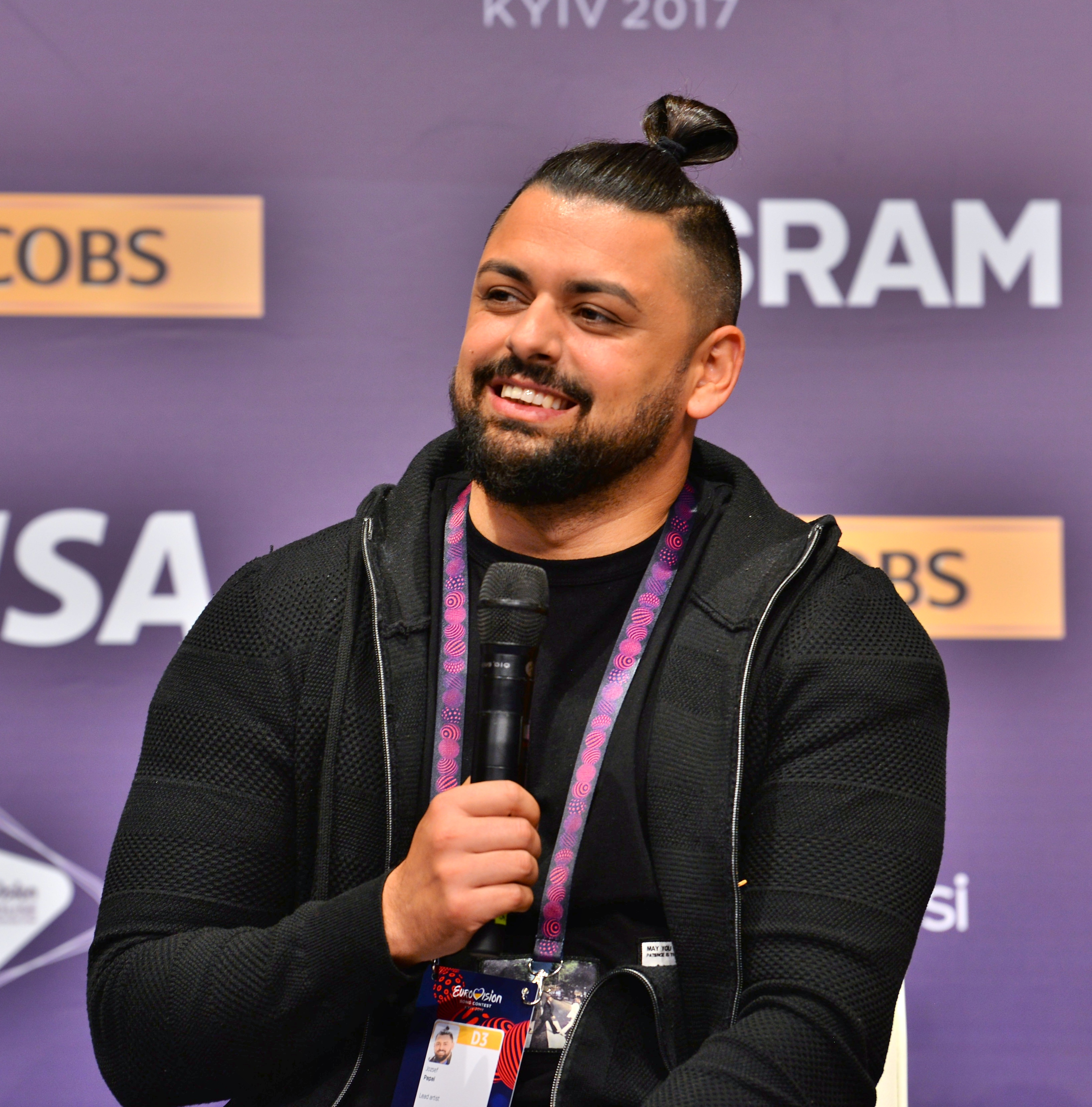
- Pápai in 2017

Background information
- Born: József Pápai; 22 September 1981 (age 44); Tata, Hungary
- Genres: Romani music; traditional folk; hip hop; pop; rock; soul; R&B
- Occupations: Singer; actor; rapper; guitarist
- Instruments: Vocals; guitar
- Years active: 2005–present

József "Joci" Pápai (Hungarian: [ˈjot͡si ˈpaːpɒi]; born 22 September 1981) is a Hungarian singer, rapper and guitarist of Romani descent. He represented Hungary at the Eurovision Song Contest 2017 with the song "Origo" finishing in 8th place. He represented Hungary again at the Eurovision Song Contest 2019 with the song "Az én apám". However he failed to qualify for the grand final being the first Hungarian entry not to since returning in 2011.

== Career ==
Pápai came into contact with music early as his older brother had started writing songs and playing guitar at the age of four. He was influenced by music of the 1960s and 1970s, and rock, pop, soul, and R&B music. His public debut was in 2005, when he was a part of the second season of the TV2 show Megasztár, where he was eliminated in the consolation rounds, but was interviewed by the Budapest daily tabloid Blikk. Afterwards, he started to produce his official debut.

His first big success was Ne nézz így rám. In 2006, he collaborated with his then-roommate, rapper Majka with Nélküled and Nekem ez jár, but his greatest success came in 2015 with Mikor a test örexik. He then released a song in collaboration with Caramel and Zé Szabó titled Elrejtett világ. His last collaboration with Majka appeared together with the pop-funk song Senki más.

On 8 December 2016, it was announced that Pápai would be one of the thirty acts participating in the 2017 edition of A Dal, the national selection for Hungary in the Eurovision Song Contest 2017 with the self-penned "Origo", in which he progressed to the final and won the competition, giving him the right to represent Hungary in the Eurovision Song Contest 2017, coming in 8th place overall. He competed again in the 2019 edition, with the song "Az én apám". He won that as well and represented Hungary again at the Eurovision Song Contest 2019 in Tel Aviv, Israel. This time, however, he failed to qualify from the semifinal.

Following his Eurovision 2019 participation, Pápai moved away from the apartment him and Majka were renting, but the two remained close friends.

== Discography ==
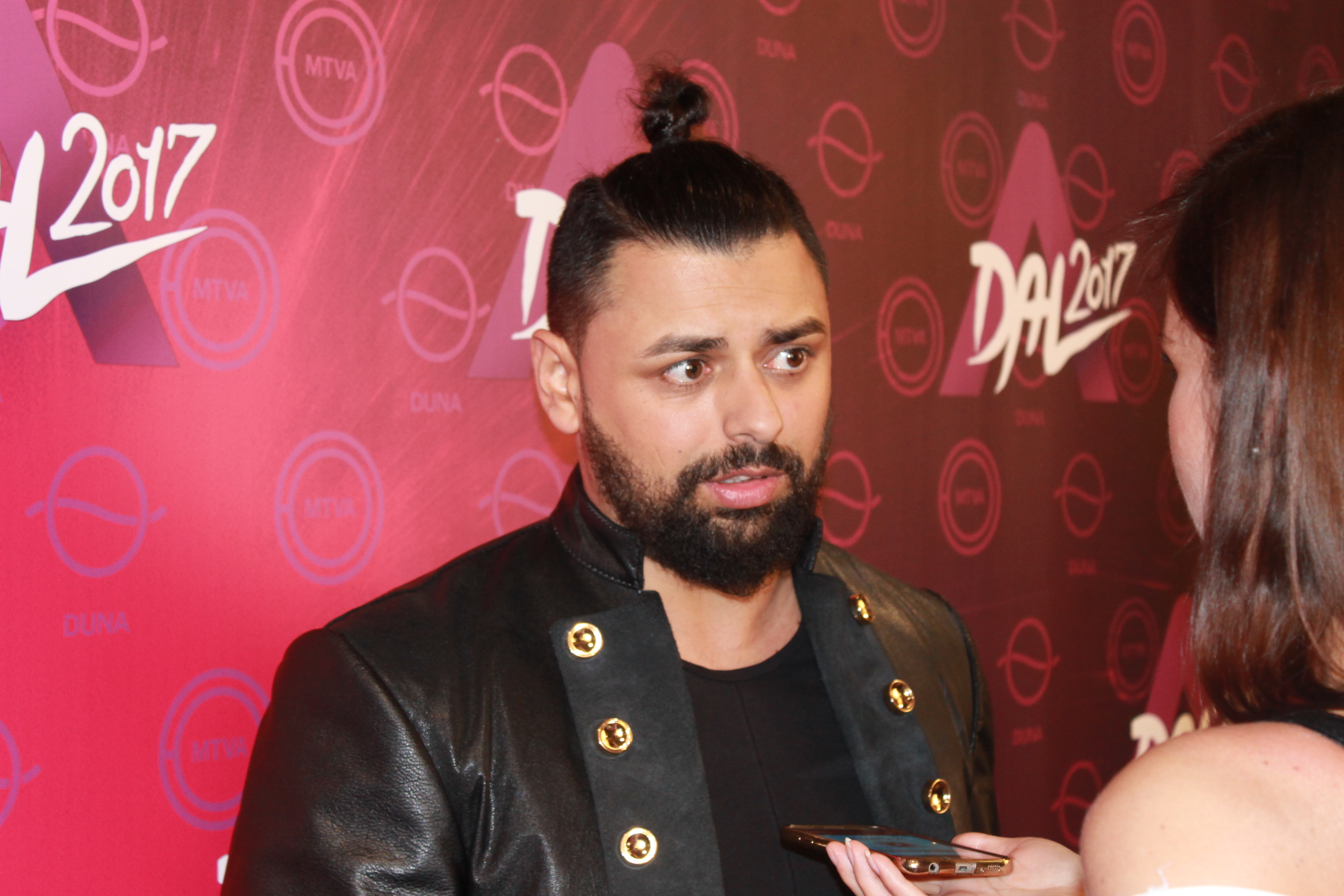
Joci Pápai being interviewed after the first semi-final of A Dal 2017, 10 February 2017.

=== Studio albums ===
Title	Details
Vigaszdíj	Released: 29 August 2005; Label: Magneoton; Formats: CD, CD/DVD, digital download

=== Singles ===
==== As lead artist ====
Title	Year	Peak chart positions			Album
Title	Year	HUN	SWE	SWI	Album
"Ne nézz így rám"	2010	2	—	—	Vigaszdíj
"Nélküled" (with Majka and Tyson)	2010	—	—	—	Vigaszdíj
"Rabolj el örökre"	2011	—	—	—	Non-album singles
"Nekem ez jár" (with Majka, Curtis, and BLR)	2013	5	—	—	Non-album singles
"Mikor a test örexik" (with Majka)	2015	2	—	—	Non-album singles
"Elrejtett világ" (with Caramel and Zé Szabó)	2015	—	—	—	Non-album singles
"Senki más" (with Majka)	2016	25	—	—	Non-album singles
"Origo"	2017	2	97	70	Non-album singles
"Özönvíz"	2017	1	—	—	Non-album singles
"Távol"	2018	11	—	—	Non-album singles
"Látomás"	2018	12	—	—	Non-album singles
"Kirakós"	2018	26	—	—	Non-album singles
"Az én apám"	2018	2	—	—	Non-album singles
"—" denotes a recording that did not chart or was not released in that territory.

==== As featured artist ====
Title	Year	Peak chart positions	Album
Title	Year	HUN	Album
"Bom Chicka Wah Wah" (Majka feat. Tyson & Joci Pápai)	2011	—	Non-album single
"Irány Sopron" (Majka & Curtis feat Joci Pápai)	2018	12	Non-album single
"—" denotes a recording that did not chart or was not released in that territory.

== See also ==
- A Dal 2017

Awards and achievements
Preceded by Freddie with "Pioneer"	Hungary in the Eurovision Song Contest; 2017	Succeeded by AWS with "Viszlát nyár"
Preceded by AWS with "Viszlát nyár"	Hungary in the Eurovision Song Contest; 2019	Succeeded by None (Hungary withdrew from the contest)
