= AWS (band) =

Hungarian post-hardcore band

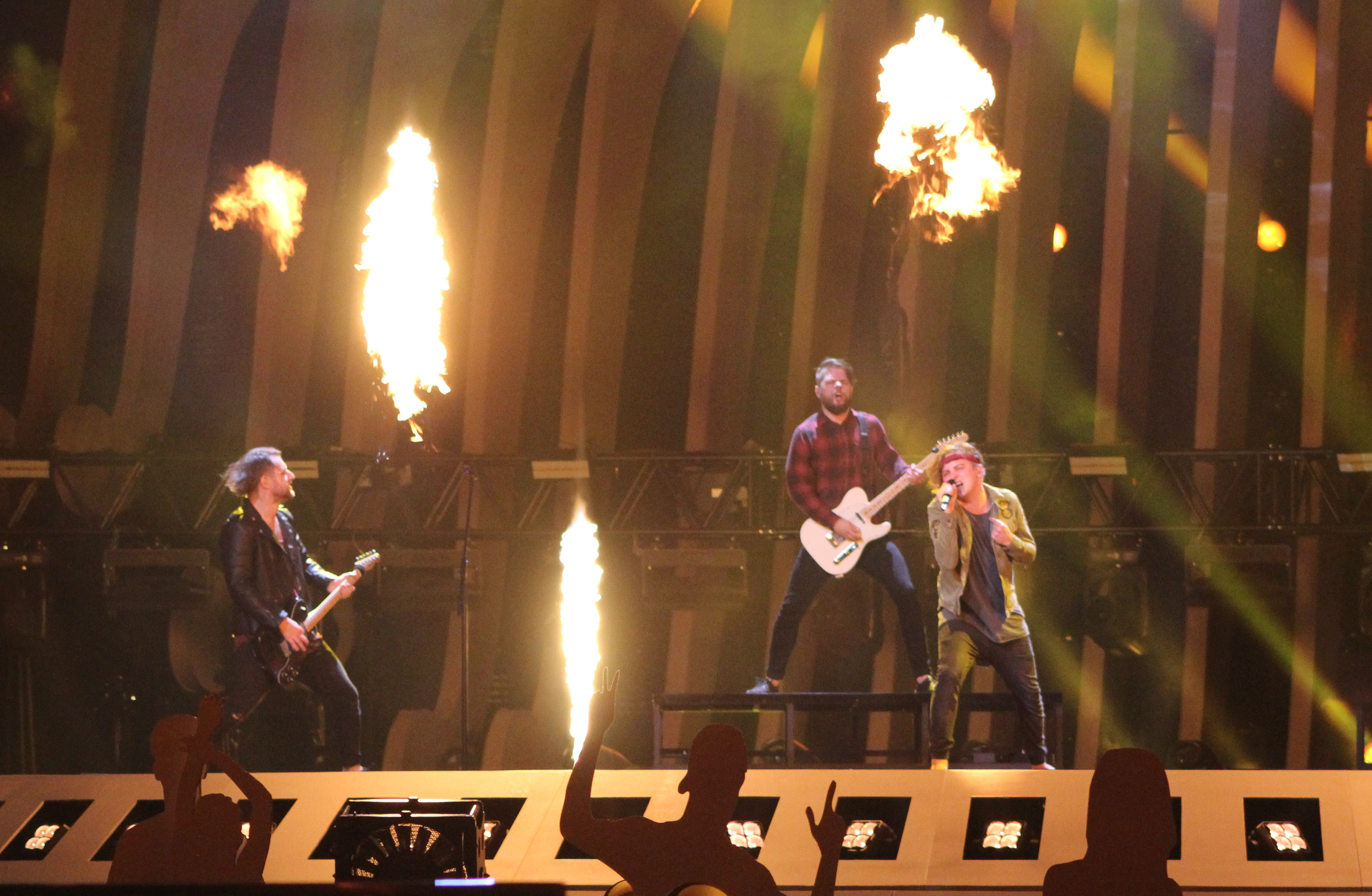
- AWS performing at Eurovision Song Contest 2018

Background information
- Origin: Budakeszi, Hungary
- Genres: Post-hardcore; metalcore; alternative metal; alternative rock
- Years active: 2006–present
- Label: EDGE Records
- Members: Bence Brucker; Dániel Kökényes; Áron Veress; Soma Schiszler; Tamás Stefán
- Past members: Marcell Varga; Gergő Varga; Bence Petrik; Ákos Lukács; Örs Siklósi

AWS (pronounced ah-vi-esh) is a Hungarian post-hardcore band formed in early November 2006 by Örs Siklósi (September 4, 1991 – February 5, 2021), Bence Brucker, Dániel Kökényes, Soma Schiszler and Áron Veress. Their music is characterized by diversity, powerful performances, and sudden changes, which utilizes metal, psychedelic rock, alternative and post-rock styles. Up to now, they have released five studio albums, two live albums and fourteen video clips. Their music videos often have juxtapositions of images of violence and celebrities in order to bring light to problems that the world faces, exhibiting what they call being "anti-celebrity". They represented Hungary at the Eurovision Song Contest 2018 in Portugal with the song "Viszlát nyár".

== Career ==
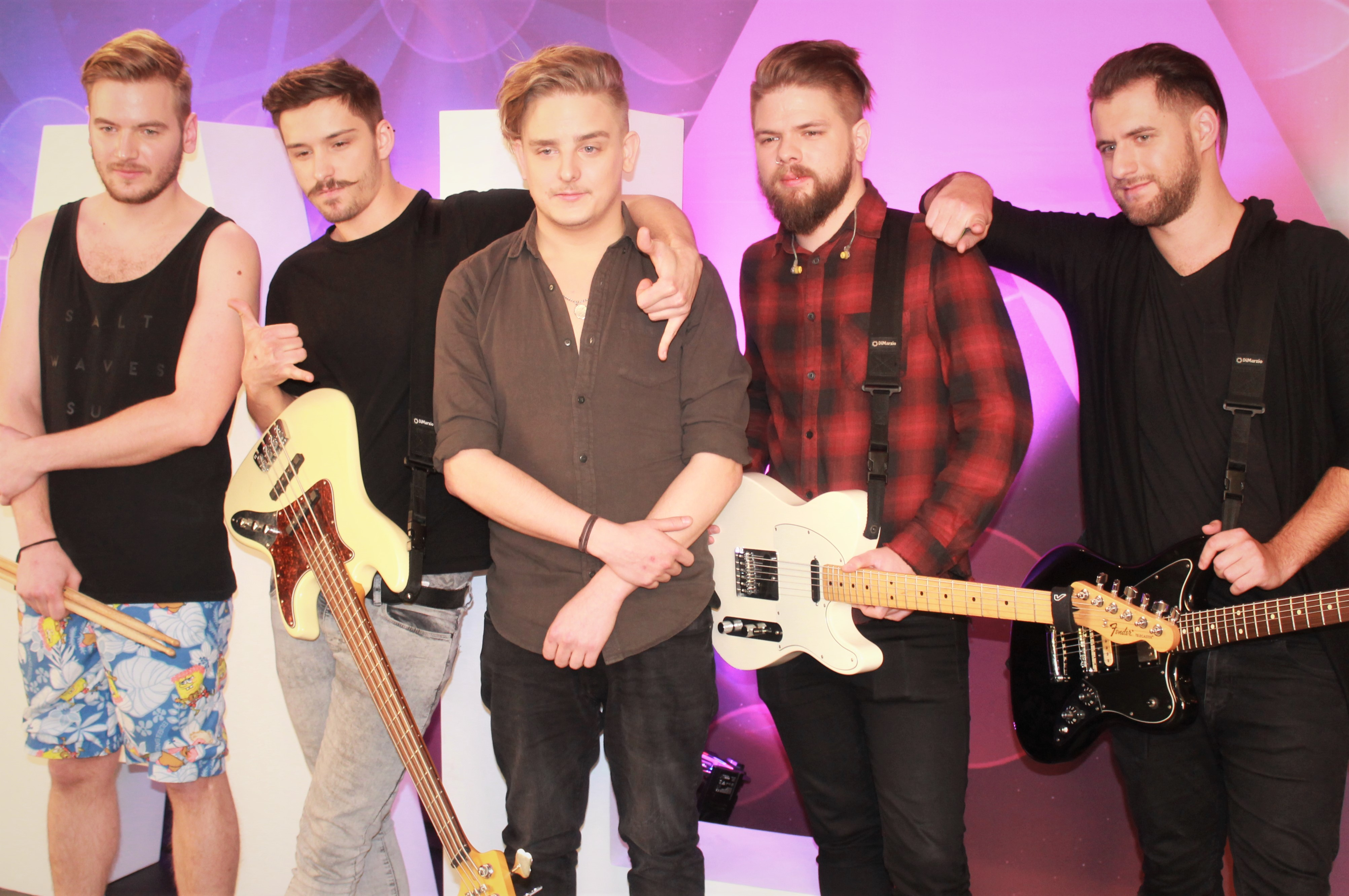
AWS in 2018. Left to right: Veress, Schiszler, Siklósi, Kökényes and Brucker.

The band played Sziget Festival in 2010 and have toured across Europe, in Austria, England, the Netherlands, Romania, Slovenia, and Spain. They won the MTV Brand award for New Winning Band. They have toured with Blind Myself.

At the beginning of 2017, Soma Schiszler joined the team. On 6 December 2017, it was announced that AWS would compete in A Dal 2018, the Hungarian national selection process for the Eurovision Song Contest 2018. Their song "Viszlát Nyár" (Goodbye Summer) won the competition and as a result, represented Hungary in the Eurovision Song Contest 2018. They qualified from the 2nd semifinal, and ended in 21st place in the final with 93 points.

During their stint at Eurovision Song Contest it was announced that AWS were invited to play at Wacken Open Air in August 2018. In October the same year AWS released their fourth full-length studio record called Fekete Részem which charted at no. 2 at Hungarian Albums Charts a week later.

Lead singer Örs Siklósi died on 5 February 2021 from leukaemia at the age of 29. The band announced his death on Instagram the following day.

On 16 January 2023, the band introduced the new vocalist, Tamás Stefán.

== Musical style ==
According to an interview with the German-language Hungarian newspaper Budapester Zeitung the musicians came in contact with rock and metal music during their childhoods. Bands like Nirvana, Metallica and several Hungarian metal bands were the first ones they listened to. The musicians named Linkin Park, Pantera, System of a Down, and Korn, as well as Hungarian acts Superbutt, Subscribe and Isten Háta Mögött as their personal musical influences.

The band's lyrics on their debut record Fata Morgana were mostly written in English but they decided to write song lyrics in Hungarian for future songs. For Fata Morgana, the band wrote the lyrics in Hungarian first and later translated them into English. The lyrical themes deal with personal experiences as well as societal and economic themes.

Their sound has been described as having catchy melodies, a clear Hungarian character, vocal harmonies and a decent groove. Some songs were described to be mass appealing, modern metal.

== Discography ==
AWS's logo

=== Studio albums ===
Year	Title (Details)	Peak positions	Sales	Certifications
Year	Title (Details)	HUN (Note: The Hungarian Albums Chart doesn't have a personal artist archive, only overall chart rankings archive instead. If you want look up on how long a song or an album lasted in the Charts you have to check it manually.)	Sales	Certifications
2011	Fata Morgana * Label: EDGE Records * Released: 25 April 2011 * Format: CD, DL	27 (Note: The album charted in the week of 18 October 2018.) (1 w)		
2014	Égésföld * Label: EDGE Records * Released: 7 April 2014 * Format: CD, DL	6 (Note: The album reached its peak position on 13 April 2014 and re-entered the charts at no 21 on 18 October 2018.) (2 w)		
2016	Kint a vízből * Label: EDGE Records * Released: 5 September 2016 * Format: CD, DL	7 (Note: The album reached its peak position on 9 September 2016 and re-entered the charts at no 20 on 18 October 2018.) (2 w)		
2018	Fekete részem * Label: EDGE Records * Released: 1 October 2018 * Format: CD, DL	2 (3 w)	HUN: 12,000	MAHASZ: 3× Platinum (phy)
2024	Innen szép nyerni * Label: Zeneműkiadó Kft. * Released: 10 May 2024 * Format: CD, DL	3 (4 w)		

=== Live albums ===
Year	Title (Details)	Peak positions
Year	Title (Details)	HUN (Note: The Hungarian Albums Chart doesn't have a personal artist archive, only a overall chart rankings archive instead. If you want look up on how long a song or an album lasted in the Charts you have to check it manually.)
2018	Madách * Label: EDGE Records * Released: 24 December 2018 * Format: CD, DVD, DL	9

=== Extended plays ===
Title	Details
Világposztolás	Released: 2012; Label: EDGE Records; Format: Digital download, CD

=== Singles ===
Title	Year	Peak chart positions	Album
Title	Year	HUN	Album
Takard el	2011	—	Fata Morgana
Válaszút	2012	—	Égésföld
Világposztolás	2012	—	Égésföld
Ha nem tűnsz el	2013	—	Égésföld
Nem fáj	2014	—	Égésföld
Te is félsz	2015	—	Kint a vízből
Hajnali járat	2016	—	Kint a vízből
Viszlát nyár	2017	1	Fekete Részem
Hol voltál?	2018	30	Fekete Részem
X/0	2018	—	Fekete Részem
Fekete Részem	2018	—	Fekete Részem
Még Lélegzem	2019	—	Non-album singles
Engedd el (feat. Cloud 9+)	2019	—	Non-album singles
Emlékszem (Hivatalos videó)	2021	—	Non-album singles
Útvesztő	2022	—	Non-album singles
Odaát	2023	—	Innen szép nyerni
2359	2023	—	Innen szép nyerni
Ketten képzeletben	2023	—	Innen szép nyerni
Fények nélkül	2024	—	Innen szép nyerni
Nincs Árnyék	2024	—	Innen szép nyerni
Senki nincs már ébren	2024	—	Innen szép nyerni
Pillanatom	2026	–	Non-album single

== Notes ==
Awards and achievements
Preceded by Joci Pápai with "Origo"	Hungary in the Eurovision Song Contest; 2018	Succeeded by Joci Pápai with "Az én apám"
