= Nox (band) =

Hungarian band

- Origin: Hungary
- Genres: Pop; Folk
- Instrument: Vocals
- Years active: 2002–2009, 2021–
- Label: Universal Music (2003–2009)
- Past members: Zoltán Szűcs (2003); Szilvia Péter Szabó (2003–2009); Tamás Nagy (2003–2009)
- Website: Nox Official Site

Nox were a Hungarian pop band which mixed traditional Hungarian music with more modern sounds. They released 7 albums and had two fixed members, Szilvia Péter Szabó, and Tamás Nagy.

== Eurovision performance ==
They are best known in the rest of Europe for representing Hungary in the Eurovision Song Contest 2005 in Kyiv. After qualifying from the semi-final in fifth place, they eventually finished 12th with their song Forogj, világ! (Spin, World). They were the first Hungarian act in the contest since 1998.

== Discography ==
=== Albums ===
Album information
Örökség (Heritage)
- Released: 22 July 2002
- Chart Positions: #1 HUN
- HUN certification: Platinum
- HUN Sales: 28,000
Bűvölet (Enchantment)
- Released: 27 October 2003
- Chart Positions: #1 HUN
- HUN certification: 2× Platinum
- HUN Sales: 53,000
Karácsony (Christmas)
- Released: 15 November 2004
- Chart Positions: #1 HUN
- HUN certification: Platinum
- HUN Sales: 29,000
Ragyogás (Shining)
- Released: 16 April 2005
- Chart Positions: #1 HUN
- HUN certification: 2× Platinum
- HUN Sales: 42,000
Örömvölgy (Joy Valley)
- Released: 16 October 2006
- Chart Positions: #1 HUN
- HUN certification: 2× Platinum
- HUN Sales: 30,000+
Csendes (Silent)
- Released: 26 November 2007
- Chart Positions: #1 HUN
- HUN certification: Gold
- HUN Sales: 7,500+
Időntúl (Beyond Time)
- Released: 5 September 2008
- Chart Positions: #2 HUN
- HUN certification: Gold
- HUN Sales: 7,500+
Most (Now)
- Released: 16 November 2009
- Chart Positions: #4 HUN
- HUN certification:
- HUN Sales:
Best of
- Released: 19 March 2010
- Chart Positions: #7 HUN
- HUN certification:
- HUN Sales:

== See also ==
- Hungarian pop

Awards and achievements
Preceded by Charlie with "A holnap már nem lesz szomorú"	Hungary in the Eurovision Song Contest; 2005	Succeeded by Magdi Rúzsa with "Unsubstantial Blues"
