= Szilvia Péter Szabó =

Hungarian singer

Péter Szabó Szilvia
- Born: 9 September 1982 (age 43); Szeged, Hungarian People's Republic
- Genres: Pop, folk
- Occupation: Singer
- Years active: 2002–present
- Label: Universal Music
- Website: Szilvia Official Site

Szilvia Péter Szabó (born 9 September 1982 in Szeged, Hungary) is a Hungarian pop singer. She is most well known as the singer of the Hungarian folk-pop band NOX.

== Career ==
She learned to sing on her own. Early in her career, she was a singer of a small band in Szeged. Later, she was discovered and was chosen to become the singer of the newly created music group NOX. She has been a member of the group ever since unlike nearly all other members.

NOX has been very successful. They took part in the Eurovision Song Contest, they won the Dalnokok Ligája and they also won several awards. NOX is one of the most well-known groups in Hungary and they plan to tour Western Europe.

In 2012, Péter Szabó signed a new management deal with the UK music artist management firm Crossfire Management, managed by Roy Perestrelo and Pierre Lewis and in the same year signed a new deal with Universal Music Group and Universal Hungary to see her create her 11th Studio album entitled "REVOLUTION" which has works produced by herself, Joe Lawrence, Pierre Lewis (http://www.pierreofficial.com), MAC-1 (http://www.mac1official.com) (Labyrinths elder brother), Perri Hawn, Nu:GEN (http://www.nugenmusic.co.uk) Sam Barter and Paul Britt (http://www.paulbritt.com).

== Personal life ==
Péter Szabó travels extensively and spends her time between her home in the UK and Hungary. Her touring extends over Eastern Europe and beyond.

== Discography ==
=== Albums ===
All information given are for Hungary only.

Album information
Örökség (Heritage)
- Released: 2002
- Chart position: No. 1
- Certification: Platinum
- Sales: 28.000
Bűvölet (Enchantment)
- Released: 2003
- Chart position: No. 1
- Certification: 2× Platinum
- Sales: 53.000
Karácsony (Christmas)
- Released: November 2004
- Chart positions: No. 1
- Certification: Platinum
- Sales: 29.000
Ragyogás (Shining)
- Released: 16 April 2005
- Chart positions: No. 1
- Certification: 2× Platinum
- Sales: 42.000
Örömvölgy (Joy Valley)
- Released: 16 October 2006
- Chart positions: No. 1
- Certification: 2× Platinum
- Sales: 30.000+
Mesék, mondák, mondókák (Tales, Legends, Nursery Rhymes)
- Released: 7 May 2007
- Chart position: ?
- Certification: ?
- Sales: ?
Csendes (Silent)
- Released: 26 November 2007
- Chart position: No. 1
- Certification: Gold
- Sales: 7.500+
Időntúl (Over Time)
- Released: 5 September 2008
- Chart position: No. 2
- Certification: ?
- Sales: ?
Revolution
- Electronic Release: 24 May 2013
- Physical Release 28 May 2013
- Chart positions: No. 3
- Certification: TBA
- Sales: TBA

== See also ==
- Hungarian pop
