= Gjon Delhusa =

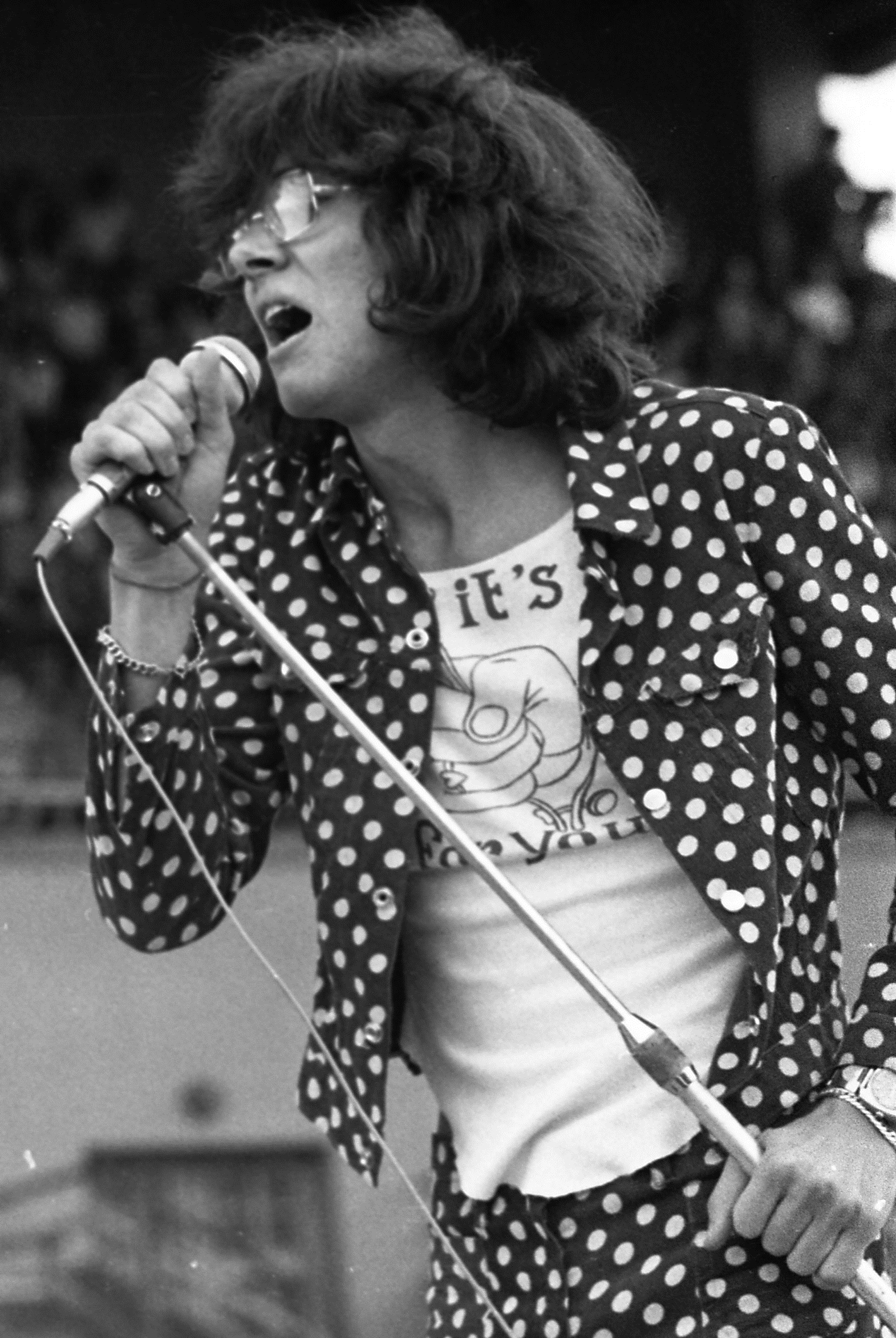
- Gjon Delhusa in 1973

Background information
- Born: 9 August 1953 (age 71); Budapest, Hungary
- Genres: Pop
- Occupation(s): Singer, Songwriter, Guitarist
- Instrument: vocals
- Years active: 1971–present
- Labels: Hungaroton

Gjon Delhusa (Hungarian pronunciation: [ˈd͡ʒon ˈdɛlhusɒ]; born 9 August 1953) is a Hungarian singer, composer and lyricist, and the cousin of singer Gábor Ihász and footballer Kálmán Ihász. He was the 1996 representative for Hungary in the Eurovision Song Contest 1996.

== Early life ==
Delhusa was born on 9 August 1953, in Budapest. His mother, Erzsébet Ihász, was Gábor and Kálmán Ihász's aunt. His paternal grandparents were Greek and Albanian and his maternal side was mixed German-Hungarian.

== Eurovision ==
In 1996, he was chosen via national final to represent Hungary in the Eurovision Song Contest 1996 in Oslo with the song Fortuna, but was eliminated in the audio-only qualify round. The system was unique, but also had its controversies, as along with Hungary, Germany, one of the main financial contributors to the contest, had also been eliminated. This caused the system to be disposed of after that year.

Awards and achievements
Preceded by Csaba Szigeti with "Új név a régi ház falán"	Hungary in the Eurovision Song Contest; 1996	Succeeded by V.I.P with "Miért kell, hogy elmenj?"
