= Hungary in the Eurovision Song Contest =

- Eurovision Song Contest
- Former participating broadcaster: Magyar Televízió (MTV; 1993–2009); Médiaszolgáltatás-támogató és Vagyonkezelő Alap (MTVA; 2011–2019)

Participation summary
- Appearances: 17 (14 finals)
- First appearance: 1994
- Last appearance: 2019
- Highest placement: 4th: 1994
- Participation history: ~~1993~~; 1994; 1995; ~~1996~~; 1997; 1998; 1999; 2000; 2001; 2002; 2003; 2004; 2005; 2006; 2007; 2008; 2009; 2010; 2011; 2012; 2013; 2014; 2015; 2016; 2017; 2018; 2019; 2020 – 2026

Related articles
- A Dal
- Hungary's page at Eurovision.com
- For the most recent participation see Hungary in the Eurovision Song Contest 2019

Hungary has been represented at the Eurovision Song Contest 17 times since making its debut in 1994. Hungary attempted to participate in 1993 but failed to qualify from Kvalifikacija za Millstreet, a special qualifying competition set up for seven former Eastern Bloc countries. The most recent Hungarian participating broadcaster in the contest was Médiaszolgáltatás-támogató és Vagyonkezelő Alap (MTVA).

Hungary's first contest in 1994 remains its most successful, with "Kinek mondjam el vétkeimet?" performed by Friderika Bayer finishing in fourth place. The country's only other top five result is a fifth-place finish with "Running" by András Kállay-Saunders in 2014. Other top ten results are "Unsubstantial Blues" by Magdi Rúzsa finishing ninth in 2007, "Kedvesem" by ByeAlex tenth in 2013, and "Origo" by Joci Pápai eighth in 2017, giving Hungary a total of five top ten placements.

== Participation ==
Magyar Televízió (MTV) was a full member of the European Broadcasting Union (EBU) since 1 January 1993, thus eligible to participate in the Eurovision Song Contest since then. It participated in the contest representing Hungary since its 39th edition in 1994. From 2011 to 2019, after a restructuring that led to the incorporation of MTV into Médiaszolgáltatás-támogató és Vagyonkezelő Alap (MTVA), it was the latter who participated representing Hungary. Before becoming a member of the EBU, earlier contests had often been broadcast on MTV.

== History ==
=== 1990s ===
Hungary's first entry in the Eurovision Song Contest would have been "Árva reggel", performed by Andrea Szulák, in 1993, but a qualification round was held for former Eastern Bloc countries, and the song did not manage to qualify to the final. The first official Hungarian participation was with "Kinek mondjam el vétkeimet?", performed by Friderika Bayer, in 1994. This proved successful, as Hungary received the maximum score of 12 points from the first three countries to vote. However, as the competition progressed, it attracted fewer votes and ultimately finished in fourth place. This still holds as their best result ever.

The 1995 entry was not as successful, garnering only 3 points, narrowly beating last-place Germany. In 1996 Hungary again failed to qualify when "Fortuna", performed by Gjon Delhusa did not qualify from the pre-qualification round. Then, Hungary participated in 1997 and 1998 contests.

Following a poor placement in the 1998 contest, Hungary was relegated from participating in 1999. However, after Latvia, who was originally set to debut, withdrew its participation at a late stage, its place in the contest was subsequently offered to Hungary as the excluded country with the highest average points total. However, Hungary decided against participation, and continued to be absent from the contest for the next six years.

=== 2000s ===
Having been absent since 1999, Hungary had planned to return in 2004, but ultimately did not take part in the contest. They eventually returned in 2005, where they finished in 12th place in the final with "Forogj, világ!", performed by NOX. However, Hungary withdrew again in 2006, returning in 2007 with "Unsubstantial Blues", the first Hungarian entry in English, performed by Magdi Rúzsa, the winner of the 3rd season of the Hungarian talent show Megasztár. The song came 9th in Helsinki, receiving 128 points in the final.

After coming last in the semi-final in the 2008 contest, MTV confirmed Hungary's participation at the 2009 contest in Moscow. After its original choice was revealed to have been released before 1 October 2008, breaking contest rules, it was decided that "Dance with Me", performed by Zoltán Ádok, would be Hungary's entry, after MTV's second choice to represent Hungary declined. The song placed 15th in the second semi-final, failing to qualify for the grand final for the second time since the introduction of the semi-finals in 2004.

=== 2010s ===
In October 2009, MTV confirmed that it would not participate in the 2010 contest due to financial limitations in the company which would prevent it from sending an entry. Duna Televízió broadcast the event live and applied for EBU membership to send a representative to Düsseldorf in 2011. However, during the EBU's 65th conference, Duna's bid to become an active member was rejected.

In December 2010, it was confirmed that MTVA had agreed to return to the 2011 edition. MTVA internally selected the song "What About My Dreams?", performed by Kati Wolf. The song placed 7th in the first semi-final with 72 points and was the first entry representing Hungary to qualify for the final since 2007. In the final, the song placed 22nd with 53 points.

In 2012, MTVA organised a national final, A Dal, to select the Hungarian entry for the contest in Baku. The song "Sound of Our Hearts", performed by Compact Disco, was selected. The song placed 10th in the first semi-final with 52 points, and 24th in the final with 19 points. A Dal had been used as the Hungarian selection process annually until 2019.

In 2013, Hungary reached the top 10, when the song "Kedvesem (Zoohacker Remix)", performed by ByeAlex, placed 10th with 84 points. Hungary reached the top five in 2014, when the song "Running", performed by András Kállay-Saunders, placed fifth with 143 points, achieving the best result for Hungary in the contest since its 1994 debut.

Hungary made it to the top ten once again in 2017, when the song "Origo", performed by Joci Pápai, placed 8th with 200 points, achieving their best result in three years. Pápai represented Hungary again in 2019 with the song "Az én apám", but failed to qualify for the final, marking Hungary's first non-qualification since 2009.

=== 2020s: Absence ===
Hungary did not appear on the final list of participants for the 2020 contest, which was subsequently cancelled due to the COVID-19 pandemic; it has been absent from the contest since. MTVA stated that it would continue to organise A Dal to "support the valuable productions created by the talents of Hungarian pop music directly" instead of participating in the contest. The withdrawal came during a rise of anti-LGBTQ+ sentiment among the leadership of Hungary and MTVA; while no official reason for the withdrawal was given by the broadcaster, an inside source speaking with the website Index.hu speculated that the contest was considered "too gay" for MTVA to participate.

At a forum in Győr in August 2025, when asked about Hungary's absence from the contest, the chairman of the Tisza Party, Péter Magyar, stated that if his party is able to form a government after the 2026 Hungarian parliamentary election, he would consider initiating the country's return to the event. In May 2026, Magyar, who had been elected prime minister after his party won the election, revealed during an interview on Austrian broadcaster ORF's news program Zeit im Bild that he had instructed the Minister or State Secretary for Culture to examine the possibility of a return. On 23 June, the Hungarian parliament passed an amendment to the National Media Act, which dissolved MTVA and established a new broadcaster, Hungarian Radio and Television (MRTV). The amendment was enacted on 27 June.

== Participation overview ==
Table key
2	Second place
3	Third place
◁	Last place
◇	Entry selected but did not compete

Year	Artist	Song	Language	Final	Points	Semi	Points
1993	Andrea Szulák ◇	"Árva reggel" ◇	Hungarian ◇	Failed to qualify (Note: A qualifying round was held for new countries looking to make their debut at the 1993 contest. Hungary failed to progress from this round; entries which failed to progress have subsequently been discounted by the EBU and do not feature as part of the countries' list of appearances.)		6	44
1994	Friderika	"Kinek mondjam el vétkeimet?"	Hungarian	4	122	No semi-finals	
1995	Csaba Szigeti	"Új név egy régi ház falán"	Hungarian	22	3	No semi-finals	
1996	Gjon Delhusa ◇	"Fortuna" ◇	Hungarian ◇	Failed to qualify (Note: In order to reduce the number of participating countries at the 1996 event a qualifying round was held among all countries except the hosts. Hungary failed to progress from this round; entries which failed to progress have subsequently been discounted by the EBU and do not feature as part of the countries' list of appearances.)		23	26
1997	V.I.P.	"Miért kell, hogy elmenj?"	Hungarian	12	39	No semi-finals	
1998	Charlie	"A holnap már nem lesz szomorú"	Hungarian	23	4	No semi-finals	
2005	Nox	"Forogj, világ!"	Hungarian	12	97	5	167
2007	Magdi Rúzsa	"Unsubstantial Blues"	English	9	128	2	224
2008	Csézy	"Candlelight"	English, Hungarian	Failed to qualify		19 ◁	6
2009	Zoli Ádok	"Dance with Me"	English	Failed to qualify		15	16
2011	Kati Wolf	"What About My Dreams?"	English, Hungarian	22	53	7	72
2012	Compact Disco	"Sound of Our Hearts"	English	24	19	10	52
2013	ByeAlex	"Kedvesem" (Zoohacker Remix)	Hungarian	10	84	8	66
2014	András Kállay-Saunders	"Running"	English	5	143	3	127
2015	Boggie	"Wars for Nothing"	English	20	19	8	67
2016	Freddie	"Pioneer"	English	19	108	4	197
2017	Joci Pápai	"Origo"	Hungarian	8	200	2	231
2018	AWS	"Viszlát nyár"	Hungarian	21	93	10	111
2019	Joci Pápai	"Az én apám"	Hungarian	Failed to qualify		12	97

== Awards ==
=== Marcel Bezençon Awards ===
Year	Category	Song	Composer(s) lyrics (l) / music (m)	Performer	Final	Points	Host city	Ref.
2007	Composer Award	"Unsubstantial Blues"	Magdi Rúzsa (m) and Imre Mózsik (l)	Magdi Rúzsa	9	128	(Finland) Helsinki	

=== Winner by OGAE members ===
Year	Song	Performer	Place	Points	Host city	Ref.
2011	"What About My Dreams?"	Kati Wolf	22	53	(Germany) Düsseldorf	

=== Barbara Dex Award ===
Year	Performer	Host city	Ref.
2009	Zoli Ádok	(Russia) Moscow	

== Related involvement ==
=== Conductors ===
Their first entry was conducted by Péter Wolf

=== Heads of delegation ===
Each participating broadcaster in the Eurovision Song Contest assigns a head of delegation as the EBU's contact person and the leader of their delegation at the event. The delegation, whose size can greatly vary, includes a head of press, the performers, songwriters, composers, and backing vocalists, among others.

Year	Head of delegation	Ref.
2008–2016	Szilvia Püspök	
2017–2019	Lőrinc Bubnó	

=== Commentators and spokespersons ===
Year	Channel	Commentator(s)	Spokesperson	Ref.
1965	MTV	Unknown	Did not participate	
1966	MTV	Unknown	Did not participate	
1967	MTV	Unknown	Did not participate	
1968	MTV	Unknown	Did not participate	
1969	MTV	Unknown	Did not participate	
1970	MTV	Unknown	Did not participate	
1971	MTV	Unknown	Did not participate	
1972	MTV	Unknown	Did not participate	
1973	MTV	Unknown	Did not participate	
1974	MTV1	Unknown	Did not participate	
1975	MTV1	Unknown	Did not participate	
1976	Petőfi Rádió	Unknown	Did not participate	
1977	MTV2	Unknown	Did not participate	
1978	MTV2	Unknown	Did not participate	
1979–1980	No broadcast		Did not participate	
1981	MTV2	András Sugár	Did not participate	
1982	MTV1	Unknown	Did not participate	
1983–1985	No broadcast		Did not participate	
1986	MTV1	Unknown	Did not participate	
1987	MTV2	István Vágó	Did not participate	
1988	MTV2	István Vágó	Did not participate	
1989	MTV2	István Vágó	Did not participate	
1990	MTV2	István Vágó	Did not participate	
1991	MTV1	István Vágó	Did not participate	
1992	MTV1	István Vágó	Did not participate	
1993	MTV1	István Vágó	Did not participate	
1994	MTV2	István Vágó	Iván Bradányi	
1995	MTV2	István Vágó	Katalin Bogyay	
1996	MTV2	István Vágó	Did not participate	
1997	MTV1	István Vágó	Györgyi Albert	
1998	MTV1	Gábor Gundel Takács	Barna Héder	
1999–2004	No broadcast		Did not participate	
2005	m1	Zsuzsa Demcsák, András Fáber and Dávid Szántó	Zsuzsa Demcsák	
2006	No broadcast		Did not participate	
2007	m1	Gábor Gundel Takács	Éva Novodomszky	
2008	m1 (SF2, Final)	Gábor Gundel Takács	Éva Novodomszky	
2009	m1	Gábor Gundel Takács	Éva Novodomszky	
2010	Duna TV	Zsolt Jeszenszky	Did not participate	
2011	m1	Gábor Gundel Takács	Éva Novodomszky	
2012	m1	Gábor Gundel Takács	Éva Novodomszky	
2013	m1	Gábor Gundel Takács	Éva Novodomszky	
2014	m1	Gábor Gundel Takács	Éva Novodomszky	
2015	Duna	Gábor Gundel Takács	Csilla Tatár	
2016	Duna	Gábor Gundel Takács	Csilla Tatár	
2017	Duna	Krisztina Rátonyi and Freddie	Csilla Tatár	
2018	Duna	Krisztina Rátonyi and Freddie	Bence Forró	
2019	Duna	Krisztina Rátonyi and Freddie	Bence Forró	
2020–2026	No broadcast		Did not participate	

== Photo gallery ==
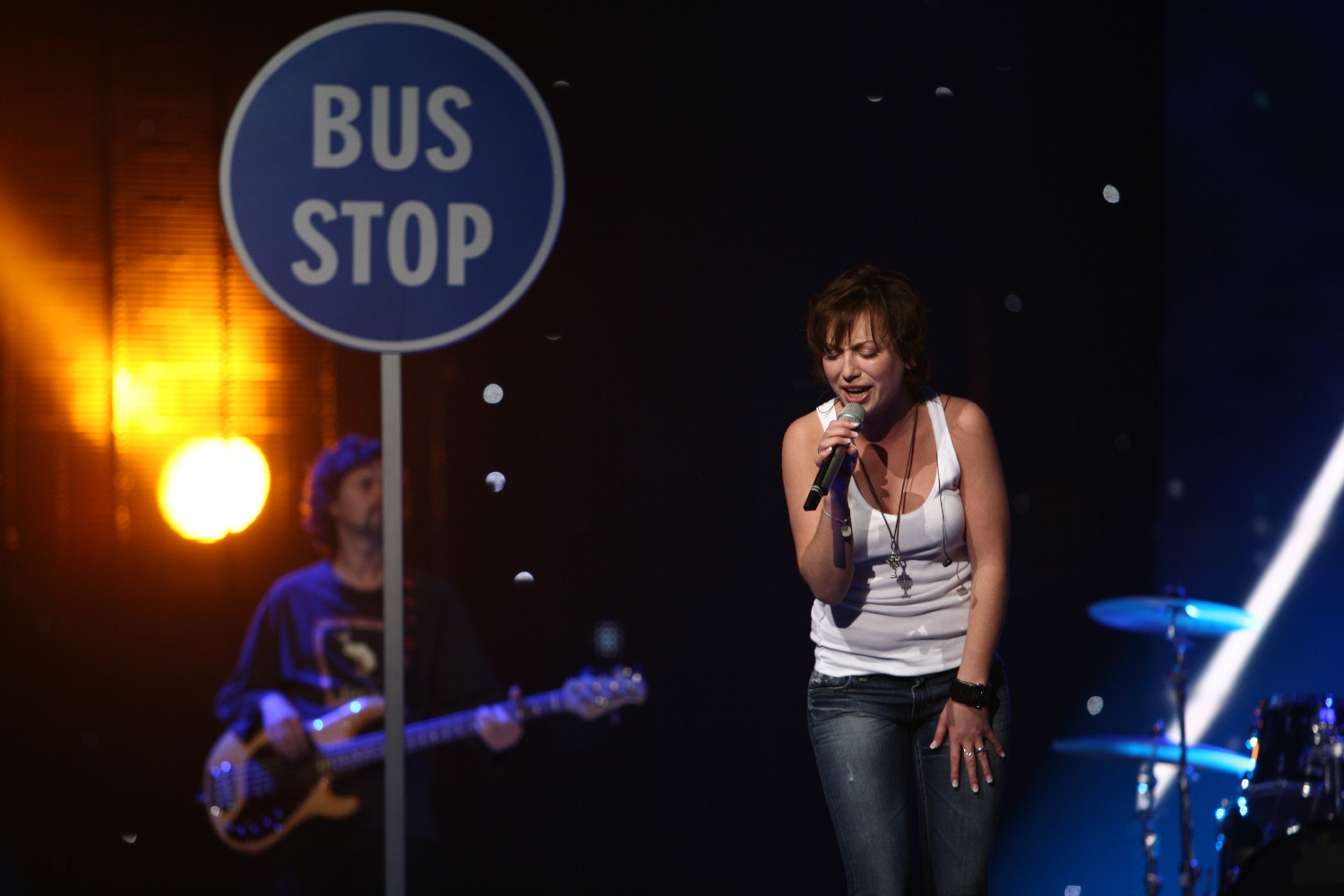
Magdi Rúzsa in Helsinki (2007)

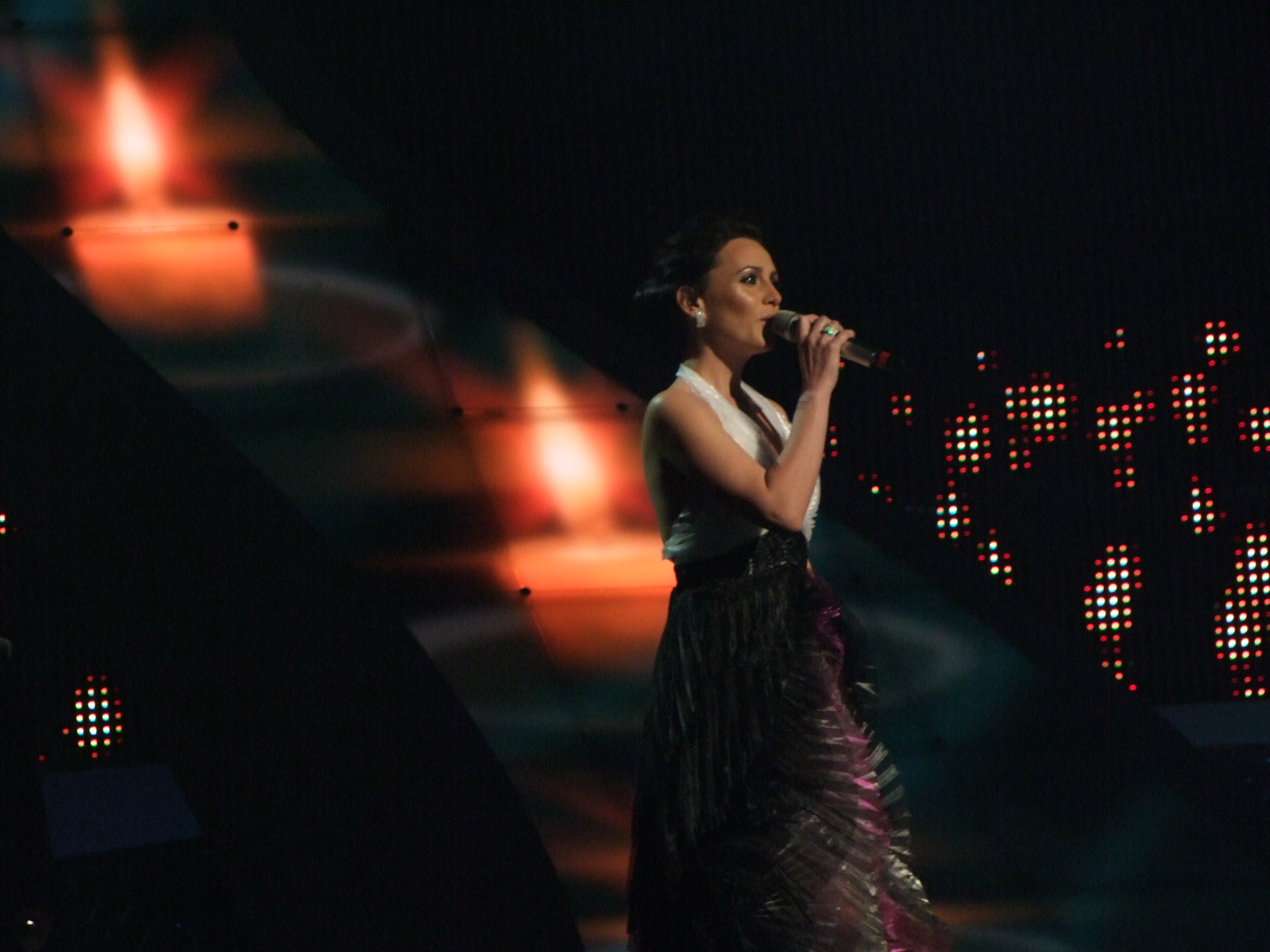
Csézy in Belgrade (2008)

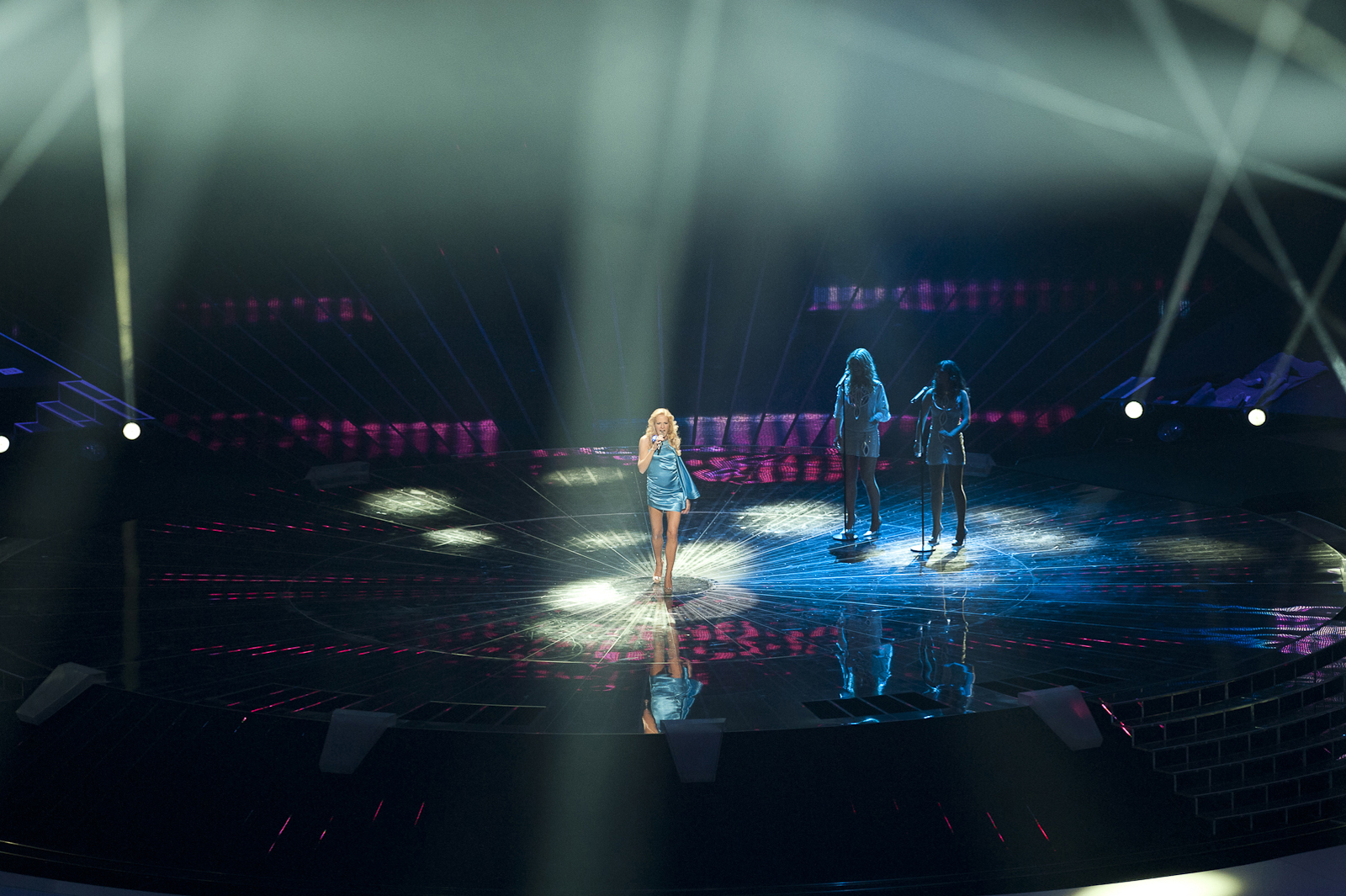
Kati Wolf in Düsseldorf (2011)

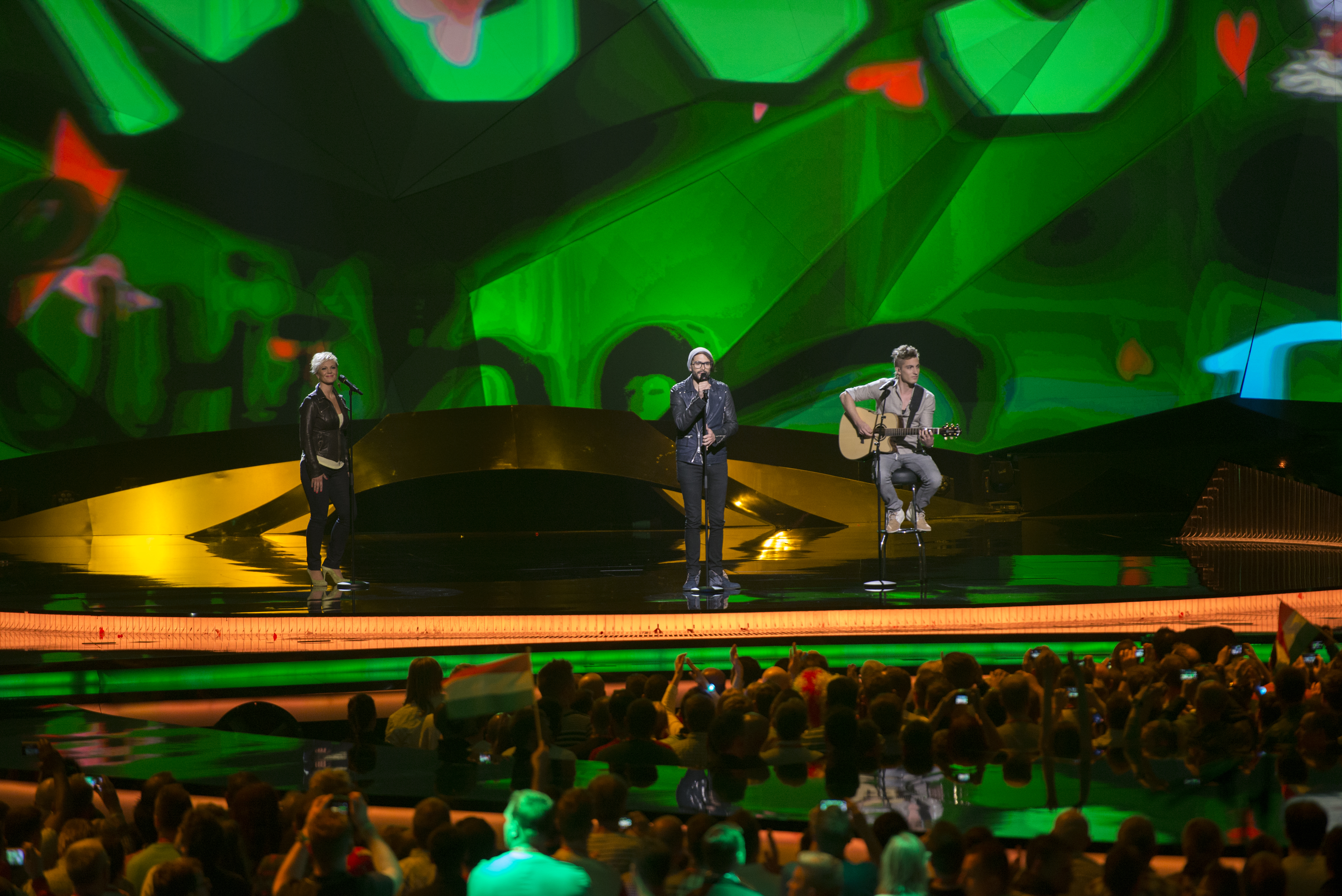
ByeAlex in Malmö (2013)

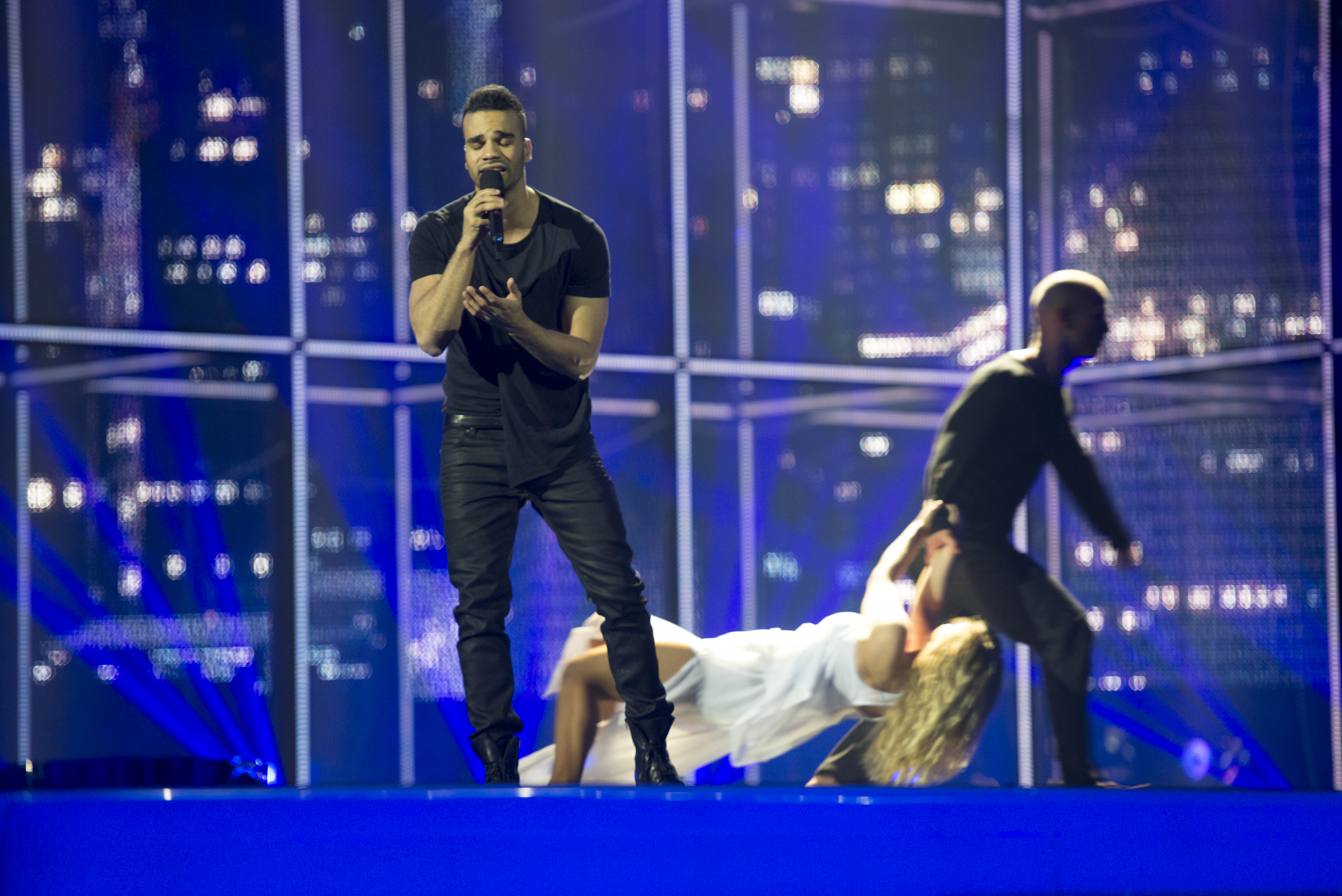
András Kállay-Saunders in Copenhagen (2014)

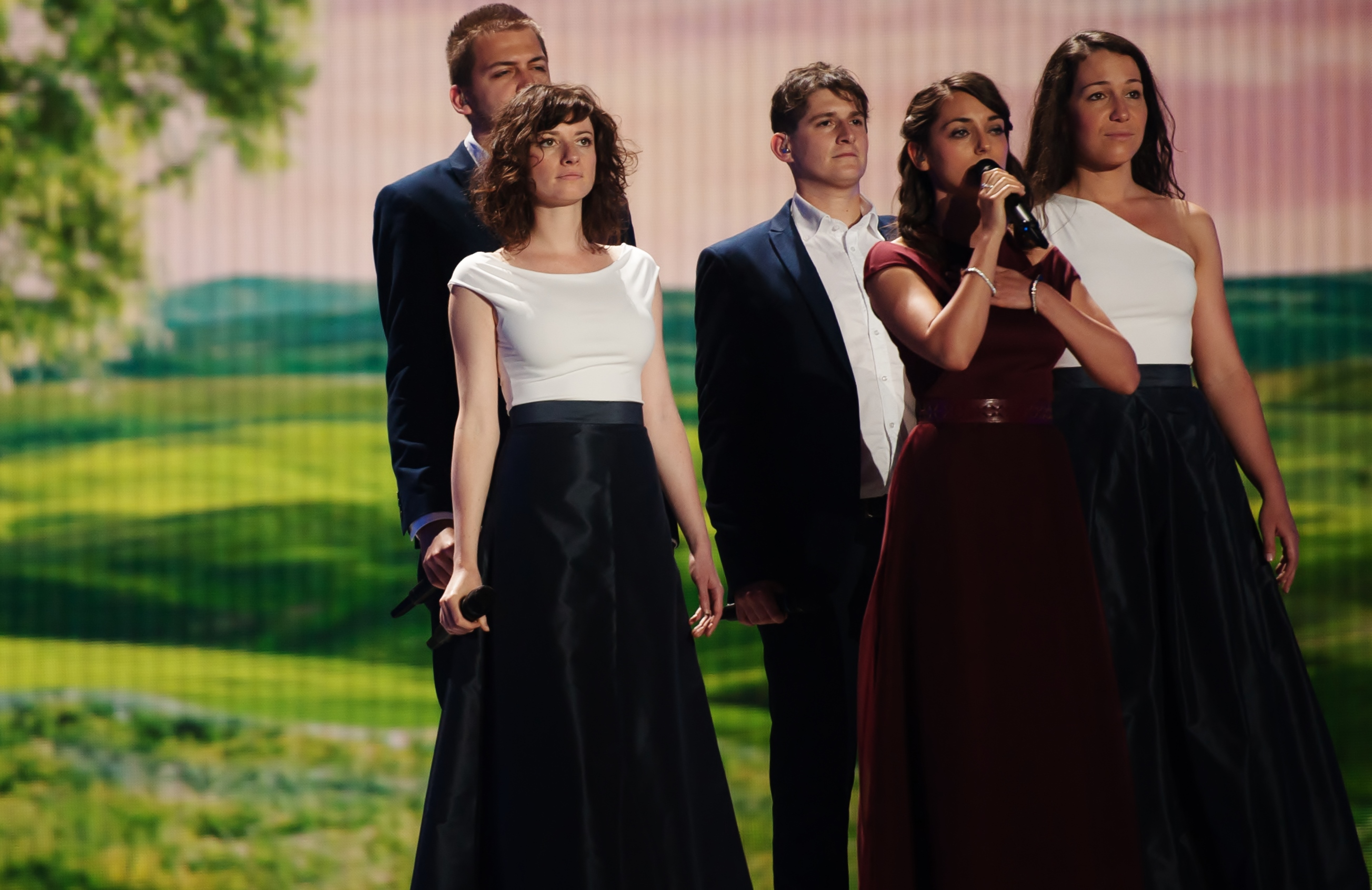
Boggie in Vienna (2015)

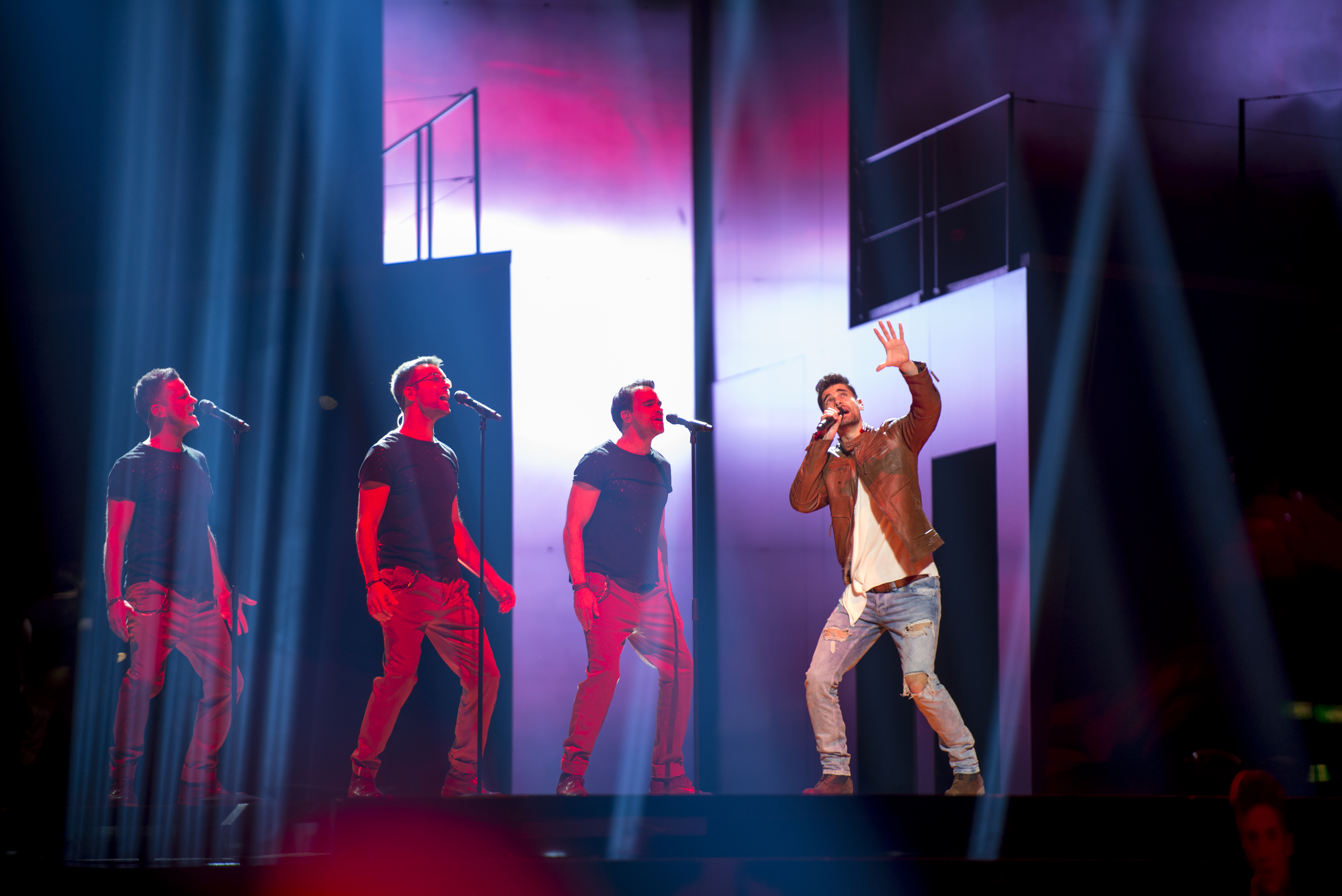
Freddie in Stockholm (2016)

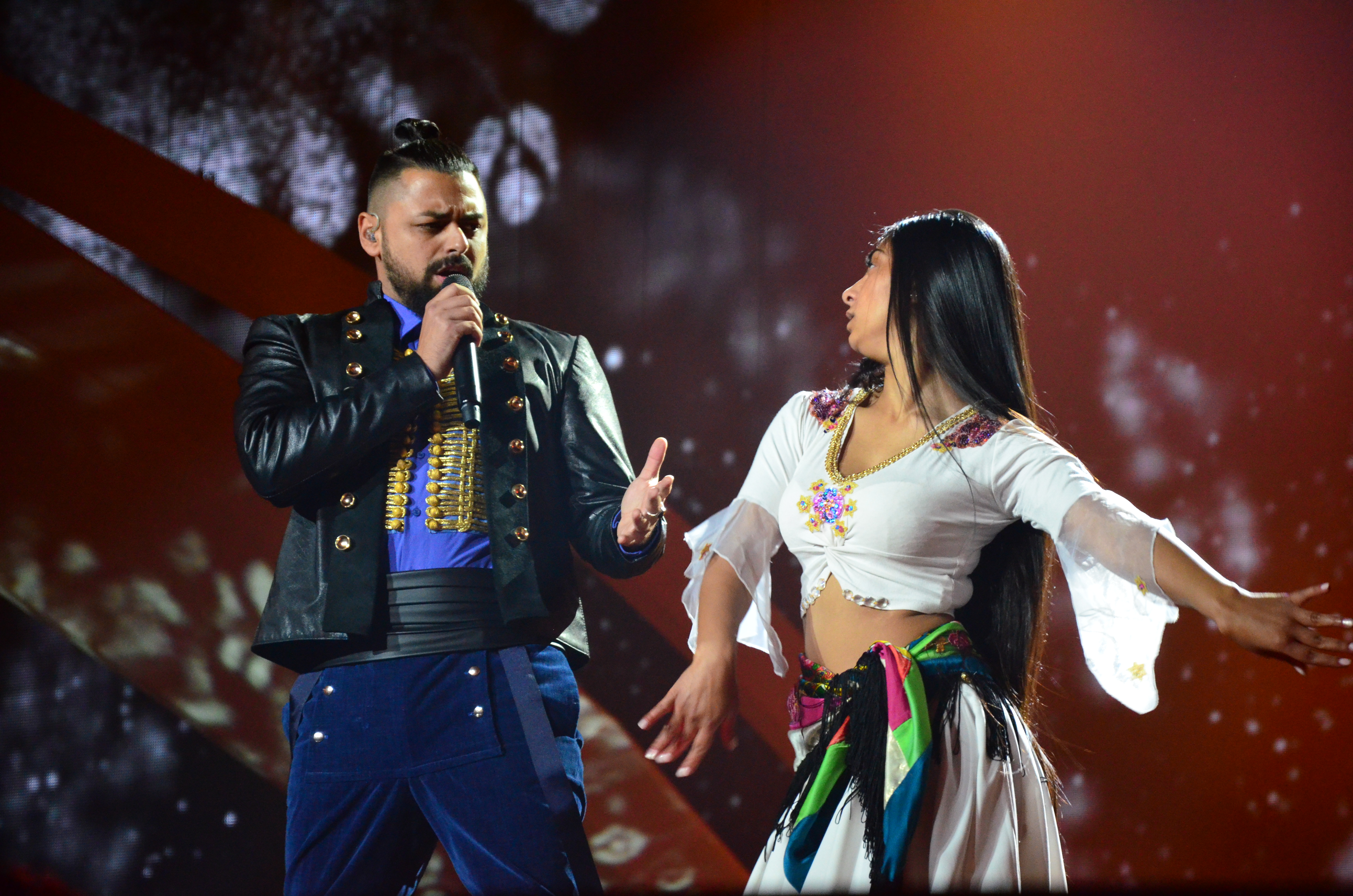
Joci Pápai in Kyiv (2017)

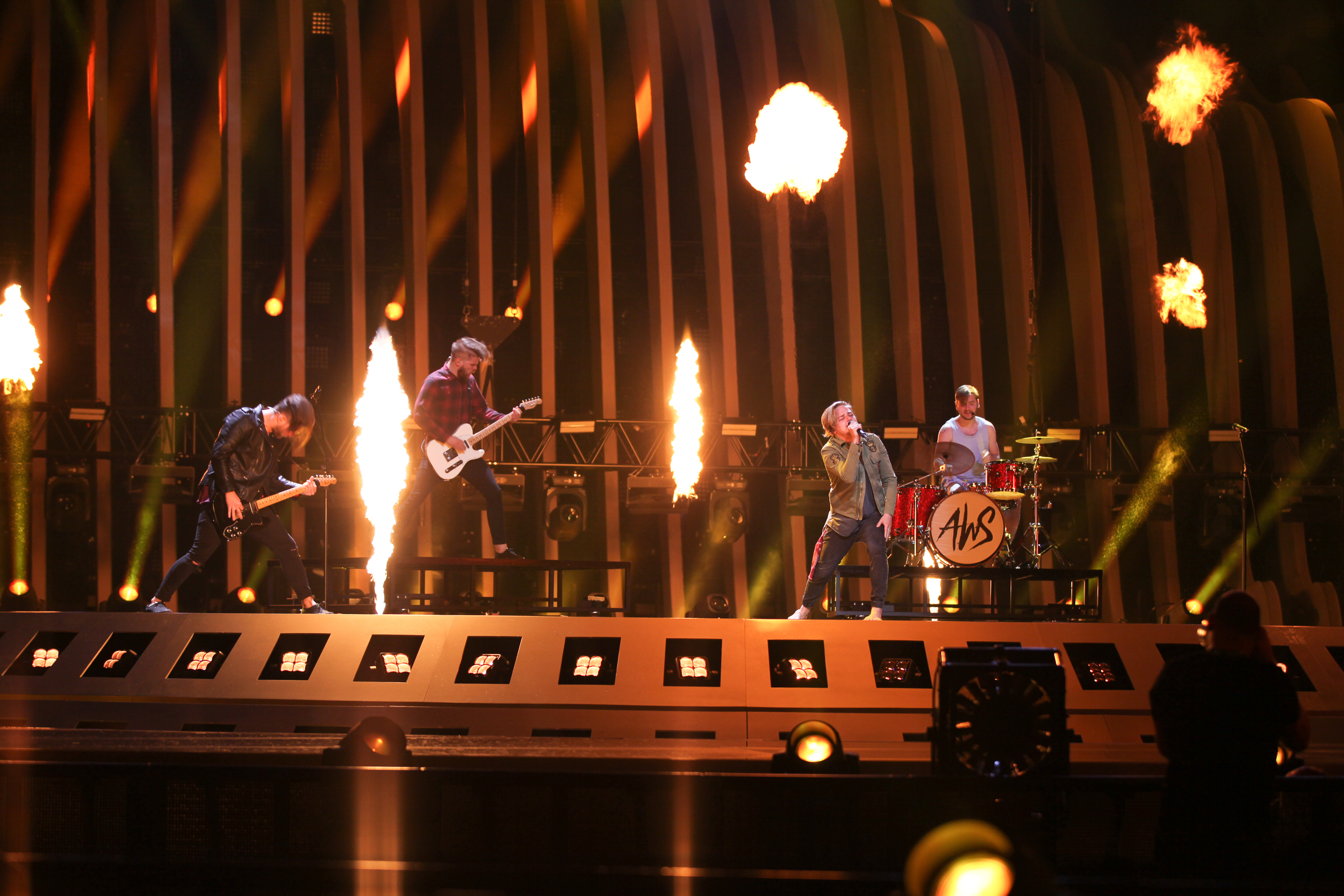
AWS in Lisbon (2018)

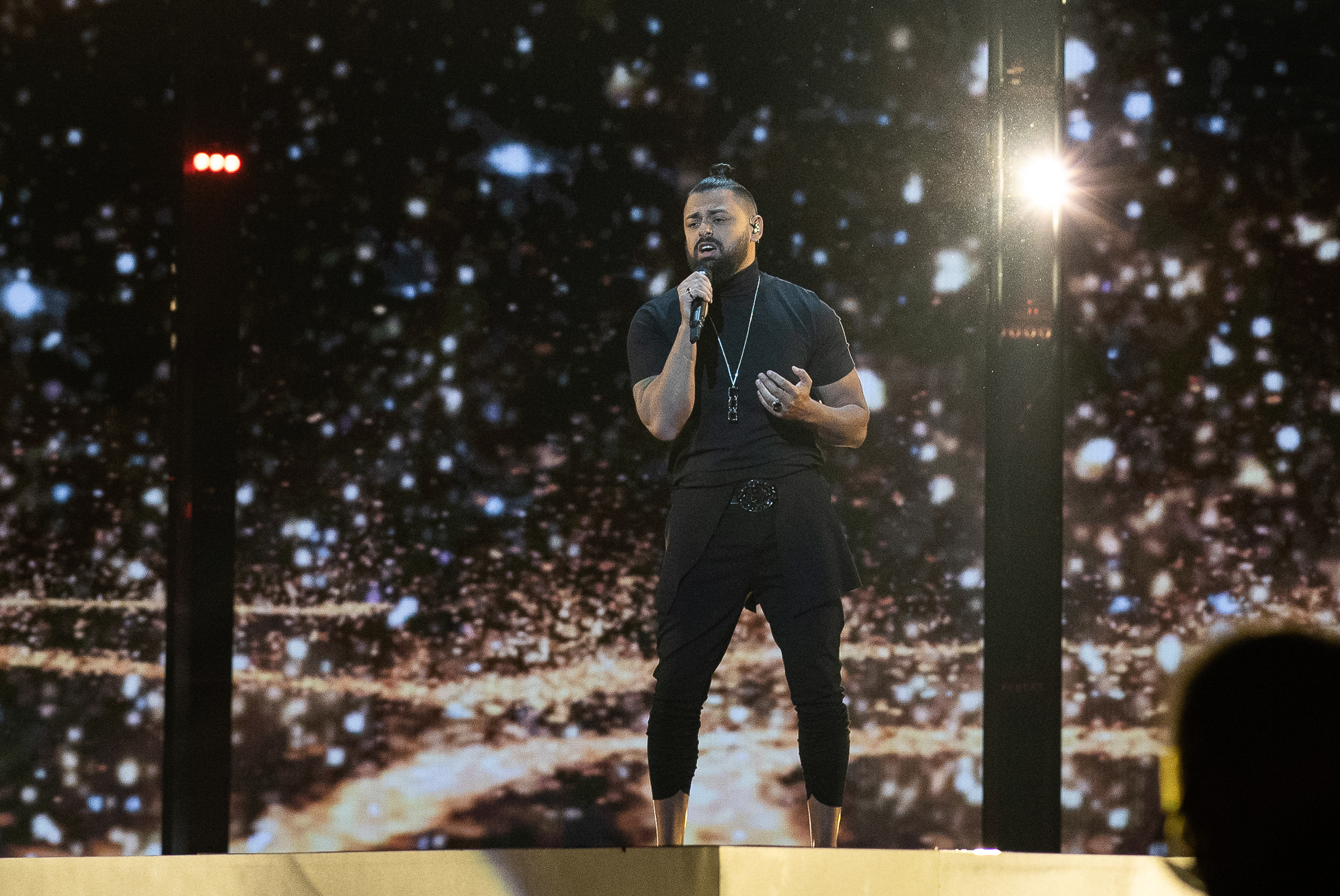
Joci Pápai in Tel Aviv (2019)
