= Charlie (Hungarian singer) =

Hungarian rock and soul singer

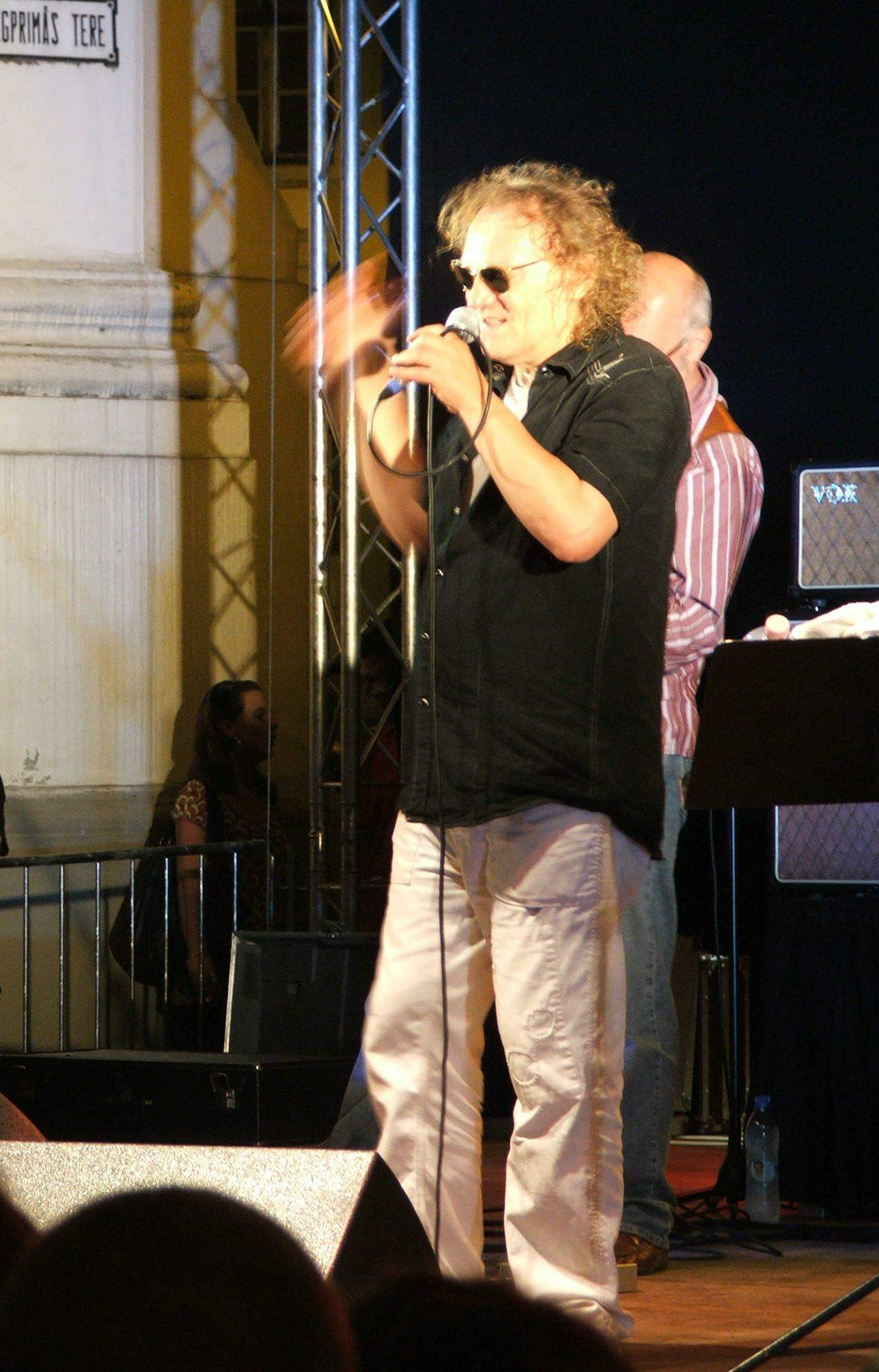
- Charlie performing in 2008

Background information
- Born: Horváth Károly; 28 October 1947 (age 78); Ondód, Hungary
- Genres: Rock; Soul
- Occupation: Singer
- Instrument: Vocals
- Years active: mid 1960s–present

Horváth Károly also known as Charlie, born in Ondód, Hungary, 28 October 1947) is a Hungarian rock and soul singer.

== Biography ==
Originally a ballet dancer, Charlie began singing with Hungarian rock bands in the mid-1960s, and became known nationally as a member of Decca and Olympia. In the 1970s he spent two years in Africa and led a band called Afriaca, which inspired a new interest in funk and soul music. Upon returning to Hungary, he started the band Generál, which toured throughout Europe and released two albums before disbanding in 1979. In 1982 he formed the band Pannonia Express which toured internationally throughout the decade. In 1989, Charlie formed the soul act Tátrai Band with guitarist Tibor Tátrai.

In 1994, Charlie went solo and has released several solo albums, most of which reached the Hungarian charts. He was chosen to represent Hungary in the Eurovision Song Contest 1998 in Birmingham, where he performed his song "A holnap már nem lesz szomorú" ("Sadness Will Be Over Tomorrow"). He finished in 23rd place.

Charlie has received several honorary awards in Hungary, including the Liszt Ferenc Prize (1997) and the Petofi Music Award (2020). He was made an honorary citizen of Budapest in 2018.

Charlie was married to Katalin Széles from 1978 until her death in 2014. His son Ákos is also a musician and the two have collaborated several times.

== Discography ==
- Charlie (1994)
- Mindenki valakié (1995)
- Csak a zene van (1996)
- Just Stay Who You Are (English language album, 1996)
- Annyi minden történt (1997)
- Fűszer cseppenként (1998)
- Greatest Hits (compilation, 1999)
- Jazz (2001)
- Soul & Jazz (2002)
- Majd játszom, mikor érzem (DVD, 2002)
- Funky, Soul & Jazz (2003)
- Trilógia (compilation, 2003)
- Greatest Hits 2 (compilation, 2004)
- Másképp ugyanúgy (2006)
- Platina sorozat (compilation, 2006)
- Mindenen túl (2020)

Awards and achievements
Preceded by V.I.P. with "Miért kell, hogy elmenj?"	Hungary in the Eurovision Song Contest; 1998	Succeeded by Nox with "Forogj, világ!"
