= Hungary in the Eurovision Song Contest 1996 =

- Eurovision Song Contest 1996
- Participating broadcaster: Magyar Televízió (MTV)
- Country: Hungary
- Selection process: National final
- Selection date: 24 February 1996

Competing entry
- Song: "Fortuna"
- Artist: Gjon Delhusa
- Songwriter: Gjon Delhusa

Placement
- Final result: Failed to qualify (23rd)

Participation chronology

Hungary was represented at the qualifying round for the Eurovision Song Contest 1996 with the song "Fortuna", written and performed by Gjon Delhusa. The Hungarian participating broadcaster, Magyar Televízió (MTV), selected its entry through a national final. The entry failed to make it through the pre-selection round.

== Before Eurovision ==
=== National final ===
The national final was organised by Magyar Televízió (MTV) and was held at their studios in Budapest, hosted by István Vágó. 14 songs took part with the winner being chosen by voting from five regional juries, who each awarded 10-7-5-3-1 to their top five songs.

Final – 24 February 1996
R/O	Artist	Song	Points	Place
1	Lancelot	"Fény és árnyék"	6	8
2	Bon-Bon	"Egy rossz dobás"	8	5
3	Boglárka Bokodi	"Egyedül a szél"	8	5
4	Banjoe	"Zöldszemű lány"	0	11
5	Lui	"Élhetnénk szépen"	4	9
6	Te and Én	"Te meg én"	0	11
7	Tanita	"Egy régi dal"	18	4
8	Gjon Delhusa	"Fortuna"	38	1
9	Gyula Éliás	"Jó éjszakát"	4	9
10	Renáta Krassy	"Várlak még"	26	3
11	Judy	"Utazás a szerelembe"	8	5
12	Attila Bodnár	"Szív és vér"	0	11
13	Maxi és a Szirének	"Győzni tudsz"	0	11
14	Anita	"Szerelmes dal"	30	2

== At Eurovision ==
In 1996, for the only time in Eurovision history, an audio-only qualifying round (from which hosts Norway were exempt) was held on 20 March as 29 countries wished to participate in the final but the European Broadcasting Union had set a limit of 22 (plus Norway). The countries occupying the bottom seven places after the pre-qualifier would be unable to take part in the main contest. After the voting, "Fortuna" had received 26 points, tying with Finland for the final 22nd qualifying position, however the spot was awarded to Finland because the country attained a higher top score, eliminating Hungary from the contest.

The contest was broadcast on MTV 2, with commentary by István Vágó.

=== Voting ===
Points awarded to Hungary (qualifying round)
Score	Country
12 points	
10 points	
8 points	
7 points	Romania
6 points	Estonia
5 points	
4 points	
3 points	Croatia; Netherlands
2 points	Cyprus; Greece
1 point	Bosnia and Herzegovina; Denmark; Slovakia

Points awarded by Hungary (qualifying round)
Score	Country
12 points	Netherlands
10 points	Sweden
8 points	Malta
7 points	United Kingdom
6 points	Estonia
5 points	Cyprus
4 points	Macedonia
3 points	Austria
2 points	Ireland
1 point	Denmark
