= Fekete részem =

2018 album by AWS

Studio album by AWS
- Released: October 1, 2018
- Recorded: 2018; Budapest, Hungary
- Studio: Y Sound Studio
- Genres: Alternative Rock; Alternative metal; Post Hardcore; Emo; Pop rock; Hard rock; Metalcore
- Length: 45:50
- Language: Hungarian
- Label: EDGE Records
- Producer: Bence Brucker

AWS chronology
Kint a vízből (2016)	Fekete részem (2018)

Singles from Fekete Részem
- 1. "Viszlát nyár" Released: October 21, 2017; 2. "Hol voltál?" Released: July 15, 2018; 3. "X/0" Released: September 19, 2018; 4. "Fekete részem" Released: October 4, 2018

Fekete részem (translated My Dark Part) is the fourth studio album released by Hungarian Post hardcore band AWS on October 1, 2018, via EDGE Records.

The album consists of 13 tracks, with the last three songs being recorded as bonus material. The bonus songs are "Éjféli lány", a cover of the song of the same name by Hungarian metal band Ossian, and two versions of "Viszlát nyár". The album's running time is 45 minutes and 50 seconds.

Fekete részem peaked at no. 2 at the Hungarian Albums Chart and lasted three weeks in the rankings.

== Background ==
Recording of Fekete részem had started by April 2018. The album was produced, mixed and mastered by the band's guitarist Bence Brucker at Y Sound Studio in Budapest, except for the song "Éjfély lány", a cover version of the song of the same name which was released on the 1990s album A rock katonái by Hungarian metal band Ossian, which was produced by Dániel Kiss.

In an interview with Hungarian radio station Kaposvár Most vocalist Örs Siklósi stated that they could start writing radio friendly tracks due to their successful appearance at the Eurovision Song Contest 2018 in Lisbon, but they decided to write much darker and heavier songs.

The album's artwork was created by Kokái Barnabás of Barber's Art.

The album was officially announced on September 19, 2018.

== Track list ==
No.	Title	Length
1.	"Fekete részem"	3:31
2.	"X/0"	3:18
3.	"Lakatlan ember"	3:38
4.	"Hol voltál?"	3:39
5.	"Éjjeli tánc"	2:49
6.	"Kötelék"	3:52
7.	"Fuss!"	3:55
8.	"Vigyázz rám"	3:11
9.	"Menedék"	3:01
10.	"Egyedül maradtál"	3:55
11.	"Éjféli lány" (Ossian cover, bonus title)	4:19
12.	"Viszlát nyár" (bonus title)	3:26
13.	"Viszlát nyár" (acoustic, bonus title)	3:14

== Releases ==
The first single "Hol voltál?" had already been released in July 2018 alongside a music video. Alongside the album release announcement on September 19, 2018, the band released the second single "X/0".

The album itself was released on CD on October 1, 2018, while a digital release was set for October 12 the same year. On October 4, 2018, AWS announced the release of the single "Fekete részem" alongside a music video. The music video was directed by Péter Tokay of Pixel Films.

In November 2018 a music video for "Lakatlan ember" was released.

== Lyrical themes ==
The lyrics of Fekete részem deal with personal experiences, emotions, and personal views. In an interview singer Örs Siklósi stated the following:

Ha van valami problémád azt ki kell írnod magadból, mert én hiszek abban, hogy ha elénekled és elüvöltözöd a bajaidat, akkor onnantól kezdve sokkal könnyebben tudsz érvényesülni az életben, és sokkal jobban is érzed magad utána a hétköznapokban.

— Örs Siklósi

If you have a problem you have to write about yourself, because I believe, if you sing about your wounds and rub against it you could be more effective in your life and you will feel much more comfortable in the aftermath.

— translated

"X/0" deals with living with a mental illness, especially living with depression. "Lakatlan ember" describes an average man who feels empty and helpless, who hates his own life and who cannot escape this circle to achieve a better life situation. "Hol voltál?" was inspired a robbery in which the vocalist's grandfather was a victim. It deals with absent parents, friends or loved ones who turned their backs on the musicians for reaching their own selfish goals.

"Éjjeli tánc" is about sexuality, which was a huge taboo theme for vocalist Örs Siklósi. "Fuss!" is about the steady process of working in today's society, while the track "Vigyázz rám" is about the emotional relationship between children and their mothers, which Siklósi described as "the most pure and most wonderful emotion".

"Menedék" was inspired by the book The Lower Depths by Russian writer Maxim Gorki and describes a place to hide and seek shelter for people at the edge of society. "Viszlát nyár", which was Hungary's entry for the Eurovision Song Contest 2018, deals about losing a loved one. The song is about Siklósi's father who died in the summer. It was written partly from the point of view of the father.

== Tours ==
The band participated in the Eurovision Song Contest 2018 in Lisbon between May 10–12, 2018 with their song "Viszlát nyár" where they placed 21st out of 26 participants in the final. The band performed at Eurovision pre-parties in Amsterdam and Madrid in the end of April 2018. Due to their appearance at the Eurovision Song Contest, the band was invited to play at Wacken Open Air in August later that year. The band performed at Hungary's own Rockmaraton in July.

On September 27, 2018, the band played a special acoustic concert at Madách Theatre in Budapest. On October 13 the same year, the band played a release party at Barba Negra in Budapest. On October 31, 2018, the band started touring throughout Hungary, Romania and Slovakia with the last concert on March 23, 2019, in Szarvas.

== Reception ==
Professional ratings
Review scores
Source	Rating
Kultúrpart.hu	favorable

In the week of October 18, 2018 Fekete részem peaked at no. 2 in the Hungarian Albums Chart and lasted in the ranking for three weeks. (Note: The Hungarian Albums Chart does not have a personal artist archive, only an overall chart rankings archive instead. A song or an album's duration in the charts must be checked manually.) Their previous records Fata Morgana (Note: The album charted in the week of October 18, 2018 for the first time.) (released 2011), Égésföld (Note: The album reached its peak position on April 13, 2014 and re-entered the charts at no 21 on October 18, 2018.) released 2014 and Kint a vízből (Note: The album reached its peak position on September 9, 2016 and re-entered the charts at no 20 on October 18, 2018.) re-entered the Hungarian Album Charts as well.

Dániel Hári of Kultúrpart.hu wrote the band was able to increase their popularity and received much media coverage due their performance at the Eurovision Song Contest 2018. He described Fekete részem as their most technical album to date with a large musical and lyrical span. Felix Bayer of Spiegel Online described "Vislát nyár" as "a modern metal track with hardcore influences and a great chorus where it is not necessary to know the Hungarian language to sing along". Alex Robert Ross of Vice drew a comparison with American post hardcore band Atreyu.

== Chart performance ==
Chart (2018)	Peak position	Weeks
Hungary (MAHASZ)	2	3
