= Freddie (singer) =

Hungarian singer (born 1990)

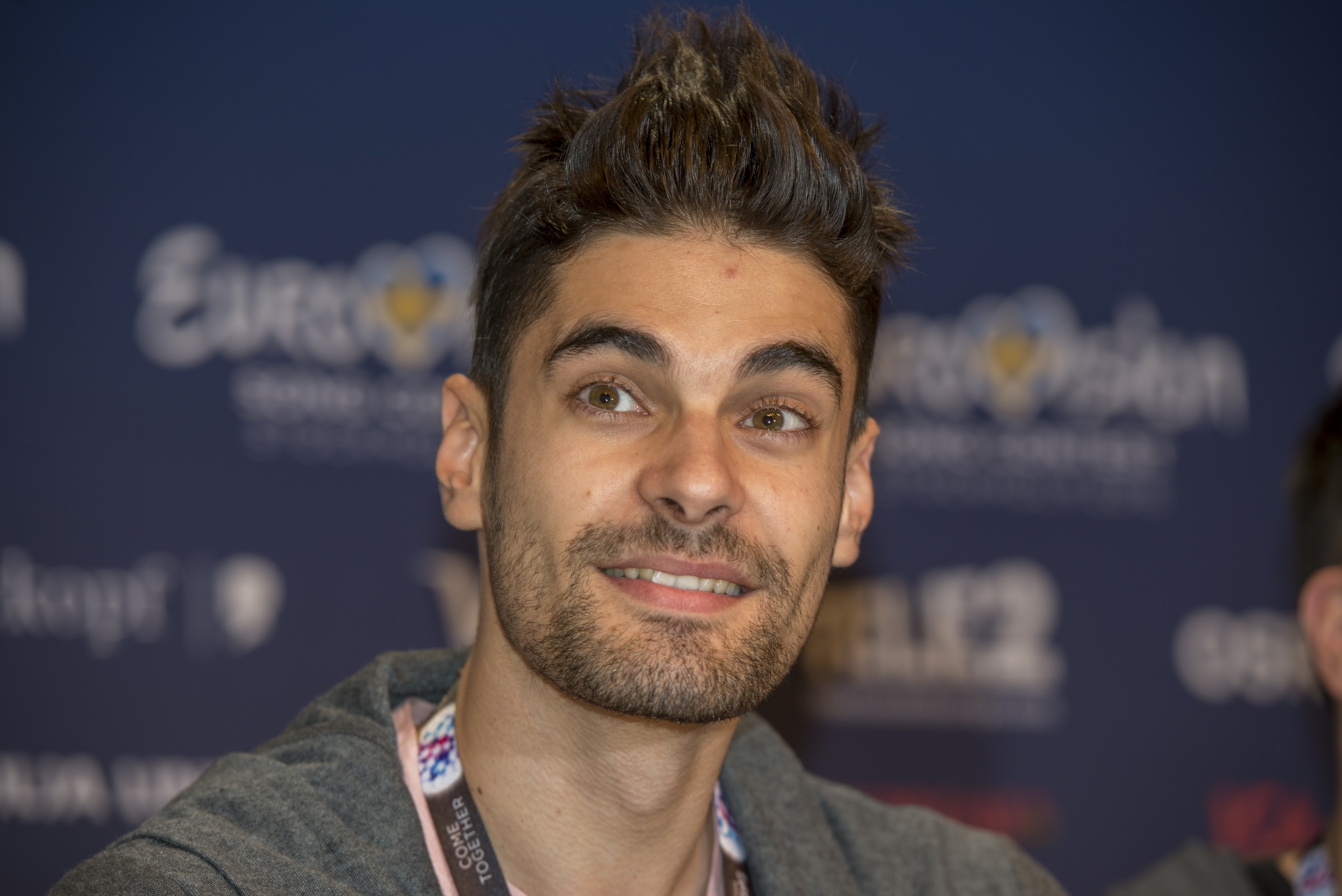
- Freddie at a Eurovision meet and greet in Stockholm in 2016

Background information
- Born: Gábor Alfréd Fehérvári; 8 April 1990 (age 35); Győr, Hungary
- Genres: Pop; pop rock; R&B
- Occupation: Singer
- Instrument: Vocals
- Years active: 2010–present
- Labels: Misztral Music
- Website: http://www.fehervarigaboralfred.hu/

Gábor Alfréd Fehérvári (born 8 April 1990), known by his stage name Freddie, is a Hungarian singer. He first came to prominence after placing fourth in the first season of the Hungarian version of Rising Star. He later became the Hungarian representative in the Eurovision Song Contest 2016.

== Career ==
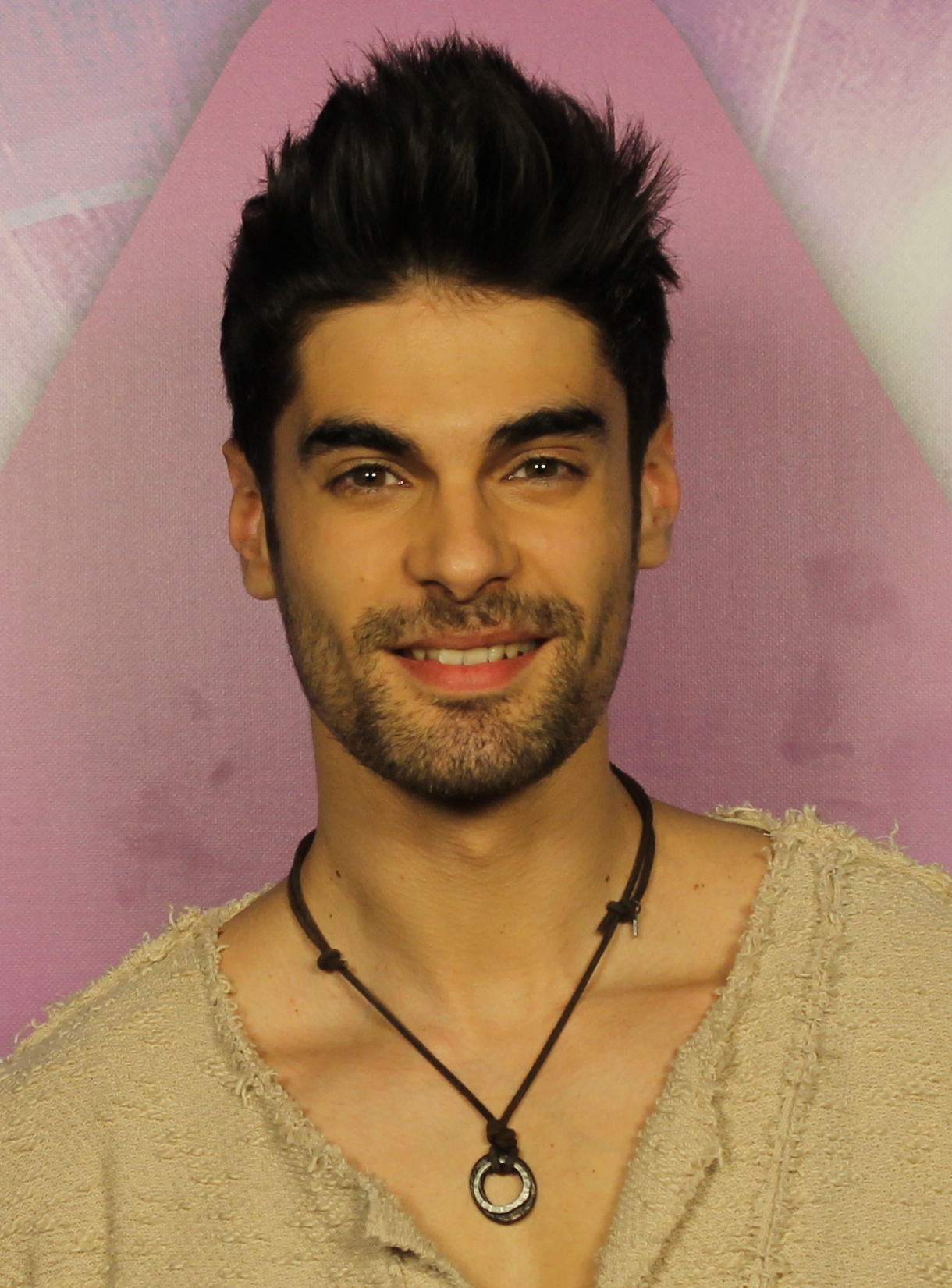
Freddie after winning A Dal in early 2016.

Freddie's grandfather was Hungarian football coach Alfréd Fehérvári (1925–2007). Freddie studied at a commercial college before his music career, and worked as an assistant in Győr. By 2010, he had not only sung but also played guitar in small bands. Freddie first performed professionally in the Hungarian version of Rising Star. He reached the top twelve, then top six and then in the top four qualifiers. In the finals, he finished in fourth place. After Rising Star, collaborating with András Kállay-Saunders, Freddie performed his first original song, "Mary Joe", and reached the Petőfi Radio Top 30 list. It became one of the domestic summer hits of 2015. He began performing under his stage name Freddie in Autumn 2015.

In December 2015, it was announced that Freddie would participate in A Dal 2016 with the song "Pioneer". He won A Dal and represented his home country in the Eurovision Song Contest 2016 in May 2016, reaching the final and coming in 19th place overall. He also hosted A Dal 2018, along with Krisztina Rátonyi.

== Discography ==
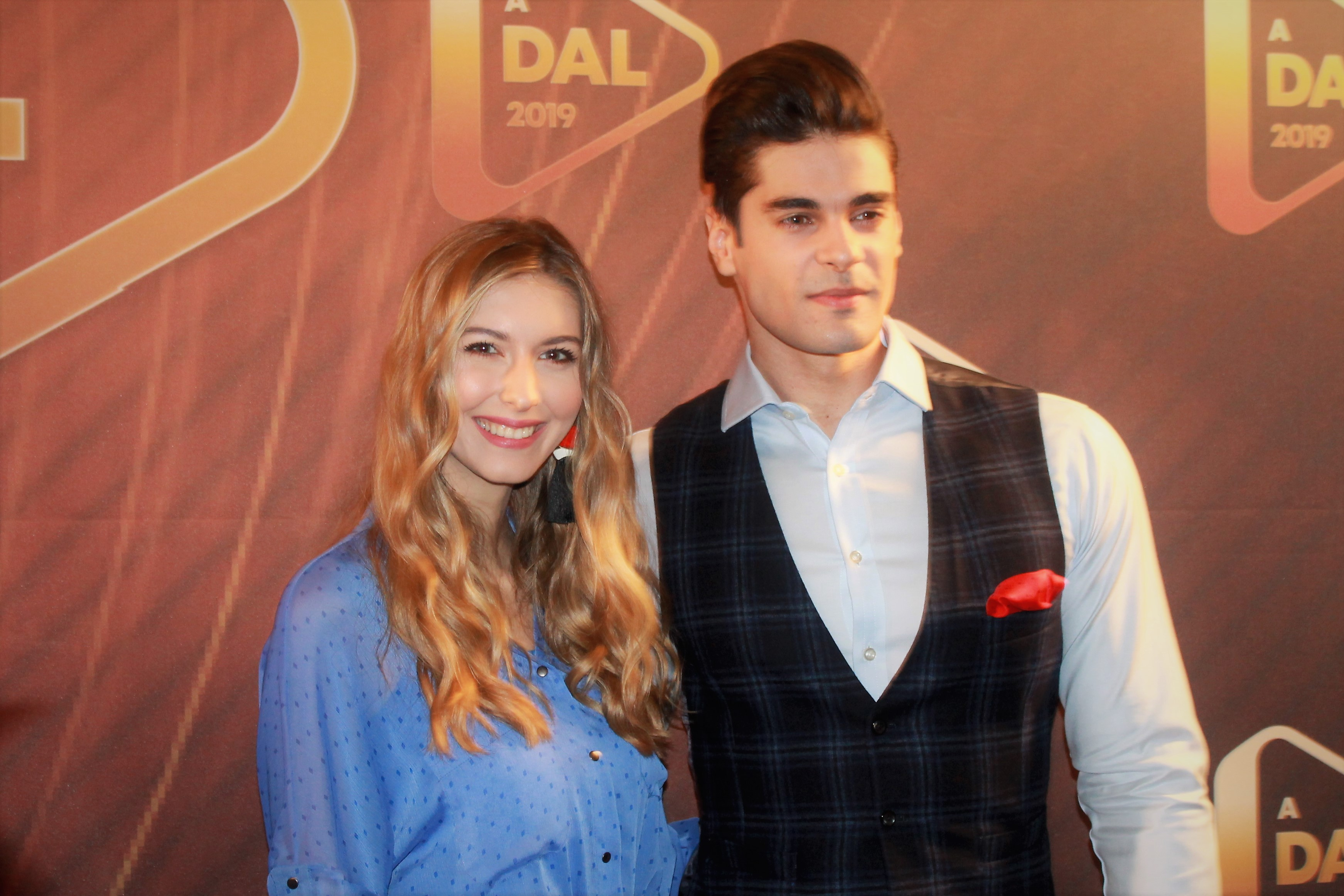
Freddie (right) in 2019

=== Studio albums ===
List of studio albums, with selected details
Title	Album details	Peak chart positions
Title	Album details	HUN
Pioneers	Released: 15 November 2016; Label: Misztral Music; Formats: CD, Digital download, streaming	29
Szabadon	Released: 8 May 2023; Label: Freddie Music; Formats: CD, Digital download, streaming	—

=== Extended plays ===
Title	Details
Live Sessions	Released: 16 May 2022; Label: Freddie Music; Formats: Digital download, streaming

=== Singles ===
Single	Year	Peak chart positions		Album
Single	Year	HUN	SWE	Album
"Mary Joe"	2015	—	—	Pioneers
"Neked nem kell"	2015	—	—	Pioneers
"Pioneer"	2015	1	— (Note: "Pioneer" did not enter the Sverigetopplistan, but peaked at number 3 on the Swedish Heatseekers chart.)	Pioneers
"Na jó, Hello"	2016	—	—	Pioneers
"Ez a vihar"	2017	9	—	Pioneers
"Csodák"	2017	21	—	Pioneers
"Nincsen holnap"	2017	30	—	Pioneers
"Otthon bárhol" (with Janicsák Veca, Manoya, & Biga)	2018	35	—	Non-album singles
"Csakazértis szerelem" (with Dallos Bogi)	2018	— (Note: "Csakazértis szerelem" did not enter the Single Top 40 and Rádiós Top 40, but peaked at number 22 on the Magyar Rádiós Top 40 chart.)	—	Non-album singles
"Már nem számít"	2018	32	—	Non-album singles
"Élet"	2018	—	—	Non-album singles
"Napló"	2019	27	—	Non-album singles
"Fúj minket a szél"	2020	— (Note: "Fúj minket a szél" did not enter the Single Top 40 and Rádiós Top 40, but peaked at number 28 on the Magyar Rádiós Top 40 chart.)	—	Non-album singles
"Mindig itt maradsz"	2020	27	—	Non-album singles
"Ezt akartad"	2020	—	—	Non-album singles
"Sebtapasz"	2022	—	—	Non-album singles
"Like a Stone"	2022	—	—	Non-album singles
"Túlerő"	2022	—	—	Non-album singles
"My Way"	2022	—	—	Non-album singles
"Örökké zenél"	2023	—	—	Szabadon
"Szivod a vérem"	2023	—	—	Szabadon

== Notes ==
Awards and achievements
Preceded by Boggie with "Wars for Nothing"	Hungary in the Eurovision Song Contest; 2016	Succeeded by Joci Pápai with "Origo"
