= Az én apám =

Song by Hungarian singer Joci Pápai

Single by Joci Pápai
- Released: 23 December 2018
- Length: 3:01
- Label: Origo Produkció
- Songwriters: József Pápai; Ferenc Molnár Caramel

Joci Pápai singles chronology
"Kirakós" (2018)	"Az én apám" (2018)

Eurovision Song Contest 2019 entry
- Country: Hungary
- Artist: Joci Pápai
- Languages: Hungarian
- Composers: József Pápai; Ferenc Molnár Caramel
- Lyricist: Ferenc Molnár Caramel

Finals performance
- Semi-final result: 12th
- Semi-final points: 97
- Final result: Did not qualify

Entry chronology
- ◄ "Viszlát nyár" (2018)

"Az én apám" ([ˈɒz ˈeːn ˈɒpaːm]; English: My father) is a song by Hungarian singer Joci Pápai. It represented Hungary in the Eurovision Song Contest 2019 in Tel Aviv, Israel. The song is a mid-tempo ballad about Pápai's childhood memories. It runs at 96 BPM and has elements from Hungarian folk music. The song did not gain enough points to qualify for the final.

== Eurovision Song Contest ==
The song was selected to represent Hungary in the Eurovision Song Contest 2019. It was chosen in the 2019 series of A Dal, Hungary's national selection process for the Eurovision Song Contest. On 28 January 2019, a special allocation draw was held which placed each country into one of the two semi-finals, as well as which half of the show they would perform in. Hungary was placed into the first semi-final, to be held on 14 May 2019, and was scheduled to perform in the first half of the show. Once all the competing songs for the 2019 contest had been released, the running order for the semi-finals was decided by the show's producers rather than through another draw, so that similar songs were not placed next to each other. Hungary performed in position 7. Hungary failed to gain enough points to place in the top ten and failed to qualify for the final for the first time since 2010 (when Hungary did not compete).

== Track listing ==
Digital download
No.	Title	Length
1.	"Az én apám"	3:01

Digital download
No.	Title	Length
1.	"Az én apám" (ESC version)	3:03
2.	"Az én apám" (karaoke version)	3:03

== Charts ==
Chart (2018)	Peak position
Hungary (Rádiós Top 40)	24
Hungary (Single Top 40)	2
Hungary (Stream Top 40)	31
Hungary (Magyar Top 40)	11
