= Viszlát nyár =

2017 single by AWS

Single by AWS

from the album Fekete részem
- Released: 21 October 2017
- Genre: Post hardcore, metalcore
- Length: 3:25
- Label: EDGE
- Songwriters: Dániel Kökényes; Bence Brucker; Áron Veress; Soma Schiszler; Örs Siklósi
- Producers: Dániel Kökényes; Bence Brucker; Áron Veress; Soma Schiszler

AWS singles chronology
"Hajnali járat" (2016)	"Viszlát nyár" (2017)	"Hol voltál?" (2018)

Music video
- "Viszlát nyár" on YouTube

(Hungary) "Viszlát nyár"

Eurovision Song Contest 2018 entry
- Country: Hungary
- Artist: AWS
- Language: Hungarian
- Composers: Dániel Kökényes; Bence Brucker; Áron Veress; Soma Schiszler
- Lyricist: Örs Siklósi

Finals performance
- Semi-final result: 10th
- Semi-final points: 111
- Final result: 21st
- Final points: 93

Entry chronology
- ◄ "Origo" (2017)
- "Az én apám" (2019) ►

"Viszlát nyár" ([ˈvislaːt ˈɲaːr]; "Summer, Gone") is a song performed by Hungarian heavy metal band AWS. The song was released as a digital download on 21 October 2017 through EDGE Records and was written by Dániel Kökényes, Bence Brucker, Áron Veress, Soma Schiszler, and Örs Siklósi. It represented Hungary in the Eurovision Song Contest 2018 in Lisbon, Portugal.

== Eurovision Song Contest ==
AWS was confirmed as one of the entrants in A Dal 2018, the Hungarian national selection for the Eurovision Song Contest 2018, on 6 December 2017. They went on to compete in the second heat on 27 January 2018, and advanced to the semi-finals through the jury vote. They later competed in the second semi-final on 17 February 2018 and were able to qualify to the finals via the jury vote. The final was held on 24 February, where the song was declared the winner after winning the public vote.

The song competed in the second semi-final, held on 10 May 2018 in Lisbon, Portugal.

== Composition ==
Viszlát nyár is lyrically about the singer Örs Siklósi's deceased father. The song runs at 164 BPM.

== Track listing ==
Digital download
No.	Title	Length
1.	"Viszlát nyár"	3:25

== Charts ==
=== Weekly charts ===
Chart (2018)	Peak position
Hungary (Single Top 40)	1
Hungary (Stream Top 40)	11

=== Year-end charts ===
Year-end chart performance for "Viszlát nyár"
Chart (2018)	Position
Hungary (MAHASZ)	50

== Release history ==
Region	Date	Format	Label
Various	21 October 2017	Digital download	EDGE
