= Alfréd Fehérvári =

Hungarian footballer and coach

Personal information
- Birth name: Alfréd Grédinger
- Date of birth: 18 November 1925
- Place of birth: Vienna, Austria
- Date of death: 30 March 2007 (age 81)
- Place of death: Hungary
- Position: Midfielder

Youth career
- 1941–1944: Moson Kühne

Senior career*
Years	Team	Apps	(Gls)
1945–1947	Integrál-DAC		
1947–1960	Győri ETO FC		

International career
- Hungary

Managerial career
- 1970–1972: Szombathelyi Haladás
- * Club domestic league appearances and goals

Alfréd Fehérvári (Grédinger) (18 November 1925 – 30 March 2007) was a Hungarian football player (as midfielder) and, later, coach. He began his football career with Moson Kühne. Between 1945 and 1947, he played in Integrál-DAC, and from the autumn of 1947 to 1960, Győri ETO FC. He retired in 1960, with around 13 seasons as a footballer. Between 1970 and 1972, he was head coach at Szombathelyi Haladás, coaching 67 games. He was, for two years, the department head for Győri ETO FC. He died in 2007.

His grandson, Freddie, is a Hungarian singer who represented Hungary at Eurovision Song Contest 2016.

== Championships ==
- Nemzeti Bajnokság I: 1952, 1953

== Sources ==
- NB I Football statistics from the National Archive pages
- Fehérvári as coach
- Fehérvári's obituary
