= Pioneer (song) =

2015 single by Freddie

Single by Freddie
- Released: 30 December 2015
- Recorded: 2015
- Genre: Power pop
- Length: 3:00
- Label: Misztral Music
- Songwriter: Borbála Csarnai
- Producer: Zé Szabó

Freddie singles chronology
"Neked nem kell" (2015)	"Pioneer" (2015)	"Na Jó, Hello" (2016)

Eurovision Song Contest 2016 entry
- Country: Hungary
- Artist: Freddie
- Language: English
- Composer: Zé Szabó
- Lyricist: Borbála Csarnai

Finals performance
- Semi-final result: 4th
- Semi-final points: 197
- Final result: 19th
- Final points: 108

Entry chronology
- ◄ "Wars for Nothing" (2015)
- "Origo" (2017) ►

"Pioneer" is a song performed by Hungarian singer Freddie. The song represented Hungary in the Eurovision Song Contest 2016, and reached the 19th position in the final. The song was written by Borbála Csarnai, while production was handled by Zé Szabó. The song was released as a digital download on 30 December 2015 through Misztral Music.

== Eurovision Song Contest ==
Freddie was announced as one of the 30 competing artists in A Dal 2016 on 15 December 2015. He competed in the first heat and advanced to the semi-finals through jury voting. In the second semi-final, he advanced to the final once again through the jury. In the final, he won both the jury and televote, winning the competition.

He represented Hungary in the Eurovision Song Contest 2016 in Stockholm, Sweden, performing in the first half of the first semi-final. He qualified for the final and reached the 19th position there with 108 points.

== Track listing ==
Digital download
No.	Title	Length
1.	"Pioneer"	2:58

== Charts ==
Chart (2016)	Peak position
Hungary (Rádiós Top 40)	9
Hungary (Single Top 40)	1
Hungary (Stream Top 40)	26
Sweden Heatseekers (Sverigetopplistan)	3

== Release history ==
Region	Date	Format	Label
Worldwide	30 December 2015	Digital download	Misztral Music
