= Gabi Szklenár =

Hungarian singer

Baby Gabi (Gabriella Szklenár, Gabi Szklenár) (born May 26, 1978, Budapest) is a Hungarian pop singer.

She was a member of the girl group Baby Sisters while it was active (1996-2001). She started her solo career as Baby Gabi in 2003.

== Solo albums ==
- 2003: Van-e helyem?
- 2004: Hazudj még nekem!
- 2005: Szivárvány
- 2007: Duett Album
- 2008: Csupa szív
- 2010: Elmond6om
- 2012: Lírák
