= Origo (song) =

2017 song by Joci Pápai

Single by Joci Pápai
- Released: 4 January 2017
- Length: 3:23
- Label: Magneoton
- Songwriter: József Pápai

Joci Pápai singles chronology
"Senki más" (2016)	"Origo" (2017)	"Özönvíz" (2017)

Eurovision Song Contest 2017 entry
- Country: Hungary
- Artist: Joci Pápai
- Language: Hungarian
- Composer: József Pápai
- Lyricist: József Pápai

Finals performance
- Semi-final result: 2nd
- Semi-final points: 231
- Final result: 8th
- Final points: 200

Entry chronology
- ◄ "Pioneer" (2016)
- "Viszlát nyár" (2018) ►

"Origo" (English: Origin) is a song written and performed by Hungarian singer and rapper Joci Pápai. The song was released as a digital download on 4 January 2017 through Magneoton. It represented Hungary in the Eurovision Song Contest 2017.

== Eurovision Song Contest ==
On 8 December 2016, Pápai was announced as one of the competitors in A Dal 2017, Hungary's national selection for the Eurovision Song Contest 2017. He advanced from the third heat on 4 February 2017, and the first semi-final on 10 February, to the final, held on 18 February, where he was declared the winner. Pápai competed in the first half of the second semi-final at the Eurovision Song Contest on 11 May 2017 and was subsequently qualified for the Grand Final.

== Track listing ==
Digital download
No.	Title	Length
1.	"Origo"	3:23

== Charts ==
Chart (2017)	Peak position
Hungary (Rádiós Top 40)	14
Hungary (Single Top 40)	2
Hungary (Stream Top 40)	6
Netherlands (Dutch Single Tip)	12
Sweden (Sverigetopplistan)	97
Switzerland (Schweizer Hitparade)	70

== Certifications ==
Region	Certification	Certified units/sales
Hungary (MAHASZ)	7× Platinum	21,000^{‡}
^{‡} Sales+streaming figures based on certification alone.

== Release history ==
Region	Date	Format	Label
Worldwide	4 January 2017	Digital download	Magneoton
