= Karácsony =

Karácsony is a Hungarian surname, which means Christmas. Notable people with the surname include:

- Gergely Karácsony (born 1975), Hungarian politician
- Gyula Karácsony (born 1956), Hungarian sport shooter
