= Zene – Mindenki másképp csinálja =

Studio album by Locomotiv GT
- Released: 1977
- Recorded: 1977
- Studio: MHV, Budapest
- Genre: Rock
- Length: 40:58
- Label: Pepita

Locomotiv GT chronology
Locomotiv GT V. (1976)	Zene – Mindenki másképp csinálja (1977)	Mindenki (1978)

Zene – Mindenki másképp csinálja (‘Music – Everybody does it in a different way’) is the sixth studio album by Hungarian rock supergroup Locomotiv GT, released in 1977. It was the first LGT album with new drummer János Solti and lyricist Dusán Sztevánovity (a former member of 1960s rock band Metró).

== Track listing ==
=== Side one ===
1. "A Rádió" (Gábor Presser, Dusán Sztevánovity) – 6:04
2. "Egy elkésett dal (S.R. emlékére)" (Presser, Sztevánovity, Presser) – 5:51
3. "Jóbarátok vagyunk" (Presser) – 3:54
4. "A Hajnal" (Tamás Somló) – 1:15
5. "Engedj el" (János Karácsony, Sztevánovity) – 3:47

=== Side two ===
1. "Mindenki másképp csinálja" (Presser, Sztevánovity) – 6:18
2. "Visszatérés" (Somló, Sztevánovity) – 5:51
3. "Aquincumi séta" (Karácsony) – 1:21
4. "Boogie a zongorán" (Somló, Sztevánovity) – 3:45
5. "A Búcsú" (Presser) – 3:10

== Personnel ==
- Gábor Presser – Yamaha & Fender pianos, clavinet, accordion, Hohner strings, ARP Axxe, percussion, vocals
- Tamás Somló – bass guitar, alto saxophone, soprano saxophone, harmonica, percussion, vocals
- János Karácsony – guitars, percussion, vocals
- János Solti – drums, percussion

with:

- László Dés – saxophone
- István Bergendy – saxophone
- Károly Friedrich – trombone
- László Gőz – trombone
- Endre Sipos – trumpet
- Gyula Bellai – horn
- László Balogh – horn
- László Mészáros – horn
- Ferenc Demjén – vocal (3)
- Zorán Sztevanovity – vocal (3)

=== Production ===
- Pál Péterdi – Music director
- György Kovács – Sound engineer
- András Harmati – Graphics
