= Ringasd el magad =

Studio album by Locomotiv GT
- Released: 1972
- Recorded: 1972
- Studio: MHV Studios, Budapest,
- Genre: Rock; blues rock; progressive rock
- Length: 42:43
- Label: MHV (Hungary); Supraphon, CS Hifi Klub, MHV Pepita (Czechoslovakia)

Locomotiv GT chronology
Locomotiv GT (1971)	Ringasd el magad (1972)	Bummm! (1973)

Ringasd el magad is the second studio album by Hungarian rock supergroup Locomotiv GT, released in 1972. Its instrumentation was worked out and rehearsed in Budapest, the album was recorded at MHV Studios also in the Hungarian capital, whereas the running order was put together by the band at a restaurant on Oxford Street, London. Although the style of the band was basically the same, the sound and stylistic diversity of the songs show a considerable progress. While on Locomotiv GT they used electric instruments almost exclusively, the instrumentation of Ringasd el magad is much more complex.

The songs reflect the influence of many genres. Because of the longer instrumental sections, the album opener "Cirkusz", "Kotta nélkül", and "Azt hittem" can be labelled as progressive rock. The long, distorted organ solo heard in "Kotta nélkül" makes the song the most reminiscent of that genre. "Lincoln fesztivál blues", "Megvárlak ma délben", and "Ringasd el magad" resemble to blues-rock. "Lincoln fesztivál blues", the first instrumental song of the group, was inspired by the Great Western Express Festival, held in Lincoln, Lincolnshire, between 26 and 29 May 1972, where LGT was the only performer coming from the continent. The version of "Ringasd el magad" featured on the album is not the same as the one that opens the group’s next release, Bummm!; it is largely instrumental and barely longer than one minute. "A semmi kertje" is a seminal fusion of blues-rock and Japanese music. The softly sung verses are accompanied by vibraphone and bass; the choruses are louder, harder, and are accompanied by the whole band. The Japanese expression "mite kudasai", repeated at the end of each chorus, means "please, look" in English. The unusual sound is probably connected to the group’s performance at the World Popular Song Festival in Tokyo in 1971. The elegiac "Szerenád – szerelmemnek, ha lenne" is the first of Gábor Presser’s piano ballads that he would perform mostly alone. It has a lot in common with the songs "Arra mennék én" and "Ahogy mindenki" on the albums Mindig magasabbra and Locomotiv GT V., respectively. "A szerelem börtönében" and "Ne szédíts" are melodic pop rock songs. The country-spoof "Kakukkos karóra" is an interesting and unusual recording; it is all-acoustic (with the addition of a banjo), and disguised, with clapping, as a spontaneous live performance.

Ringasd el magad was the last album of LGT to feature Károly Frenreisz as bassist. He would leave the band in January 1973, and form his own band Skorpió that same year. Also in 1973, Ringasd el magad was issued in Czechoslovakia by Supraphon, CS Hifi Klub and the Hungarian MHV Pepita label. Its cover art was the same, but the song titles and other information were written in Czech.

An unreleased version of the album includes a different take of the song Kotta nélkül, as well as an additional piano track in the song Azt hittem, which was omitted from the actual LP, and slightly extended versions of several other tracks.

The black and white cover photograph is a manipulated image. The original picture ironically shows the two former Omega members, Presser and Laux standing next to each other on one side, and at some distance from them Barta standing next to Frenreisz.

== Track listing ==
=== Side one ===
1. "Cirkusz" (Tamás Barta, Anna Adamis) – 4:30
2. "A szerelem börtönében" (Gábor Presser, Adamis) – 3:08
3. "Szerenád – szerelmemnek, ha lenne" (Presser) – 2:25
4. "A semmi kertje" (Károly Frenreisz, Adamis) – 4:30
5. "Lincoln fesztivál blues" (Barta, Frenreisz) – 4:58

=== Side two ===
1. "Ne szédíts" (Frenreisz, Adamis) – 3:20
2. "Kakukkos karóra" (Barta, Adamis) – 2:01
3. "Kotta nélkül" (Presser, Adamis) – 6:34
4. "Azt hittem" (Barta, Presser) – 5:26
5. "Megvárlak ma délben" (Frenreisz) – 3:56
6. "Ringasd el magad" (Presser, Adamis) – 1:09

== Personnel ==
- Tamás Barta – electric, acoustic, and slide guitar, banjo, vocals, lead vocals (B2)
- Gábor Presser – Hammond organ, piano, electric piano, thumb piano, vibraphone, marimba, sound generator (Moog synthesizer), vocals, lead vocals (A 1-3, B 3,4,6)
- Károly Frenreisz – Fender bass, soprano saxophone, tenor saxophone, flute, oboe, vocals, lead vocals (A4, B1,5)
- József Laux – Ludwig drums, percussion
- Anna Adamis – lyrics
- Sarolta Zalatnay
- Bartók Kamarakórus conducted by Mihály Tóth

=== Production ===
- Judit Lukács – engineer
- Zoltán Hézser – executive producer
- István Bara, Tamás Féner – photos
- György Kemény – cover art

== Release history ==
Region	Date	Label	Format	Catalog	Notes
Hungary	1972	MHV Pepita	stereo LP	SLPX 17449	
Czechoslovakia	1973	Supraphon – CS Hifi Klub – MHV Pepita	stereo LP	1 13 1409	Licensed album issued in Czechoslovakia.
Hungary	1991	Hungaroton Mega	stereo LP	SLPM 37529 (91/M-004)	Part of A Locomotiv GT összes nagylemeze box set.
Hungary	1992	Hungaroton-Gong	CD	HCD 37529 (92/M-004)	Part of A Locomotiv GT összes nagylemeze box set.
