= Mindenki =

Studio album by Locomotiv GT
- Released: 1978
- Recorded: 1978
- Studios: Mafilm music room, Budapest
- Genre: Rock
- Length: 39:09
- Label: Pepita

Locomotiv GT chronology
Zene – Mindenki másképp csinálja (1977)	Mindenki (1978)	Loksi (1980)

Mindenki (‘Everybody’) is the seventh Hungarian language studio album by Hungarian rock supergroup Locomotiv GT released in late autumn 1978. The band recorded the album without guest musicians. This was the first Locomotiv GT album without guests since the Mindig magasabbra album in 1975. The album was also released in Czechoslovakia.

== Track listing ==
=== Side One ===
1. "Mindenféle emberek" (Gábor Presser, Dusán Sztevánovity) – 5:11
2. "Nézd, az őrült" (Presser, Sztevánovity) – 5:45
3. "Baba – Rock" (Tamás Somló) – 5:01
4. "Mi lesz velem?" (Presser) – 3:42

=== Side Two ===
1. "Hirdetés" (Presser, Sztevánovity) – 6:22
2. "A Téma" (János Karácsony, Sztevánovity) – 4:37
3. "Az utolsó szerelmes dal" (Karácsony, Ferenc Demjén) – 3:40
4. "Nem adom fel" (Presser, Stevánovity) – 4:17

== Personnel ==
- Gábor Presser – Yamaha electric grand piano, Yamaha grand piano, ARP Axxe, clavinet, percussion, vocals
- Tamás Somló – bass guitar, saxophone, percussion, vocals
- János Karácsony – guitars, percussion, Moog synthesizer, vocals
- János Solti – drums, percussion

=== Production ===
- Péter Péterdi – Music director
- György Kovács – Sound engineer
- András Alapfy – Graphics
