= Gábor Presser =

Hungarian musician and composer (born 1948)

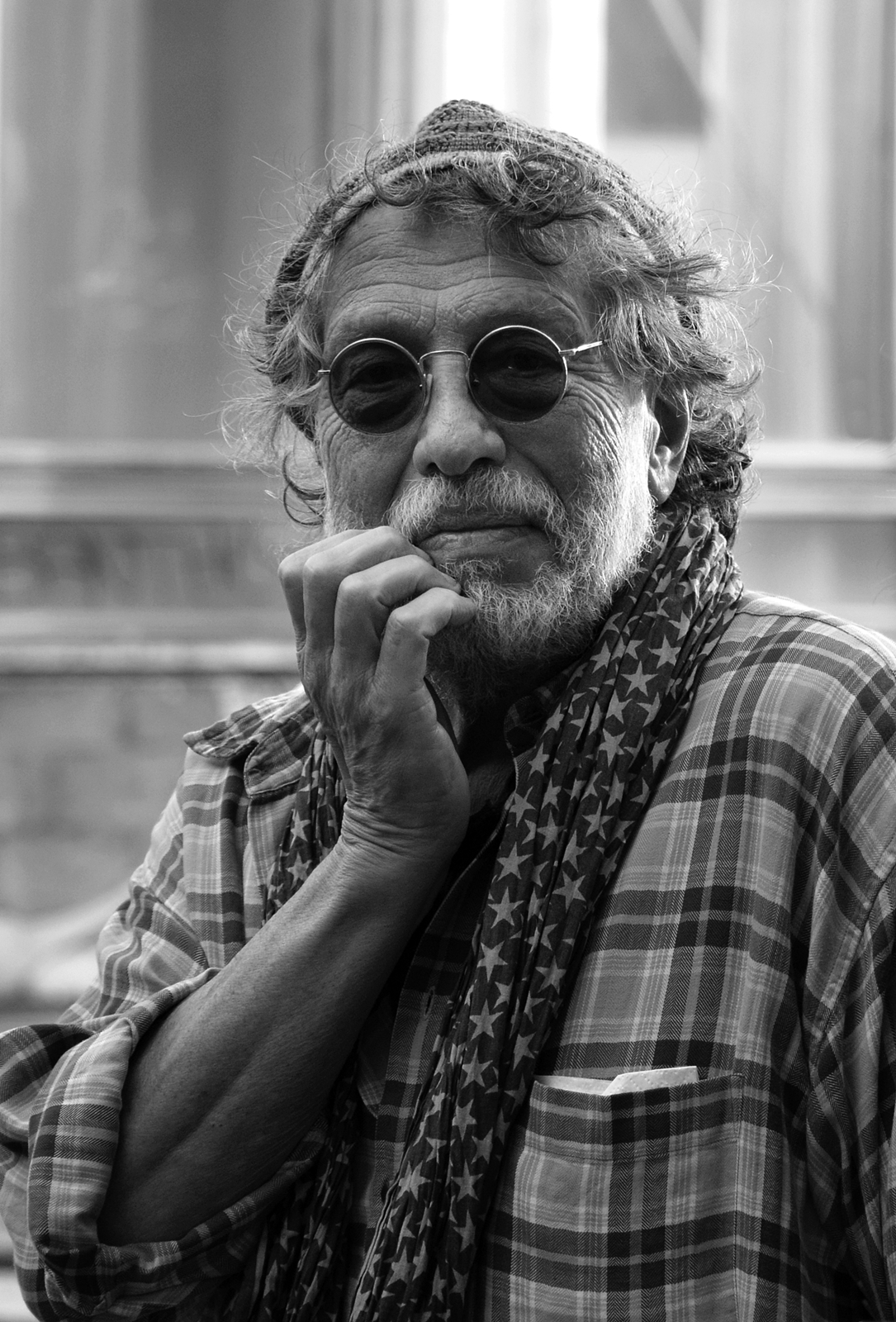
- Presser in 2022
- Born: 27 May 1948 (age 78); Budapest, Hungary
- Other names: Pici; Gabor Presser
- Years active: 1967–present
- Musical career
- Genres: Rock; pop; musical theatre; electronic
- Occupations: Composer; musician; singer; songwriter
- Instruments: Vocals; piano; organ
- Labels: Pepita; Qualiton; BMG; Sony BMG
- Formerly of: Omega; Locomotiv GT
- Website: pressergabor.hu

Gábor Presser (born 27 May 1948) is a Kossuth Prize winning Hungarian musician, composer, singer. He was a band member in Locomotiv GT and Omega, and has been a prominent personality in Hungarian pop and rock music.

== Biography ==
=== Early life ===
Born in Budapest in 1948, his parents are Géza Presser and Elvira Uhrman. His father worked as a poultry dealer in the Great Market hall at Klauzál square. After school, Gábor went out to help his father. Presser started playing the piano at the age of four, the pianist Imre Antal acknowledged the child's talents and predicted that he would become a great artist. He finished his studies at a primary school in Kertész street, and subsequently started his studies at the Music High School. Meanwhile, he played piano at a street dancing school in Kapás street for a 14 HUF hourly rate. He started composing as a teenager. The family lived at Dob street 46/B on the first floor, and above their home lived composer and pianist Rezső Seress. Presser was already a teenager, and he often talked up Seress who showed him records and sheet music. Seress listened every day from 2 to 6 pm to different arrangements of the Gloomy Sunday, which were broadcast to the surrounding homes. Presser later reflected on these memories in his song Plafon, of which Lajos Parti Nagy wrote the text.

=== Omega (1967–1971) ===
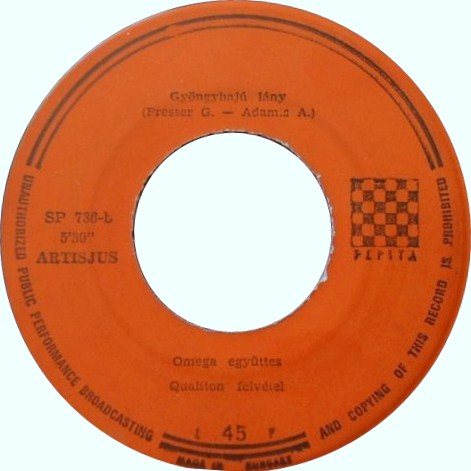
Omega "Gyöngyhajú lány" single, composed by Presser.

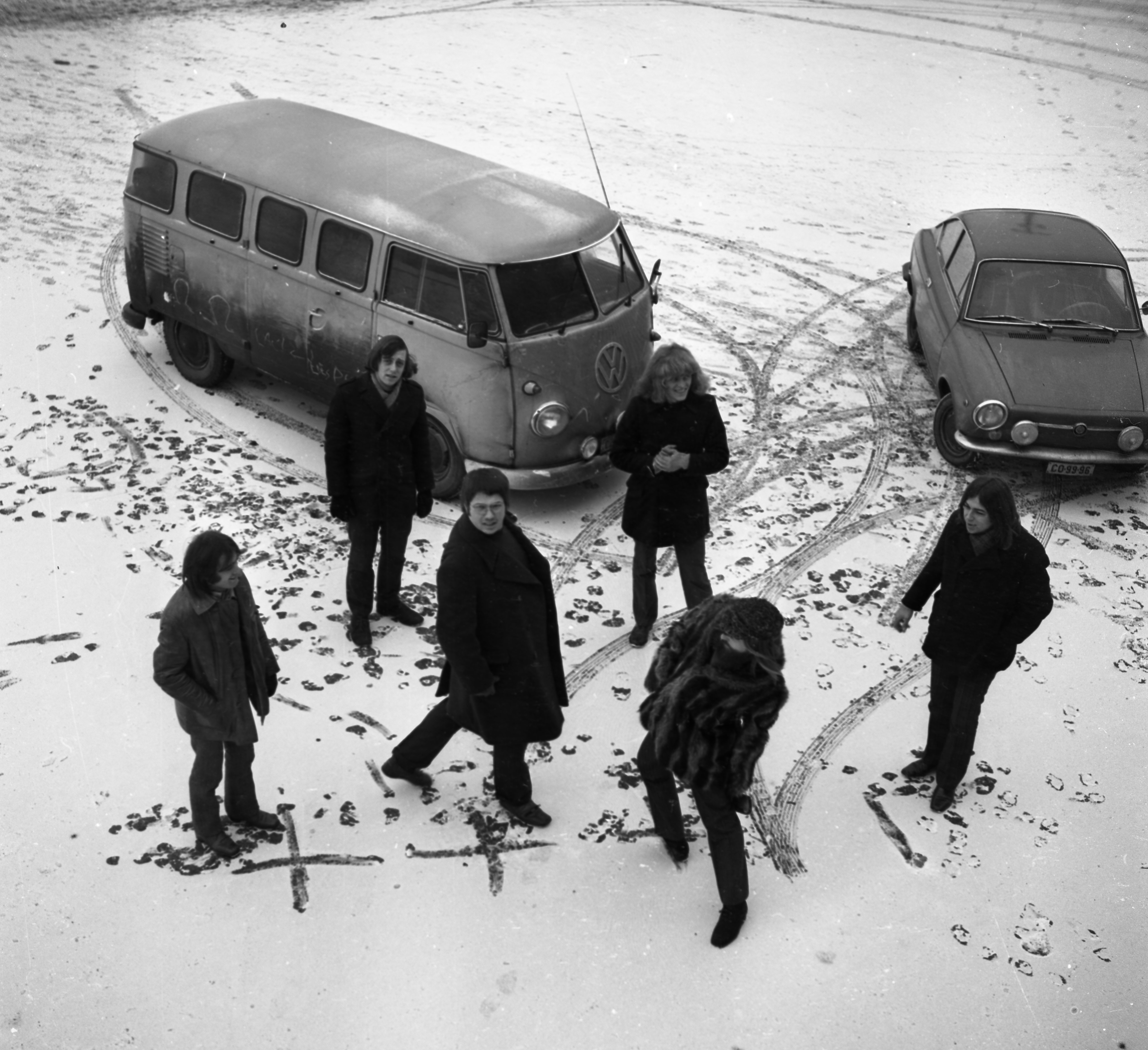
Omega in 1970

During high school Presser was only interested in classical music, but his classmate Tamás Mihály took him to concerts of the band Scampolo, where he occasionally played. In 1967 Presser started to write his own songs for Omega (until then they were only playing covers of foreign hits). In the summer, he became one of the band's musicians playing on keyboards. The band tried out a unique arrangements: no solo guitarist, but two keyboardists. The arrangement was initially not very successful and Presser was replaced by György Molnár guitarist. During this time, he played with Scampolo and started writing songs for László Komár. He was called back to be part of the band in 1968, just before the band's British tour. After a few singles, he became the main songwriter of Omega's first three albums and some of those he sang himself.

After Presser left the band (1971) he played live again with his bandmates on the Omega–LGT–Beatrice tour in 1980, at the 25 year anniversary concert in 1987, and later in 1994 and 1999. He also contributed to Omega's album titled Trans and Dance as songwriter for two songs, and as guest keyboardist.

=== Locomotiv GT (1971–1984) ===
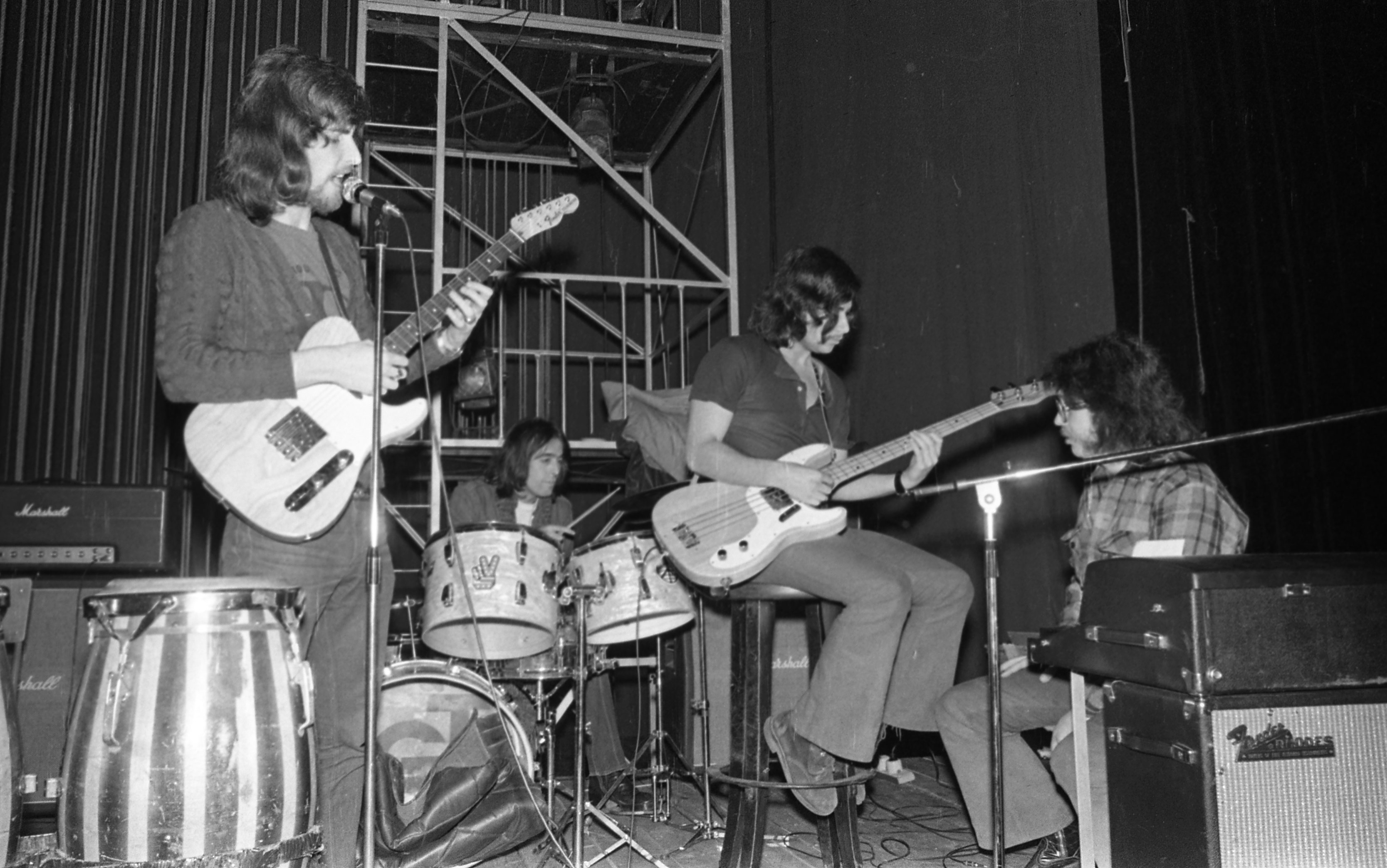
Locomotiv GT performing in 1973

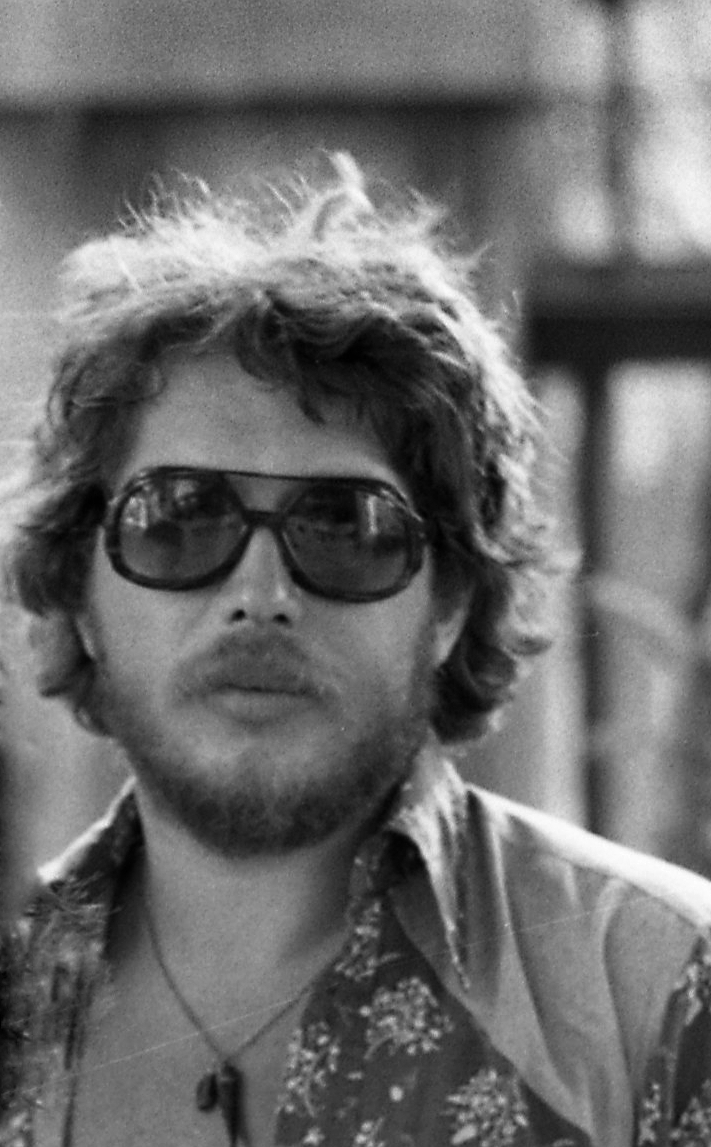
Presser in 1976

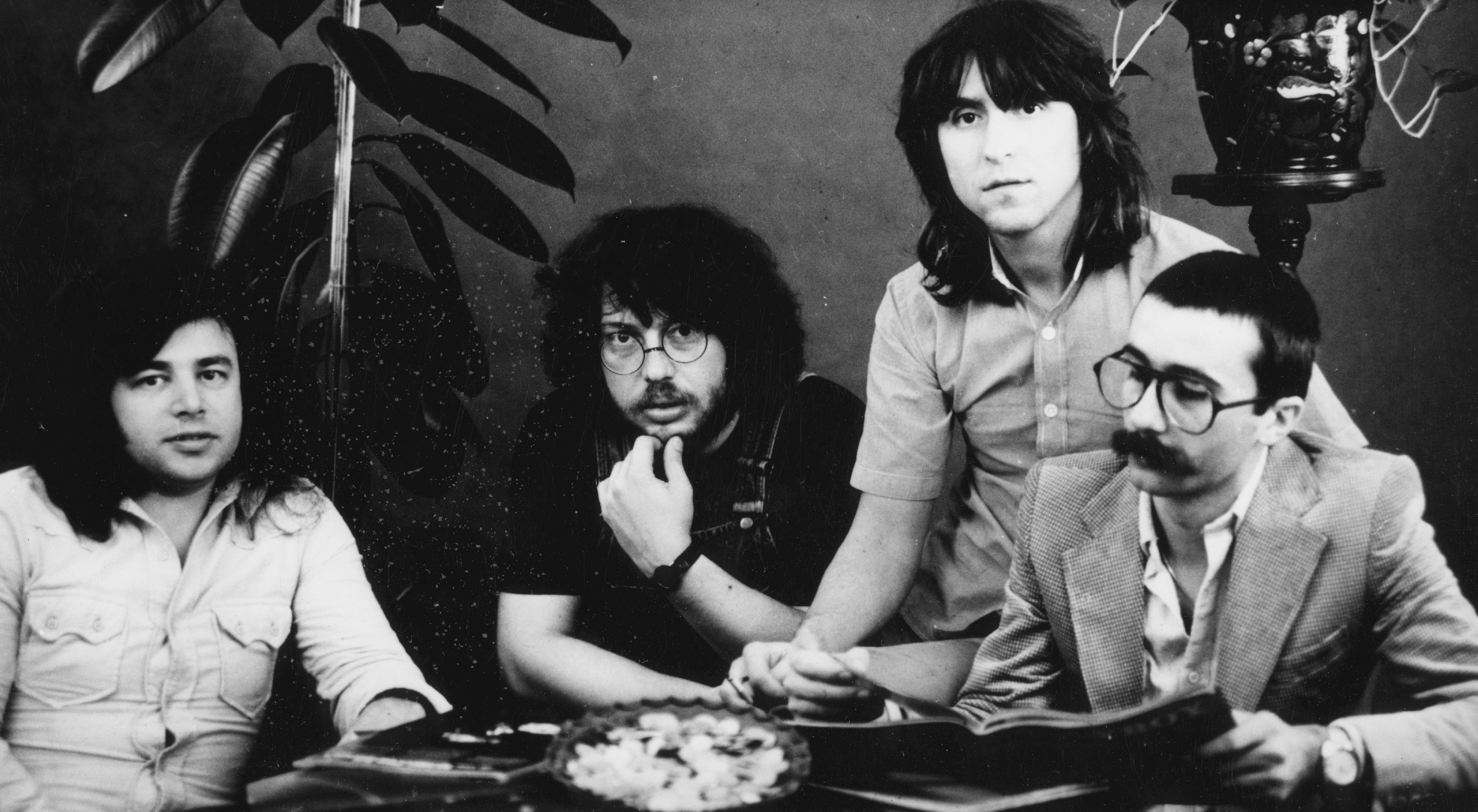
Locomotiv GT in 1983

Presser wanted more than to play Omega's music and quit the band to form Locomotiv GT with bass player Károly Frenreisz, guitarist Tamás Barta, and drummer József Laux. It was the first Hungarian so called 'supergroup'. All of the founding members, except Presser, left the group by 1977. The final line-up consisted of Presser, Tamás Somló, János Karácsony and János Solti. Presser wrote or co-wrote most of LGT's songs.

Additionally, Presser also got involved in theatre work. His first musical appeared at the Vígszínház (Comedy Theatre of Budapest) in Budapest, an adaptation of Tibor Déry's novel titled "An Imaginary Report from an American Pop Festival". Presser has written music for several theatre pieces at the Comedy Theatre of Budapest. He has been the music director of the theatre since 1978 and has his own evening shows there.

His debut solo album came out in 1982, titled Electromantic, which was originally the music for a ballet piece titled "The Rehearsal" written for electric instruments. Part of the music was used as a title song for BBC's news program. La Baletta No. 2. was used as the title piece for the Budapest Regional News.

Since the 1970s Presser has written music for and collaborated with many Hungarian artists such as Sarolta Zalatnay, Ferenc Demjén, András Kern, Gyula Vikidál, Zorán, Kati Kovács, Klári Katona, and Sándor Révész.

=== Post LGT years ===
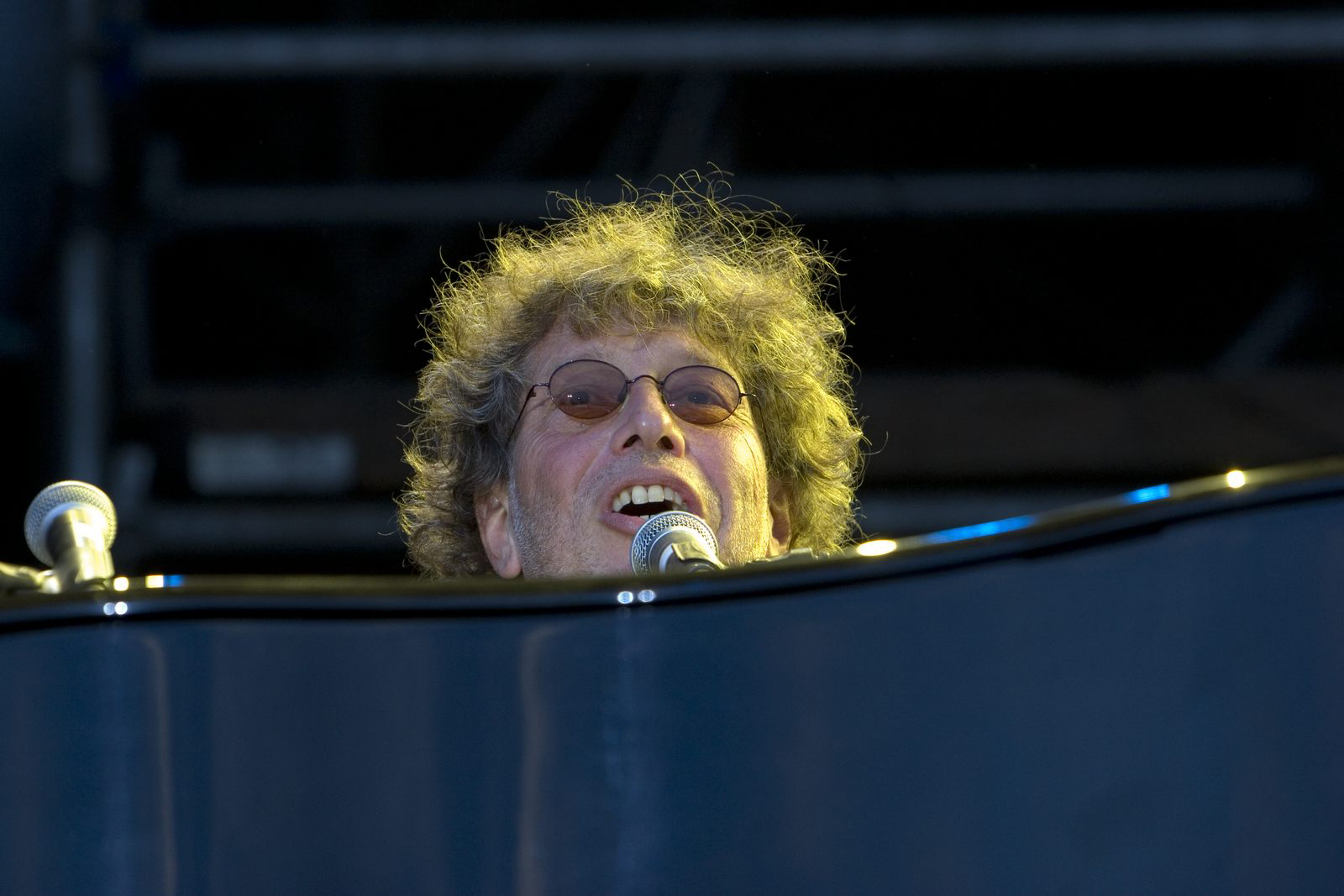
Presser performing in 2007

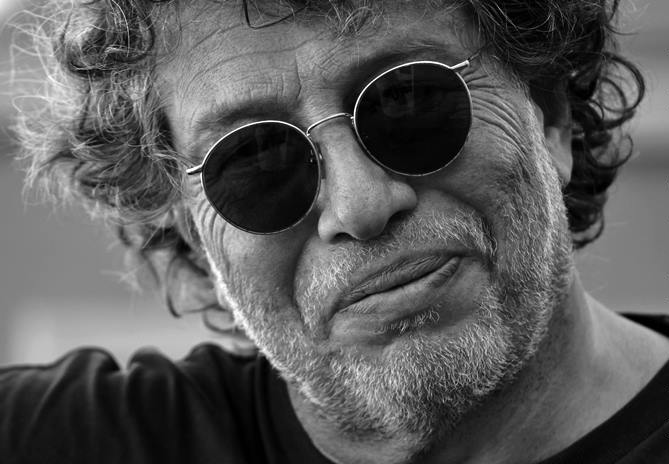
Presser in 2017

Presser started a new theatre production, which resulted in ‘A padlás’ (The Attic) in 1988. The first real Presser album was released in 1994 titled ‘Csak dalok’ (‘Only Tunes’) that was followed by Kis történetek (‘Little Stories’) in 1996.

Presser had 9 full house nights at the Comedy Theatre of Budapest in 1995. He would then stop performing live until 2001 when he did a 50 concert tour (this was recorded on CD/DVD).

After 1998 Presser has been releasing a new compilation album every couple of years.

Even though LGT dissolved in the 80s, they had a farewell concert in 1992. The recording of the farewell concert was released as an album. Later, they released two more albums with new material in 1997 and in 2002. They had a free concert in 1999, organized an LGT festival in 2002, and performed as the opening act at the Sziget Festival. They also performed a series of concerts in 2013. They released two albums after the reunion: 424 – Mozdonyopera in 1997 and A fiúk a kocsmába mentek in 2002.

In 2009, Presser himself held a concert celebrating his 40-year career with many musician guests. Some of the material from this concert is available on CD. In the two years that followed, Presser worked on a 74-minute album that was released in 2011, which consists of Lajos Parti Nagy’s poetry made into music.

In 2013, the Kanye West song "New Slaves" was nominated for a Grammy that contained about a minute long sample of Omega's 1969 song "Gyöngyhajú lány", composed by Presser. Although the sample was cleared by official label Hungaroton Records, the song was recorded without author's permission to change. In May 2016 Presser filed a lawsuit seeking $2.5 million in damages for copyright infringement for the use of the sample. West and Presser reached an out-of-court, undisclosed settlement.

== Discography ==
=== Albums ===
This is a simplified list that does not contain all the albums Presser appeared on as an artist.

Omega

- Trombitás Frédi és a rettenetes emberek (1968)
- Red Star from Hungary (1968)
- 10000 lépés (1969)
- Ten Thousand Paces kiadatlan (1970)
- Éjszakai országút (1970)
- Kisstadion ’80 (1980)
- Ezüst eső - Vizesblokk (1994)
- A változás szele - Szárazblokk (1994)
- Trans and Dance (1995)
- Transcendent (1996)
- K O N C E Rt (1999)
- Tower of Babel maxi (2004)

Locomotiv GT

- Locomotiv GT (1971)
- Ringasd el magad (1972)
- Bummm! (1973)
- Locomotiv GT (1974) aka London 1973 (2001)
- All Aboard kiadatlan (1975)
- Mindig magasabbra (1975)
- In Warsaw (1975)
- Locomotiv GT V. (1976)
- Locomotiv GT (1976) aka Motor City Rock (1978)
- Zene – Mindenki másképp csinálja (1977)
- Mindenki (1978)
- Annyi mindent nem szerettem dupla kislemez EP (1979)
- Todos (1980)
- Locomotiv GT aka Budapest (1980)
- Kisstadion ’80 (1980)
- Loksi (1980)
- Locomotiv GT X. (1982)
- Too Long (1983)
- Azalbummm (1983)
- Első magyar óriás kislemez maxi (1984)
- Ellenfél nélkül (1984)
- Boxing kiadatlan (1985)
- '74 USA - New Yorktól Los Angelesig (1988)
- Zörr (1992)
- A Locomotiv GT összes kislemeze (1992)
- Búcsúkoncert (1992)
- 424 – Mozdonyopera (1997)
- A fiúk a kocsmába mentek (2002)
- Sziget 2007 maxi (2007)

Solo Albums

- Electromantic (1982)
- Electromantic – Extra változat 1982, 1987–1989 (1993)
- Csak dalok (1994)
- Kis történetek (1996)
- Angyalok és emberek (2000)
- Dalok régről és nemrégről – Koncert 2001 (2003)
- T12enkettő (2006)
- 1 óra az 1 koncertből (2009)
- Rutinglitang (Egy zenemasiniszta); Parti Nagy Lajos Poetry (2011)
- 13 dalunk (with Marian Falusi) (2017)

Theatre Pieces

- Képzelt riport egy amerikai popfesztiválról (1973, musical)
- Harmincéves vagyok (1975, musical)
- Jó estét nyár, jó estét szerelem (1977, musical)
- A sanda bohóc (1981, musical)
- A padlás (1988, musical)
- Szent István körút 14. (1998, musical)
- Túl a Maszat-hegyen (2005, bábmusical)
- Magyar Carmen (2007, táncdráma)

Compilation Albums

- A zeneszerző – Presser Gábor (talán) legszebb dalai (1998)
- A zeneszerző 2. – Presser Gábor talán leghangosabb dalai (2001)
- A zeneszerző 3. – Szerelmes dalok (2002)
- Presser zenés színháza (2002)
- A zeneszerző 4. – Presser Gábor legszínházibb dalai (2004)
- Dalok a színházból (2005)
- A zeneszerző 5. – A szövegíró (2007)

Albums for Other Artists
Kati Kovács

- Kovács Kati és a Locomotiv GT (1974)
- Közel a Naphoz (1976)
- Rock and roller – válogatás (1976)
- Kati – néhány dal (1976, NDK)

Klári Katona

- Titkaim (1981)
- Katona Klári (1984)
- Éjszakai üzenet (1986)
- Mozi (1989)

Ibolya Oláh

- Voltam Ibojka (2018)

Zorán Sztevanovity

- Zorán (1977)
- Zorán II (1978)
- Zorán III (1979)
- Tizenegy dal (1982)
- Szép holnap (1987)
- Az élet dolgai (1991)
- Majd egyszer (1995)
- 1997 (1997)
- Az ablak mellett (1999)
- Így alakult (2001)
- Közös szavakból (2006)
- Körtánc-Kóló (2011)

Sarolta Zalatnay

- Álmodj velem (1972)

== Prizes ==
- Pop-Match – Songwriter of the Year (1976)
- Erkel Award (1977)
- Pop-Meccs – Songwriter of the Year (1977)
- Pop-Meccs – Keyboardist of the Year (1978)
- Pop-Meccs – Keyboardist of the Year (1980)
- eMeRTon Award (1986, 1990, 1994, 2000)
- Merit Award (1990)
- Order of Merit of the Republic of Hungary (1994)
- Huszka Jenő Award (1995)
- Golden Giraffe Life Accomplishment Award (1998)
- Huszka Jenő Life Accomplishment Award (1999)
- Kossuth Prize (2003)
- Prima Primissima Award (2004)
- Gundel Artist Award (2004)
- Pro Urbe Budapest Award (2009)
- Artisjus Award – The Best Pop Music Production of the Year (2009)
- Radnóti Miklós Anti-Racism Award (2011)
- Story Five Star Award (together with the other LGT members) - The Best Music Production of the Year (2014)
- Human Voice Life Accomplishment Award (2018)
