= Bummm! =

Studio album by Locomotiv GT
- Released: 1973
- Recorded: Budapest, July 1973
- Studio: Magyar Rádió
- Genre: Rock; blues rock
- Length: 37:05
- Label: Pepita

Locomotiv GT chronology
Ringasd el magad (1972)	Bummm! (1973)	Mindig magasabbra (1975)

Bummm! is Hungarian rock supergroup Locomotiv GT's third studio album and was released in 1973. It was their first album with singer and bassist Tamás Somló and their last album with guitarist Tamás Barta before he left the band. Because Somló was only learning the bass guitar when he joined the band, most of the bass on the album was recorded by Barta. The album was recorded and released in 1973. Not long after its release, the album was banned due to Barta's immigration to the United States, which was illegal at the time. The album was re-released in 1982 but without its original cover.

== Track listing ==
1. "Ringasd el magad" (Gábor Presser, Anna Adamis) - 4:59
2. "Kék asszony" (Presser, Adamis) - 3:37
3. "Gyere, gyere ki a hegyoldalba" (Tamás Barta, Presser) - 2:48
4. "Visszamegyek a falumba" (Barta, Presser) - 4:03
5. "Bárzene" (Barta) - 4:12
6. "Ö még csak tizennégy" (Barta, Adamis) - 3:55
7. "Szabadits meg" (Barta, Adamis) - 3:43
8. "Vallomás" (Barta, Adamis) - 4:00
9. "Mondd, mire van?" (Presser, Adamis) - 2:42
10. "Miénk itt a tér" (Presser, Adamis) - 2:53

== Personnel ==
- Gábor Presser - organ, piano, lead vocals (tracks 2, 3, 4, 9, 10), backing vocals
- Tamás Barta - acoustic, electric and slide guitars, bass, harmonica, lead vocals (tracks 6, 7, 8), backing vocals
- Tamás Somló - bass, alto saxophone, lead vocals (tracks 1, 9), backing vocals
- József Laux - drums, percussion
