= Károly Frenreisz =

Hungarian rock vocalist, musician, and songwriter

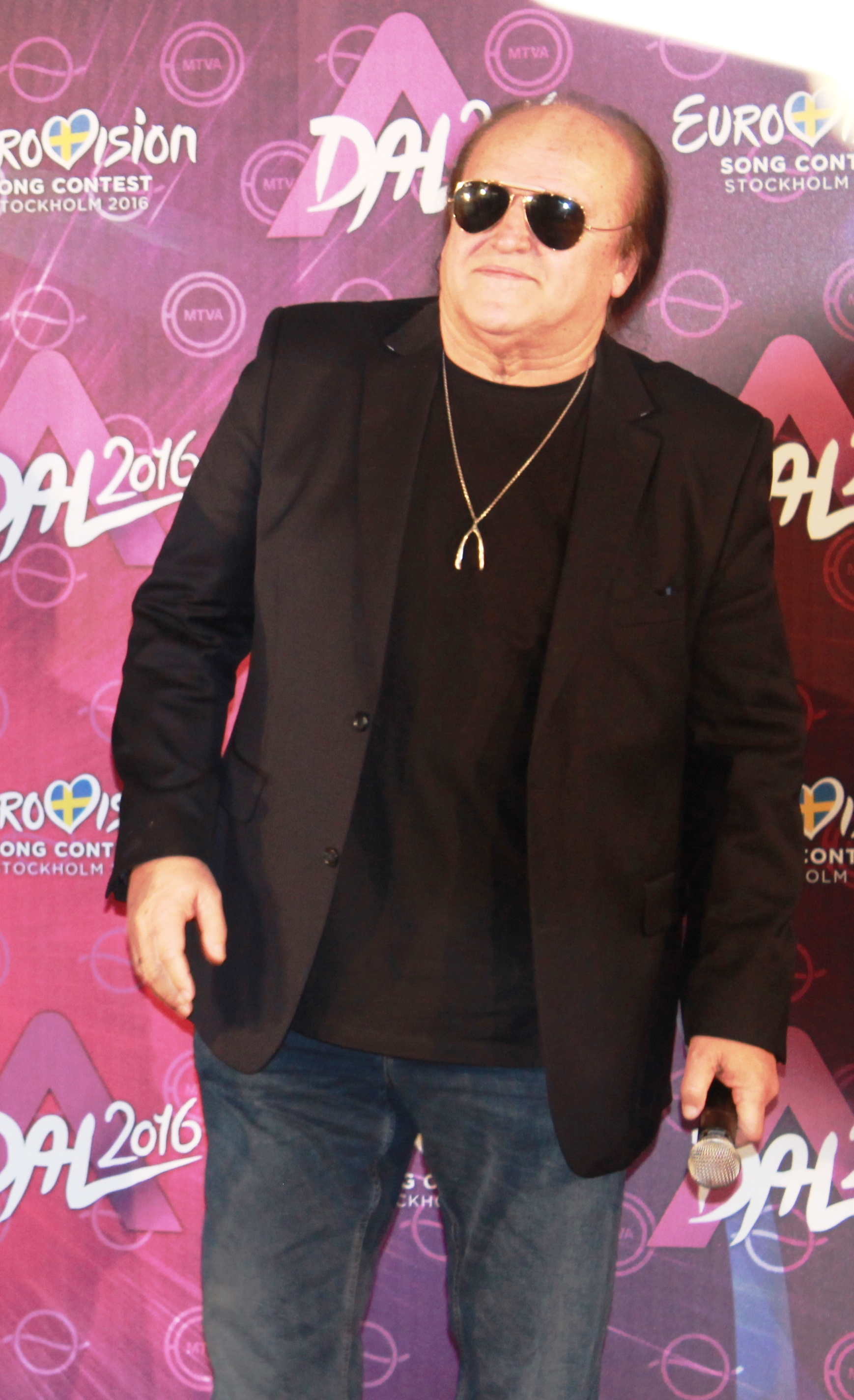
Károly Frenreisz in 2015

Károly Frenreisz (born 8 November 1946, Budapest, Hungary) is a Hungarian rock singer and songwriter.

== Life ==
Frenreisz first studied piano and then learned to play the clarinet, saxophone, and bass. He was from 1965 to 1971 part of the band Metró. The most famous song he wrote while in the band was Citromízű banán. He played a significant role in getting Metró through the end of the sixties and being part of the era of modern experimental trends in music. In 1971, he was a founding member of the band Locomotiv GT, where he was the bassist, brass player, and lead singer. He wrote the band's first hits (Boldog vagyok, Érints meg), and was connected to the band's first international success. In January 1973 he left Locomotiv GT, and later he founded the band Skorpió. The band carried over Locomotiv GT's progressive sound for their first album "A rohanás" (1974), but soon after they switched to a more radio-friendly hard rock sound. They had many hit songs, such as "Így szólt hozzám a dédapám" (from "A rohanás") and later, "Azt beszéli már az egész város" (1985). He was the frontman and the leader of the band. The band is still active with some interruptions. He was the double-bass player of the Year in 1974 and 1981. His half brother was actor Zoltán Latinovits (1931–1976) and his brother was actor István Bujtor (1942–2009). His maternal grandfather was restaurateur Károly Gundel (founder of Gundel restaurant in Budapest), and Gundel's father was János Gundel.

He was a judge on the 2016 edition of A Dal, the Hungarian national selection for the Eurovision Song Contest 2016, and he was also part of the Hungarian national jury for the jury voting. He was again a judge on A Dal for the 2017 edition and was so again for the 2018 edition.

== Personal life ==
He is married in his second marriage. From his previous relationship he has a daughter, Zsófia, and a son, Zoltán.

== Recognitions ==
- Budapest díszpolgára (2012)
- A Magyar Érdemrend tisztikeresztje (2015)
- Kossuth Prize (2017)

== Discography ==
=== Metro ===
- Metro (1969)
- Egy este a Metro Klubban… (1970)
- Metro koncert (1992)
- A Metro együttes összes felvétele (1992, compilation)
- Gyémánt és arany (2000, compilation of non-album singles and rarities)

=== Locomotiv GT ===
- Locomotiv GT (1971)
- Ringasd el magad (1972)
- Búcsúkoncert (1992) – the band's 1992 farewell concert; his contributions can be heard on the song "Ő még csak 14".

=== Skorpió ===
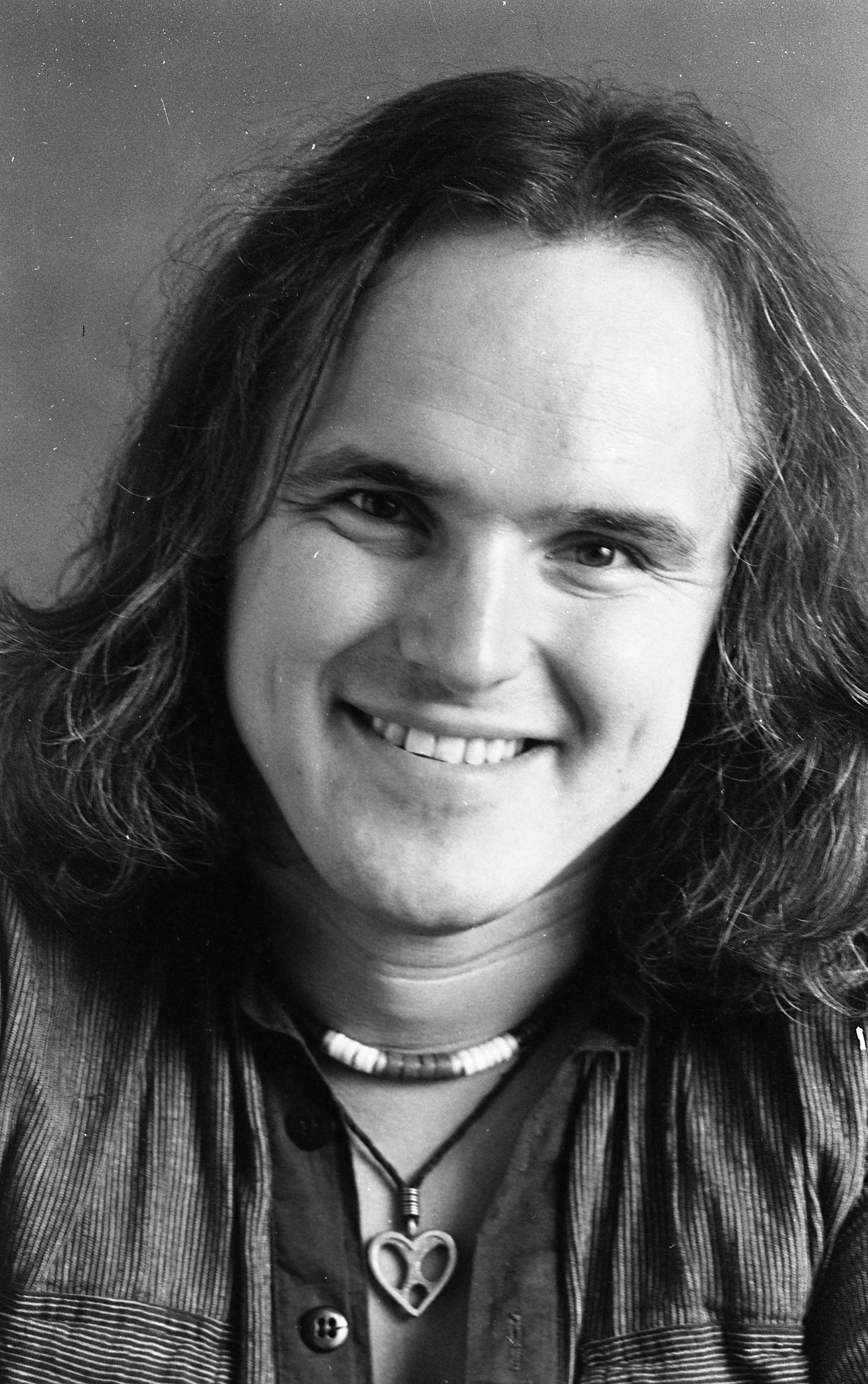
Károly Freinreisz (1978)

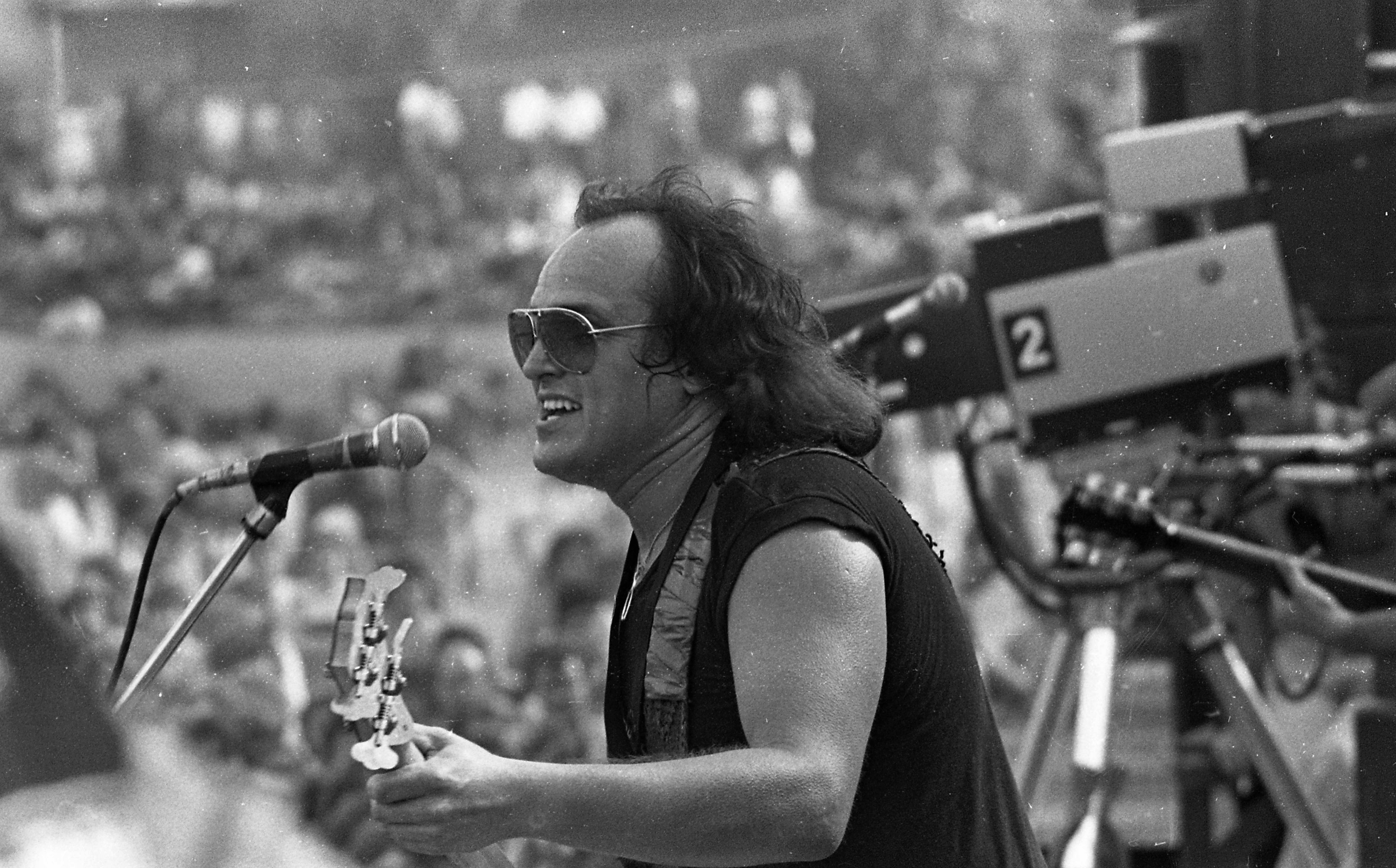
People's Garden Court, Jubilee Rock Festival, Károly Frenreisz, Scorpio joint (1983)

- A rohanás (1974)
- Ünnepnap (1976)
- Kelj fel! (1977)
- Gyere velem! (1978)
- The Run (Swedish release in English, 1978)
- Új! Skorpió (1980)
- Zene tíz húrra és egy dobosra (1981)
- Aranyalbum 1973–1983 (1983)
- Azt beszéli már az egész város (1985)
- A show megy tovább (1993)
- Skorpió '73-'93 Aranyalbum (1993)

== Notable bandmates ==
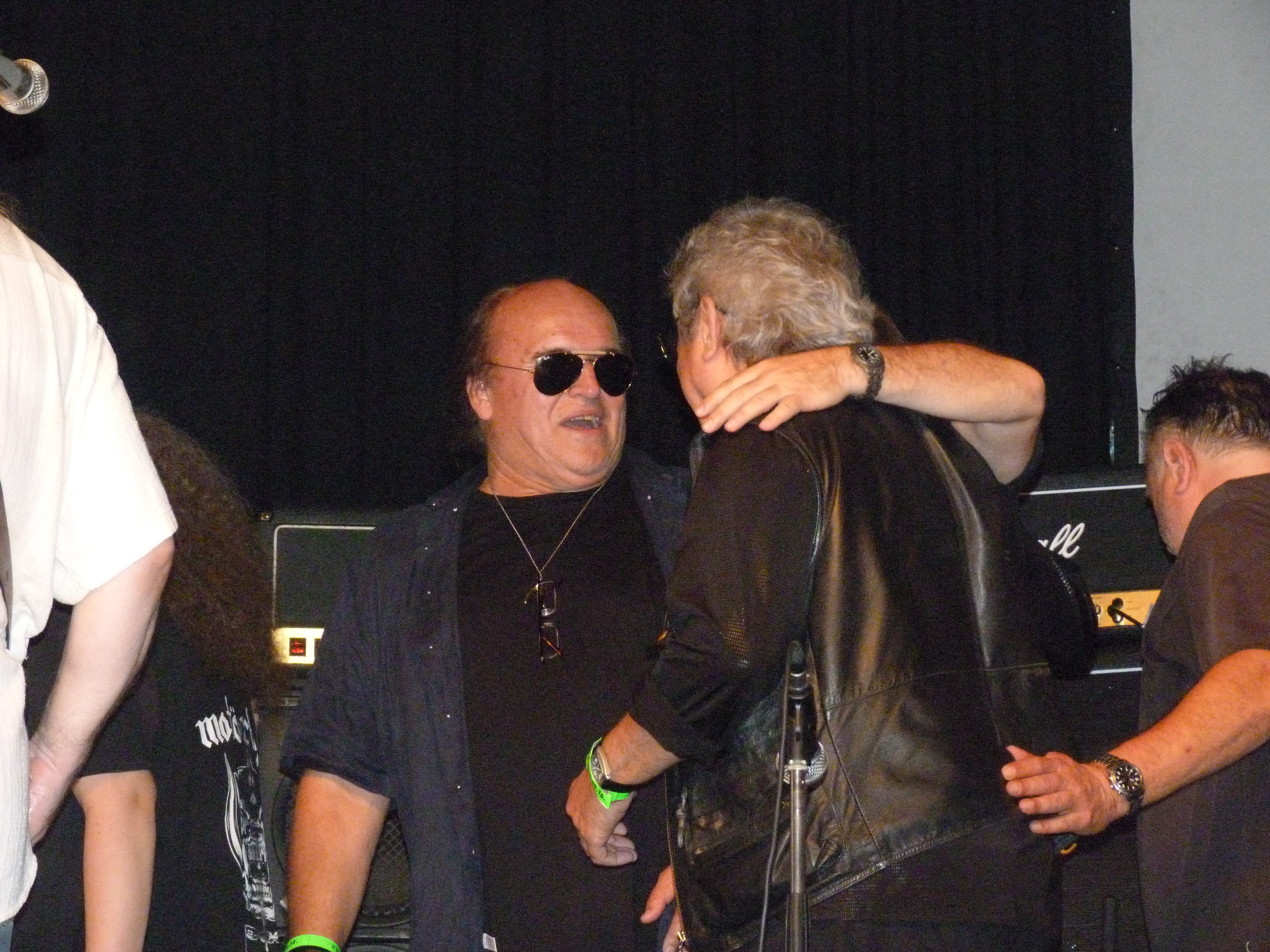
Károly Frenreisz in 2012

- Tamás Barta (Locomotiv GT)
- Győző Brunner (Metro)
- Gábor Fekete (Skorpió)
- János Fogarasi (Metro)
- József Laux (Locomotiv GT)
- Gábor Németh (Skorpió)
- Géza Pálvölgyi (Skorpió)
- Gyula Papp (Skorpió)
- Tamás Papp (/Új/ Skorpió)
- Gábor Presser (Locomotiv GT)
- Ottó Schöck (Metro)
- Dusán Sztevanovity (Metro)
- Zorán Sztevanovity (Metro)
- Gábor Antal Szűcs (Skorpió)
- Tibor Tátrai (Új Skorpió)

== Film roles ==
- Mélyrétegben (1967) Ferenc Kerpán
- A nagy generáció (1985)
- A három testőr Afrikában (1996) zenész
- Tea (tévésorozat, 2002–2003) Béla Páncél
- Magyar vándor (2004) viking

== Film music ==
- Csak semmi pánik (1982)
- Az elvarázsolt dollár (1985)
- Hamis a baba (1991)
- A három testőr Afrikában (1996)
- Zsaruvér és Csigavér I.: A királyné nyakéke (2001)
- Zsaruvér és Csigavér II.: Több tonna kámfor (2002)

== Family tree ==
Károly Frenreisz family tree
| Károly Frenreisz (born 18 November 1946, Budapest) singer | István Frenreisz (27 May 1907, Budapest – 23 October 1982, Budapest); Hospital chief medical officer | Ferenec Frenreisz (7 Feb 1873, Pest, – 5 Jul 1916, Budapest) chief medical officer, militia army regimental surgeon | István Frenreisz (approx. 1840 – Budapest, 1909. jún. 13.); Board Chairman of the Royal Courts of Appeal in Budapest |
| Károly Frenreisz (born 18 November 1946, Budapest) singer | István Frenreisz (27 May 1907, Budapest – 23 October 1982, Budapest); Hospital chief medical officer | Ferenec Frenreisz (7 Feb 1873, Pest, – 5 Jul 1916, Budapest) chief medical officer, militia army regimental surgeon | Etelka Anna Bujtor (12 Jul 1846, Budapest – 11 Nov 1923 Budapest) |
| Károly Frenreisz (born 18 November 1946, Budapest) singer | István Frenreisz (27 May 1907, Budapest – 23 October 1982, Budapest); Hospital chief medical officer | Lujza Virava (31 Jul 1880, Budapest – ?) | József Virava (1836– 10 Jan 1914, Budapest) lawyer, member of parliament |
| Károly Frenreisz (born 18 November 1946, Budapest) singer | István Frenreisz (27 May 1907, Budapest – 23 October 1982, Budapest); Hospital chief medical officer | Lujza Virava (31 Jul 1880, Budapest – ?) | Zsófia Simon |
| Károly Frenreisz (born 18 November 1946, Budapest) singer | Katalin Gundel (2 May 1910, Budapest – June 2010, Balatonszemes) | Károly Gundel (23 Sep 1883, Budapest – 28 Nov 1956, Budapest); Restaurateur | János Gundel (3 Mar 1844, Ansbach – 28 Dec 1915, Budapest); Restaurateur |
| Károly Frenreisz (born 18 November 1946, Budapest) singer | Katalin Gundel (2 May 1910, Budapest – June 2010, Balatonszemes) | Károly Gundel (23 Sep 1883, Budapest – 28 Nov 1956, Budapest); Restaurateur | Anna Kommer (24 Dec 1851, Pest-Buda, – 12 Dec 1920, Budapest) |
| Károly Frenreisz (born 18 November 1946, Budapest) singer | Katalin Gundel (2 May 1910, Budapest – June 2010, Balatonszemes) | Margit Blasutigh (30 May 1885, Veszprém – 5 Jul 1961, Budapest) | Mátyás Blasutigh (1840, San Pietro al Natisone – Budapest, ?) trader |
| Károly Frenreisz (born 18 November 1946, Budapest) singer | Katalin Gundel (2 May 1910, Budapest – June 2010, Balatonszemes) | Margit Blasutigh (30 May 1885, Veszprém – 5 Jul 1961, Budapest) | Illona Gerlits (1851, Veszprém – 1919, Gölle) |
