= Mindig magasabbra =

Studio album by Locomotiv GT
- Released: 1975
- Recorded: 1975
- Studio: Mafilm, MHV, Budapest
- Genre: Rock
- Length: 42:26
- Label: Pepita
- Producer: Attila Apró

Locomotiv GT chronology
Bummm! (1973)	Mindig magasabbra (1975)	Locomotiv GT V. (1976)

Mindig Magasabbra is the fourth studio album by Hungarian rock supergroup Locomotiv GT, released in 1975. It was their first album with János Karácsony.

== Track listing ==
1. "Intuitio molto furtivamente" - 3:58
  1. "Andante" (Presser)
  2. "Vivace kalapaccio" (Laux)
  3. "Allegro, allegro" (Presser)
2. "Szólj rám, ha hangosan énekelek" - 4:40 (Presser, Anna Adamis)
3. "Arra mennék én" - 3:20 (Presser)
4. "Mindig magasabbra" - 3:54 (Presser, Laux)
5. "És jött a doktor" - 4:28 (Presser)
6. "Neked írom a dalt" - 5:20 (Presser)
7. "Álomarcú lány" - 4:47 (Somló, Adamis)
8. "Nekem ne mondja senki" - 3:57 (Somló, Adamis)
9. "Egy elfelejtett szó" - 4:05 (Presser, Adamis)
10. "Ülök a járdán" - 3:46 (Somló, Adamis)

== Personnel ==
- Gábor Presser — vocals, organ, piano
- János Karácsony — guitars, vocals
- Tamás Somló — bass, alto saxophone, harp, vocals
- József Laux — drums, percussion
