= Károly Gundel =

- Born: 23 September 1883; Budapest, Austro-Hungarian Empire
- Died: 28 November 1956 (aged 73); Budapest, Hungary
- Occupation(s): Restaurateur owner of Gundel Restaurant
- Spouse: Margit Blassutigh
- Children: Károly; Margit; Katalin Paulina; Pál; Endre; Ferenc József; Erzsébet; Anna; Mária; Pálma; József; István; Imre
- Parent(s): Johannes Gundel; Anne Katharina Evelin Kommer
- Relatives: Károly Frenreisz (grandchild); István Bujtor (grandchild); Zoltán Latinovits (grandchild)

Károly Gundel (Hungarian: [ˈkaːroj ˈɡundɛl]; 23 September 1883 – 28 November 1956) was a Hungarian restaurateur, business magnate, philanthropist, writer of culinary works and the former owner of the Gundel Restaurant.

== Family ==
Károly Gundel was born on 23 September 1883 in Budapest, the son of Johann Gundel, a Bavarian-born German restaurateur who emigrated to Hungary in 1857. His mother was Anna Kommer. Of the 5 children of János Gundel it was Károly who inherited his father's passion for the catering profession and his gastronomic genius. He married in 1907 with Margit Blasutigh. They had 13 children together.

His grandchildren were Zoltán Latinovits, István Bujtor and Károly Frenreisz.

== Life ==
After the trade school, he learned the craft in famous restaurants in Switzerland, Germany, England and France from 1900. He was secretary in the Tátralomnic's hotel between 1906 and 1908. In 1908 he became the director. He bought the Wampetich restaurant in 1910. (Later it became the Gundel restaurant). From 1937 Károly Gundel managed the restaurant of the Hotel Gellért as well. Many well-known politicians, artists, and prime exponents of business life were regular guests in his restaurants. His cookbooks were the best and best-known books in Hungarian gastronomy. He wrote in foreign languages, gave cooking demonstrations and exhibitions, and popularized Hungarian cuisine, boosting tourism. He was also one of the leaders of the Hungarian restaurateur, hoteliers and industry. To host, to be a guest, a book by Frigyes Karinthy (Budapest, 1933) was made with his advice.

== Gundel restaurant ==
Károly Gundel's restaurant was the official restaurant of the Hungarian Pavilion in the New York World's Fair in 1939. 'The Gundel Restaurant is a bigger, better publicity from Budapest than a boatload of tourist brochures." (New York Times) In 1949, the Gundel restaurant was nationalized. The Gundel Restaurant is today the most prestigious restaurant in Budapest.

== Cuisine ==
One of Gundel's signature dishes is the Gundel palacsinta, a crepe with a filling made from rum, raisin, walnuts, and lemon zest, served with a chocolate sauce. Gundel also claims to have created Palóc soup, a soup that aimed to be "like goulash . . . yet not goulash," according to the Gundel web site.
