= Locomotiv GT V. =

Studio album by Locomotiv GT
- Released: 1976
- Recorded: 1976
- Genre: Rock
- Length: 82:07 (1976) 74:32 (1992 CD reissue)
- Label: Pepita

Locomotiv GT chronology
Mindig magasabbra (1975)	Locomotiv GT V. (1976)	Zene – Mindenki másképp csinálja (1977)

Locomotiv GT V. is the fifth studio album by Hungarian rock supergroup Locomotiv GT. It is the band's first double album, which was released in 1976 and was the last LGT album with drummer József Laux and the last featuring lyricist Anna Adamis. The album was banned due to Laux' immigration to the United States, which was illegal at the time.

== Track listing ==
=== Side one ===
1. "Csak az jöjjön" (Gábor Presser, József Laux) - 0:30
2. "A kicsi, a nagy, az Artúr és az Indián" (Presser, Anna Adamis) - 4:38
3. "Rajongás" (János Karácsony, Adamis) - 4:56
4. "Valamit mindig valamiért" (Tamás Somló, Adamis) - 7:41

=== Side two ===
1. "Mindenki" (Presser) - 5:53
2. "Ahogy mindenki" (Presser) - 3:31
3. "Rohanj hozzám" (Karácsony, Adamis) - 4:27
4. "Tiltott gyümölcs" (Somló, Adamis) - 5:05

=== Side three ===
1. "Fiú" (Presser) - 3:39
2. "Ha a csend beszélni tudna" (Somló, Adamis) - 3:20
3. "Senki gyermekei" (Presser, Adamis) - 6.38
4. "Szelíd erőszak" (Somló, Adamis) - 2:19
5. "Ikarus 254" (Laux) - 6:30

=== Side four ===
(Live Performance)

1. "Arra mennék én" (Presser) - 0:41
2. "És jött a doktor" (Presser) - 1:07
3. "Segíts elaludni!" (Presser, Adamis) - 1:41
4. "Ülök a járdán" (Somló, Adamis) - 2:02
5. "Az eső és én" (Somló, Adamis) - 5:28
6. "Várlak" (Presser) - 2:58
7. "Ezüst nyár" (Presser, Adamis) - 3:29
8. "Álomarcú lány" (Somló, Adamis) - 1:57
9. "Neked írom a dalt" (Presser) - 2:15

For the 1992 CD reissue, the album was fit onto one disc, but due to the format's length restrictions, the song "Ikarus 254" was not included.

== Personnel ==
- Gábor Presser - piano, clavinet, blues-harp, percussion, vocals
- Tamás Somló - bass guitar, alto saxophone, harmonica, acoustic guitar, vocals
- János Karácsony - electric guitar, acoustic guitar, bass guitar, vocals
- József Laux - drums, percussion
- Anna Adamis - lyrics
- László Dely - percussion (conga, bongo, talking drum, maracas, guayo, afuche, agogo, cow bells, daves, tortuga, triangulum)
- István Dely - percussion
- Endre Sipos - trumpet
- Károly Neumayer - trumpet
- László Dés - tenor saxophone
- István Gábor - tenor saxophone
- István Bergendy - baritone saxophone
- Károly Friedrich - trombone
- László Gőz - trombone
- Júlia Postásy - vocal
- Éva Várszegi - vocal
- Anthimos Apostolis - guitar

=== Production ===
- Attila Apró - Music director
- György Kovács - Sound engineer
- László Nagyváry - Graphics
