= Locomotiv GT (album) =

Studio album by Locomotiv GT
- Released: 10 December 1971
- Recorded: Budapest, 1971
- Genres: Rock, blues rock
- Length: 42:40
- Labels: MHV (Hungary); Qualiton (Argentina); Capitol (U.S. English version)

Locomotiv GT chronology
Locomotiv GT (1971)	Ringasd el magad (1972)

Locomotiv GT is the self-titled debut studio album of Hungarian rock supergroup Locomotiv GT, released in December 1971. Compared to other Hungarian music albums of the time, the sound of Locomotiv GT was heavier (most reminiscent of Éjszakai országút, released by Omega in 1970), and with the exception of "Ezüst nyár", the album lacked so-called hits. That was the result of a conscious decision made by the group; they intended to play high-quality rock music reminiscent of contemporary English and American groups. Unlike albums released by LGT in the second half of the 1970s, the instrumentation of Locomotiv GT is somewhat simple, the saxophone being the only "exotic" instrument. The music is built around the virtuoso guitar playing of Barta, and the masterful organ playing of Presser; in addition, Frenreisz plays his bass more powerfully than most of his Hungarian peers, and the drumming of Laux is also worth to mention. The style of the songs does not really fit in with the typical Hungarian pop music of the time; that is, it is more mature, although it cannot be called progressive rock in its traditional sense. Improvisation, showing the skills of the musicians, was employed more frequently in songs, such as "A Napba öltözött lány", "A tengelykezű félember", and "Hej, én szólok hozzád". The influence of American blues rock (in "Nem nekem való" and "Royal blues") and jazz (in the somewhat parodic "Sose mondd a mamának") are also evident. Locomotiv GT recorded the album before they played any live concerts together. Gábor Presser later stated that the album was a getting to know each other affair, and that LGT became a real band only by the time they recorded their following album, Ringasd el magad. The lyrics were written by Anna Adamis (the wife of Laux at the time), who provided the lyrics to most Omega songs between 1968 and 1970.

Though not a huge success because of its experimental style, Locomotiv GT proved to be a promising debut; their second release, Ringasd el magad, gained more popularity. In 1973 Locomotiv GT was issued in Argentina by Qualiton (not to be confused with the Hungarian label) in the form of a license album. Its cover art was different from the original Hungarian version, but the content was the same.

== Track listing ==
=== Side one ===
1. "Egy dal azokért, akik nincsenek itt" (Gábor Presser, Anna Adamis) – 5:04
2. "A Napba öltözött lány" (Károly Frenreisz, Adamis) – 4:54
3. "A kötéltáncos álma" (Tamás Barta, Adamis) – 3:33
4. "A tengelykezű félember" (Presser, Adamis) – 4:24
5. "Hej, én szólok hozzád" (Presser, Adamis) – 5:45

=== Side two ===
1. "Ezüst nyár" (Presser, Adamis) – 3:03
2. "Ordító arcok" (Barta, Adamis) – 4:17
3. "Sose mondd a mamának" (Frenreisz, Adamis) – 3:49
4. "Nem nekem való" (Frenreisz, Adamis) – 4:41
5. "Royal blues (Gipszeld be a kezed)" (Barta, Adamis) – 3:06

== Personnel ==
- Tamás Barta – guitars
- Károly Frenreisz – vocals, Fender bass, soprano saxophone, tenor saxophone, flute, guitar
- József Laux – drums, percussion
- Gábor Presser – vocals, organ, piano, vibraphone
- Anna Adamis – lyrics

=== Production ===
- Attila Fülöp – engineer
- Dóra Antal – executive producer
- Tamás Féner – photos
- Miklós Mester – cover art

== Release history ==
Region	Date	Label	Format	Catalog	Notes
Hungary	1971	MHV Pepita	stereo LP	SLPX 17435	
Argentina	1973	Qualiton	stereo LP	SQH-2037	Licensed album issued in Argentina.
United States	1974	Qualiton	stereo LP	ABCX-811	Licensed album issued in the United States of America.
Hungary	1991	Hungaroton Mega	stereo LP	SLPM 37528 (91/M-003)	Part of A Locomotiv GT összes nagylemeze box set
Hungary	1992	Hungaroton-Gong	CD	HCD 37528 (92/M-003)	Part of A Locomotiv GT összes nagylemeze box set
