= Sarolta Zalatnay =

Hungarian singer (born 1947)

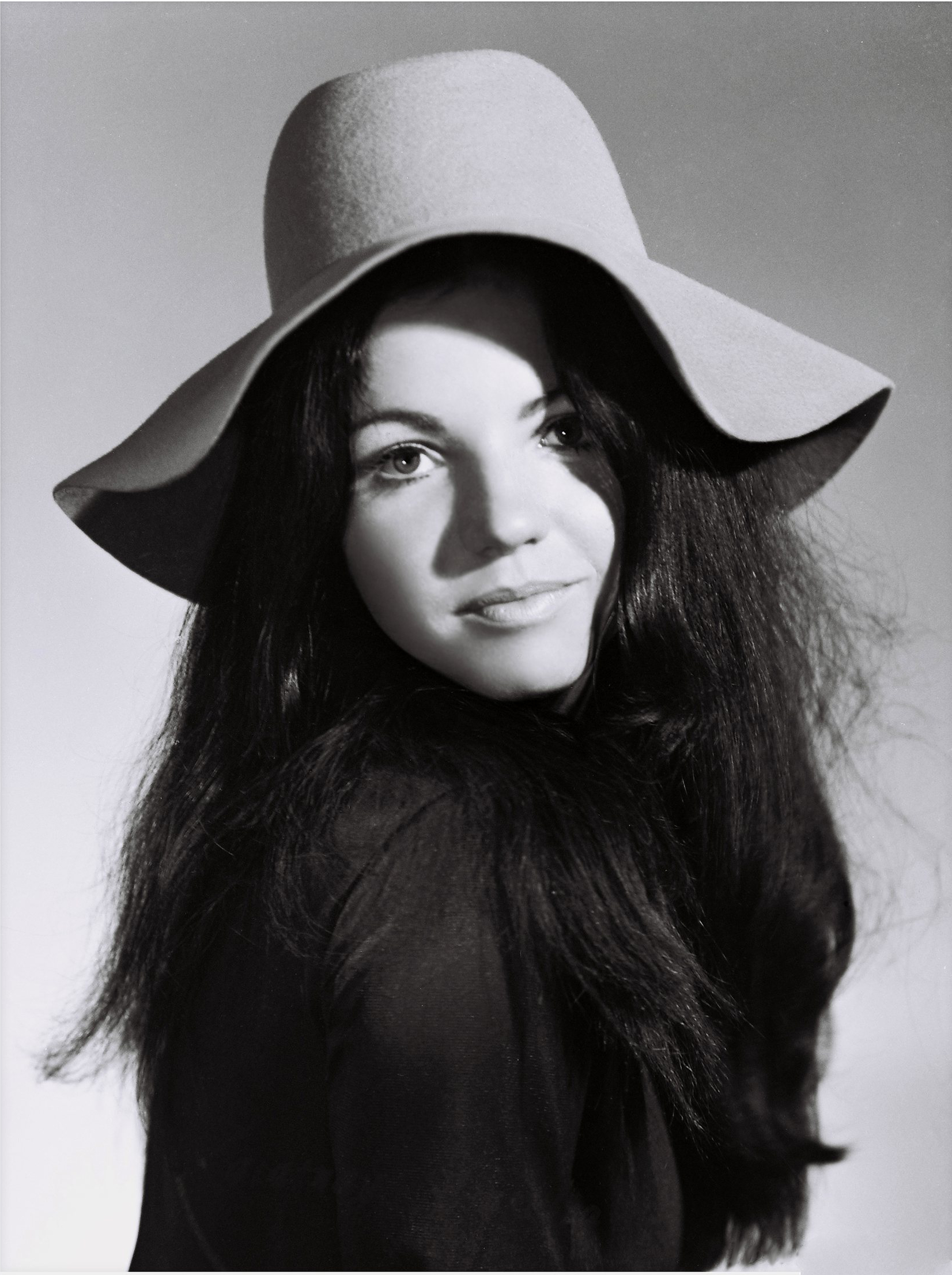

Background information
- Born: Charlotte Sacher; 14 December 1947 (age 78); Budapest, Hungary
- Origin: Hungary
- Genres: Rock, blues-rock, hard rock, pop rock, beat
- Occupation: Singer
- Years active: 1963–present

Sarolta Zalatnay (born Charlotte Sacher in Budapest, Hungary, 14 December 1947) is a Hungarian singer. She has been noted for a flourishing popular music career under Communism, and evolved from teen pop to rock music.

== Career ==
Zalatnay was born with the name Charlotte Sacher; her family later adopted Hungarian naming conventions and her official name became Zalatnay Sarolta. She appeared on stage for the first time in 1963, using the nickname Cini. In 1966, at age 18, she finished in second place in the Hungarian Television song contest Táncdalfesztivál, with the song "Hol jár az eszem?" ("Where is My Mind Running?"). During this period she worked with the backing bands Bergendy Együttes and Metró. In 1967 she appeared in the contest again and finished in first place with the song "Nem várok holnapig" ("I Am Not Waiting Till Tomorrow"), on which she was accompanied by the Hungarian rock group Omega.

Thanks to the relatively lenient travel restrictions managed by the Communist-era Hungarian government, Zalatnay was able to tour England in 1968–69. While there she became acquainted with the Bee Gees, and had a brief personal relationship with Maurice Gibb. She again won the first prize in the Táncdalfesztivál contest in 1971 with "Fák, virágok, fény" ("Trees, Flowers, Light"). By this time she had moved into rock music, with a singing style that has been compared to that of Janis Joplin; Zalatnay is known to have attended a musical festival featuring Joplin during this period. Furthermore, a vocal cord operation during this period changed the tone of Zalatnay's voice, allowing her to tackle grittier rock songs. She later worked frequently with Metró member Károly Frenreisz, who assisted with songwriting and production. Frenreisz's hard rock-oriented bands Locomotiv GT and Skorpio provided backing for Zalatnay's albums in the early 1970s.

Zalatnay's first full-length album, Ha fiú lehetnék (If I Could Be a Boy), was released in 1970 and featured a cover on which Zalatnay transformed from a teen pop star to an adult rock singer. Her frequent changes of image and attitude during her rock music period have been compared to the similar strategy used later by Madonna. Her 1973 album Hadd mondjam el (Let Me Tell You) received attention from international rock critics. During her most successful musical period, she also performed small roles in several Hungarian films. Later critics and journalists speculated that Zalatnay could have achieved international stardom were it not for the Communist-era restrictions on popular music, notwithstanding the relatively lenient strictures of her native Hungary.

Zalatnay's music career slowed down in the 1980s when Hungarian fans moved on to new genres of Western music. She released the autobiography Nem vagyok én apáca (I’m No Nun) during this period. By the 1990s, she had become a post-Communist political activist in Hungary, as a board member of the Felicity Party and chairwoman of the Hungarian Animal Protection and Nature Federation.

Zalatnay's music remained relatively unknown outside of Hungary until the release of a self-titled compilation in 2007. The compilation gained the notice of Western rock critics, who were inspired to evaluate Zalatnay's place in rock and pop history. One such reviewer called Zalatnay one of the most important entertainers of her nation and era, noting that her music was impressively varied and often ahead of its time. Another reviewer stated that Zalatnay adapted typical American rock music into the Hungarian milieu, with an acid rock/blues sound and particularly powerful vocals. By this time, Zalatnay's musical career had been largely forgotten in Hungary, and her personal life and appearances on Hungarian reality TV were mostly of interest to local tabloids. The 2007 compilation revived interest in her music and she resumed live performing. In 2017, she returned to the Erkel Theatre in Budapest, the site of her early performances for Táncdalfesztivál, for a seventieth birthday concert.

== Personal life ==
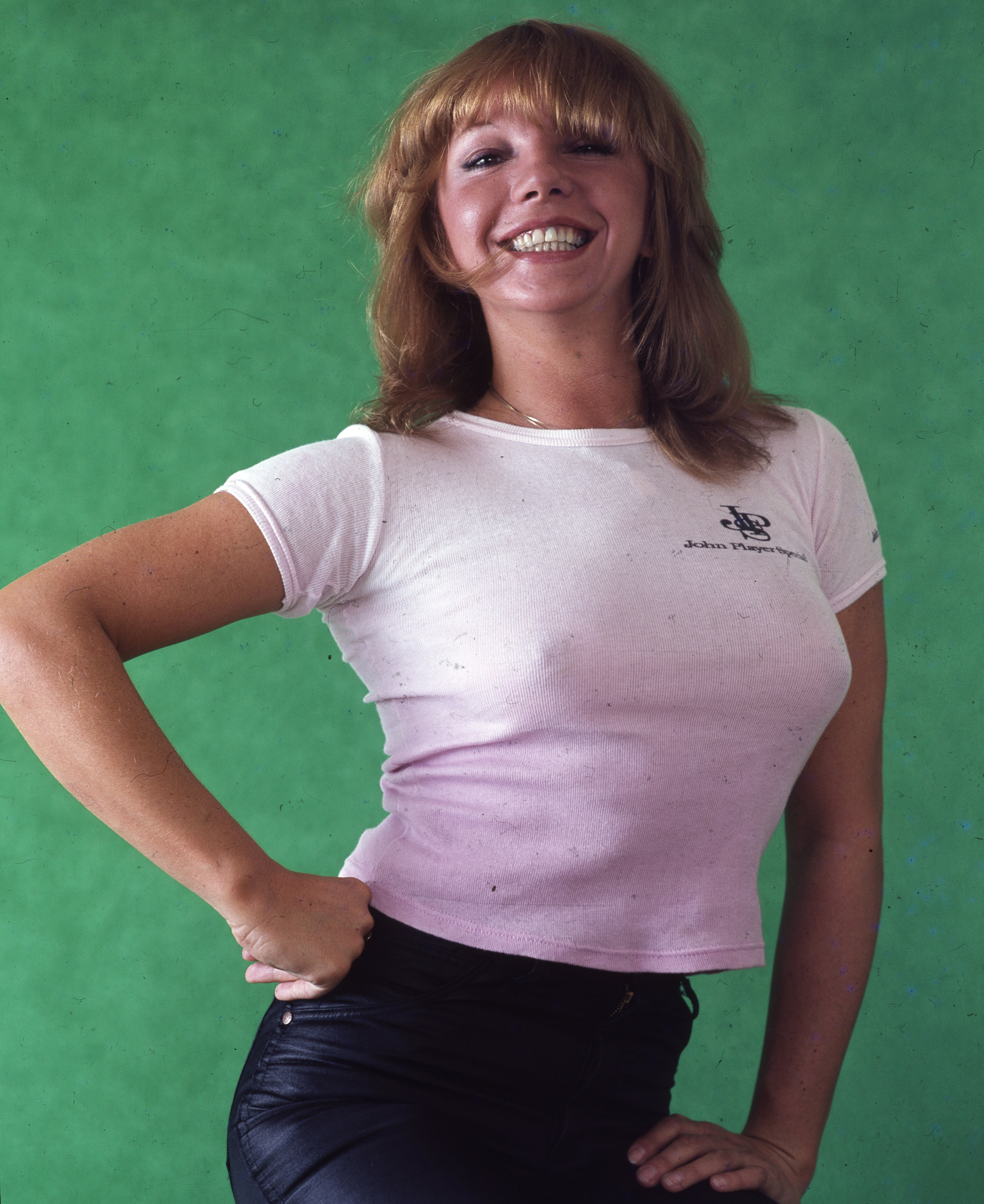
Zalatnay in 1978.

In 1968, Zalatnay had a short relationship with the English musician Maurice Gibb. In 1974 she married Sándor Révész of the Hungarian rock band Piramis but they later divorced. Her second marriage was to László Benedek in 1987, and they had a daughter in 1989. In 1995 she married for the third time, to pornography director Márton Csaba. Csaba persuaded her to pose nude in Playboy at age 53 in 2001. In 2004, she was sentenced to three years in prison for tax fraud. She served 16 months, and was released on parole in 2006.

She currently lives in Tárnok.

== Albums ==
- Ha fiú lehetnék (If I Could Be A Boy, 1970)
- Zalatnay (1971)
- Álmodj velem (Dream of Me, 1972)
- Hadd mondjam el (Let Me Tell You, 1973)
- Szeretettel (With Love, 1975)
- Színes trikó, kopott farmer (Coloured Jerseys, Shabby Jeans, 1976)
- Minden szó egy dal (Each Word Is a Song, 1978)
- Tükörkép (Mirror-Image, 1980)
- Privát levél (Private Letter, 1988)
- Ave Maria (1989)
- Sarolta Zalatnay (compilation, 2007)

== Sources ==
- Sarolta Zalatnay Official Site
- Sarolta Zalatnay
- Sarolta Zalatnay
- 59 éves Zalatnay Sarolta
