= Palóc soup =

Hungarian soup

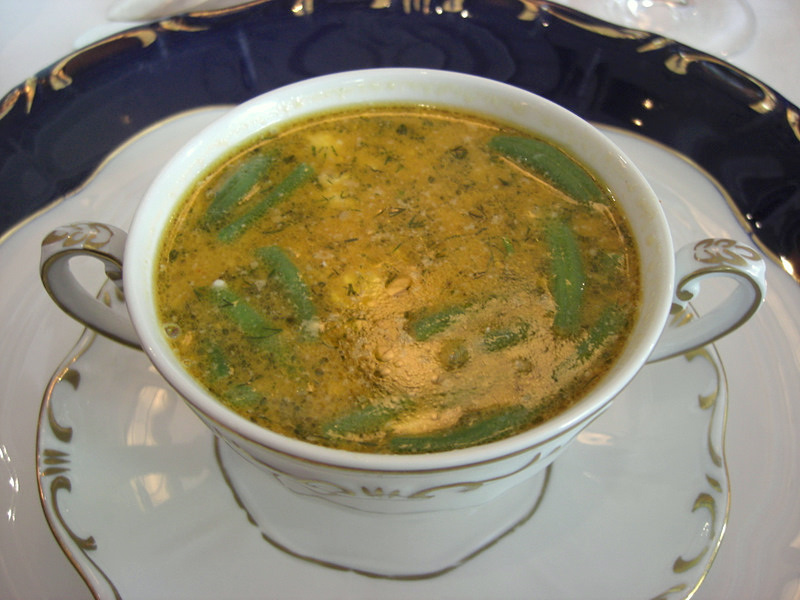
- Palóc soup at Gundel Restaurant in Budapest
- Type: Soup
- Place of origin: Hungary
- Serving temperature: hot
- Main ingredients: meat, smoked lard, potato, green beans, carrot, parsley root

Palóc soup (Hungarian: palócleves) is a soup similar to Hungarian goulash soup, but lighter and a bit sour in taste. Contrary to popular opinion, the soup was not named after the Palóc people.

== History ==
The exact history of the soup is not known, however, there are several legends surrounding its origins. The most prominent is the soup having been created by János Gundel, for a restaurant opening event, where well-known writer Kálmán Mikszáth was invited to. Gundel named the soup after Mikszáth's nickname, "the greatest of Palóc people". Elek Magyar's prominent cookbook, Az ínyesmester szakácskönyve recalls the soup being created for a food contest, where the jury liked it so much they ate two bowls of it.

== Recipes ==
Palóc soup is usually made of mutton, pork or beef, rarely from turkey. Previous recipes called for the vegetables to be cooked separately. The soup is often made by mixing sour cream, but can be served with sour cream in a separate bowl. Newer recipes use vinegar or lemon to give the soup a sourish taste and some dill can also be used as decoration.

== See also ==
- List of soups
- Hungarian cuisine
