= Locomotiv GT =

Hungarian rock supergroup

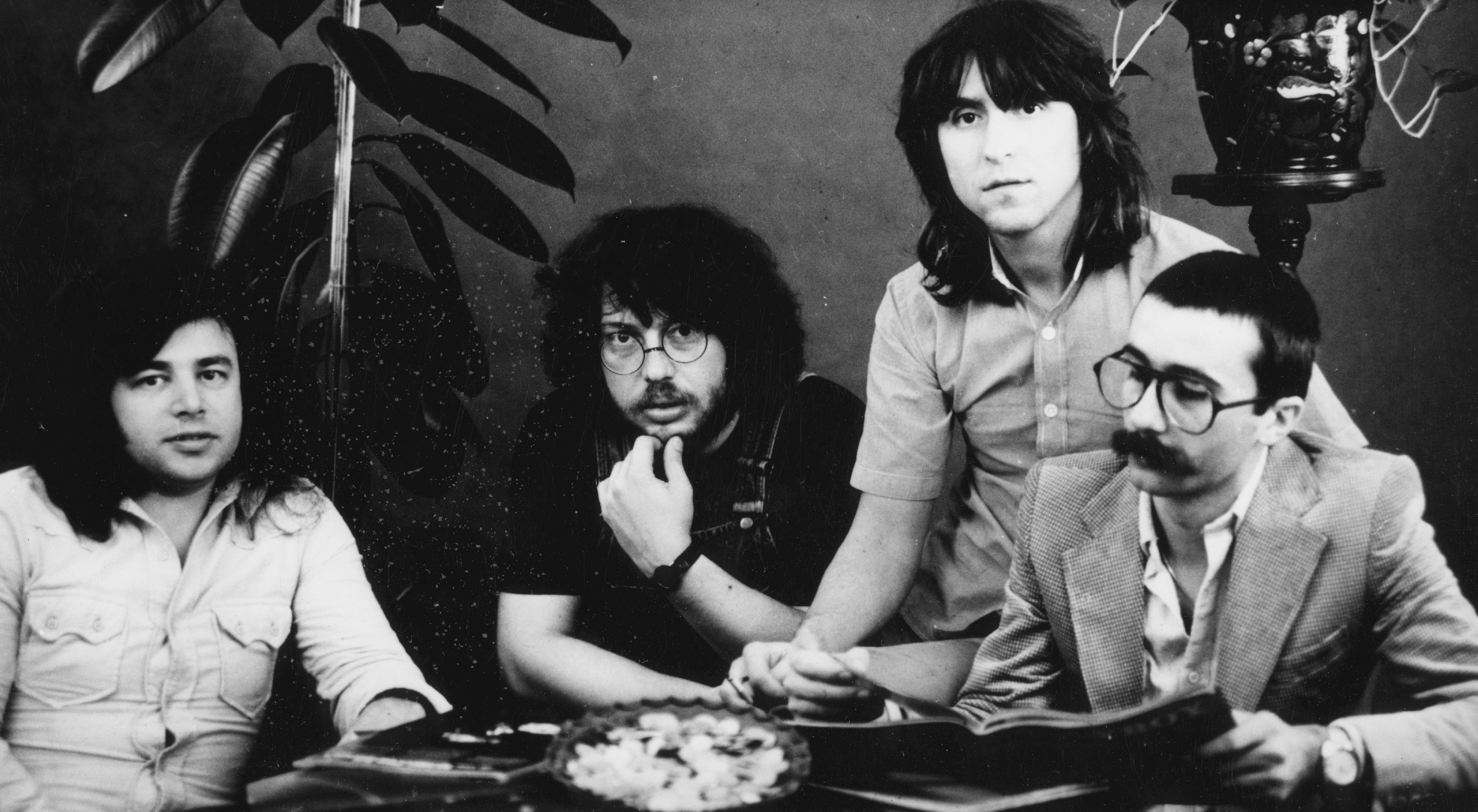
- Locomotiv GT in 1983 (L-R: Tamás Somló, Gábor Presser, János Karácsony, János Solti)

Background information
- Origin: Budapest, Hungary
- Genres: Rock; progressive rock; jazz; funk; pop
- Years active: 1971–1992; 1997–2016
- Labels: MHV; Hungaroton; BMG
- Spinoffs: Skorpió
- Spinoff of: Metró; Omega; Hungária
- Past members: Gábor Presser; János Karácsony; János Solti; Tamás Barta (hu); Károly Frenreisz; József Laux; Tamás Somló
- Website: lgt.hu

Locomotiv GT (often abbreviated LGT, and sometimes using the nickname Loksi) were a Hungarian rock supergroup formed in 1971. Starting out as a progressive rock band, they later experimented with many other styles including jazz, funk, and pop. During their heyday they were one of Hungary's most popular rock bands. The band broke up in 2016 after the death of longtime singer/bassist Tamás Somló.

== History ==
=== Early years ===
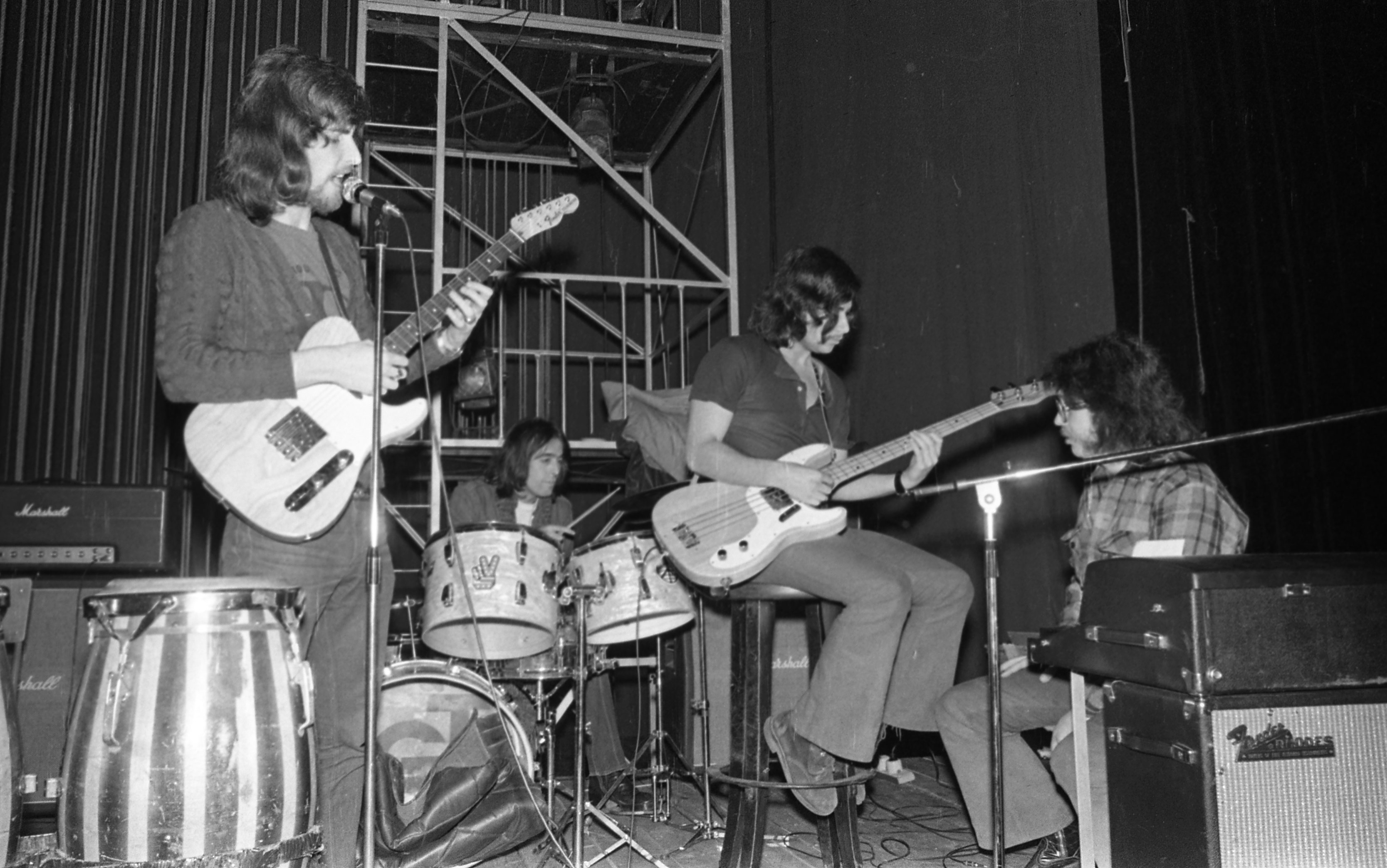
Locomotiv GT performing in 1973

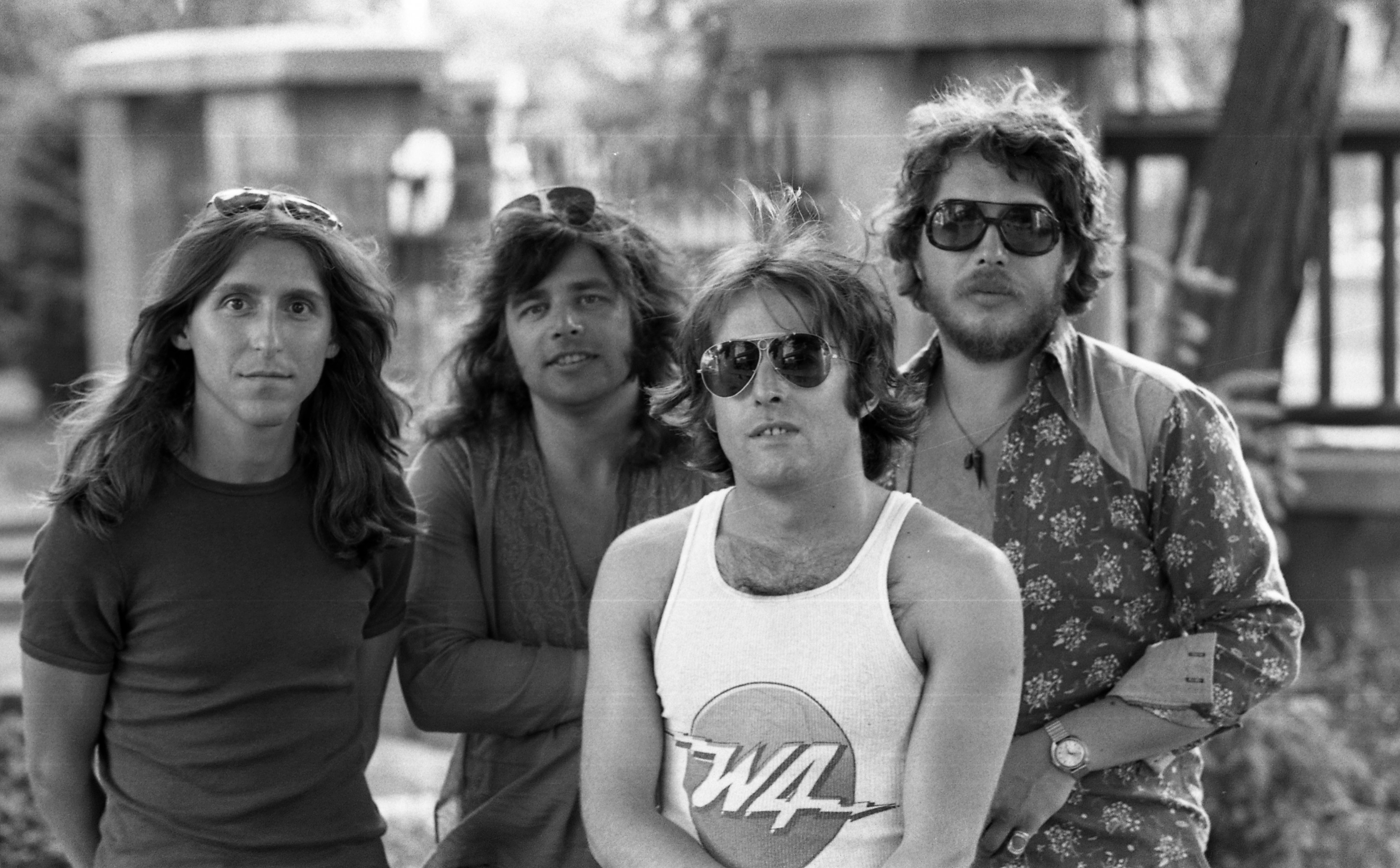
Locomotiv GT in 1976

The band was formed in April 1971 by members of previously successful Hungarian rock bands. A poll in Hungarian Youth magazine listing the nation's favorite rock musicians inspired several of the winners to form a new band together. Singer/keyboardist Gábor Presser and drummer József Laux had been members of Omega, singer/bassist Károly Frenreisz had been a member of Metró, and singer/guitarist Tamás Barta had been in Hungária. They played their first concert in Budapest in July 1971. Much of their early activity was as a backing band for pop singers, due to Hungary's restrictions on employment for rock musicians; they gained notice in particular for backing Sarolta Zalatnay and Kati Kovács during their first few years of existence.

Their self-titled debut album was released in December 1971, and their second album Ringasd el magad was released the following year. They received coverage in New Musical Express, which called them “The new rock sensation [that] could come from the East!”; traveled to Japan to play at the World Popular Song Festival; and were invited to perform at the Great Western Express Festival in England.

In 1973, the band wrote the music for the politicized theater production An Imaginary Report on an American Pop Festival. This endeavor frustrated Frenreisz who left to form his own band Skorpió; he was replaced by Tamás Somló, another former member of Omega. The band's third album Bummm! was released in 1973. Tamás Barta left the band and defected to the United States, which then caused the Hungarian government to ban Bummm! for the next ten years in retaliation. Barta was murdered in the United States under mysterious circumstances in 1982. Barta was replaced by János Karácsony. The band's first three albums were compiled in 1974 for an American/British release titled Locomotiv GT (not to be confused with their first Hungarian release), which included some new material produced by Jimmy Miller and a guest appearance by Jack Bruce on harmonica.

Their first album with Karácsony, Mindig magasabbra, was released in Hungary in 1975. During this period, the Hungarian government suppressed much of the band's work, followed by the governments of neighboring countries like Romania and Czechoslovakia, because the band's rock music was considered subversive; most of their sales and acclaim were gained in English-speaking countries. The English-language songs recorded with Jimmy Miller for the 1974 international compilation were not released in Hungary until 1988. Their 1976 release, the double album Locomotiv GT V., was also banned in Hungary. József Laux then left the band, also to defect to the United States. After the band received help from two temporary drummers, Laux was replaced by János Solti.

=== Later years ===
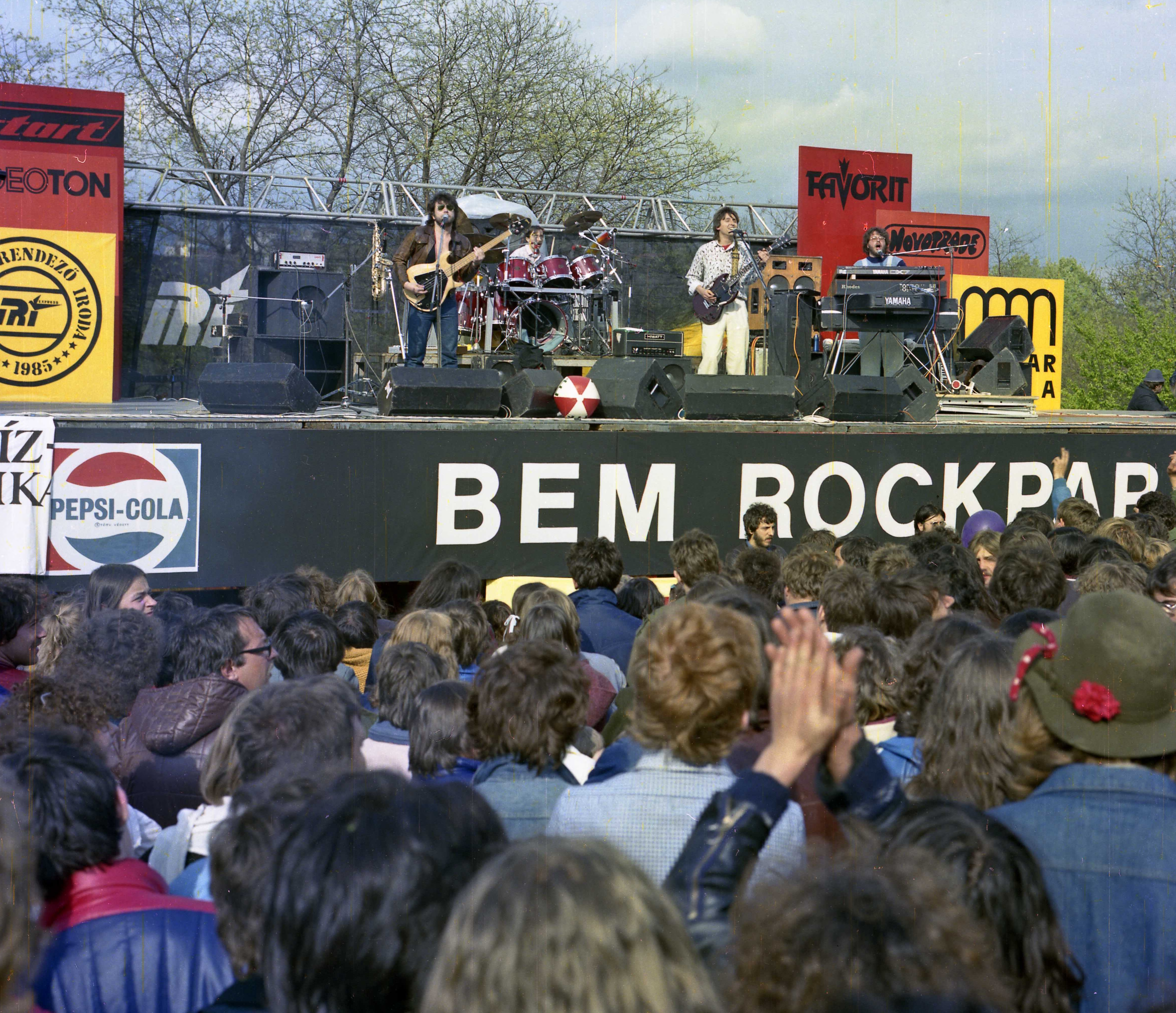
Locomotiv GT performing in 1985

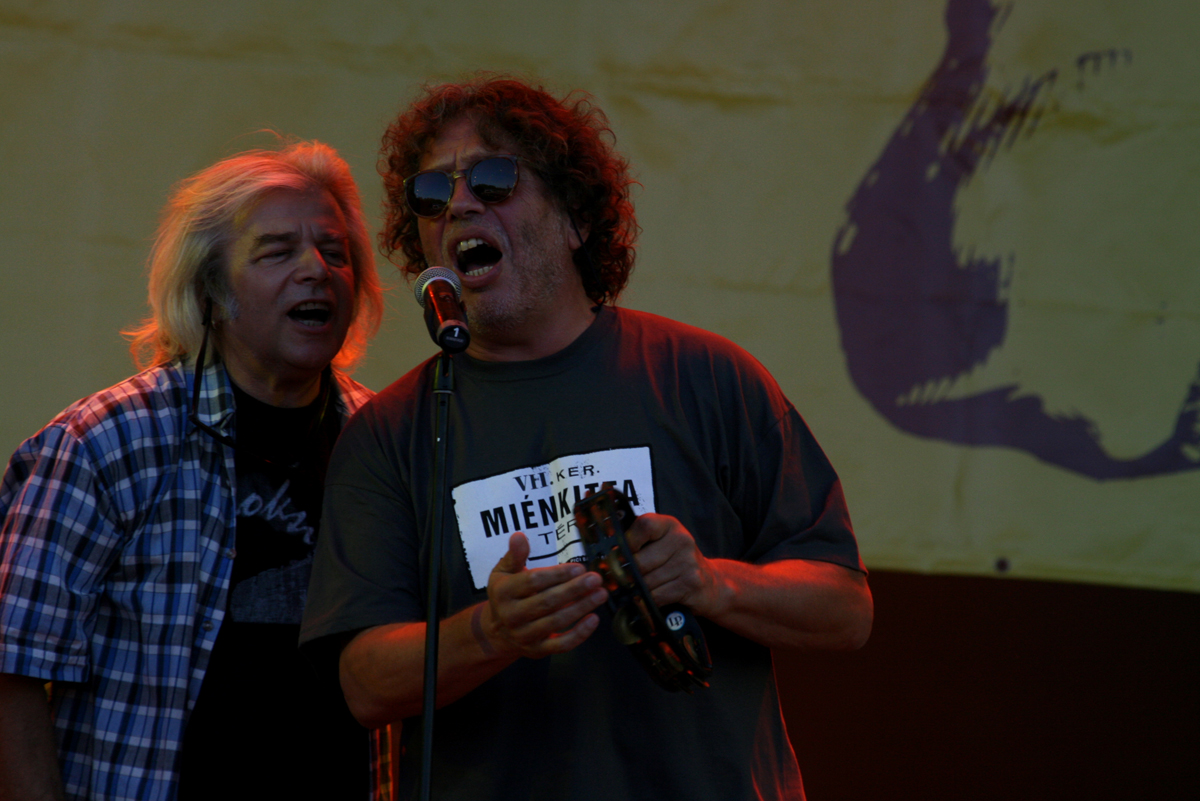
Locomotiv GT performing in 2008

The lineup of Presser, Somló, Karácsony, and Solti remained intact for forty years until the group disbanded. The band released the albums Zene – Mindenki másképp csinálja in 1977, Mindenki in 1978, and Loksi in 1980. The latter album was the first for which they were paid royalties for retail sales. They toured the Soviet Union in 1980 and were offered an international contract by EMI the following year, with an invitation to record at Abbey Road Studios in England. The EMI albums Locomotiv GT X. (1982) and Ellenfél nélkül (1984) were unsuccessful and the band gave up their international touring ambitions to focus on the Hungarian market.

The band ceased regular activity in 1986 but re-emerged in 1992 for a major concert in Budapest celebrating the downfall of Communism. They released the reunion album 424 – Mozdonyopera in 1997. They then became a nostalgia touring act, appearing regularly at festivals and holding their own event, the LGT Festival, annually from 1999 to 2007. Former members József Laux and Károly Frenreisz made some special appearances with the band during this period. The band continued touring until the death of Tamás Somló at age 68 in 2016, after which the band decided to split. Laux also died in 2016 at age 73.

== Personnel ==
=== Members ===
- Gábor Presser — keyboards, vocals (1971–1992, 1997–2016)
- János Karácsony — guitars, bass, vocals (1974–1992, 1997–2016)
- János Solti — drums, percussion (1976–1992, 1997–2016)
- Tamás Somló — bass, saxophone, vocals (1973–1992, 1997–2016; his death)
- Tamás Barta — guitars, harmonica, vocals, bass (1971–1974; died 1982)
- Károly Frenreisz — bass, guitars, woodwind, vocals (1971–1973)
- József Laux — drums, percussion (1971–1976; died 2016)

Additional personnel

- Anna Adamis — lyrics (1971–1976)
- Dusán Sztevánovity — lyrics (1976–2016)

Touring musicians

- Gábor Németh — drums (1976)
- Gábor Szekeres — drums (1976)

== Discography ==
=== Hungarian albums ===
- Locomotiv GT (1971) {USA 1974, ABC Records Inc., ABCX-811}
- Ringasd el magad (1972)
- Bummm! (1973)
- Mindig magasabbra (1975)
- Locomotiv GT V. (1976)
- Zene – Mindenki másképp csinálja (1977)
- Mindenki (1978)
- Loksi (1980)
- Locomotiv GT X. (1982)
- Ellenfél nélkül (1984)
- 424 – Mozdonyopera (1997)
- A fiúk a kocsmába mentek (2002)

=== International albums ===
==== US/UK albums in English ====
- Locomotiv GT (Dunhill Records 811) (made in 1973 with songs mainly of the three first LPs; was released in 1974 in the UK and the US)
- All Aboard (follow-up to the previous album; shelved, never released in the UK or the US due to poor sales of the previous album; released remixed and omitting two of the original Barta penned tracks in 1988 in Hungary only under the title Locomotiv GT '74 USA)
- Motor City Rock (recorded in Prague and released in 1976, without a title; it was re-released in 1978 with a title and was exported to many Eastern bloc countries)
- Locomotiv GT (recorded in Hungary in 1980, without a title; was exported to West Germany and Sweden)
- Too Long (English version of their tenth Hungarian LP Locomotiv GT X (if double albums are counted as two albums); it was recorded in Budapest and London in 1982–83 and was released in the UK in 1983)
- Boxing (made for EMI of songs on their 1984 maxi single "Első magyar óriás kislemez" and the album Ellenfél nélkül in 1985; refused by EMI)
- Locomotiv GT '74 USA (remixed and edited version of All Aboard, compiled by Laux in Budapest in 1987 and released in 1988)
- Locomotiv GT In Warsaw (recorded live in Poland in 1976)

None of Locomotiv GT's Western European or American releases charted.

==== Albums in other countries ====
- Locomotiv GT (Argentina, 1973)
- Ringasd el magad (under the title Locomotiv GT; Czechoslovakia, 1973)
- Live In Warsaw (live) (Poland, 1976)
- Mindig magasabbra (West Germany, 1976)
- Mindenki (Czechoslovakia, 1979)
- Todos (Spain, 1980)

=== Hungary singles ===
1. "Boldog vagyok" / "Ha volna szíved" (1971)
2. "Érints meg / Kenyéren és vízen" (1971)
3. "Szeress nagyon" / "Csak egy szóra" (1972)
4. "Hej, gyere velem" / "Csavargók angyala" (1973)
5. "Segíts elaludni" / "Mindig csak ott várok rád" (1973)
6. "Belépés nemcsak tornacipőben! — Mindenki másképp csinálja" / "Mozdulnod kell" (1978)
7. "Annyi mindent nem szerettem" / "Pokolba már a szép szavakkal" / "Miénk ez a cirkusz" / "Veled, csak veled" (double single, 1979)
8. "Első magyar óriás kislemez" (1984)

=== International singles ===
1. "Touch Me, Love Me, Rock Me" / "Silver Summer" (1971; the existence of this single is not proven, but it is mentioned in the Lexicon of Rock Music by Péter Tardos; "Touch Me" was later released on a compilation)
2. "Serenade" / "Give Me Your Love" (Netherlands, 1972)
3. "Hilf mir einzuschlafen" / "Ich wart' auf dich irgendwo" (East Germany, 1973; German version of the single "Segíts elaludni" / "Mindig csak ott várok rád")
4. "Eine kuckucksarmbanduhr" / "Mondschein im haar" (East Germany, 1973; the A-side is the German version of the song "Kakukkos karóra", while the B-side is the German version of the song "Ksiezyc we wlosy" by Polish band Skaldowie [on the single they are called Die Skalden])
5. "Rock Yourself" / "Serenade (To My Love If I Had One)" (U.S., 1974; first single off the first English LP released in the same year; includes an edited version of "Rock Yourself", both in mono and stereo version)
6. "She's Just 14" / "Free Me" (US, 1974; second single of the LP; includes an edited version of "She's Just 14")
7. "Ringasd el magad" / "The World Watchmaker" (Poland, 1973/1974 (?); includes a live version of "Ringasd el magad" ("Rock Yourself"), probably from the festival in Sopot, 1973; the other song "The World Watchmaker" was written by Polish songwriter Tadeusz Woźniak, an original song called "Zegarmistrz Światła")
8. "Higher and Higher" / "Lady of the Night" (live versions of the songs "Mindig magasabbra" and "Álomarcú lány", performed in Hungarian, only the single has an English title; released around 1975/76, probably when the LP Locomotiv GT in Warsaw was released)
9. "Rock Yourself" / "Serenada — Blues" (came into being under circumstances similar to the previous; the second song is not "Szerenád" but rather "Arra mennék én" which is followed by a blues song exclusive to this release; here "Rock Yourself" can be heard in English, and within it a few lines from "Mindenki")
10. "Vengerszkájá esztrádá" (Soviet Union, 1978; part of the soundtrack to Zsombolyai János's film A kenguru which contained music by LGT as well as Omega, Gemini, Skorpió, Fonográf, Bergendy, M7, Koncz Zsuzsa, Bódy Magdi, Kovács Kati, and Sarolta Zalatnay; LGT's contribution was the English version of "Álomarcú lány" ("Lady of the Night") but the title, "Kák ti zsivjos?", appearing on the disc is in error)
11. "I'll Get You" / "Star" (1979; a promotional single prepared for MIDEM, with English versions of "Engedj el" and "Elkésett dal"; only the lyrics were newly recorded, the background music was copied from the original LP, Zene – Mindenki másképp csinálja)
12. "Tantas cosas que no queria" (1980, Spain; a single from the Todos sampler including the two songs "Annyi mindent nem szerettem" and "Egy elfelejtett szó")
13. Two Krugozor 45s (1980 and 1981, Soviet Union; Krugozor was a Soviet youth magazine which appeared monthly with an included 45; the 1980 single (issue 2, number 11) includes the songs "Rajongás" (Russian: "Vosztorg") as well as "A Kicsi, a Nagy, az Arthur és az Indián" (Russian: "Mális, Velíkán, Artúr í Indéjec"); the 1981 single (issue 11, number 9) includes the songs "Cabolo" (Russian: "Kabolo") and "A dal a miénk" (Russian: "Pésznya nása"))
14. "I Want to Be There" / "Portoriko" (1983, United Kingdom; the first promotional single from Too Long)
15. "Too Long" / "Surrender to the Heat" (1983, United Kingdom; the second promotional single from Too Long)
16. "Too Long" / "Surrender to the Heat" (1983, United Kingdom; the promotional maxi from Too Long on which can be heard the extended version)
