= Gundel =

Restaurant in Budapest, Hungary

Coordinates: 47°31′2.72″N 19°4′38.30″E

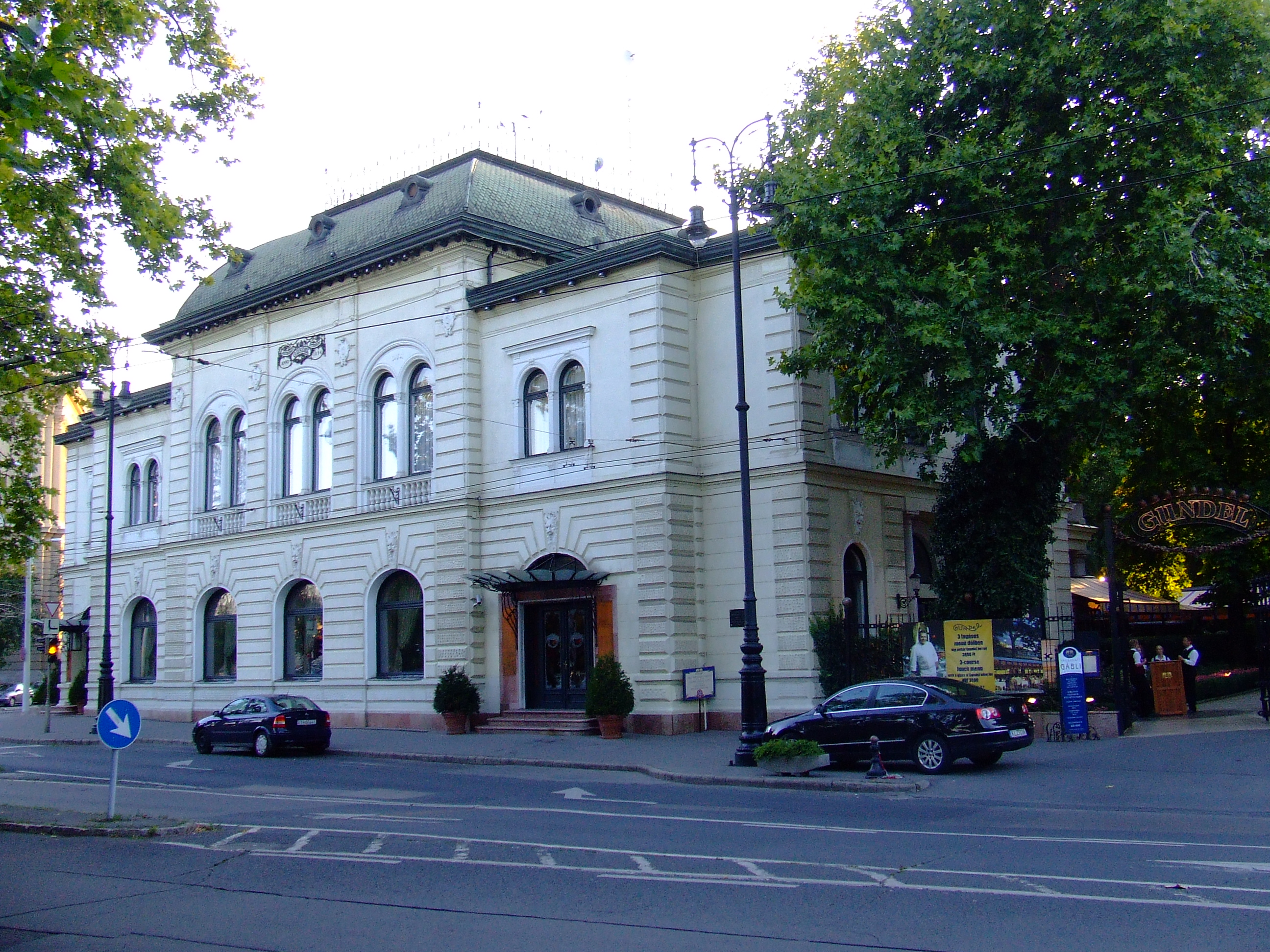
The restaurant building

Gundel is a well-known restaurant located in the Budapest City Park, Hungary.

== History ==
A previous restaurant in the spot, Wampetich, opened in 1894. In 1910, Károly Gundel took over the Wampetich's lease and operated the restaurant. His son János Gundel, who had learned the hospitality trade at other hotels and restaurants, took over the restaurant's management. He created a dramatic and luxurious style that increased its popularity and created an international reputation.

In 1939, the restaurant did the catering for the Hungarian contingent at 1939 World's Fair in New York City. In 1949, the restaurant was nationalized and operated by the state company of the Hungar Hotels, but it was reopened by Americans Ronald S. Lauder and George Lang in 1992. Consultants Adam Tihany and graphic artist Milton Glaser assisted in its design.

== Cuisine ==
One of Gundel's signature dishes is the Gundel palacsinta, a crepe with a filling made from rum, raisin, walnuts, and lemon zest, served with a chocolate sauce. Gundel also claims to have created Palóc soup, a soup that aimed to be "like goulash . . . yet not goulash," according to the Gundel web site.

== The Gay Hussar ==
Victor Sassie, the founder of The Gay Hussar restaurant (in Soho, London) served his apprenticeship under Gundel. Sassie was sent to Budapest by the British Hotel and Restaurant Association when he was seventeen. On his return to London in 1940, he established first the Budapest restaurant and then The Gay Hussar, which was to become popular with left wing politicians.

== See also ==
- List of restaurants in Hungary
