= Zorán Sztevanovity =

Serbian-Hungarian musician (born 1942)

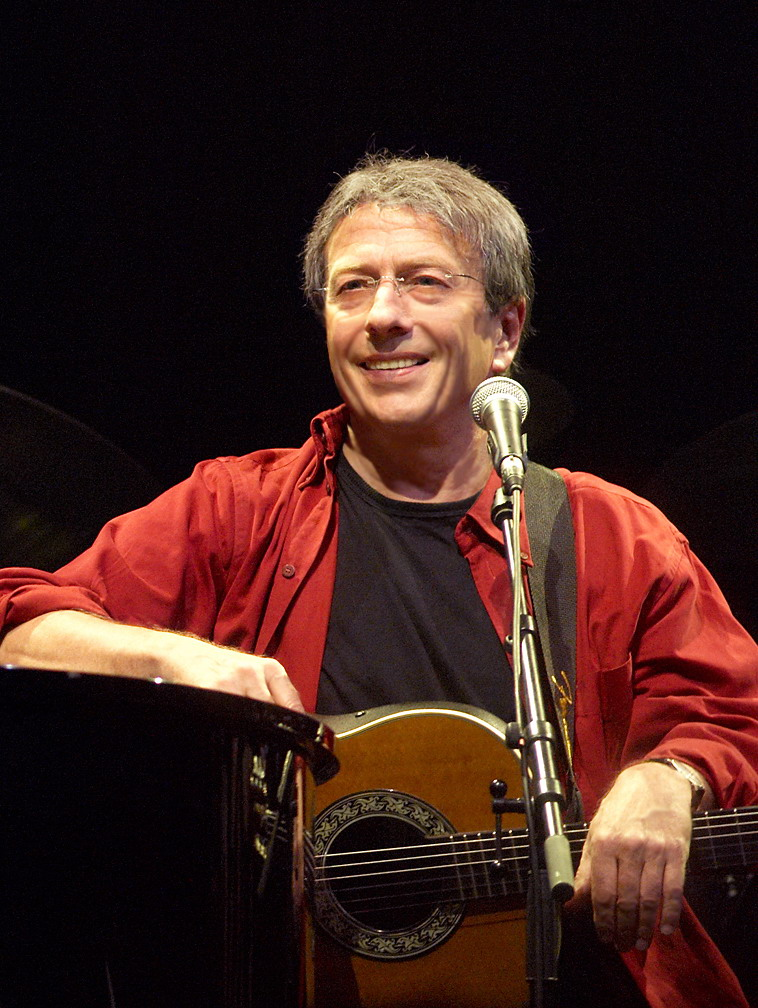
Sztevanovity performing in 2007

Zorán Sztevanovity (Serbian Cyrillic: Зоран Стевановић) (born 4 March 1942) is a Serbian-Hungarian guitarist, singer and composer living in Hungary.

== Life and career ==
Zoran Stevanović (Serbian Cyrillic: Зоран Стевановић) was born in Belgrade, Kingdom of Yugoslavia (now Serbia), on 4 March 1942 and moved to Hungary in 1948 with his parents who were on a diplomatic mission, after two years in Prague. In 1960, with his brother Dušan and their friends he founded an amateur band called Zenith, which changed its name to Metro in 1961, when they began to play in the Metró Klub, the club of the underground building company.

Zorán often took part in talent shows and pop festivals in the sixties with his band or solo and won in 1963 with a Gershwin song. Enthused by success, he discontinued his studies at Budapest University of Technology (he read to be an electronic engineer) and became a professional musician. At this time Metro was one of the three most popular beat bands in Hungary with Illés and Omega, the so-called 'beat-trinity'. Metro published two albums and about 40 singles.

After the Metro's breaking up in 1972, Zorán began a solo career. He played bass in the band Taurus XT and spent some years abroad. He has worked with Gábor Presser, pianist-composer of the Locomotiv GT since 1976. His first solo album came out in 1977 and became one of the most successful albums published in Hungary ever. It contained his best-known song Apám hitte. This LP was soon followed by two more: these three albums are considered to form a single unit in his work and are mentioned as a 'trilogy'.

After his fourth album he received the Franz Liszt Prize given by the Franz Liszt Academy of Music in 1982. In the late eighties and early nineties he presented a program on Radio Calypso. He presented an unplugged concert in 1993 in the Budapest Sports Hall.

Emotional profusion, poetic composition and often a dry sense of humour feature in his songs, which are mostly composed by Gábor Presser and written by Dusán. But he has also sung songs by Leonard Cohen, Mark Knopfler, Chris Rea, Sting and others among his works.

== Personal life ==
He is married to actress Barbara Hegyi. They have two children, Zoltán and Szandra.

== Albums ==
=== With Metro ===
- 1969 Metro
- 1970 Egy este a Metro Klubban

=== As a soloist ===
- 1977 Zorán
- 1978 Zorán II
- 1979 Zorán III
- 1982 Tizenegy dal
- 1985 Édes évek (remakes of Metró-songs)
- 1987 Szép holnap
- 1991 Az élet dolgai
- 1994 Kell ott fenn egy ország (maxi single)
- 1995 Majd egyszer
- 1997 1997
- 1998 Hozzám tartozol (bestof)
- 1999 Az ablak mellett
- 2001 Így alakult
- 2004 A körben (maxi single)
- 2006 Közös szavakból
- 2011 Körtánc - Kóló
- 2014 Egypár barát – Aréna

== Prizes ==
- 1967 Silver Guitar
- 1977 LP of the year
- 1977 Singer of the year
- 1978 Singer of the year
- 1982 Franz Liszt Prize
- 1987 Excellent performer of the year
- 1992 Singer of the year
- 1994 Golden Giraffe Prize
- 1994 Cross of Honour of the Order of Hungarian Republic
- 1994 Golden Europe Prize
- 1994 Prize for a life's work given by ARD Television
- 1998 Golden Giraffe Prize
- 1998 Lyra Prize, Hungarian Performing Arts Foundation

== See also ==
- Hungarian pop
