= Lajos Parti Nagy =

Hungarian poet (born 1953)

Lajos Parti Nagy (born Szekszárd, October 12, 1953) is a Kossuth Prize-winning Hungarian poet, playwright, writer, editor, critic, and one of the founding members of the Digital Literary Academy.

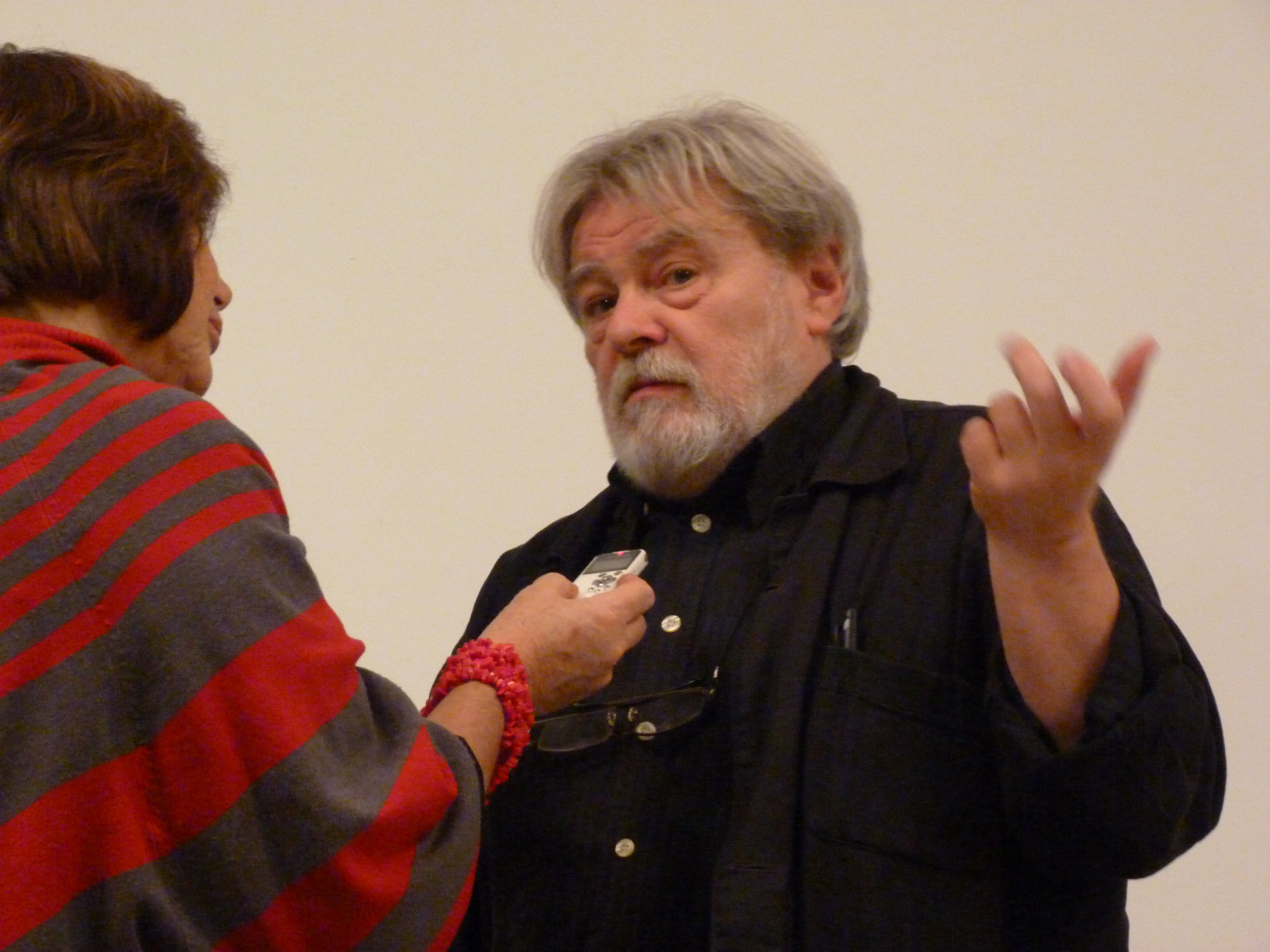
Parti Nagy Lajos, 2011

== Biography ==
Nagy spent his childhood at Tolna, Kaposvár and Székesfehérvár. He graduated from high school in 1972, then graduated in Literature and History in 1977 from the Teacher Training College of Pécs (today: University of Pécs).

He worked for the Baranya County Library for two years (until 1979), then from 1979 to 1986 as an editor for the literary magazine Jelenkor ("Our Age"), in which his poems had been first published in 1971. He worked in the 80s as a member of the editorial board of "JAK notebooks" ("József Attila Circle Literary Association").

He has been living in Budapest since 1986 as a freelance writer and literary translator.

== Works ==
- Angyalstop "Angelstop" (poems, 1982)
- Csuklógyakorlat "Wrist Exercises" (poems, 1986)
- Szódalovaglás "Soda Ride/Riding" (poems, 1990)
- Gézcsók "Gauze Kiss" (play, 1992)
- Se dobok, se trombiták "Neither Drums, Nor Trumpets" (feuilleton stories, 1993)
- Esti kréta "Evening Crete/Chalk" (selected poems, 1995)
- Ibusár – Mauzóleum "Ibushar" [1992], "Mausoleum" [1995] (plays, 1996)
- Sárbogárdi Jolán: A test angyala "Jolán Sárbogárdi: The Angel of the Body" (a "foamsody", novella, 1997; audiobook, 2007), a parody of a teenage girl's diary with corrupted clichés of the uneducated speech
- A hullámzó Balaton "The Rippling Lake of Balaton" or "Billowy Balaton", translated as "A Swell on Balaton" (short stories, 1999)
- Hősöm tere "My Hero's Square" (novel, 2000)
- Fényrajzok "Light Drawings" (2001)
- Kacat, bajazzó "Junk and Pagliaccio" (script book, illustrated by Ferenc Banga, 2002)
- Grafitnesz "Graphitness" (poems, 2003; audiobook, 2007)
- A fagyott kutya lába "The Frozen Dog's Leg" (short stories, 2006)
- A vak murmutér "The Blind Marmot" (prose, ill. by Ferenc Banga, 2007)
- A pecsenyehattyú és más mesék "The Roast Swan and Other Stories" (volume of tales, ill. by Ferenc Banga, 2008; audiobook, 2009)
- Petőfi Barguzinban "Petőfi in Barguzin" (poem, ill. by András Felvidéki, 2009)
- Az étkezés ártalmasságáról "On the Harmfulness of Eating", lecture (2011, 2012)
- Fülkefor és vidéke: magyar mesék "Booth Revolution and its Countryside – Hungarian tales" (2012)
- Mi történt avagy sem "What Happened or Did Not" (short stories, 2013)
- Fülkeufória és vidéke: Százegy új magyar mese "Booth Euphoria and its Vicinity: A Hundred and One New Hungarian Tales" (2014)

== Translations ==
- Tomaž Šalamun: Poker
- Michel Tremblay: Les Belles-sœurs
- Eberhard Streul: The Prop Man
- Molière: Le Bourgeois gentilhomme and Tartuffe
- Julian Crouch and Phelim McDermott: Picture Book for Good Children
- Werner Schwab: Die Präsidentinnen "First Ladies" (joint translation with Mária Szilágyi)

== Awards ==
- 1982: Bölöni Award
- 1987: Zsigmond Móricz Grant
- 1988, 1993: MTA-Soros Grant
- 1990: Tibor Déry Award
- 1991: Graves Award
- 1991–1992: Playwrights Grant
- 1991: Magyar Napló Award
- 1991: New Hungarian Radio Play Award
- 1992: Attila József Award
- 1992: Károly Puskás Award
- 1993, 1996: Theatre Critics' Award
- 1993: Ernő Szép Award
- 1994: Book of the Year Award
- 1994: Soros Award
- 1994: Artisjus Award
- 1994: Kulturfonds Wiepensdorf Grant
- 1996: Laurel Wreath of the Hungarian Republic
- 1996: Award of the Kelemen Mikes Kör in the Netherlands (Association for Hungarian Art, Literature and Science in the Netherlands)
- 1996: Writers Book Store's Marble Award
- 1996: Drama Critics' Award (Mausoleum)
- 1996: Laurel Wreath of the Hungarian Republic
- 1997: Alföld Award
- 1998: New Hungarian Radio Play Award
- 1998: Alföld Award
- 2001, 2002: DAAD Award
- 2004: Hungarian Literary Award
- 2003: For Budapest Award
- 2004: Júlia Szinnyei Memorial Award
- 2005: Order of Merit of the Hungarian Republic (civilian) - Officer Cross
- 2005: Translator's Award of the Federal Chancellor of Austria
- 2007: Ernő Szép Award
- 2007: Prima Award
- 2007: Kossuth Award
- 2012: János Déri Award
