= Metró (Hungarian band) =

Hungarian rock band active 1960-1972

Metró was a Hungarian rock band in the 1960s and early 1970s. Despite the Communist regime's condemnation of rock music, Metró found success and was able to release an album and appear on some television shows, as were their contemporaries Illés and Omega. The band broke up due to the difficulty of promoting their music under Communism. Some members of Metró later formed the long-running hard rock bands Taurus and Locomotiv GT. Band leader Zorán Sztevanovity has pursued an active solo career.

The band played reunion shows in 1992, 2001, and 2006.
