= Tamás Somló =

Hungarian musician (1947–2016)

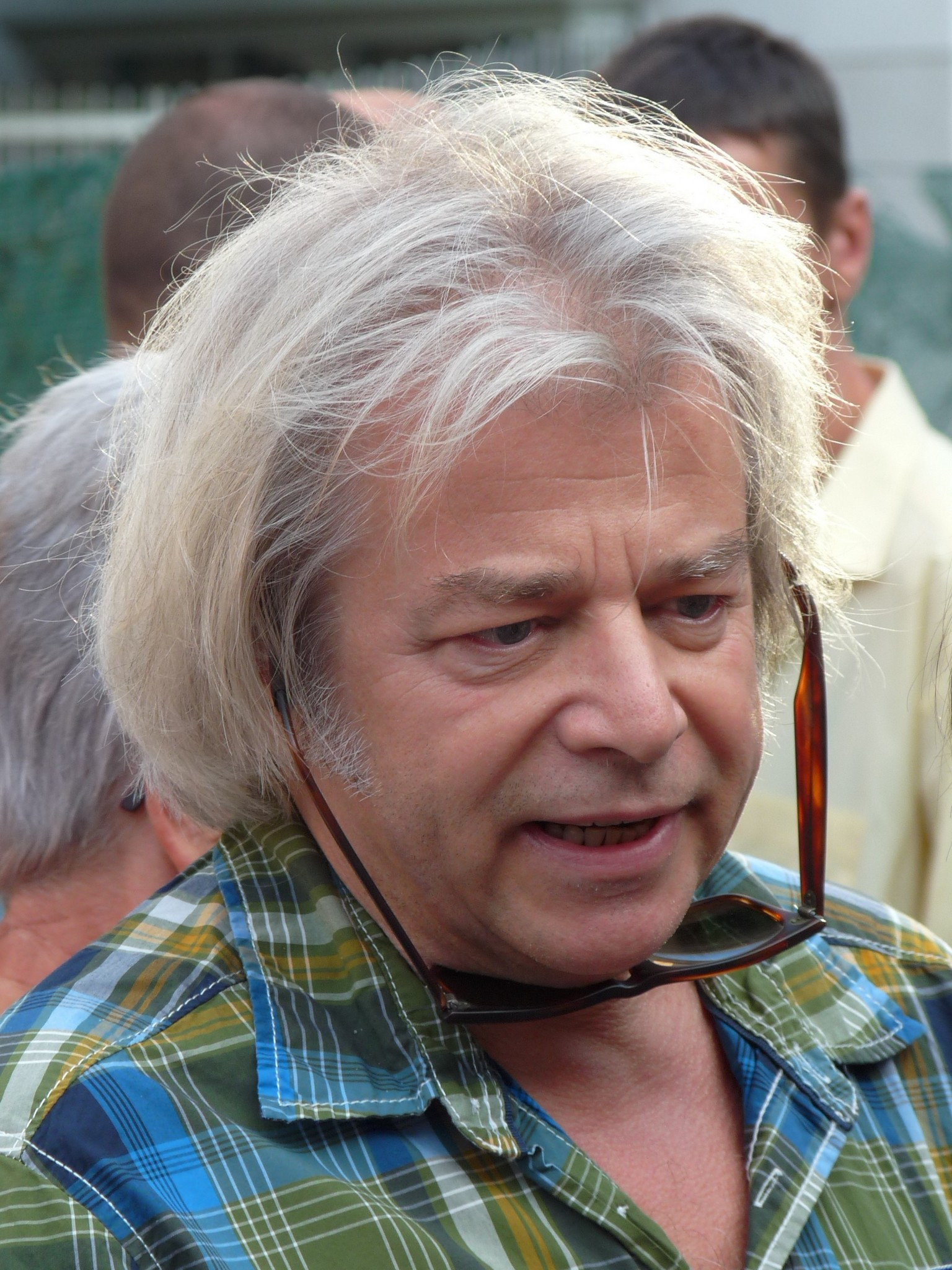
Somló in 2009

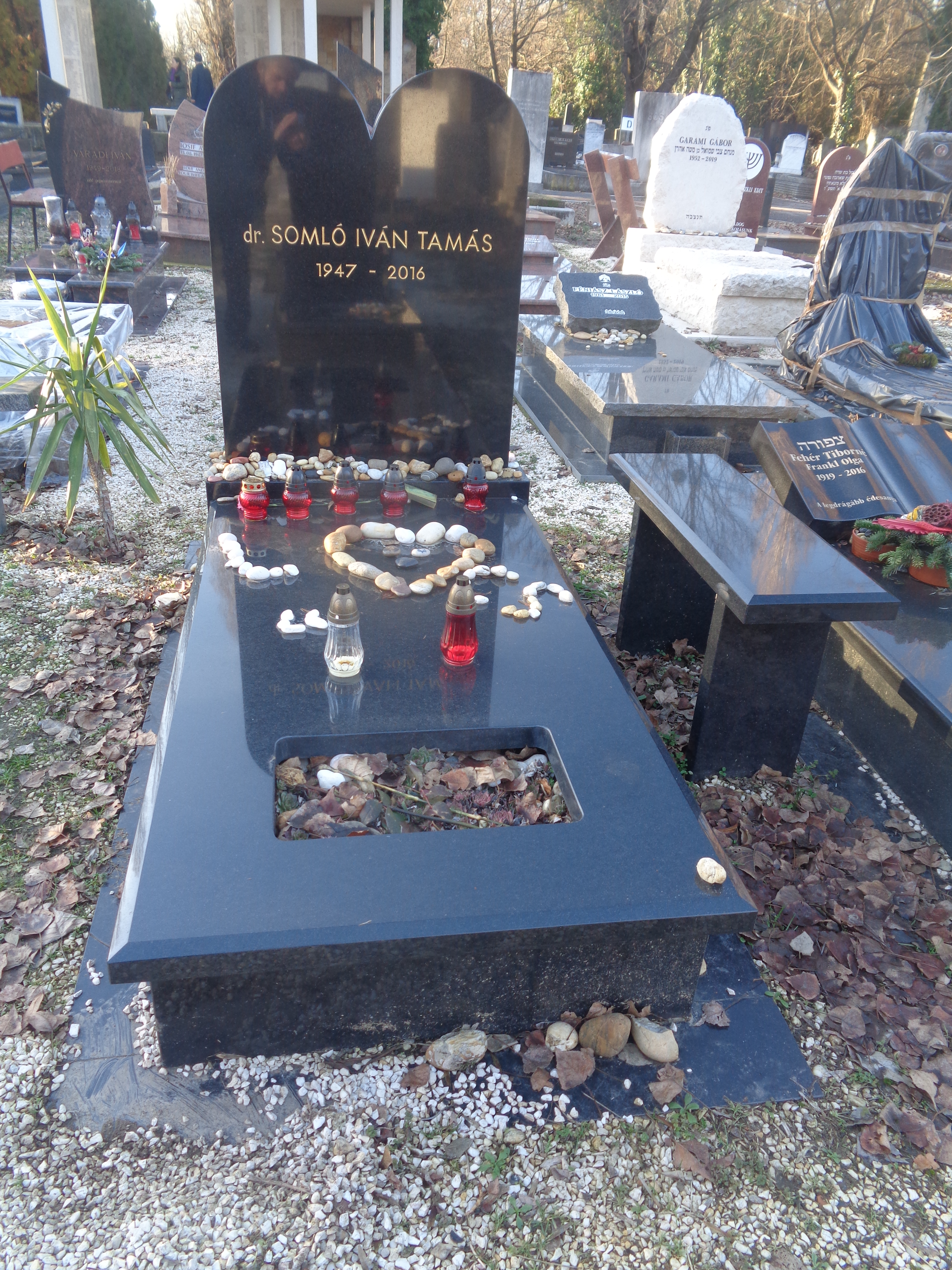
Grave of Tamás Somló (Kozma Street Cemetery)

Tamás Somló (17 November 1947 – 19 July 2016) was a Hungarian musician and artist. He is mostly known for having been a member of Hungarian rock bands Omega and Locomotiv GT and for composing several of their successful songs. His main instruments were bass guitar, clarinet, and saxophone, and he also performed as a singer.

== Biography ==
Somló was born on 17 November 1947 in the Transylvania region. He was enrolled in the music department of Prater Street Elementary School in Józsefváros, where he studied violin. He later attended the State Ballet Institute High School, where he studied saxophone and wind instruments, and then started to play the piano and bass guitar. At the suggestion of Sándor Heinemann, the former director of the Royal Revue Theatre, Somló transferred State Artist Training School where the curriculum included juggling, acrobatics, dance, and karate. He traveled the world as a musical clown with his own group called Five Luxors.

He joined the rock band Omega in 1964 on saxophone, and remained with that band until 1968. In 1973 Somló joined Locomotive GT as bassist, replacing departed member Károly Frenreisz. That band had been formed two years earlier by two other former members of Omega, Gábor Presser and József Laux. Somló remained with Locomotive GT until his death in 2016. He also released solo material in the 1990s when Locomotive GT was on hiatus.

Somló died of cancer on 19 July 2016 at the age of 68. Many Hungarian rock musicians attended his funeral. Locomotiv GT decided to split in honor of Somló's memory.

== Awards ==
- Order of Merit of the Republic of Hungary (2004)
