= Nguyen Thanh Hien =

- Also known as: Hien, Hyenn
- Born: Nguyễn Thanh Hiền; 6 March 1994 (age 32); Budapest, Hungary
- Genres: R&B, pop music
- Occupations: Singer, musician, entertainer, dancer, model, pianist, fiddler
- Instruments: Vocals, piano, violin
- Years active: 2008–present
- Label: Tom-Tom Records
- Website: hienmusic.com

Nguyễn Thanh Hiền or simply Hien (born 6 March 1994) is a Hungarian pop singer of Vietnamese descent who competed in the Hungarian Megasztár sixth season and was the fifth runner up.

== Biography ==
Hien attended school between 2000 and 2006 at Sopron's at the Lackner Kristóf Elementary School, where besides traditional subjects she studied the violin, piano and singing lessons. Between 2006 and 2009, she was a student in the Sopron's Széchenyi István Secondary School. After her family moved to Budapest, she attended the Trefort Ágoston Secondary School.

== Music career ==
Hien appeared during 2008 in the TV2 musical talent the show of Megasztár, where she advanced to 6th place.

In the Megasztár finals she appeared in the following productions:

- Top 15: If I Ain't Got You (Alicia Keys)
- 1. Final: "Crazy in Love" (Beyoncé Knowles song)
- 2. Final: Umbrella (Rihanna)
- 3. Final: A fák is siratják (Locomotiv GT)
- 4. Final: Boldogság gyere haza (Cserháti Zsuzsa)
- 5. Final: Su-su bolondság – duet with Lüszi Tóth (Izsmán Nelly)
- 5. Final: Nobody Wants to Be Lonely – duet with Laci Gáspár (Ricky Martin and Christina Aguilera)

=== After Megasztár ===
After that talent show Hien signed on to Tom-Tom Records.

- On 22 July 2009 Hien appeared in her first music video, Túl szép. The number has been successful in Hungary, on the VIVA TV Charts reached #3.
- On 10 November 2009 Hien released her first album titled Játék az egész. The album on 3 March 2010 was added to the MAHASZ list and reached 23rd place.
- On 11 March 2010 Hien appeared in the second video clip of the album's title track, Játék az egészhez.
- On 17 June 2010 Hien appeared on the VIVA Comet gala's 10th Anniversary where she won the best video category. Bajkov Valentin and Pál Nánási creation, Túl szép won the VIVA Award this year.

Her greatest success was English-language song, "Not Livin' in Yesterday". It was presented for the first time in 2011 in Berlin, Germany.

== Discography ==
=== Singles ===
- 2009 "Túl szép"
- 2010 "Játék az egész"
- 2011 "Not Livin' in Yesterday"
- 2019 "Boy"

=== Albums ===
- 2009 Játék az egész studio album released on 13 November 2009, hitting 23 on MAHASZ Top 40

=== Music videos ===
- 2009 – Túl szép
- 2010 – Játék az egész
- 2011 – Not Livin' in Yesterday
- 2019 - Boy

== Television appearances ==
- Megasztár – contestant
- Hal a tortán – contestant
- Aktív – guest
- A Dal 2014 - contestant, was eliminated in the first heat.

== See also ==
- Hungarian pop
