= Hungarian pop =

Music genre or scene

Hungarian pop is the pop music scene of Hungary. It is often associated with Rezső Seress's song "Gloomy Sunday" which was covered by numerous artists. The most notable artists include Zsuzsa Koncz, Kati Kovács, János Bródy, Zorán, Péter Máté and famous bands like Illés, Quimby, Republic, Locomotiv GT, Omega, Neoton Família. Among the new talents are Azahriah, Krúbi, and Dzsúdló.

== History ==
=== 1930s ===
One of the early acts is associated with Rezső Seress who composed the worldwide hit Gloomy Sunday while living in Paris, in an attempt to become established as a songwriter in late 1932. Seress composed the song at the time of the Great Depression and increasing fascist influence in Hungary, although sources differ as to the degree to which his song was inspired by personal melancholy rather than concerns about the future of the world.

In the 1930s and 1940s Pál Kalmár was one of the most celebrated singers in Hungary. He was also noted for singing the song Gloomy Sunday. He also appeared in the 1935 film St. Peter's Umbrella, directed by Géza von Cziffra.

=== 1940s ===
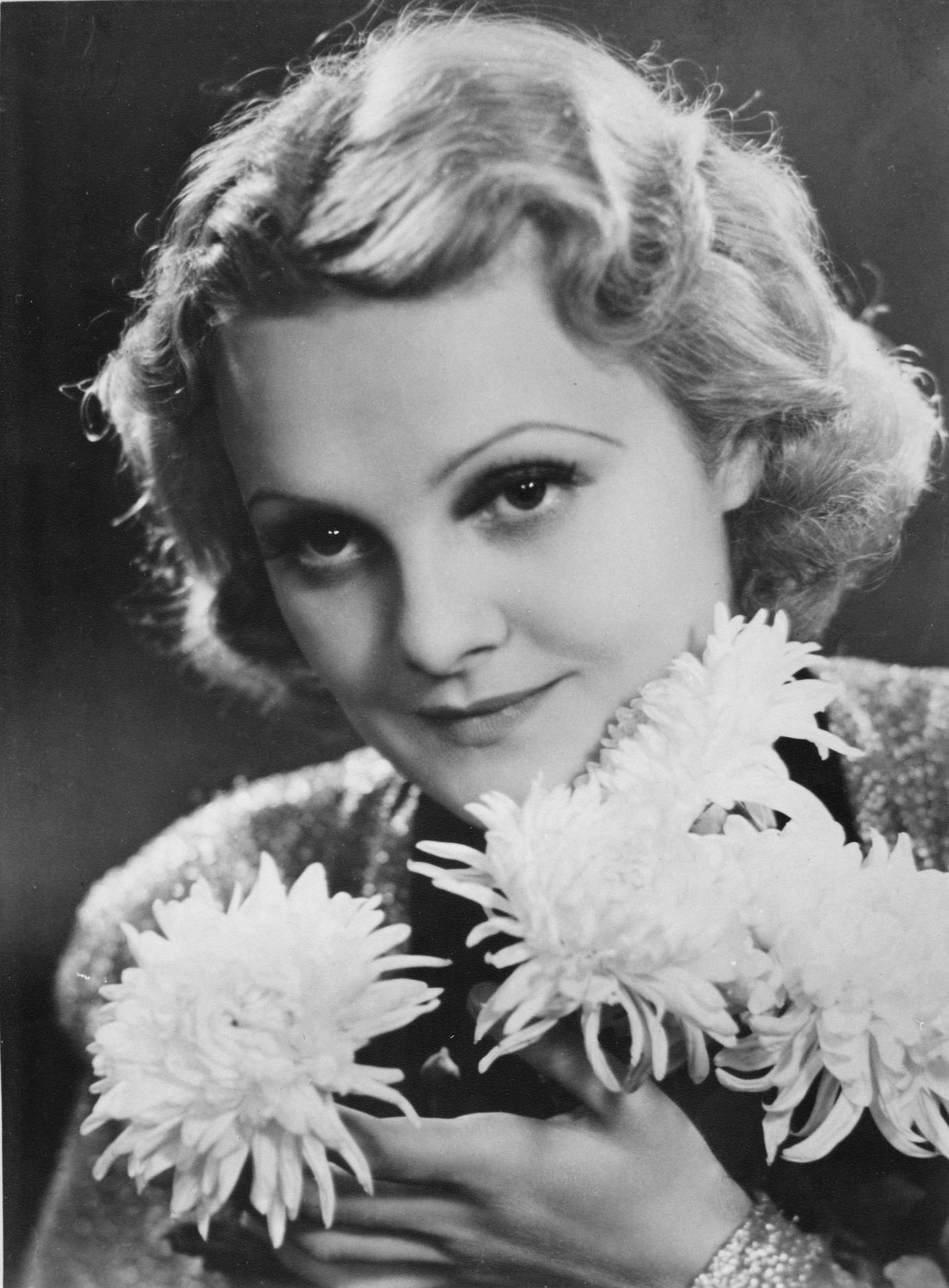
Vali Rácz, actress and singer during the '30s and '40s

In the late 1930s Vali Rácz became a popular Hungarian singer and actress reaching her zenith in the 1940s. She was a regular nightclub performer and a recording artist. Rácz also appeared in approximately 20 Hungarian feature films. Due to her glamorous looks and sex appeal she gained reputation as the ‘Hungarian Marlene Dietrich’. Vali Rácz finished the Franz Liszt Academy of Music in Budapest 1932. From 1933 to 1934 she played at City Theatre and then at Hungarian Theatre. From 1936 she sang at 'Terézkörúti Színpad' and at City Theatre for three years. After 1945 she was a member of Royal Revue-theatre, Medgyaszay Theatre, then Kamara Varieté. She acted in twenty films, but was primarily a chanteuse, giving solo concerts at the Music Academy and Vigadó Concert Hall, as well as appearing regularly at the Hangli Kioszk nightclub.

=== 1950s ===
In the late 1950s Éva Mikes rose to fame in Hungary with her characteristic voice and tender style. Mikes started her music career at the late 1950s at the studio of the Magyar Rádió. She was best known for her lyrical, romantic songs, she scored the first place in the very first Hungarian Top Hit Chart – published in Ifjúsági Magazin (Youth Magazine) in 1965 with her song Te szeress legalább. She became also popular in other Eastern European countries, such as the Soviet Union and Poland. She also appeared at the Sopot International Song Festival. After the local success of beat music classical pop lost popularity, she decided to retire permanently. In 1973 – after her daughter's birth – she left the stage and worked as a music teacher. Her notable singles include Ahogy mentem az utcán (1961), Ami szívemen a számon (1964), Egy kicsi szerencse (1965), Első szerelem (1965), Engem nem lehet elfelejteni (1965), Esős vasárnap délután (1965) and many more.

Erzsi Kovács's first major success was with the song Régi óra halkan jár ("The Old Clock Ticks Softly") in 1957, but she already had a platinum record in 1955, with two and a half million of her records sold. In 1964 her record company dropped her, and she moved abroad. In the next 14 years she sang in Germany, Sweden, and on cruise ships. After her return she toured mainly in the countryside. She also had several concerts at the Royal Park Stage, the Budapest Concert Hall and the Operetta Theatre in Budapest as well. On her album Mosolyogva búcsúzom she sings a Dalida cover Quand S'arrêtent les violons. Her singles include Veled is megtörténhet egyszer/Megszerettelek (1960), Szeretlek Budapest/Rejtély (1960), Ha könnyezni látom a két szemed/Bámulom az eget (1962), Szóba sem jöhet más tánc/Kék öböl (1964), Hová tűnt a sok virág/Ki emlékszik rá (1964) and many more.

=== 1960s ===
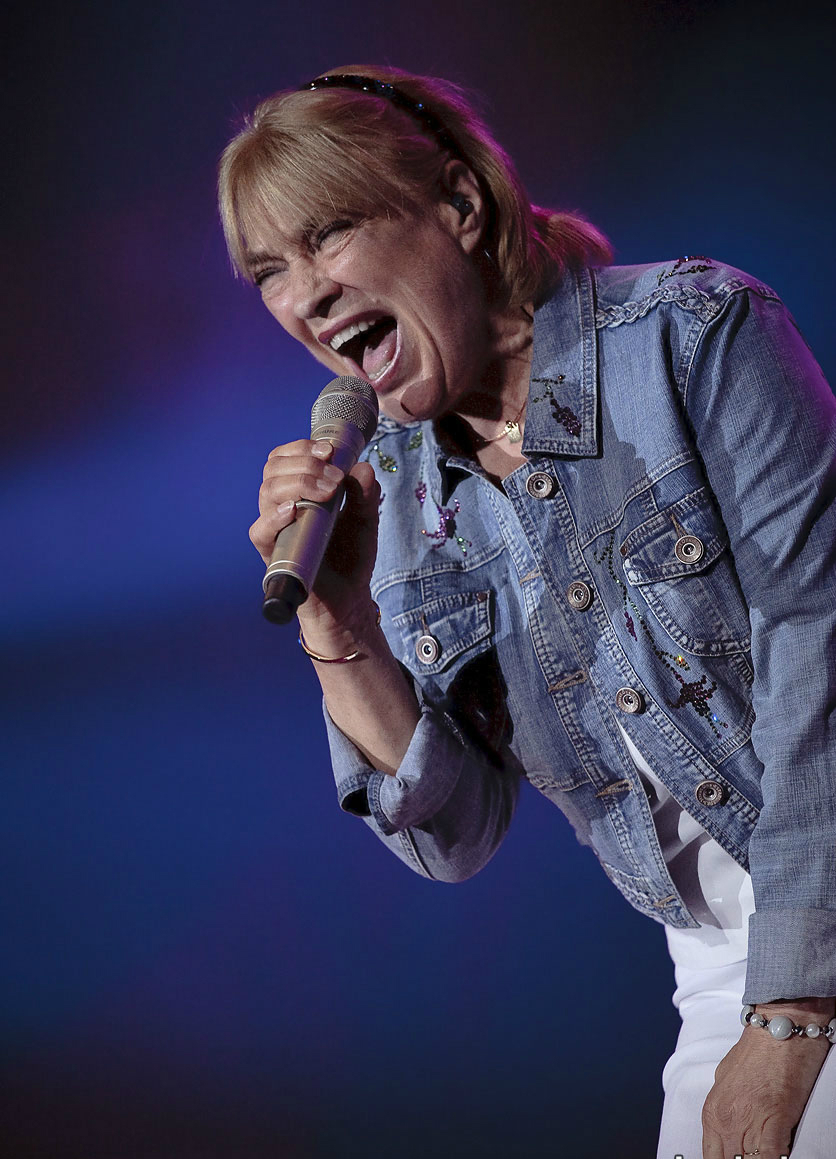
Kati Kovács performing at Sziget Festival in 2012

In 1962 the first Ki mit tud? was held by National Television spanning 10 seasons between 1962 and 1996. Achieving great popularity in the 60s, Ki Mit Tud? helped to launch the career of many artists who later became household names in the country, including actors like János Gálvölgyi or András Kern, singers like Kati Kovács, Zsuzsa Koncz or Zorán Sztevanovity, and bands like Hungária, Metro or Pokolgép.

During the 1960s and 1970s, Ki Mit Tud? became the most-popular and most-viewed show on the Magyar Television. According to rudimentary statistics of the time, the finals were viewed by 88% of the whole population. Using regional quarter- and semi-finals, the contest moved a large number of participants. The 1965's show attracted 28.642 registered contestants performing in 7842 shows, watched by a live audience totaling to 180.000.

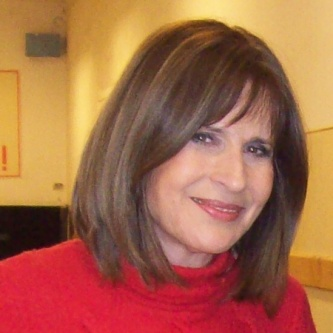
Zsuzsa Koncz (2011)

In 1962 Zsuzsa Koncz won the Ki mit tud? songcontest with her song. She was performing with various bands and musicians over the years, most notably Illés and János Bródy. In the 1970s, she made several successful tours abroad, mainly in Eastern Bloc countries as well as in West Germany (sometimes with the pseudonym, Shusha Koncz and Jana Koncz in German-speaking countries), but also in France, the United States and Japan.

Kati Kovács became the first famous nationally in 1965 when she won the seminal TV talent show in Hungary "Who Knows What?". A year later, she achieved some even greater successes with her performance of the song I Won't Be Your Plaything (Nem leszek a játékszered) which won the TV Dance Song Festivals in Hungary in 1966. The psychedelic spiritual Lord Send Us Rain (Add már, uram, az esőt!) won the Hungarian Dance Song Festival and the German Song Contest in 1972. In 1974 she won the Castlebar Song Contest in Ireland with the song Roses Are Red, Violets Are Blue. In the 1970s, she made several successful tours abroad, West and East – Germany, United Kingdom, the United States, Cuba and Japan. German, English and Japanese albums appeared. Hungarian musical critics have praised her brown, raspy and very strong voice, and they've called her: "The Best Female Voice of Hungary". She can sing opera, rock, jazz, pop, dance, blues and rock and roll.

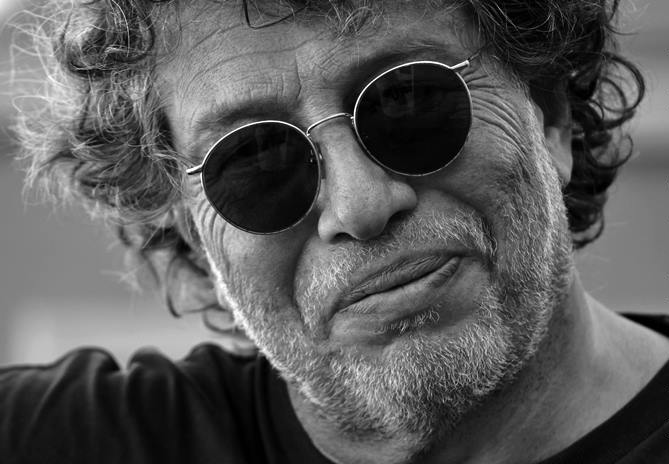
Gábor Presser

In 1965 Zsuzsi Mary appeared for the first time on stage, later she finished on the first place in the Hungarian Television's song contest, the Táncdalfesztivál, with the song "Mama" in 1968. The songwriter was Attila Dobos, who became her first husband. She became successful also in the Eastern Bloc countries too. In 1969, she married György Klapka, and soon after emigrated with her husband. They divorced in 1987, but maintained a good relationship. She returned to Hungary after the end of Communism. Mary came out as bisexual in 2008.

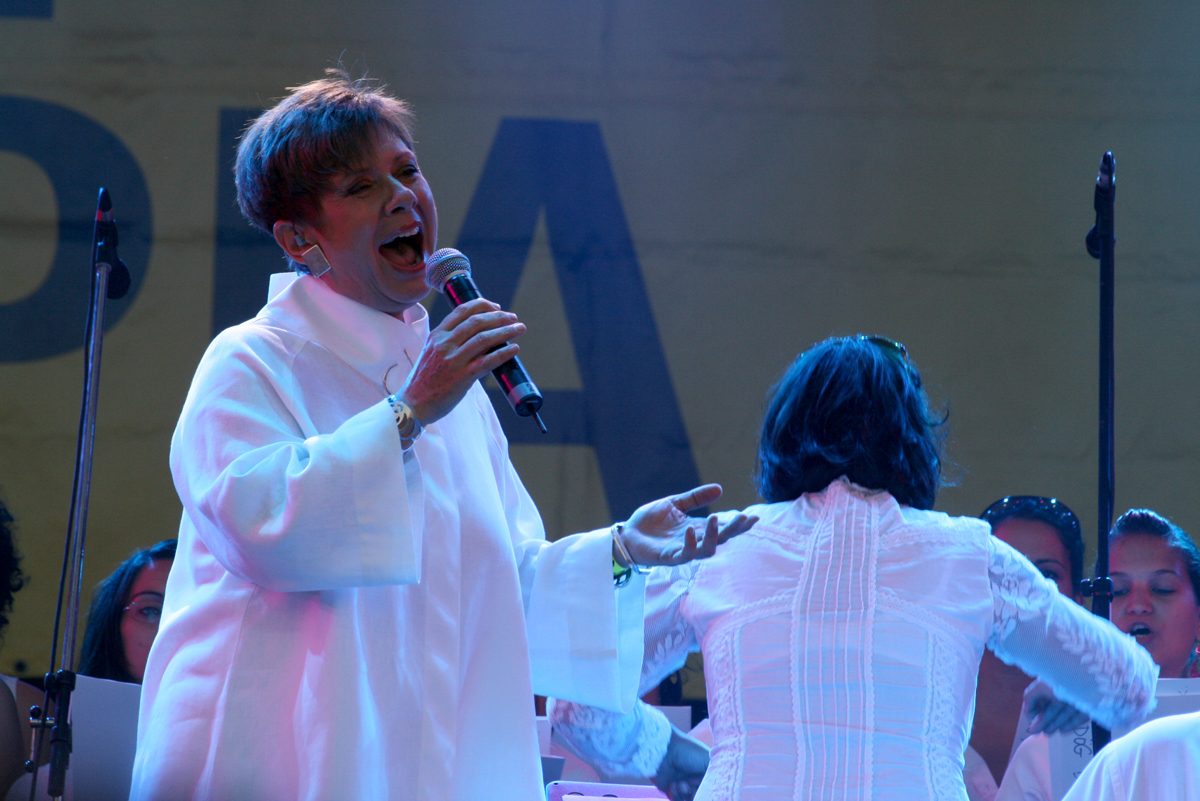
Klári Katona performing at Sziget Festival in 2008

In 1966 a thirteen-year-girl appeared on the Hungarian pop scene called Klári Katona. Her career started after she sang her song Bővízű Forrás on the Táncdalfesztivál of 1972. She won an award for this song. Later, she provided vocals for Kék Csillag and Neoton, then pursued a solo career. In 1976 she gave concert in Istanbul, Palma de Mallorca, and the musical festival of Sopot. 1977 marked the release of her first album, Savanyú A Csokoládé backed by Ferenc Demjén and Bergendy. Her real success came in the eighties with composer backing of Gábor Presser and Dusán Sztevanovity. She appeared as a host on several Hungarian television channels.

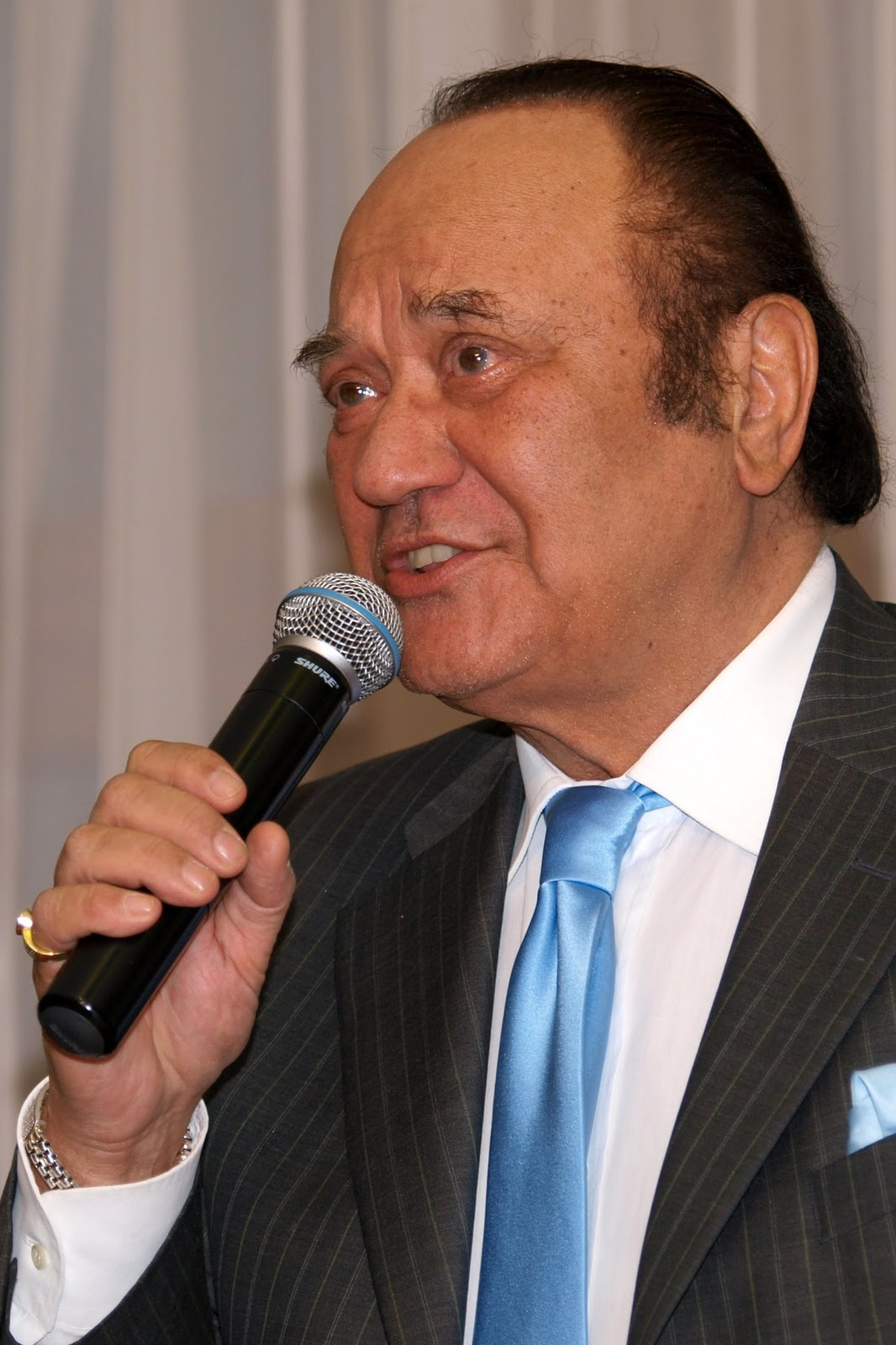
György Korda

In 1967 Pál Szécsi finished second at the Táncdalfesztivál with his song Csak Egy Tánc. Although he died at an early age (aged 30 in 1974), he became one of the biggest icons of the Hungarian pop history. his songs include Egy szál harangvirág, Gedeon bácsi, Karolina, Kék csillag, Két összeillő ember, and Talán sok év után. On 30 April 1974 he was found dead in his home in Budapest.

In 1967 Sarolta Zalatnay finished first at the Táncdalfesztivál winning the golden microphone award as well. Her first record was Ha Fiú Lehetnék which was followed by many other records. Among her famous songs are Hol jár az eszem?, Túl szép volt, Nem várok holnapig, Oh, ha milliomos lennék, Nem vagyok én apáca, János bácsi pipája and many more.

In 1968 the band Illés won the Táncdalfesztivál, while Neoton Família won the Ki Mit Tud? with their song Nekem Eddig Bach Volt Mindenem.

In 1969 György Korda won the songcontest, Made in Hungary. Later, in 1972 and 1973 he won the same competition as the best performer. His first album was released in 1970 with the eponymous name followed by several other records. Among his famous songs are Aki melletted él, Bocsánat, hogyha kérdem, Haver a nőkkel jól vigyázz, Rozsda lepi már az emlékeimet, Fehér galamb, Szeress úgy is, ha rossz vagyok and many more. In the 1980s he married Balázs Klári who was also a popular singer of the 1980s.

=== 1970s ===
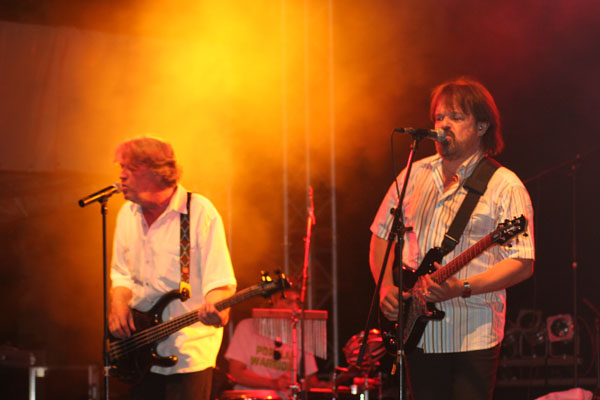
Neoton Família performing at VOLT Festival, Hungary in 2006

In 1971 Neoton Família's first studio album was released entitled Bolond Város. Later the band became one of the most popular pop bands in the 1980s' Hungary releasing more than 20 albums. Among their most famous songs there are: Don Quijote (1980), Marathon (1980), 220 fellett (1981), Monte Carlo (1982), Holnap Hajnalig (1983), I Love You (1986) and many more.

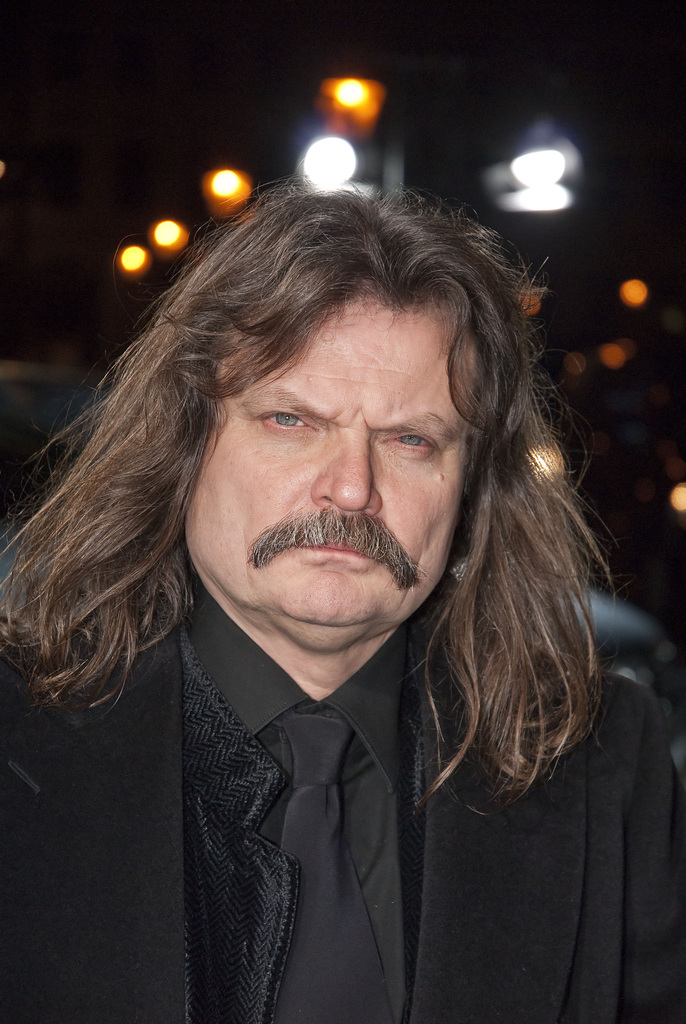
Leslie Mándoki made a career with Dschinghis Khan

In 1972, Judith Szűcs won two victories in the national competition "Ki mit tud?" (Literally: "Who knows what?"). The singer's first album was called Táncolj még (1978) and in a few days this album became a gold plate. Her other albums from the turn of the 70's and 80's were similarly successful. In those years, audiences in Europe considered her the "Disco Queen" of Eastern Europe. Her songs were played on all radiosand and on Hungarian television they did excellent show-programs with the singer. At the Neewollah Festival (USA) in 1983, she won the 1st Prize and the Grand Jury Prize. She sang Szeverevetlevek and Unsent Letter songs here. Her biggest hits are: Táncolj még! (1977), Ha táncolsz velem (1978), Gyere a diszkó klub elé (1978), Járd el a Zorba dalát (1979), A tanítás után (1980), Száguldás (1980), Meleg az éjszaka (1980), Didididididididergek (1982), Itt a karácsony (1983), Elkéstem (1988), Mondd, mit tegyek, hogy érezd (1998), Elvarázsoltál (2007).

In 1972 Zsuzsa Cserháti performed the songs Nem volt ő festő and Repülj, Kismadár at the Táncdalfesztivál. Six years later in 1976 her first studio album was released, followed by several other records such as Többé Nincs Megállás, Édes Kisfiam, Rácsaim Ledőltek Már and many more. Her famous songs include Kicsi Gyere Velem Rózsát Szedni (1973), Árva Fiú (1973), Boldogság, gyere haza (1979), A Boldogság és Én (1981), Száguldás, Porsche, Szerelem (1984) and Hamu és Gyémánt (1996).

In 1973 Péter Máté won the Hungarian songcontest, Made in Hungary with the song Hull Az Elsárgult levél.

In 1973 Judit Halász's first studio album was released entitled Kép A Tükörben. Later she became popular as the singer of children songs. She is also noted for singing the poems of famous Hungarian poets such as Ferenc Móra, Mihály Babits, Attila József, Sándor Weöres and many more.

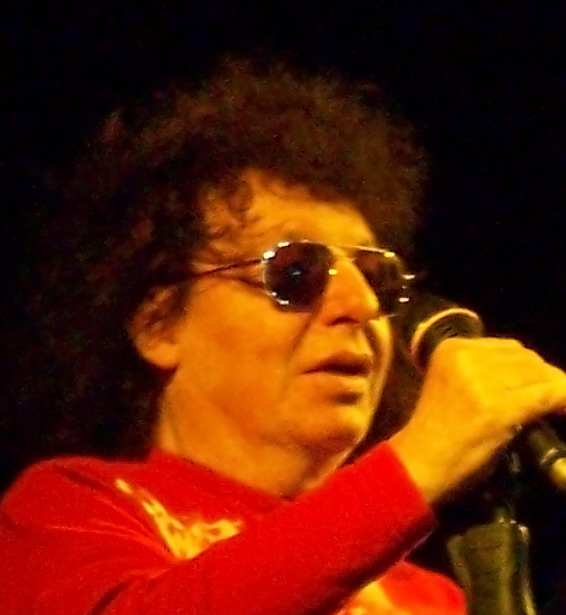
Ferenc Demjén singing at a concert at the Kisstadion

In 1975 Leslie Mándoki fled from Hungary to West Germany. In 1979 he joined the West-German band, Dschinghis Khan. One of the greatest successes of the band was the song Moskau, Dschinghis Khan and Hadschi Halef Omar. Later Mandoki rented the Park Studios near Lake Starnberg, Germany. He has worked as a producer for many German and international acts, including No Angels, Phil Collins, Engelbert, Joshua Kadison, Lionel Richie and Jennifer Rush. He also worked as a musical director for commercials, with clients Audi, Daimler and Disney.

In 1977 Ferenc Demjén's first studio album was released entitled Fújom A Dalt. Later he released more than 20 records and became a pop-icon in Hungary. He also worked with Klári Katona and Kati Kovács on their first albums. His song for the film Szerelem első vérig (1987) topped the Hungarian charts for 8 months. His notable songs include Hogyan Tudnék Élni Nélküled?, Szerelemvonat, Honfoglalás, Jégszív, Ne sírj, Féktelen Éj and many more.

=== 1980s ===
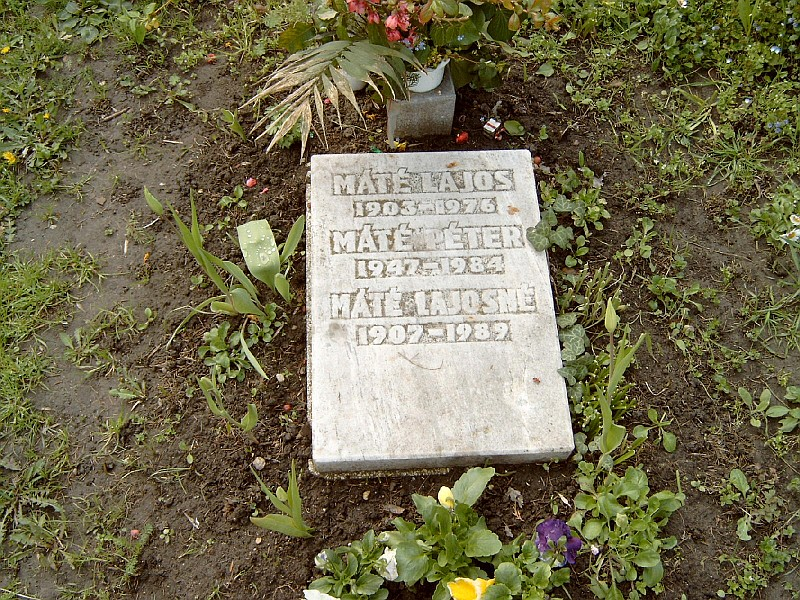
Péter Máté's tomb at the Farkasréti Cemetery

In 1980 former Illés and Fongráf singer-songwriter János Bródy's first solo album was released entitled Hungarian Blues. Later he started writing lyrics for Zsuzsa Koncz and for the musical István, a király.

In 1981 Klári Balázs's first studio album was released. She became popular as the singer of the bands Periszkóp and Skála. Later she married György Korda, who was also a popular singer at that time, and released several albums with her husband.

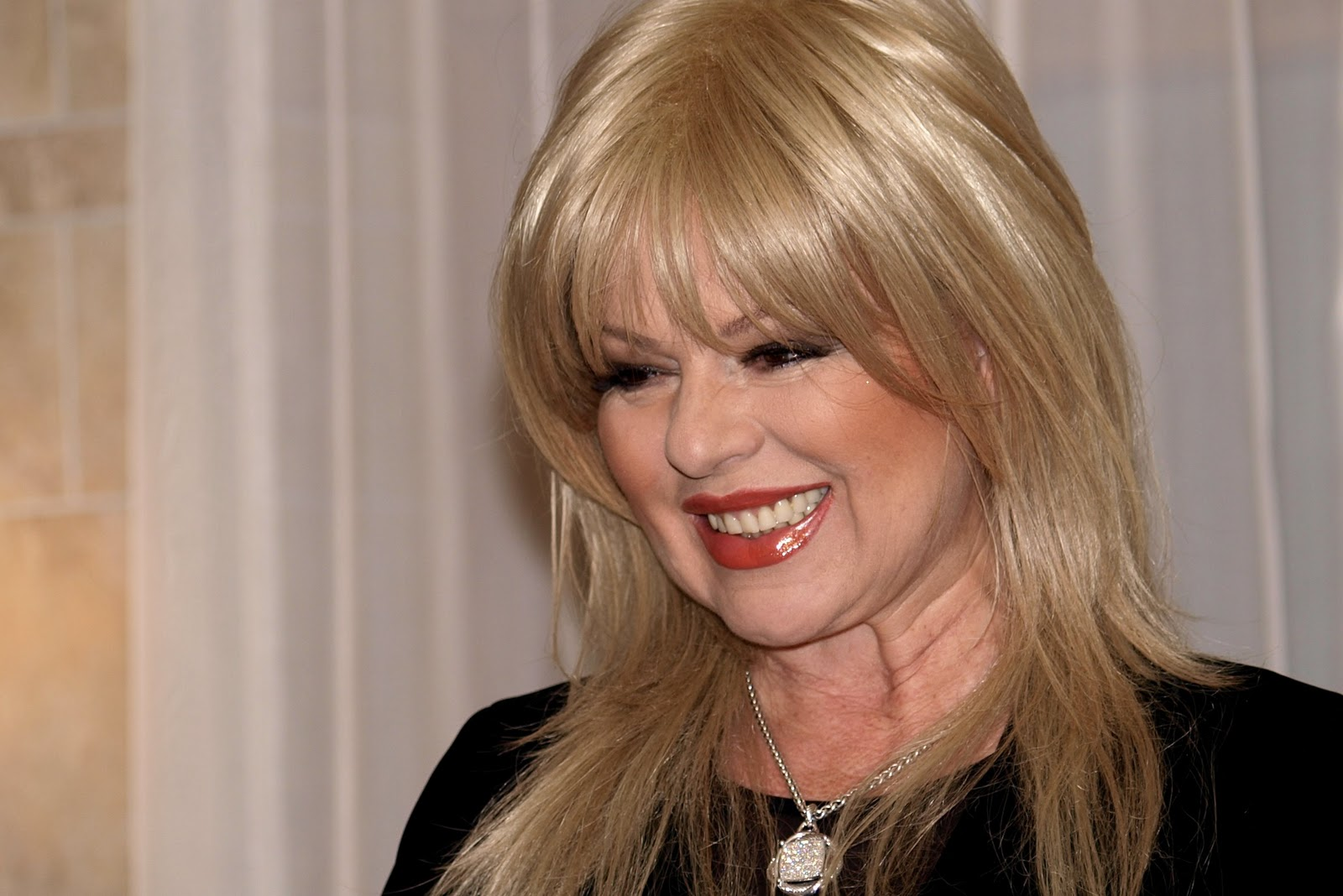
Klári Balázs

In 1983 the Szikora-Környei-led band R-GO's first studio album was released with the eponymous title. Later the band released several other records and became one of the leading bands of the 1980s pop scene. Their most famous songs include Ballag A Katona, Szeretlek Is, Meg Nem Is, Ne Félj, Te Kis Bolond and Szerelmes Vagyok, Mint Egy Nagyágyú.

In 1983 Neoton Famila won a special award for their song Holnap Hajnalig which was performed in English (Time Goes By) at the World Popular Song Festival.

In 1984 Első Emelet's eponymous first studio album was released, followed by several other albums.

Also in 1984, Csepregi Éva, lead singer of Neoton Família, launched her solo career. She released more than 20 albums, becoming a star in Hungary, USSR, Korea and Japan. She performed Korea, the official song of the 1988 Seoul Olympics, with fellow Hungarian Leslie Mándoki.

On 9 September 1984 singer-songwriter Péter Máté was found dead. With only three full-length studio albums, he managed to become one of the most prominent and popular singer of Hungary. His song Elmegyek became a worldwide hit with the title Nicolas sung by Sylvie Vartan in 1979.

On 5 February 1986, Éva Mikes died in Budapest after a long battle with cancer.

In late 1986, new wave/pop band Z'Zi Labor had a big hit with a cover of the Rolling Stone's song "Honky Tonk Woman", which featured the female folk choir of Veresegyháza. They would once also be the starter band for Queen at a concert at the National Stadium in July 1986.

1986 also saw the release of the first album by Napoleon Boulevard, a project started by former members of prog-rock band Solaris, in collaboration with vocalist Lilla Vincze. Their virtuoso music with operatic vocals helped nearly all of their albums go platinum between 1986 and 1993.

=== 1990s ===
On 8 February 1990, Katalin Karády died in New York City and she was buried on 19 February 1990 at the Farkasréti Cemetery. She was posthumously awarded the Righteous Among the Nations by the Knesset in 2004. Although she was mainly an actress, she was also noted for her songs.

Record producer Peter Erdos also died in 1990. He had effectively been the head of the entire Hungarian music industry for decades, responsible for many of the greatest bands but also widely criticised for his numerous controversies and his ability to blacklist any band that was unwilling to obey him. His death, combined with the collapse of the communist regime, ushered in a new era of freedom for Hungarian pop music.

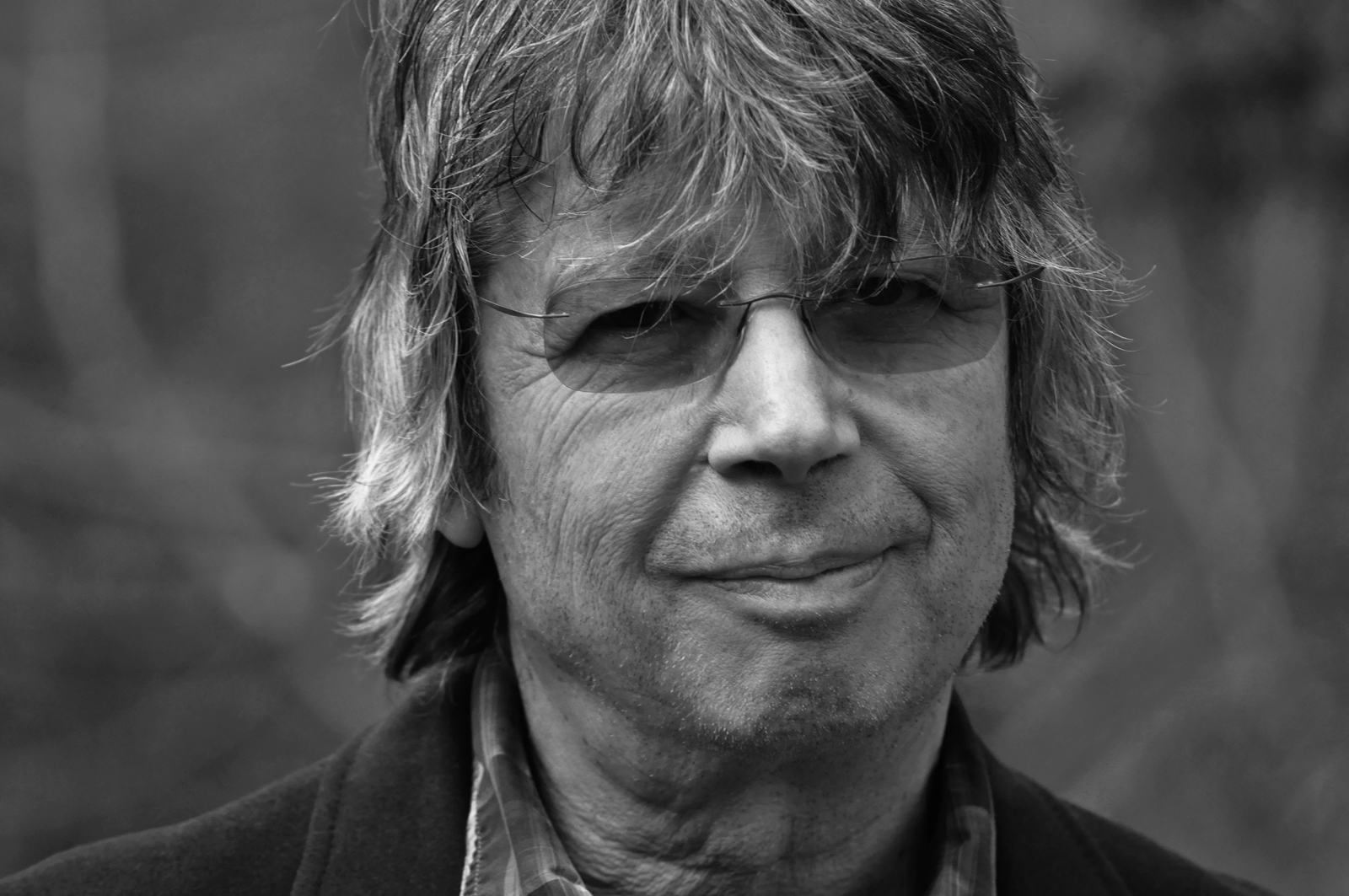
In 1995 János Bródy was awarded with the Order of Merit of the Republic of Hungary for his contribution to Hungarian music

In 1991 Jimmy Zámbó released his first album entitled Csak Egy Vallomás. Later he became the most romantic singer of the country with his songs such as Valahol Bús Dal Szól, Még Nem Veszíthetek, Szeress úgy, ahogy itt vagyok, Ugye nem bántad meg, Fogadj Örökbe and many other. His success can be attributed to the tastes of the Hungarian music listeners who immediately took to Zámbó's melancholic songs.

In 1993 Ákos Kovács disbanded Bonanza Banzai and released his first pop album entitled Karcolatok. Later he released several albums even in English language as well.

In 1993 Andrea Szulák represented Hungary at the Eurovision Song Contest 1993 with her song Árva Reggel.

In 1995 János Bródy was awarded with the Order of Merit of the Republic of Hungary for his contribution to Hungarian music, while Klári Katona received the Order of the Hungarian Republic Small Cross.

In 1996 the Dobrády-Zuber-led T.N.T.'s first album was released by Warner Music Group. The band became one of the most successful pop bands in the late 1990s and the early 2000s. Their most famous songs include Lakatlan Sziget (1999), Sírni Tudnék, Holnap Hazautazom (1999), Bolond Aki Sír (2000), Tiltott Perc (2001), Nem Jön Álom A Szememre (2001), Kicsi Gesztenye (2002), Hova Visz A Hajó (2003), and Egyetlen Szó (2003). The T.N.T. were disbanded in 2005.

In 1997 the band V.I.P. represented Hungary at the Eurovision Song Contest 1997 with their Miért Kell Hogy Elmenj?.

=== 2000s ===
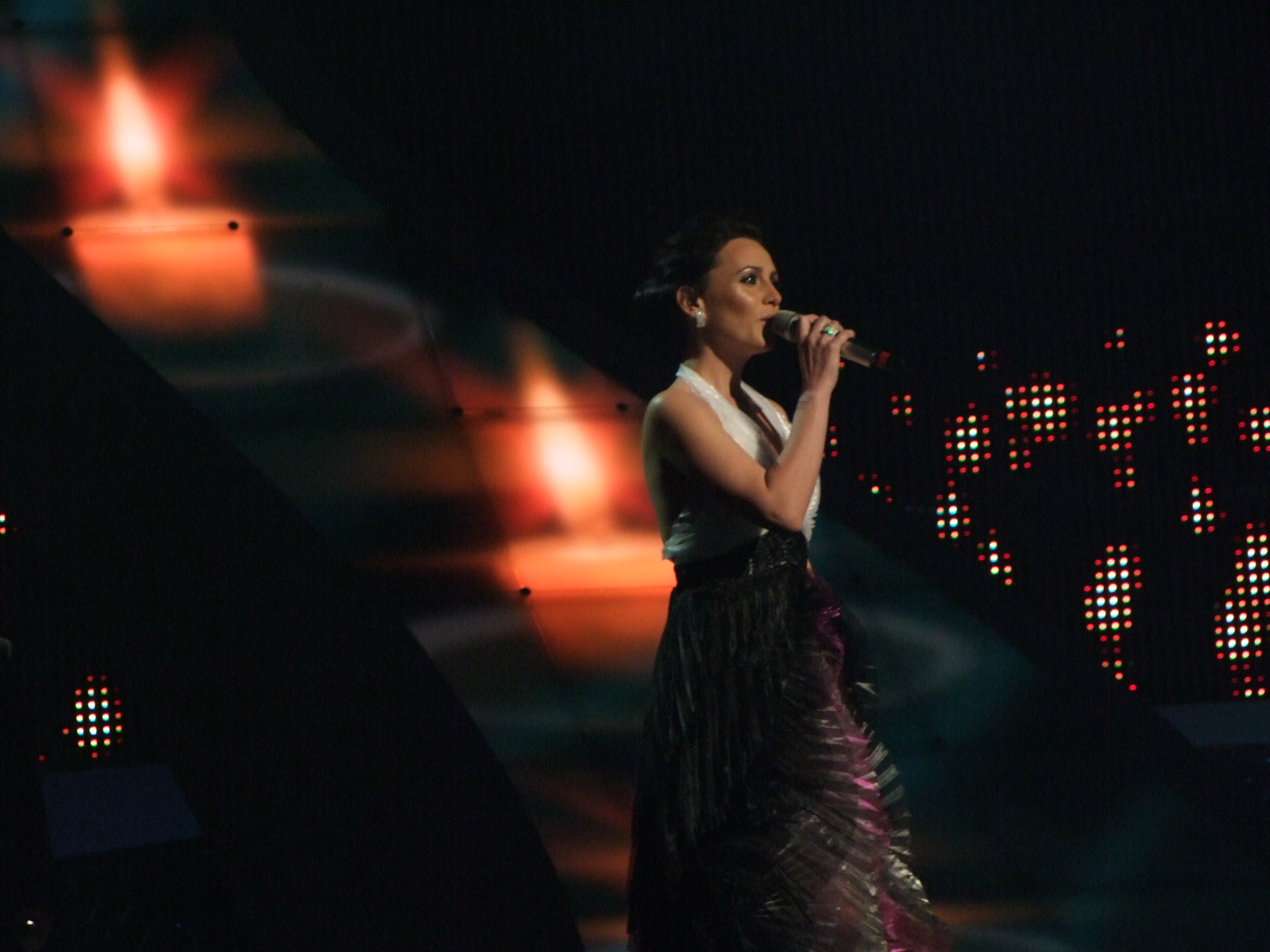
Csézy at the Eurovision Song Contest 2008

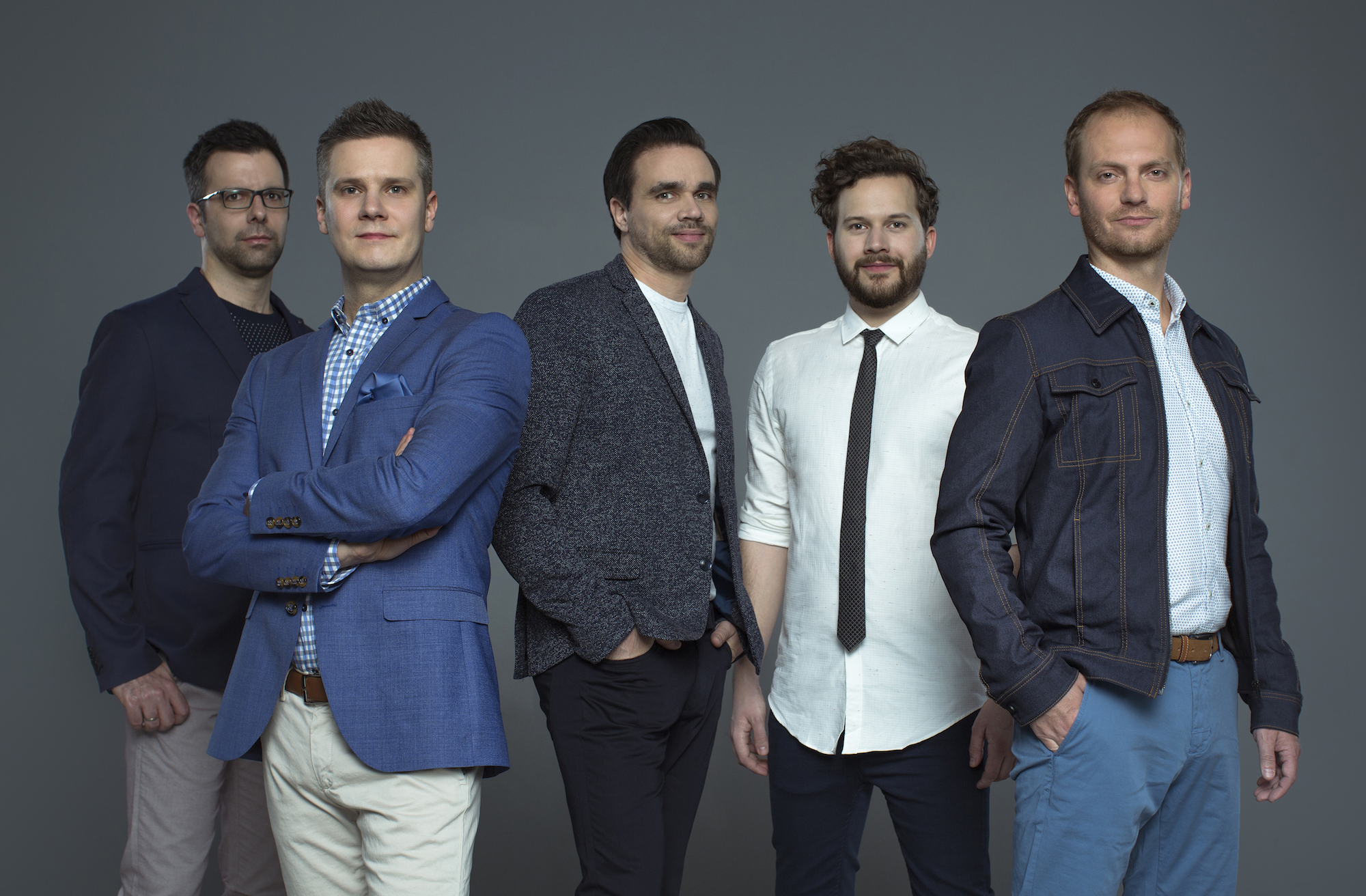
Fool Moon

In 2000 the band Illés were awarded with the Kossuth Prize.

On 1 January 2001, Jimmy Zámbó was found dead in his home in Csepel, Budapest. He is considered as one of the most popular singers of the 1990s in Hungary.

In 2003 Megasztár, a voice talent television series started on TV2. The jury included Pierrot, Péter Novák, Gyöngyi Spitzer (a.k.a. Soma), Gábor Presser, Tamás Mester and many others. New talents emerged from the six seasons including Ibolya Oláh, Veronika Tóth, László Gáspár, Vera Schmidt, Ferenc Molnár, Gabriella Tóth, Tamás Palcsó, Magdolna Rúzsa, Péter Puskás, Nguyen Thanh Hien, Viktor Király, Renáta Tolvai and many others.

In 2006 the first Budapest Fringe Festival was held in the capital city on the model of the Edinburgh Festival Fringe. The festival brings more than 500 artists in about 50 shows to produce a wide range of interesting works in alternative theatre, dance, music and comedy outside the mainstream.

In 2007 the Hungarian indie-pop band The Moog became the first artist from the country to sign a record contract with an American label, Musick Records. Since then the band have released three full-length studio albums, Sold for Tomorrow, Razzmatazz Orfeum, and Seasons in the Underground.

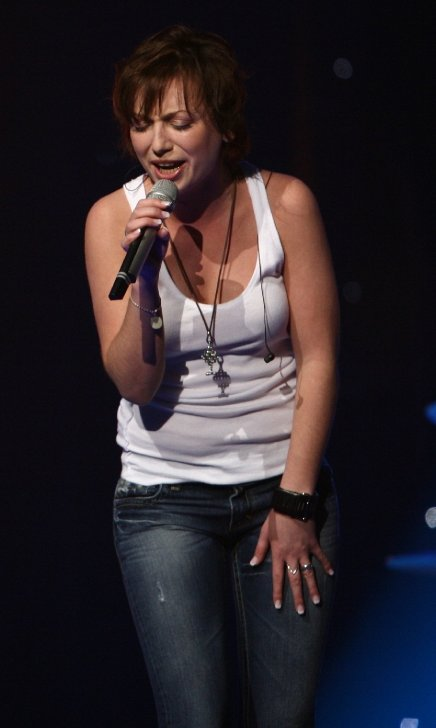
Magdolna Rúzsa performing at Aprócska blues at the 2007 Eurovision Song Contest

In 2007 Veronika Harcsa was awarded as the Best Voice of the Fringe at the Budapest Fringe Festival.

In 2009 Zoli Ádok represented Hungary at the 2009 Eurovision Song Contest with his song Dance With Me. He finished 15th in the semi-final. His first album, Tánclépés was released in 2008, while his second Három álom in 2011.

=== 2010s ===
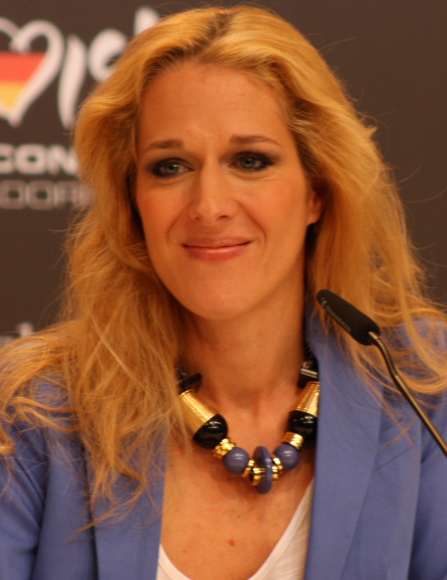
Kati Wolf at the Eurovision Song Contest 2011

In 2010 the Hungarian X-Faktor was aired for the first time on RTL Klub to rival their counterpart TV2. The jury enlisted Feró Nagy, Péter Geszti, Miklós Malek, and Ildikó Keresztes. The talents of the first series included Csaba Vastag, Tibor Kocsis, Kati Wolf and Veca Janicsák.

Kati Wolf represented Hungary at the Eurovision Song Contest 2011 with the song "What About My Dreams?".

In 2011 the band Compact Disco's sophomore record was released entitled II following the debut album Stereoid including the hit song Feel The Rain.

On 24 December 2011, Zsuzsi Mary was found dead in her home in Budapest. She committed suicide on Christmas Eve, aged 64. According to Magyar Távirati Iroda (MTI) her body was found the next day, 25 December 2011. Her suicide was confirmed by her second husband, György Klapka.

In 2012 Compact Disco won the Dal 2012 therefore they represented Hungary at the Eurovision. Their own song, Sound of Our Hearts finished 24th receiving only 19 points. The band became one of the most prominent electro-pop bands in the country along with others such as Carbonfools, Colorstar and Anima Sound System.

The Hungarian Eurovision Song Contest, the A Dal 2013 was won by ByeAlex with his own song, Kedvesem, therefore he represented Hungary at the Eurovision Song Contest 2013 where he placed tenth.

On 11 March 2013, László Bódi, the singer of the pop-rock band Republic, died of heart failure.

András Kállay-Saunders won A Dal 2014 with the song "Running" and represented Hungary in the Eurovision Song Contest 2014 where he placed fifth.

== Hungarian pop bands and artists ==
- Ádok, Zoltán
- Ákos
- Amber Smith
- Back II Black
- Balázs, Pali
- Balázs, Klári
- Bálint, Eszter
- Bayer, Friderika
- Bogi
- Bonanza Banzai
- Bródy, János
- ByeAlex
- Carbonfools, The
- Charlie
- Compact Disco
- Cserháti, Zsuzsa
- Csézy
- Delhusa Gjon
- Demjén, Ferenc
- Dobrády, Ákos
- Éder, Krisztián
- Első Emelet
- Emil.RuleZ!
- EZ Basic
- Fekete Vonat
- Fool Moon
- Geszti, Péter
- Görbe, Nóra
- Harcsa, Veronika
- Heaven Street Seven
- Illés
- Irie Maffia
- Janicsák Veca
- Kállay Saunders
- Kalmár, Pál
- Karády, Katalin
- Karamel
- Karthago
- Kern, András
- Katona, Klári
- Keresztes, Ildikó
- Király, Linda
- Király, Viktor
- Kispál és a Borz
- Kocsis, Tibor
- Kolin, The
- Koncz, Zsuzsa
- Korda, György
- Kovács, Erzsi
- Kovács, Kati
- Kowalsky meg a Vega
- Lokomotiv GT
- Magna Cum Laude
- Máté, Péter
- Mary, Zsuzsi
- MDC
- Metró
- Mikes, Éva
- Moog, The
- Neoton Família
- Nox
- Nguyen Thanh Hien
- Ocho Macho
- Oláh, Ibolya
- Omega
- Pannonia Allstars Ska Orchestra
- Pápai, Joci
- Pélyi, Barna
- Pierrot
- Poniklo, Imre
- Puzzle, The
- Rácz, Vali
- Radics, Gigi
- Rapülők
- Republic
- R-GO
- Rúzsa, Magdolna
- Schmidt, Vera
- Shane54 (aka Előd Császár)
- Supersonic
- Szabó, Szilvia Péter
- Szandi
- Szécsi, Pál
- Szörényi, Levente
- Szulák, Andrea
- Szűcs, Judith
- T.N.T.
- Tolvai, Renáta
- Tóth, Gabriella
- United
- Vanilla, Ágnes
- Vastag Csaba
- V.I.P.
- Vizy, Marton
- Yonderboi
- Žagar
- Zalatnay, Sarolta
- Zámbó, Jimmy
- Zorán

== Notable musicians of Hungarian descent ==
- Báthory, Zoltán
- Báthory-Kitsz, Dennis
- Brolsma, Gary
- Cetera, Peter
- Derakh, Amir
- Gedeon, Géza
- Jarrett, Keith
- Kesha
- Knopfler, Mark
- Lengyel, Theo
- Morissette, Alanis
- Quatro, Suzi
- Ramone, Tommy
- Simmons, Gene
- Simon, Paul
- Sioux, Mariee
- Such, Alec John
- Swizz Beatz
- Szabó, Gábor
- Szakácsi, Gábor
- Téglás, Zoltán

== Hungarian producers ==
- Báthory, Zoltán
- Csicsak, Norbert
- Kasza, Tibor
- Ladanyi, Greg
- Muranyi, Joe
- Ramone, Tommy
- Schram Dávid
- Zoltán Takács

== Hungarian pop records ==
Date	Band	Record	Reviews	Label/Release	Producer(s)
1967	Illés	Ezek A Fiatalok			
1969	Omega	10 000 lépés			
1970	Omega	Éjszakai országút			
1971	Lokomotiv GT	Locomotiv GT			
1972	Lokomotiv GT	Ringasd el magad			
1973	Lokomotiv GT	Bummm!			
1971	Lokomotiv GT	Mindig magasabbra			
1976	Lokomotiv GT	Locomotiv GT V.			
1977	Lokomotiv GT	Zene - Mindenki másképp csinálja			
1978	Lokomotiv GT	Mindenki			
2003	Linda Király	Number 1		King Music Management	Linda Király
2006	Magdolna Rúzsa	Ördögi angyal		CLS Records	Gábor Závodi & Gábor Presser
2007	The Moog	Sold for Tomorrow		MuSick Records	Jack Endino
2007	EZ Basic	Hocus Focus		self-released	Szabolcs Puha
2007	Žagar	Cannot Walk Fly Instead			
2008	Zoli Ádok	Tánclépés			Zoli Ádok
2009	Compact Disco	Stereoid		CLS Music	Compact Disco
2009	The Moog	Razzmatazz Orfeum		MuSick Records	Geoff Ott
2010	EZ Basic	Hello Heavy		Twelvetones Records	George Schilling
2011	Zoli Ádok	Három álom			Zoli Ádok
2011	Compact Disco	II		CLS Music	Compact Disco
2012	The Moog	Seasons in the Underground	Ki kicsoda a magyar zeneéletben? Szerk. Székely András. Bp., Zeneműkiadó, 1979, 1988.; Kiss István Zoltán: Magyar könnyűzenei lexikon 1962-től. Bp., Zaj-Zone, 1998.; Könnyűzenei lexikon. Szerk. Sebők János-Szabó Béla. Bp., Idegenforgalmi Propaganda és Kiadó Vállalat, 1987.; Tardos Péter: Rock lexikon. 2. jav., bőv. kiad. Zeneműkiadó, Bp., 1982.; Zoltán János: Képes pop-rock enciklopédia. [Bp.], Yellow & Blue Kft., 1999.	MuSick Records	Ken Scott

== See also ==
- Hungarian alternative
- Hungarian indie
- Hungarian metal
- Hungarian rock
- Ki mit tud?
- Megasztár
- Táncdalfesztivál
- X-Faktor
