= Klári Katona =

Hungarian singer (born 1953)

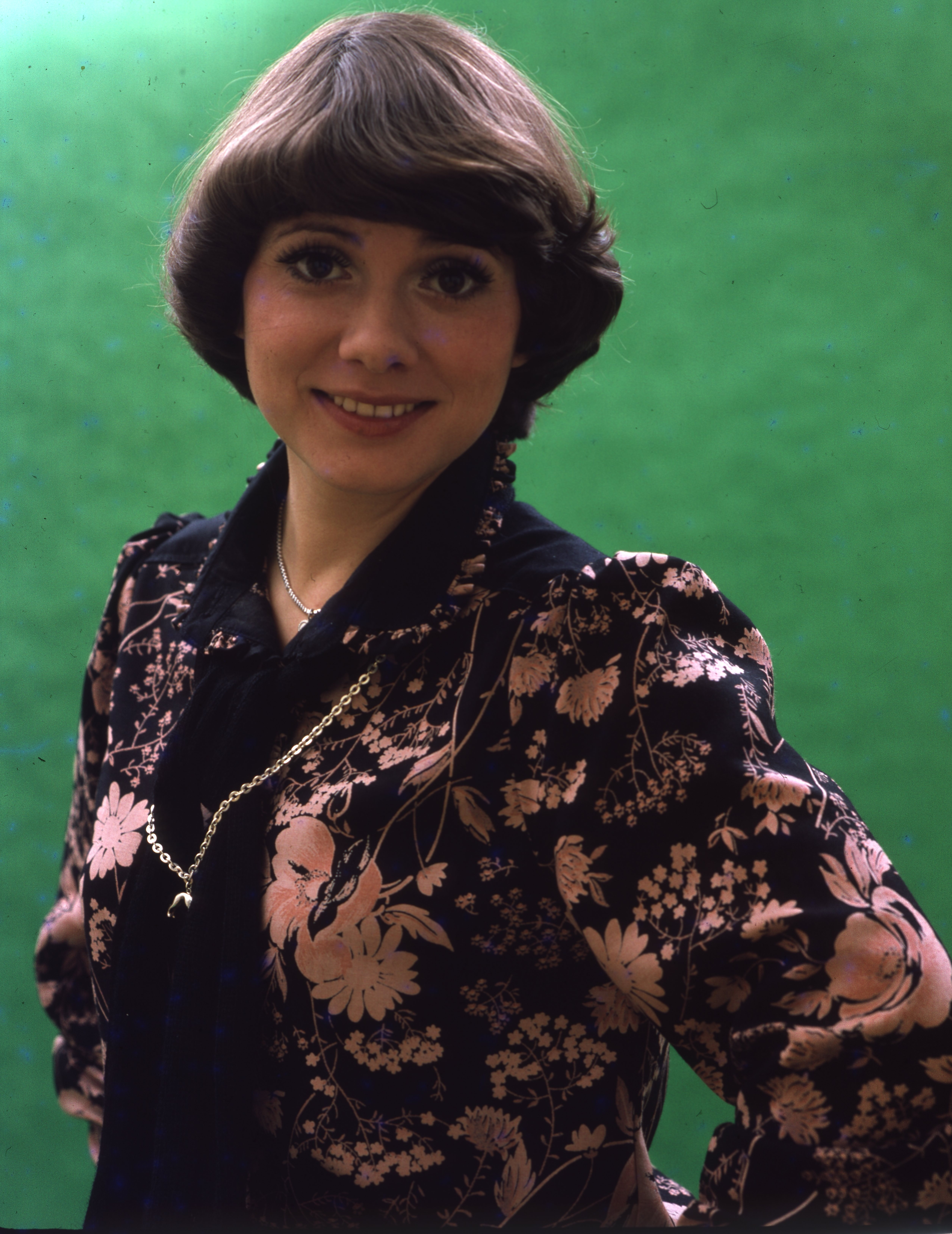
- Katona in 1978

Background information
- Born: 20 October 1953 (age 72); Ráckeve, Hungary
- Genres: Pop; pop rock
- Occupation: Singer
- Instrument: Vocals
- Years active: 1972–present
- Labels: Hungaroton-Pepita; Sony Music; Hungaroton

Klári Katona (born 20 October 1953) is a Hungarian pop singer.

== Career ==
Katona was born on 20 October 1953 in Ráckeve, Hungary. She began singing in 1966, at the age of 13, with her professional career beginning in 1972 after the performance of her song "Bővízű forrás" on the Hungarian television programme Táncdalfesztivál won her an award. She provided vocals for the song "Kék Csillag" by the band Neoton Família, then pursued a solo career. In 1976, she gave concert in Istanbul, Turkey, Palma de Mallorca, Spain, and the musical festival of Sopot in Poland. The year 1977 marked the release of her first studio album, Savanyú a csokoládé backed by Ferenc Demjén and Bergendy.

Her real success came in the 1980s with composer backing of Gábor Presser and Dusán Sztevanovity. She appeared as a host on several Hungarian television channels.

Katona became popular in Cuba after her performance in Havana.

In 1986 she won Magyar Radio's eMeRTon-díj best singer award.

In 1995, she received the Order of the Hungarian Republic Small Cross.

== Discography ==
- Savanyú a csokoládé (1977, lit. "the chocolate is sour")
- Láthatod: Boldog vagyok (1978, lit. "you can see: I'm happy")
- Titkaim (1981, lit. "my secrets")
- IV. (1984, untitled)
- Éjszakai üzenet (1986, lit."night message")
- Mozi (1989, lit."cinema")
- ...Neked (1992, lit. "for you")
- Fekete gyöngy (1996, lit. "black pearl")
- Most (2001, lit. "now")
- Ünnep (2002, lit. "holiday")
- Éjszakai üzenet (2004, lit. "night message")

== See also ==
- Hungarian pop

== Sources ==
- "Biography on the Hungarian Musical Database" (in Hungarian). Archived from the original on 2007-10-31.
