= Zsuzsi Mary =

Hungarian singer

- Born: 13 October 1947; Szeged, Hungary
- Died: 24 December 2011 (aged 64) Budapest, Hungary
- Genres: Pop
- Occupation: Singer
- Years active: 1965–2011
- Label: Hungaroton

Zsuzsa Mary also known as Zsuzsi Mary (Born Zsuzsanna Mary; 13 October 1947 – 24 December 2011) was a Hungarian pop singer.

== Career ==
She appeared first time on stage in 1965, later she finished on the first place in the Hungarian Television's song contest, the Táncdalfesztivál, with the song "Mama" (Mom) in 1968. The songwriter was Attila Dobos, who would be her first husband. She was successful in the Eastern Bloc countries too. In 1969, she married György Klapka, and soon after emigrated with her husband. They divorced in 1987, but maintained a good relationship. She returned to Hungary after the end of Communism. Mary came out as bisexual in 2008.

== Death ==
She committed suicide on Christmas Eve, 2011, aged 64. According to Magyar Távirati Iroda (MTI), her body was found the next day, 25 December 2011. Her suicide was confirmed by her second husband, György Klapka.

== Albums ==
- 1991 – Ez az utolsó tangó (This is the last tango)
- 2002 – Premier M (My premier)
- 2005 – Sodor a szél (Drifting in the wind)

== Posthumous releases ==
26 December, 2011 – Elszálltaka az évek (CD Single) (Vanished over the years)

It's as if this song would have been written to say goodbye.
The refrain:

"Flew off over the years
They do not hurt the silence
The tranquility locking arms
So rock out"

== See also ==
- Hungarian pop

== Sources ==
- Mary Zsuzsi profile at allmusic.hu-n (in Hungarian)
- Videó: 1968-as Táncdalfesztivál – Mama on YouTube
- Videó: Trombitás on YouTube
