= Jimmy Zámbó =

Hungarian singer (1958–2001)

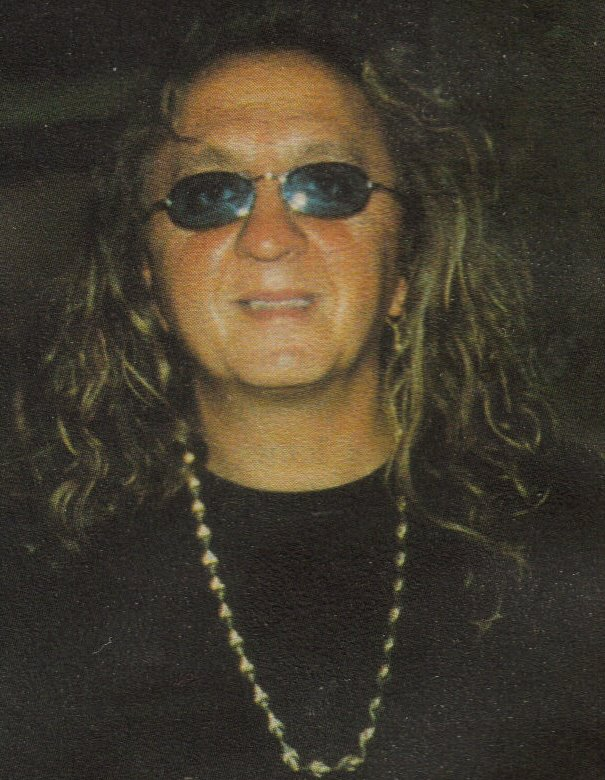
- Born: Imre Zámbó; 20 January 1958; Budapest, Hungary
- Died: 2 January 2001 (aged 42); Budapest, Hungary
- Resting place: Csepel graveyard
- Occupation: Singer
- Years active: 1987–2001
- Spouse: Edit Zámbó
- Children: 3

Jimmy Zámbó (born Imre Zámbó, 20 January 1958 – 2 January 2001) was a Hungarian pop singer. His nickname was "The King".

== Career ==
Zámbó started his singing career in the Hungarian State Radio Children's Choir. His breakthrough came in the early 1990s, when he was voted Hungary's singer of the year in 1993. His 2000 album Christmas With Jimmy had been Hungary's top-selling record for many weeks before his death. All his albums have gone platinum. Between March 2000 and his death he hosted his own popular show on commercial TV station RTL.

== Death ==
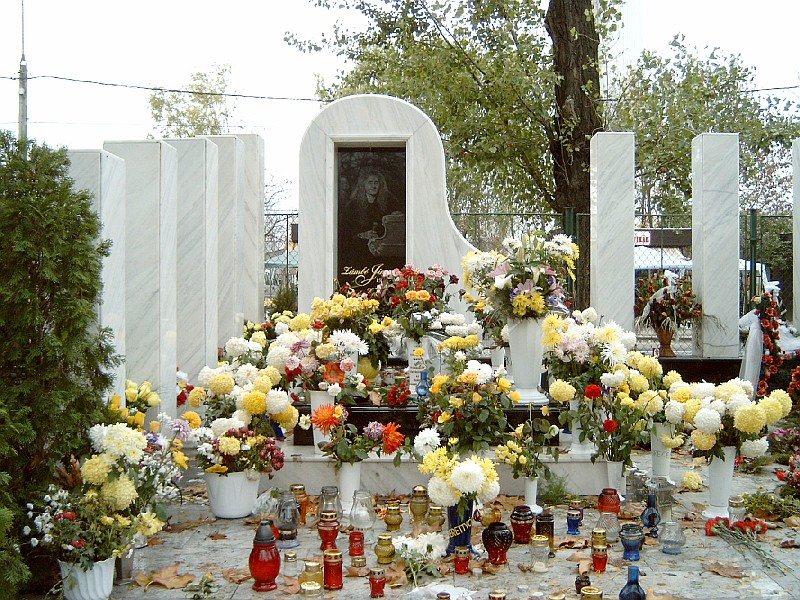
Jimmy Zámbó's tomb in Budapest, Csepel cemetery

Zámbó died on 2 January 2001, by a single gunshot wound to the head. Budapest police said that he leaned out of a window and fired two shots from his 9 mm Beretta at a neighbor's rooster whose crowing was disturbing his sleep, in an effort to scare it away. Then, to show his wife that there were no more rounds left in the gun, he removed the magazine, put it to his head and pulled the trigger. However, neglecting the round left in the chamber, which fired and struck him in the temple. He was taken to the hospital, where he died hours later. He had consumed alcohol, though not an excessive amount. No drugs were found in his body. It was ruled as an accidental death.

== See also ==
- Hungarian pop
- List of unusual deaths in the 21st century
