= Fecó Balázs =

Hungarian musician (1951–2020)

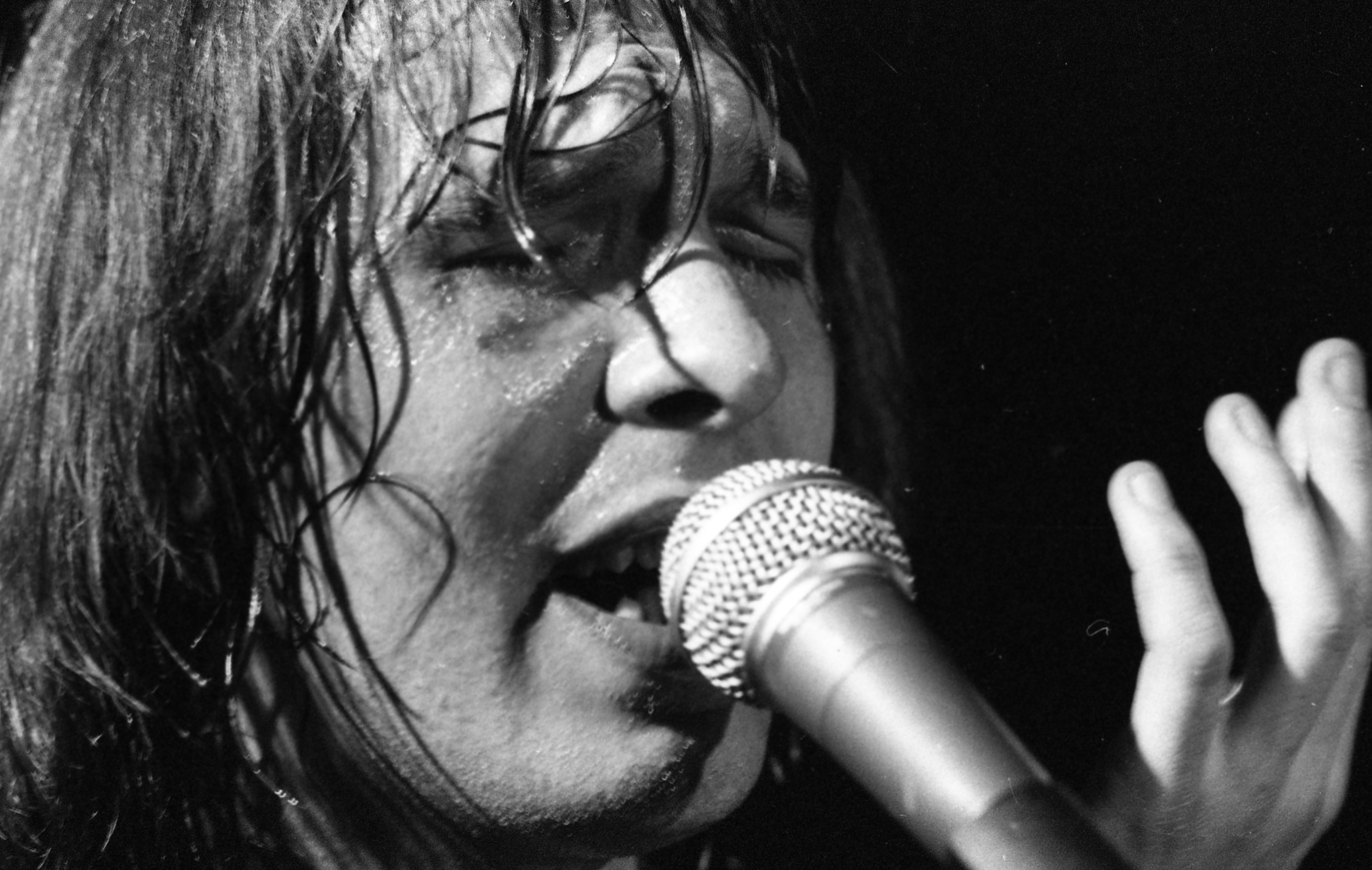
Fecó in 1981

Fecó Balázs (born Ferenc Balázs; Budapest, 2 March 1951 – 26 November 2020) was a Hungarian singer, songwriter, and keyboardist and the founder of popular Hungarian rock band Korál.

== Biography ==
Balázs was born in Budapest and attended a music high school in his hometown. He created an orchestra already while learning, and in 1967 he joined the pop band Neoton Família (then simply called Neoton). In 1972 he left Neoton and co-founded the band Taurus EX-T 25 75 82, Hungary's first hard rock band and one of the country's first supergroups as its keyboardist and singer. After releasing two singles and unable to convince record label Hungaroton to record an album, Taurus broke up in 1973 and Balázs spent two years abroad. He returned to Hungary in 1976 and joined the backing band of singer Zsuzsa Koncz. In 1978 he founded the rock band Korál, which became one of Hungary's most popular rock bands in the 1980s and toured abroad in Bulgaria, Yugoslavia and the Soviet Union. In 1981 he wrote and sang on the band's biggest hit Homok a szélben, which reached 3rd place on that year's Táncdalfesztivál. In 1986 Korál broke up and Balázs started a solo career as a singer and songwriter. In 2008 he won the Hungarian Music Awards, and in 2016 he was awarded the Kossuth Prize.

In August 2020, Balázs began a new tour through Hungary, but on 18 November, during the COVID-19 pandemic, he was hospitalized and was in a serious condition due to COVID-19. He died from the disease on 26 November 2020, aged 69.
