= Péter Máté =

Hungarian pop singer (1947–1984)

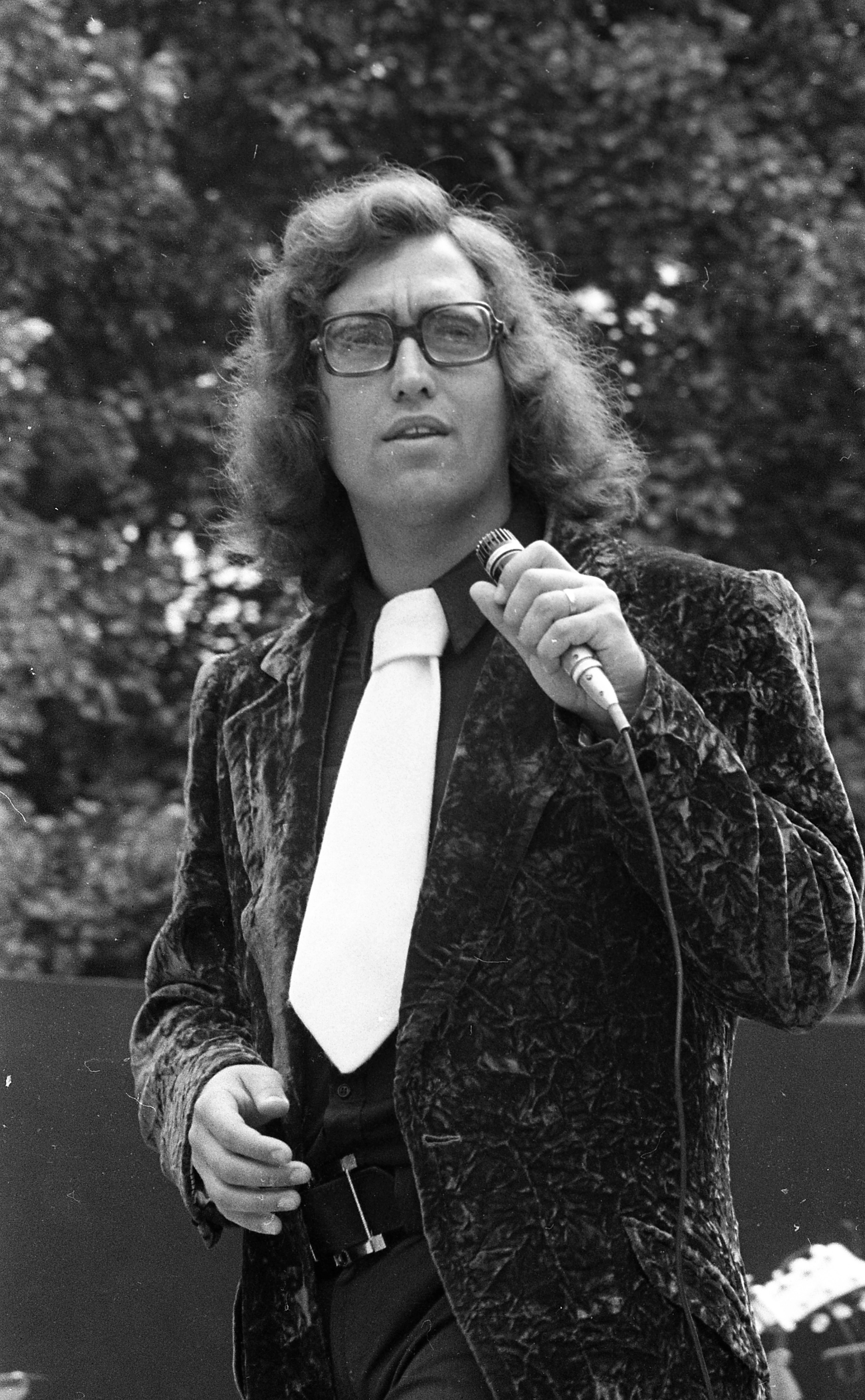
- Máté in 1973
- Born: 4 February 1947; Budapest, Hungary
- Died: 9 September 1984 (aged 37); Budapest, Hungary
- Occupations: singer, composer, pianist
- Years active: 1965-1984

Péter Máté (4 February 1947 – 9 September 1984) was a Hungarian pop singer, composer, and pianist. He was the composer and performer of nearly 150 songs, achieving cult status in Hungarian pop music.

== Career ==
Péter Máté was born on 4 February 1947 in Budapest. He learned singing, playing piano and guitar from age 6 with a private teacher, and from 14, in a school of music. Discovering his talent and wide-spectrum voice, he was taught by known figures like composer György Geszler and András Bágya. He gained a wide spectrum of musical knowledge, which allowed him to write, compose, score and play his own music all by himself. These skills proved to be important in gaining his later fame.

After some years in a runner-up band from 1965, he made his first recordings at the Magyar Rádió in 1965, including Úgy várom hogy jössz-e már?, and Mondd már, in cooperation with Illés. The two songs, and his first prize at the largest pol-beat festival of the Eastern Bloc in Sochi made him well known in the region. Several awards on festivals followed, notably in Cuba, Canada, Germany and Ireland. Besides pop music, he also scored musicals (including the Hungarian version of Jesus Christ Superstar), and wrote theatrical background music.

The ongoing popularity came with a change of lifestyle, including heavy smoking and alcohol, habits his weak heart could not bear. He died of cardiac seizure on 9 September 1984, aged 37. He was buried in the Farkasréti Cemetery in Budapest, an event that was attended by tens of thousands of mourning fans.

== Discography ==
=== Albums ===
- Éjszakák és nappalok (1976)
- Magány és együttlét (1978)
- Szívhangok (1980)
- Keretek között (1982)

=== Compilations, concert recordings and demos ===
- Elmegyek (1984)
- Vagy mindent, vagy semmit (1985)
- Egy darabot a szívemből (1989)
- Emlékezz rám - In Memoriam Máté Péter (1994)
- Mondd, miért szeretsz te mást (1996)
- Rock koncertek az MR archívumából (1997)
- Rock and rablás (1997)
- Játszd el, hogy újra élsz (1998)
- A magyar tánczene csillagai (1999)
- Mondd, miért szeretsz Te mást? (1999)
- Adhatok még… (2000)
- Vallomások 2001)
- Hogyha én lennék a fény (2003)
- Emlékezz rám (2006)
- Mondd, miért szeretsz te mást (2006)
- Egy darabot a szívemből (2006)
- Álmodj csak világ (2006)
- Álomi táj (2007)

== See also ==
- Hungarian pop

== Sources ==
- László, Markó. Új Magyar Életrajzi Lexikon. Budapest: Arcanum, 2001. ISBN 978-963-547-549-0.
- Péter Máté on the online beat-pop-rock lexicon
