= Ferenc Demjén =

Hungarian rock singer (born 1946)

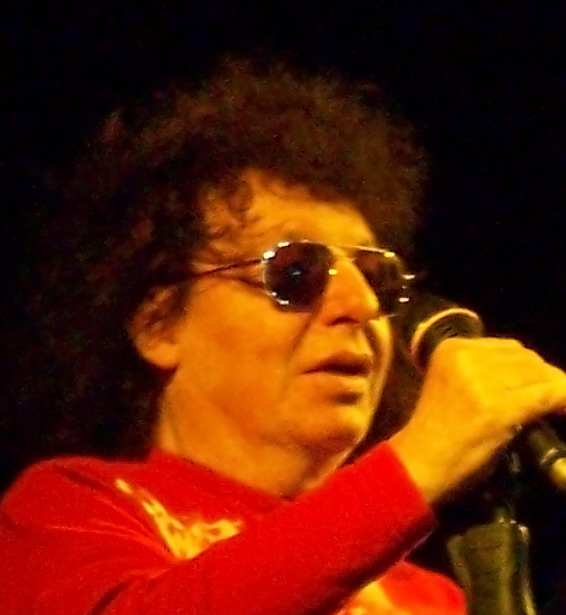
- Demjén performing in Békés, 2007

Background information
- Born: 21 December 1946 (age 79); Diósgyőr, Hungary
- Genres: Rock; hard rock; beat; new wave
- Occupations: Singer; songwriter; bassist
- Instruments: Vocals; bass guitar
- Years active: 1965–present
- Formerly of: Bergendy; V'Moto-Rock

Ferenc Demjén (born 21 December 1946) is a Hungarian rock and pop singer, songwriter and bassist. Besides a solo career, he was the member of bands Bergendy and V'Moto-Rock, and played an important part in the rock culture of the country, contributing to nearly 150 albums.

== Career ==
Ferenc Demjén was born on 21 December 1946 in Diósgyőr. His father was an engineer at the Diósgyőr Steel Company, and after he was fired because of political reasons, the family moved to Budapest, where he later became chief engineer in one of the state ministries. Demjén, who graduated as a chemist technician, was inspired by his fathers singing talent, and started to study music, largely on his own.

After starting as a bassist in bands Számum, Liversing, Dogs, Meteor, Sakk-Matt, Tűzkerék and Szabadság Szálló Kulcsár, he met István Bergendy in 1970, who invited him to play in his band. He debuted as a songwriter with "Jöjj vissza vándor", scoring his first success, resulting in weekly performances in the popular E-Klub and Ifjúsági Park. They gained country-wide popularity by performing in the National Television's show at New Year's Eve in 1970. Their first open concert was in 1971 in the Kisstadion stadium. In 1972 they won second place in the year's Táncdalfesztivál with the song "Úgy Szeretném".

Demjén left the band in 1977 and released his first solo album while forming the successful band V'Moto-Rock in the same year. He worked with Klári Katona and Kati Kovács on their first studio albums. His song for the film Szerelem első vérig (1987) topped the Hungarian charts for 8 months. After V'Moto-Rock disbanded in 1988, Demjén began a solo career, releasing an album almost every year in the 1990s.

In 1988, while traveling in the US, he met Rebecca at the Hard Rock Cafe in New York City. They began traveling together and soon married.

He received the Order of the Hungarian Republic, Officer's rank in 1996.

== Solo discography ==
- Fújom a dalt (1977)
- A szabadság vándora (1989)
- Elveszett gyémántok (1990)
- A föld a szeretőm (1991)
- Demjén Ferenc & Sztárvendégei (live album) (1992)
- Demjén –Hat (1993)
- Dalok a szerelemről (1994)
- Nekem 8 (1994)
- Félszáz év (1996)
- Ünnep '96 (live album) (1996)
- Best of Demjén (compilation album) (1997)
- Ezzel még tartozom (1997)
- Demjén 13 (1998)
- 2000 éves álmok (1999)
- Álmok, Csodák, Szerelmek (2001)
- Hívlak (2003)
- Aréna 2004.12.30 (live album) (2005)
- Demjén60 (2006)
- A lelkünk most is vágtat (2009)
- Így fogadj el igazán (2010)
- Túl a világvégén (2013)
- Még lázad a szív (2018)

== See also ==
- Hungarian pop

== Sources ==
- – Biography at Dunántúli Napló Online
- – Biography az Zene.hu
