= Éva Mikes =

Hungarian singer

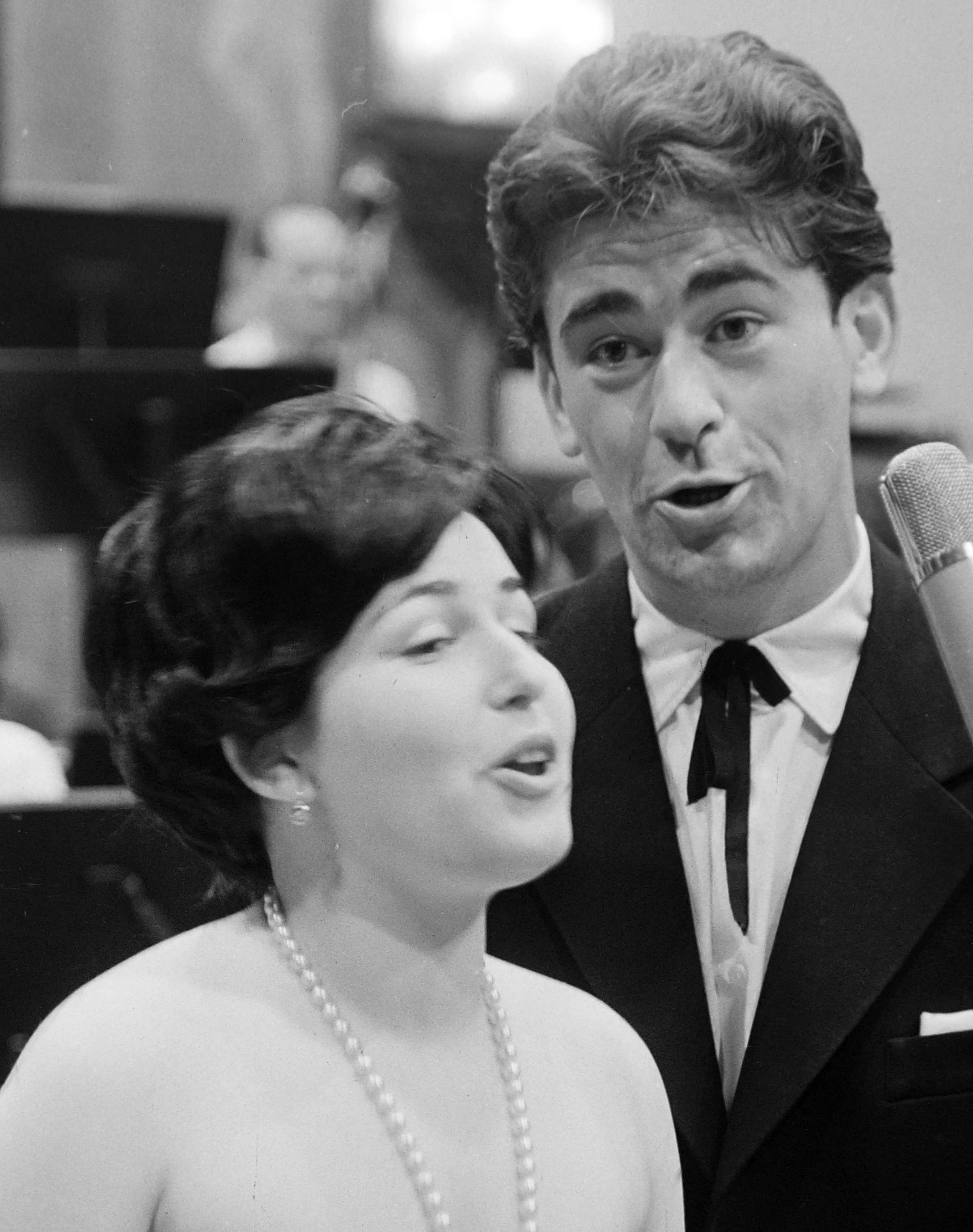
- Éva with János Koós in the Hungarian Radio studio (1971)

Background information
- Born: Éva Misics; December 22, 1938; Budapest, Kingdom of Hungary
- Died: February 5, 1986 (aged 47) Budapest, Hungarian People's Republic
- Occupation: Singer
- Instrument: Vocals

Éva Mikes (22 December 1938. Budapest – 5 February 1986 Budapest.) was a Hungarian pop singer, who rose to fame during the 1960s.

== Biography ==
Mikes started her music career at the late 1950s at the studio of the Magyar Rádió. Her characteristic voice and tender style made her quickly known throughout the country, along with singers like János Koós or Katalin Sárosi. Best known for her lyrical, romantic songs, she scored the first place in the very first Hungarian Top Hit Chart - published in Ifjúsági Magazin (Magazine for the Young People) in 1965 with her song Te szeress legalább.

She was also popular in other Eastern countries, such as the Soviet Union and Poland (appearing on the Sopot International Song Festival). After the local success of beat music classical pop lost popularity, and she decided to retire. In 1973, after her daughter born, she left the stage and worked as a music teacher. Éva Mikes died in 1986 after battling with cancer.

== Notable singles ==
- Ahogy mentem az utcán (1961)
- Jó az álmodozás (1962)
- Ami szívemen a számon (1964)
- Egy kicsi szerencse (1965)
- Első szerelem (1965)
- Engem nem lehet elfelejteni (1965)
- Esős vasárnap délután (1965)
- Te szeress legalább (1965)
- Nem fogok szomorkodni érted (1967)

== See also ==
- Hungarian pop

== Sources ==
- - Éva Mikes in the Hungarian Biographical Lexicon (Ágnes Kenyeres. Magyar Életrajzi Lexikon. Budapest: Akadémiai Kiadó, 1994. 9789630524971), freely available on mek.niif.hu
