= Vera Schmidt =

Hungarian pop singer-songwriter (born 1982)

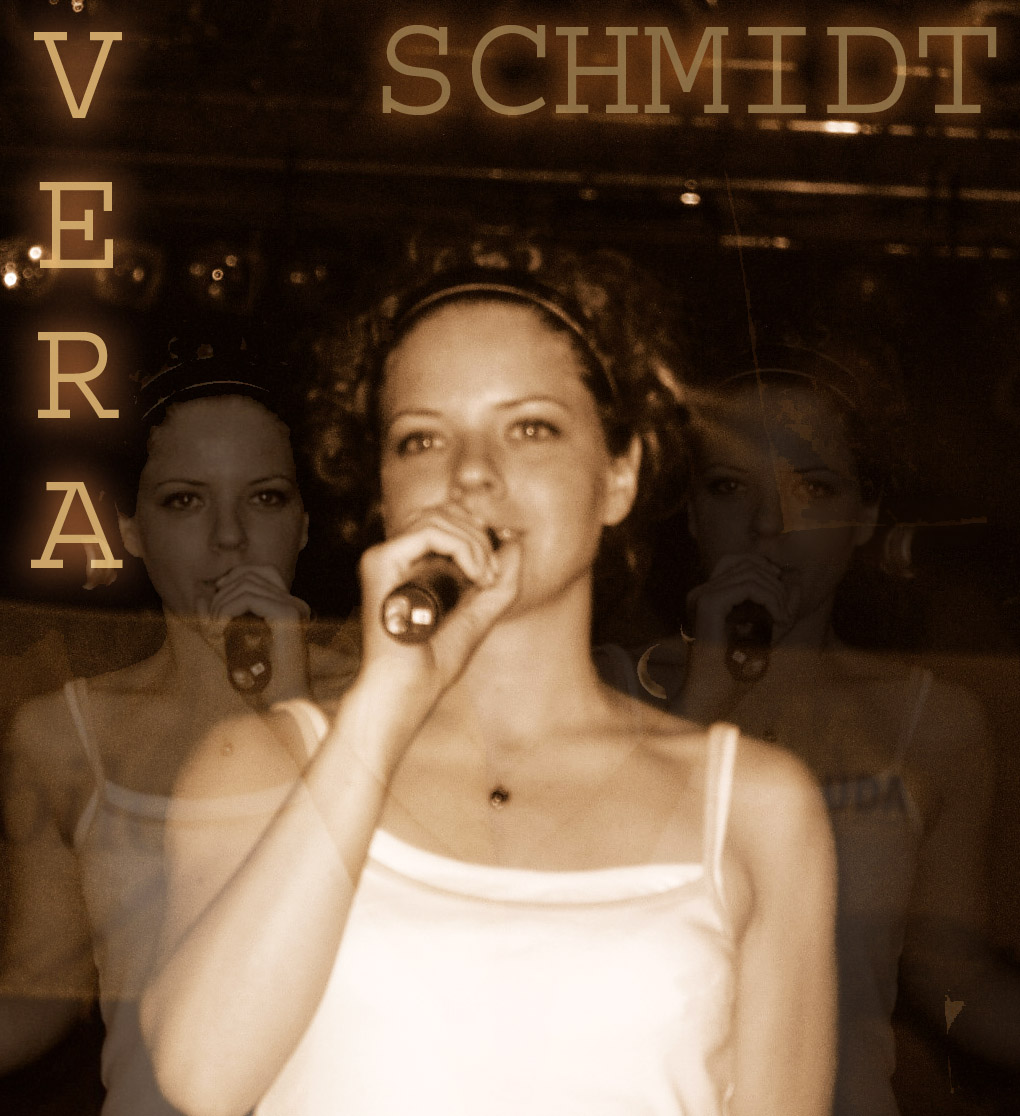
- Vera Schmidt performing in 2004
- Born: 4 May 1982 (age 44); Miskolc, Hungary
- Occupation: singer-songwriter
- Years active: 2003–

Veronika "Vera" Schmidt (4 May 1982) is a Hungarian pop singer-songwriter who rose to popularity after finishing fifth in the Hungarian version of Pop Idol Megasztár. She is a student in Eötvös Loránd University, Budapest.

== Biography ==
=== Early life ===
Vera Schmidt was born in Miskolc. Her father taught her to play the guitar. After that, she and her sister often performed in school programs. After graduating from Ferenc Földes Secondary School, she formed her first rock band. They often played in Miskolc and other cities around Miskolc.

== Discography ==
=== Albums ===
1. Megasztár (2004)
2. Best Of Megasztár (2004)
3. Nézhetnélek (2005)

When Vera Schmidt worked on own album, Jamie Wichester and Róbert Hrutka helped her.

== Pop Idol Performances ==
Top 11: "Nézhetnélek" by Vera Schmidt
Top 11: "Csillagdal" by Pierrot
Top 10: "Kiss from a Rose" by Seal
Top 9: "Norwegian Wood (This Bird Has Flown)" by the Beatles
Top 9: "Let It Be" by the Beatles
Top 8: "You'll Be in My Heart" by Phil Collins
Top 8: "We Have All the Time in the World" by Louis Armstrong
Top 7: "I Still Haven't Found What I'm Looking For" by U2
Top 7: "We are the World" written by Michael Jackson and Lionel Richie
Top 6: "Thank You" by Dido
Top 5: "Minden szónál többet ér egy dal" by Peter Máté
Top 5: "Várj, míg felkel majd a nap" by Ferenc Demjén
Top 5: "Egyszer véget ér..." by Peter Máté
Top 5: "Fújom a dalt" by Peter Máté
Top 4: "Somethin' Stupid" by Robbie Williams and Nicole Kidman
Top 4: "Another Day in Paradise" by Phil Collins

Other performances in Pop Idol finale and tour:

1. "Sweet Dreams" by Patsy Cline
2. "It's Your Life" by Jamie Winchester

== Vera Schmidt's band ==
The Vera Schmidt's band members: Vera Schmidt: singing and guitar, Zoltán Tóth: keyboard, Gergő Juhász: bass, Máté Hámori: guitars, Ákos Kottler : drums.

== The first album "Nézhetnélek" songs ==
1. Ébredésre
2. Ne bántsd őt
3. Süvít a szél
4. Késői találkozás
5. Nézhetnélek
6. Írj nekem egy dalt
7. Életem szerelme
8. Szeretsz és féltesz
9. Valaki hitesse el
10. Ne veszítsd el
11. Vízcseppek

== Tours ==
- Pop Idol Arena Tour 2004

== See also ==
- Hungarian pop
