= Pál Szécsi =

Hungarian singer (1944–1974)

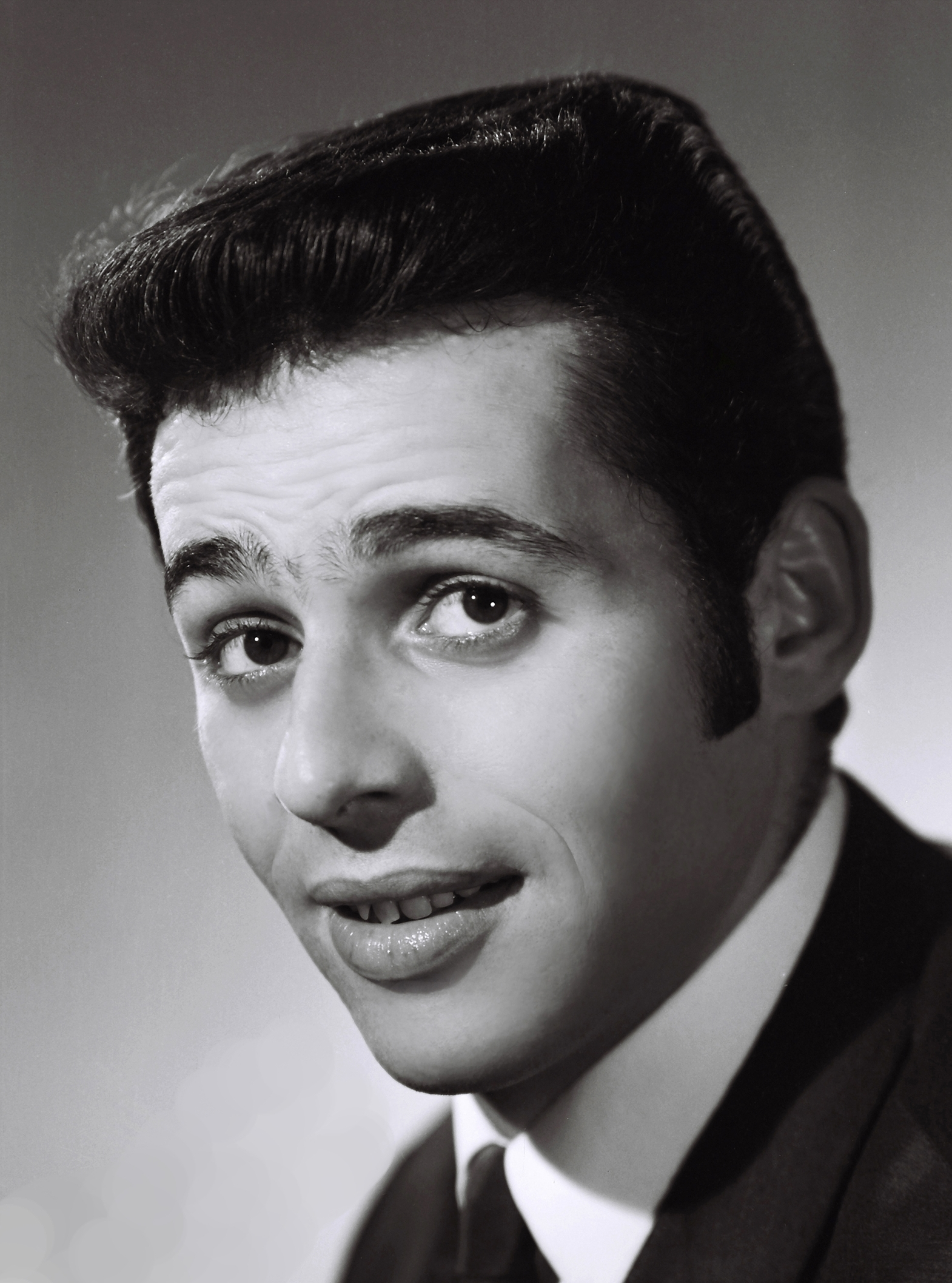
- Born: March 19, 1944; Budapest, Hungary
- Died: April 30, 1974 (aged 30); Budapest, Hungary
- Occupations: singer, actor
- Years active: 1965–1974

Pál Szécsi (19 March 1944 – 30 April 1974) was a Hungarian pop singer, one of the most popular of all time, who achieved unprecedented cult status during his lifetime.

== Biography ==
Pál Szécsi was born on 19 March 1944 in Budapest. His father Ferenc Szécsi, a professor of linguistics, was shot in the last months of World War II. His mother gave one-year-old Szécsi and his two siblings to foster parents, and during the Revolution of 1956, fled the country for the United States through Austria. She traveled with Szécsi's older sister until the train station of Vienna, but she left her there, eventually leaving Kati and Pál in Hungary. These events later resulted in serious psychological illness and nerve problems for Szécsi as he grew up.

The orphaned boy was taken into state care, where he remained until age 16. After leaving, he worked as a laborer at several places, until at a workplace meeting, his engaging style and motion were taken notice of by the assembled members. Inspired by this, Szécsi became a model and quickly became quite successful. At New Year's Eve, 1965 he took part in a fashion show organized in Hotel Gellért. After the event, he went into the hotel bar and sang three songs. Soon afterward, through the efforts of one of the patrons of the bar, Szécsi was introduced to Júlia Benk who would become his singing teacher and under whose tutelage Szécsi would begin his professional career. In consulting Benk, László Bánki (a talent-scout working at the National Television in search of young talent for the upcoming Táncdalfesztivál) was recommended Benk's favorite student, Szécsi. Invited to perform at the festival, Szécsi sang Csak egy tánc volt at the show and this performance lifted him into immediate popularity, becoming a household name in the country.

His success was further established through his creation of covers for Italian pop songs like Sergio Endrigo's L' arca di Noe which became Kósza szél. Trying to gain international fame, Szécsi also produced an album released in Germany under the name Paul Moro, but it was unsuccessful. Szécsi's growing domestic popularity was increasingly harder to bear for the mentally fragile singer, and this coupled with severe alcoholism and several failures in private life - including the suicide of one of his loves, actress Edit Domján - led to Szécsi becoming more and more closed off from the outer world. He attempted suicide eight times, but always asked for help at the last minute. His ninth attempt on 30 April 1974, was successful. Szécsi was 30 years old. He was buried in the Farkasréti Cemetery in Budapest. His burial turned into a hysterical scandal with hundreds of fans, maddened by the pain of loss, trying to rush to his catafalque.

== Legacy ==
His death shocked the masses of fans, creating legends, myths, and conspiracy theories immediately after his death. The play Szécsi Pál szerelmei was written to his memory, describing his six loves, framed by six suicide attempts, featuring seventeen of his songs. The Szécsi Pál award, founded by his relatives is handed out every year starting from 2007.

== Discography ==
- Hagyjuk szívem (1971)
- Egy szál harangvirág (1973)
- Violák (1976)
- Felettünk az ég (1983)
- Egy szép régi dal (1985)
- Csak egy tánc volt (compilation) (1988)
- Tárd ki ablakod (compilation) (1989)
- Mint a violák (compilation) (1992)
- Két összeillő ember (compilation) (1992)
- Ha álmodni tudnál (compilation) (2003)

== See also ==
- Hungarian pop

== Sources ==
- Biography at Rnr media
- Szécsi Pál Szerelmei at Mistral Agency
