= Márton Vizy =

Marton Vizy
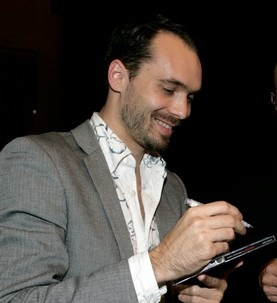

Background information
- Born: Marton Vizy; 2 December 1977 (age 48); Budapest, Hungary.
- Genres: Pop, pop rock
- Occupations: Singer-songwriter, musical composer, record producer
- Instruments: Vocals, piano, guitar, keyboard
- Years active: 2002–present
- Label: Mirrorstage Productions
- Website: www.mirrorstageproductions.com

Marton Vizy (born 2 December 1977) is a Hungarian pop singer-songwriter, musical composer from Budapest, Hungary. Marton is the composer of the Hungarian hit musical Én, József Attila (Me, Attila József), which performed at the Madach Theatre, Budapest.

== Early life ==
Marton Vizy was born in Budapest, Hungary into a large lower middle class family (he has 8 siblings). He grew up at Kodály Circle (on Andrassy Avenue) in the house where the famous music composer Zoltán Kodály lived. Half of his mother’s family live in the United States, they emigrated during the second world war. Marton is the second son of psychologist Zsuzsanna Kovacs and photographer Zsigmond Vizy. Marton’s relationship with music began at the age of 7 when his grandfather bought a piano for the family. Marton started to explore the instrument for his own joy and by listening to the radio he basically self-taught himself. During his teenage years he learnt playing guitar as well and later took the instrument with him to Oxford, England where he spent a year in 2000.

== Music career ==
=== 2002–03: First hits ===
Returning from England, during the spring of 2002 he composed the famous song „Örvendj Magyarország” (a celebration song for Hungary) to tribute the changes of the political system in the early 1990s (the fall of communism and the rise of democracy). The song’s success was immediate and profound: within a few weeks it was downloaded by hundreds of thousands of people and the song was featured on political rallies before the general elections. As Marton describes: “Literally, from one day to the next I found myself on the big stage in front of huge crowds singing my pop hymn together with the most famous Hungarian actors, artists. All that happened simply overnight.” Half a year later, the song was released on CD and became a best-selling album in a few months time. Soon after this, Marton was asked to write music for the best-selling Hungarian band, Nox. The song “Fire Dance” became one of the band’s most popular songs in 2003. The CD reached the Hungarian double platinum status (60,000 copies) within three month, which was absolutely unique.

=== 2005: Fire Fragments ===
The first studio album. Marton commemorated the 100th year anniversary of the birth of the famous Hungarian poet, Attila József, setting his poems to music. The album - the first of its kind that uses modern mainstream musical solutions in the style of the arrangement - received the title “Fire Fragments”. “I decided to set the poems to music in a very modern way as if they were pop song lyrics. I was very proud of the result because this was the first time when I set a text to music and not the other way around.”

=== 2006–09: Making the musical ===
The album Fire Fragments inspired David Agoston Tóth (musical co-author) – upon purchasing and hearing it in 2006 – to propose to Marton to write a musical based on Attila József’s mysterious life. They started working together soon.

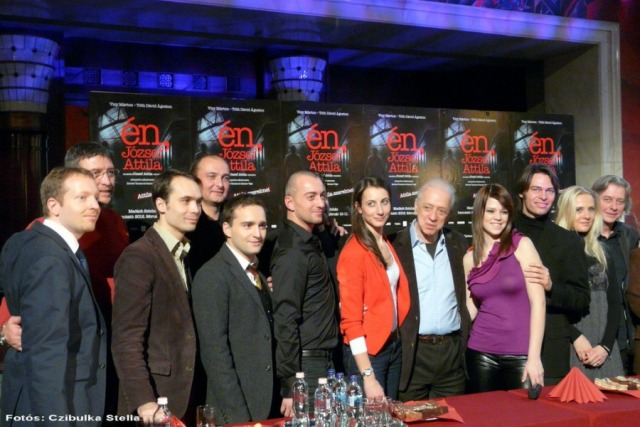
Press conference in 2011

In 2009, Madách Theatre (one of Europe’s leading musical theatres in Budapest) announced a contest for new musicals. David and Marton submitted their play and - passing through more than 100 qualifiers - got into the final of the competition. The director of the Theatre, Tamás Szirtes, liked the play and didn’t hesitate to put it on the grand stage.

=== 2010–present: Me, Attila Jozsef - Madach Theatre, Budapest ===
Madach Theatre presented "Me, Attila Jozsef" right after such blockbuster musicals like "The Phantom of the Opera", "Cats" or "Producers". The Musical rehearsals started in 2011. The piece was premiered on 10 February 2012 and it was an immediate success. The audience fell in love with the piece and its fame quickly spread. Tickets were sold 2–3 months in advance for every show. The Hungarian National Television requested a recording of the performance immediately: the show will be aired nationwide on 29 December 2012. The subsequent album containing the musical numbers was released in October 2012.

As of November 2012 Marton is working on new songs and album for release, and also, along with David, is working on a new musical project.

== See also ==
- Hungarian pop
