= Krisztián Éder =

Krisztián Éder SP
- Birth name: Krisztián Éder
- Also known as: SP
- Born: November 30, 1988 (age 36)
- Origin: Sopron, Hungary
- Genres: R&B, Pop, Rap, Hip hop
- Occupation(s): Singer, songwriter, photographer, director
- Years active: 2005–present
- Website: http://www.krisztianeder.com/

Krisztián Éder (also known by the stage name SP) is a Hungarian photographer based in New York.

== Music career ==
Éder formed the band Helyszínelők with several friends. The group released a single and also had a few live appearances, but ceased to exist in 2005.

Éder started a solo career after the dissolution of Hélyszínelők. In 2006 he released a 6-song EP entitled Srác a szomszéd házból (Boy Next Door) and also, over the Internet, a low-budget music video for the single "Kérlek hogy" ("Please"). This song was Éder's breakthrough.

After this, he released his first album, Kölyök (Kid). It contains 13 songs, which are named for people who worked on them, such as Siska Finuccsi and FankaDeli. His second Internet music video was from this album, for the song "Holnaptól" ("From Tomorrow").

At the end of 2007, Éder was voted the best new hip-hop artist of the year, a big acknowledgement for the young rapper. Later he placed third in the Right Hip-Hop Jam, organized by the Animal Cannibals. For this he was admitted into an "underground" recording company, Mideastouch Crew, joining such artists as Pixa, the Hősök and Fluor Filigran. Pixa produced his second album, Standard, which he finished in June 2008.

His first single and music video, "Állj meg" ("Stop"), was the first of Éder's music to be shown on Hungarian musical channels. The song was so successful that it placed second on the VIVA TV hit list. The album received exceptionally good reviews from domestic newspapers and Web magazines.

After the success of "Állj meg", several commercial recording companies were interested in having him sign a contract with them, but he chose to sign with the new, independent Bedlam Records, headed by Gergely Papp and representing such artists as Pixa, Deeja, Papa Jo, Hybrid and V.S.O.P.

His second single, "Kérlek hogy" ("Please"), had a second, restored version, which debuted with the title "Kérlek hogy II" ("Please II") October 2, 2008, on VIVA TV.

On June 4, 2009, Éder made history on VIVA Comet when he won both the awards he was nominated for (Best New Performer, Best Male Performer). Before this, neither a single performer nor a group had been this successful. Afterwards, Éder signed with Gold Records.

On August 29, 2009, the first single and accompanying music video from Éder's third album appeared, titled "Kép Maradsz" ("You Remain a Picture"), which rapidly topped the VIVA chart.

Éder's third album was released on his 21st birthday, November 30, 2009. Entitled Special, it made it onto the MAHASZ album selling list. Unlike his other albums, which were considered rap, his style on Special is more dance/pop. Another change from his former format is that there is only one duet, in contrast to past albums that had several collaborations. The sole duet is with R&B singer Hien, known for her participation in the fourth season of Megasztár.

== Discography ==
=== Albums ===
| Year | Album title | Highest rank |
| Year | Album title | MAHASZ Top 40 album and compilation |
|---|---|---|
| 2006 | Srác a szomszéd házból: EP; Megjelenés: 2006 | |
| 2007 | Kölyök: studio album; Megjelenés:2007 | |
| 2008 | Standard: studio album; Megjelenés: 2008 | |
| 2009 | Special: studio album; Megjelenés: 2009 | 11 |

=== Music videos ===
- 2006 – Kérlek hogy
- 2007 – Holnaptól
- 2008 – Állj meg
- 2008 – Kérlek hogy II
- 2009 – Kép maradsz
- 2010 – Ne Add Fel /Take Me Back
- 2010 – Más volt
- 2010 – Szólj rám
- 2011 – Nevem SP
- 2011 – Szeretlek

==== Chart positions ====
| Year | From | Highest rank | | | | | Album |
| Year | From | VIVA Chart | MAHASZ Editors' Choice | MAHASZ Rádiós Top 40 | MAHASZ Dance Top 40 | EURO 200 | Album |
|---|---|---|---|---|---|---|---|
| 2008 | Állj meg | 2 | | | | | Standard |
| 2008 | Kérlek hogy II | 14 | | | | | Standard |
| 2009 | Kép maradsz | 1 | | | | | Special |
| 2010 | Ne Add Fel/Take Me Back | 1 | | | | | |

== Photography ==
In 2012, he received his degree in Photography at Moholy-Nagy University of Art and Design in Budapest.

In 2012, he had his first solo exhibition, entitled "Mainstream", and in 2014, he received the "Best Fashion Photographer of the Year" award in Hungary. In 2015, he organized his second solo exhibition, "Revolution".

== Awards and nominations ==
- 2007 – "It's Right! Hip-Hop Jam" 3 Rank
- 2007 – HIPHOP.HU Music Awards, "Breakthrough of the Year"
- 2007 – "The Year of hip-hop music video" (tomorrow) (Marking)
- 2009 – VIVA Comet – Best Male Artist
- 2009 – VIVA Comet – Best New Artist
- 2009 – BRAVO OTTO – Hungarian Newcomer of the Year (nomination)
- 2009 – BRAVO OTTO – The Best Hungarian clip (Stop) (nomination)
- 2010 – Fonogram Prize – Domestic Newcomer of the Year
- 2010 – BRAVO OTTO – The Hungarian men's rapporteur for the year
- 2010 – BRAVO OTTO – The Best Hungarian clip (You remain Images)
- 2010 – BRAVO OTTO – Bravo Idol Award
- 2010 – VIVA Comet – Best Male Artist
- 2010 – VIVA Comet – Best video clip (Photo stay) (nomination)
- 2011 – Zene.hu vote – home of the year, album of modern pop-rock
- 2011 – BRAVO OTTO – The Hungarian men's rapporteur for the year (nomination)
- 2011 – BRAVO OTTO – The Best Hungarian clip (SP I Am) (Mark)
- 2011 – BRAVO OTTO – Westend külondíj
- 2011 – VIVA Comet – Best Male Artist

== See also ==
- Hungarian pop
