= Első Emelet =

Hungarian pop music group

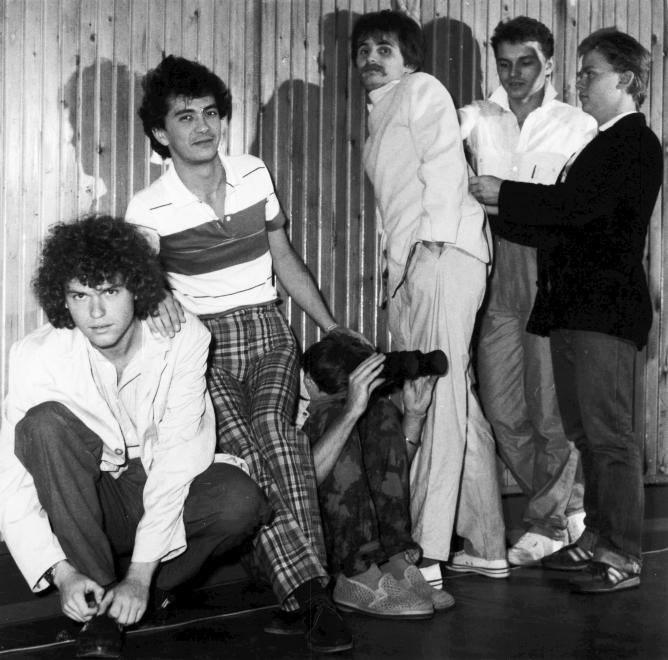
- 1982 line-up. Clockwise from left: István Tereh, György Cser. Gábor Kisszabó, Csaba Bogdán, Ferenc Rausch, Gábor Berkes

Background information
- Origin: Budapest, Hungary
- Genres: Pop rock; new wave; synth-pop; funk rock
- Years active: 1982–1992; 2008–2013; 2017–present
- Labels: Start; Favorit (Hungaroton labels)
- Past members: Gábor Berkes; Csaba Bogdán; Béla Patkó Kiki; Gábor Kisszabó; István Tereh; Gábor Szentmihályi; Zsolt Hastó; Tamás Kelemen; Ferenc Rausch; György Cser; Vilmos Tóth
- Website: elsoemelet.hu

Első Emelet (Hungarian: "First Floor") are a Hungarian pop band formed in Budapest in 1982 by former members of two progressive rock bands: Solaris and Lobogó. Their music video for "Állj, Vagy Lövök!" ("Stop or I'll Shoot!") appeared as "Baby, Baby" by "First Floor" in the music video for "Money for Nothing" by British rock band Dire Straits.

== Members ==
- Gábor Berkes – keyboards, vocals
- Csaba Bogdán – guitar, keyboards, vocals
- Béla Patkó Kiki – vocals
- Gábor Kisszabó – bass guitar, guitar, vocals
- Gábor Szentmihályi – percussion
- Zsolt Hastó – percussion
- István Tereh – backing vocals, percussion, manager
- Tamás Kelemen – guitar
- Gábor Giret – bass guitar
- Zsolt Hastó – drums (from 2008-2013)
- Ferenc Rausch – drums (1982–1983)
- György Cser – vocals (1982)
- Vilmos Tóth – drums (1983)
- Szörényi Örs – drums (1990)
- Gábor Kisszabó - bass guitar, guitar, vocals

== Discography ==
=== Studio albums ===
- Első Emelet 1 (1984)
- Első Emelet 2 (1985)
- Első Emelet 3 (1986)
- Első Emelet 4 (1987)
- Naplemez (1988)
- Vadkelet (1989)
- Kis generáció (1990)
- Megyek a szívem után (2010)

=== Live albums ===
- Turné '88 (1988)

=== Compilation albums ===
- Best of (1997)
