= Neoton Família =

Hungarian pop band

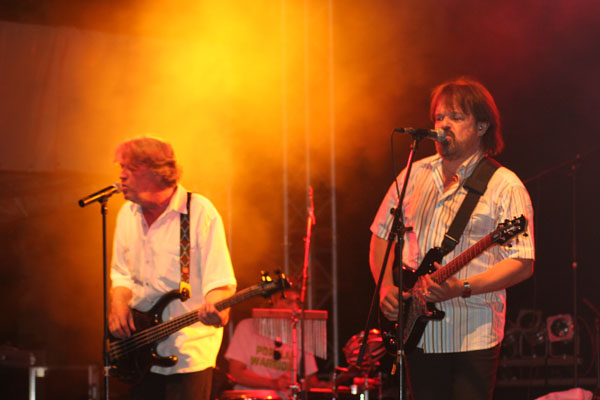
The stars of Neoton Família performing at VOLT Festival, Hungary in 2006

Neoton Família (also known in some countries as Newton Family) was one of the most successful Hungarian pop-bands, their career spanning several decades, with changes in line-up. Most active from 1977 to 1989, they released albums and singles and toured in 25 foreign countries, including Germany, France, Spain, Netherlands, Italy, Brazil, Argentina, Mexico, Canada, Cuba, Japan, India, South Korea, also producing many of the best-known hits in the country. From 1979 to 1989, the band sold over 6 million records in Hungary and about 1.5 million records in other countries and takes on this indicator second place behind the famous band Omega.

== Band history ==
The band was founded in 1965 by László Pásztor and Lajos Galácz, studying economics in Budapest, in order to enter the school's annual Santa Claus music contest. Out of the two bands entering, Neoton, named after their Czechoslovak-made guitar, finished second. Three years passed until their first major success, winning the country-wide Who Knows What? talent show in 1968 with the song Nekem eddig Bach volt a mindenem. The same year marked the release of their first hit song Kell, hogy várj. In 1971 they released their first album, Bolond város, featuring Balázs Ferenc, future keyboardist of the band Taurus and Korál, Lajos Som, future bass guitarist of bands Taurus and Piramis, and Ferenc Debreceni, future drummer of the band Omega. While sales did not go well, it helped them to arrange a tour in Africa. After arriving home, multiple members quit, and the fate of Neoton became uncertain.

From 1973 to 77 they cooperated with girl band Kócbabák (Shaggy Dolls), a trio of three female singers, who first appeared at 1972's Who Knows What?. After a joint album Menedékház (1976, Shelter) they drew the attention of the head of the Hungarian Record Company Pepita, Péter Erdős, who dreamed of achieving international fame with a Hungarian group. The two groups were united, with a renewed style and under a new name, Neoton Família. In 1977 they released an album titled Csak a zene (Only the music) and toured in socialist countries.

1979 proved to be a turning point for Neoton Família, as they got the chance to accompany the Hungarian entrants at the Midem festival in Cannes, and could also play a few tracks of their own - gaining the interest of some foreign music industry officials. They released the album Napraforgó, which finally secured their fame, and later an English version Sunflower. It was released in thirteen countries and became a hit in Japan, Denmark and the Philippines. Their single "Santa Maria" was number one in Hungary, number eight in Spain and number nine in Japan and the second single "Lord of the mountain" was number eleven in Spain and number three in Argentine.

Neoton Família released the single "Don Quijote", which became their biggest hit: number one in Hungary and Japan, TOP5 in Spain, Brazil and Philippines and TOP40 in Denmark and Germany. Their new album Marathon was a bestseller in Hungary and was released in nine countries including Germany, Spain, Denmark, Brazil, Japan and the Philippines. The song "Marathon", which was written for the Moscow Olympiad '80 became their most recognizable composition. In spring 1980 the band also released the soundtrack to the Canadian movie Yesterday, including the song "Smile again", in which the lead-vocal was sung by Éva Csepregi.

In those years the band had big success in the USSR and other socialist countries. In 1981 the group released the album "A família". In Germany it was released by Jupiter Record under the name Dandelion. The album was bestseller in Hungary again and the single "Kétszázhúsz felett" ("Over 220", also released in English as Racing) became a hit in the usual countries. These years proved to be busy, including a Japanese tour of forty-two cities in autumn 1981. The next album Szerencsejáték (1982, Roulette) was also very successful. For the song "Monte Carlo" the group was called "Hungarian ABBA". That year the single "Atra" was released in France, Brazil and Japan, it was the soundtrack to the Canadian-French movie La Guerre du feu (1982).

By 1983 two of the three female singers left the group and Éva Csepregi became the lead singer. In 1983 she and Ádám Végvári, who joined in 1980, won the Grand Prix on Yamaha Music Festival in Tokyo with the song "Times Goes By". Their single "Sandokan" (1983) set a national record sales for singles. Also in 1983 the band made a big tour in Latin America.

For six years onward, the band released an album in each year, with more and more composers working in the team, a condition that not only provided great songs, but tensions, too. In 1986 the band got the Most Outstanding Performance Award on 8th International Seoul Song Festival organized by the Munhwa Broadcasting Corp. with the song "Love is magic". And in 1988 Éva Csepregi and Leslie Mándoki (ex-soloist of the German disco-band Dschinghis Khan) performed the song "Korea" at the opening of the 1988 Summer Olympics in Seoul.

In 1990 Péter Erdős died and this led to the dissolution of the band. The members of the group challenged the right to the name "Neoton" in court and continued their musical careers as Új Neoton (1990-1991), headed by László Pásztor, and Éva-Neoton (1990-1993), headed by Éva Csepregi.

Éva Csepregi and Bob Heatlie, a Scottish songwriter and producer had a son in 1992. Previously, Bob Heatlie produced her solo albums between 1985 and 1992. They were released in Europe and South Korea. Songs from these solo albums became part of the group's live repertoire.

The keyboarder of Neoton Familia György Jakab was diagnosed with a terminal illness in 1995, dying in 1996. His dream, a last concert was produced without him, but in his memory, in 1998 by all of the ex-members of the group. Answering the pressure of the fans, another concert was held seven years later, in 2005, following several more in the oncoming years under the name Neoton Família Sztárjai (Stars of Neoton Family).

== Members ==
Contributing to Neoton during 1965–1977	László Pásztor; Lajos Galácz; Pál Herrer; Fecó Balázs; István Tóth; Ferenc Debreczeni; Lajos Som; Zoltán Ambrus; János Tiboldy; György Jakab
Contributing to Neoton Família during 1977-1990	Éva Csepregi; Éva Fábián; Éva Pál; János Baracs; Zoltán Ambrus; László Pásztor; Ádám Végvári; György Jakab; Gyula Bardóczi; Erzsébet Lukács; Mária Juhász; Edina Schäffer
Contributing to Új Neoton during 1990-1991	Andrea Szulák; László Pásztor; György Jakab; Gyula Bardóczi; Miklós Borhi; Éva Pál; Mária Juhász
Contributing to Éva-Neoton during 1991-1992	Éva Csepregi; Ádám Végvári; János Baracs; Edina Schäffer; Renáta Rajcs; Gábor Erdélyi; Sándor Herpai
Contributing to Neoton Família Sztárjai from 2005	Éva Csepregi; Ádám Végvári; János Baracs; Gyula Bardóczi; Gábor Bardóczi; László Lukács; Andrea Bodza; Dávid Heatlie; Elizabeth Gerrad -Langer

== Albums ==
- Bolond város (1971)
- Menedékház (1976)
- Csak a zene (1977)
- Neoton Disco (in English, 1978)
- Napraforgó (1979)
- Sunflower (English version of Napraforgó, 1980)
- Marathon (1980)
- Listen To Me (English version of Marathon, 1981)
- A familia (1981)
- Dandelion (English version of A familia, 1981)
- Greatest Hits (in English, released in Japan, 1981)
- Szerencsejáték (1982)
- Gamble (English version of Szerencsejáték, 1982)
- Jumping Tour (released in Japan, 1982)
- Neoton Família VII. (1983)
- Jumpy Dance (English version of Neoton Família VII, 1983)
- Aerobic (radio pot-pourri in English, 1983)
- Karnevál (1984)
- Adam & Eve (English version of Karnevál, 1984)
- Magánügyek (1985)
- Monotony (English version of Magánügyek, 1985)
- Minek ez a cirkusz? (1986)
- I Love You (English version of Minek ez a cirkusz?, 1986)
- More - Greatest Hits 20 (in English, released in Japan, 1987)
- Lehet egy kiskutyával több? (a children's album, 1987)
- Védőháló nélkül (1987)
- Attrakcio (compilation of hits 1985–87 years, 1988)
- Vonalra várva (1988)
- Santa Maria és a többiek (compilation of old hits 1976–84 years, 1988)
- Abrakadabra (1989)
- The Best of Neoton Family (1989)
- Búcsú (live, in memory of Dyord Yakab, 1996)
- The Best of Neoton Familia (Russian compilation, 1996)
- Búcsúzni csak szépen (live, 1998)

== See also ==
- Hungarian pop
