= Zsuzsa Cserháti =

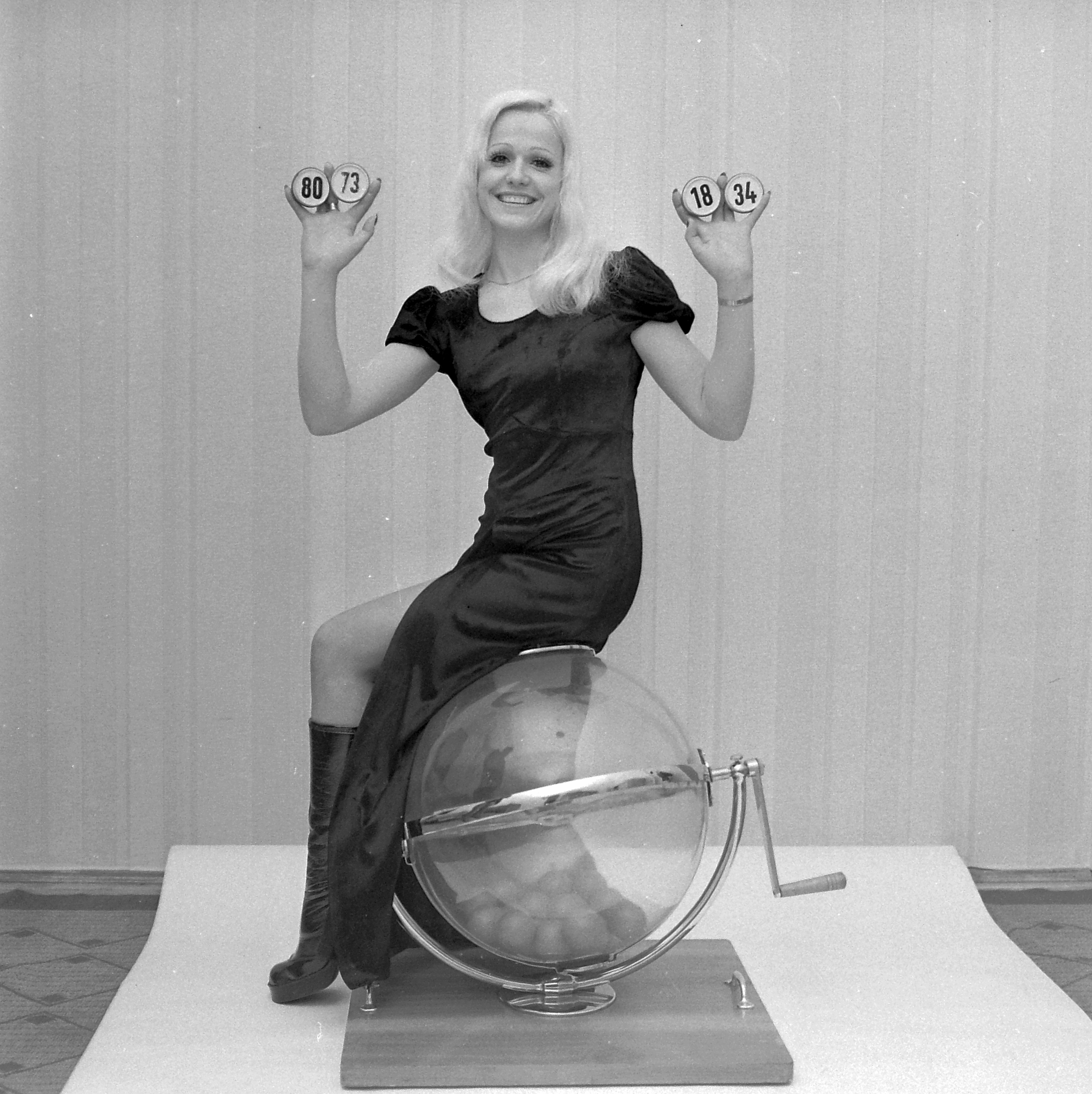

Background information
- Born: June 22, 1948; Budapest, Hungary
- Died: July 23, 2003 (aged 55) Budapest, Hungary
- Genres: Rock, pop, soul and jazz
- Occupation: Singer
- Years active: 1965–2003

Zsuzsa Cserháti (born Zsuzsanna Cserháti June 22, 1948 – July 23, 2003) was a Hungarian pop-soul-jazz and rock singer described as having a unique and versatile voice.

== Life ==
She studied classical ballet for ten years and started to sing in 1965. Her breakthrough started in 1972 with her debut song "He was not a painter"; she was popular singer of the 1970s. Her newborn child inspired her to sing the song "Édes kisfiam" (My Sweet Little Son) to the tune of the Italian instrumental hit Soleado, which became one of her major hits.

In the 1980s, she disappeared from the musical and public life. She claimed that she had been victim of professional jealousy which surrounded her. Other singers later told the media that she had suffered these setbacks because she had refused to have sex with pop manager Péter Erdős who basically controlled the production of all pop and rock music in Hungary in the 1980s. Due to these experiences, she developed severe mental and weight problems.

Cserháti was discovered again in the mid-1990s, her album Ashes and Diamonds (Hamu és gyémánt, 1996) became a great success. Though now a respected and popular singer, she continued to suffer from depression. She died of a ruptured artery at only 55 years of age.

== Personal life ==
Cserháti married technician Károly Szirtes in 1970. In 1976, their only son Krisztián was born. Due to the successful career of his wife at the time, Szirtes was the first man in Hungary to go on parental leave. Though Cserháti always described him as her great love, they divorced in 1980. Their son went on to live with his father, but they retained a good relationship with each other.

After Szirtes' death from cancer in 1990, Krisztián returned to live with his mother. Cserháti's later relationships were unsuccessful; at the time of her death, she had been single for several years.

== Awards ==
- Order of Merit of the Republic of Hungary (1998)

== See also ==
- Hungarian pop
