= Republic (band) =

Hungarian rock band

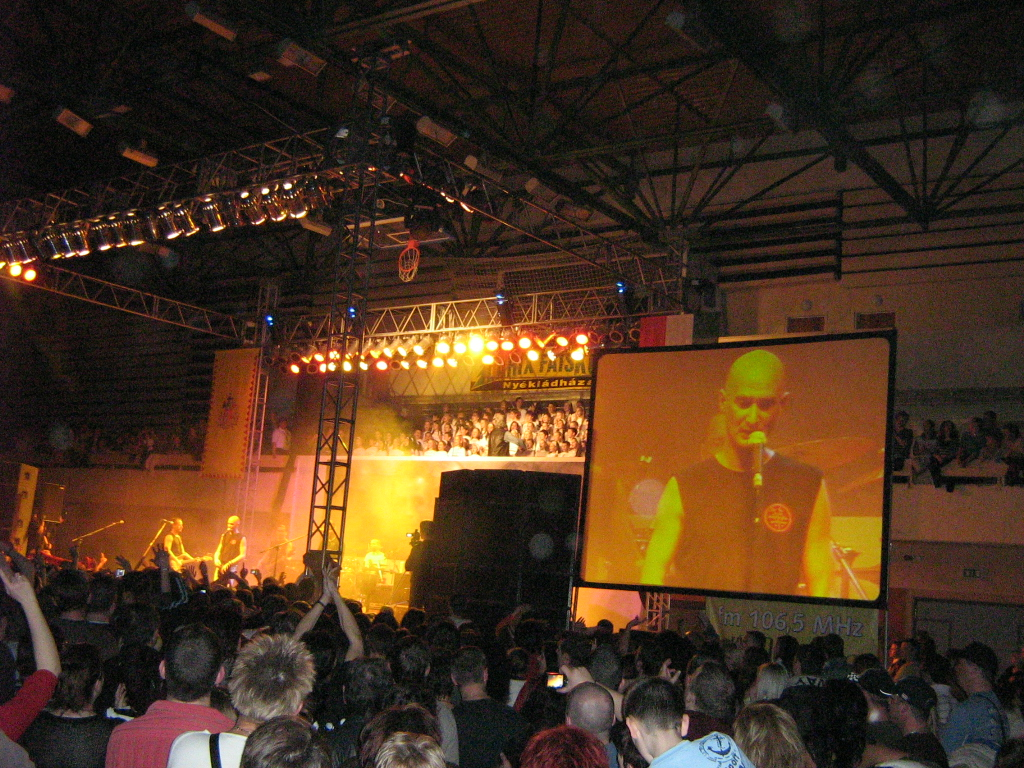
- Republic with László "Cipő" Bódi performing at Miskolc on 15 March 2008

Background information
- Origin: Budapest, Hungary
- Genres: Rock; folk rock; post-punk; pop rock
- Years active: 1990–present
- Labels: EMI; Capitol; Universal; Hungaroton
- Members: László Attila Nagy; Tamás Patai; Csaba Boros; Gábor Halász
- Past members: László "Cipő" Bódi; Imre Bali; László "Bigyó" Szilágyi; Zoltán Tóth
- Website: republic.hu

Republic is a Hungarian rock band formed in Budapest in 1990. Their style is a mix of Western rock music and traditional Hungarian folk music. The band is popular in its native country and among Hungarian speaking minorities in other parts of the world.

== Members ==
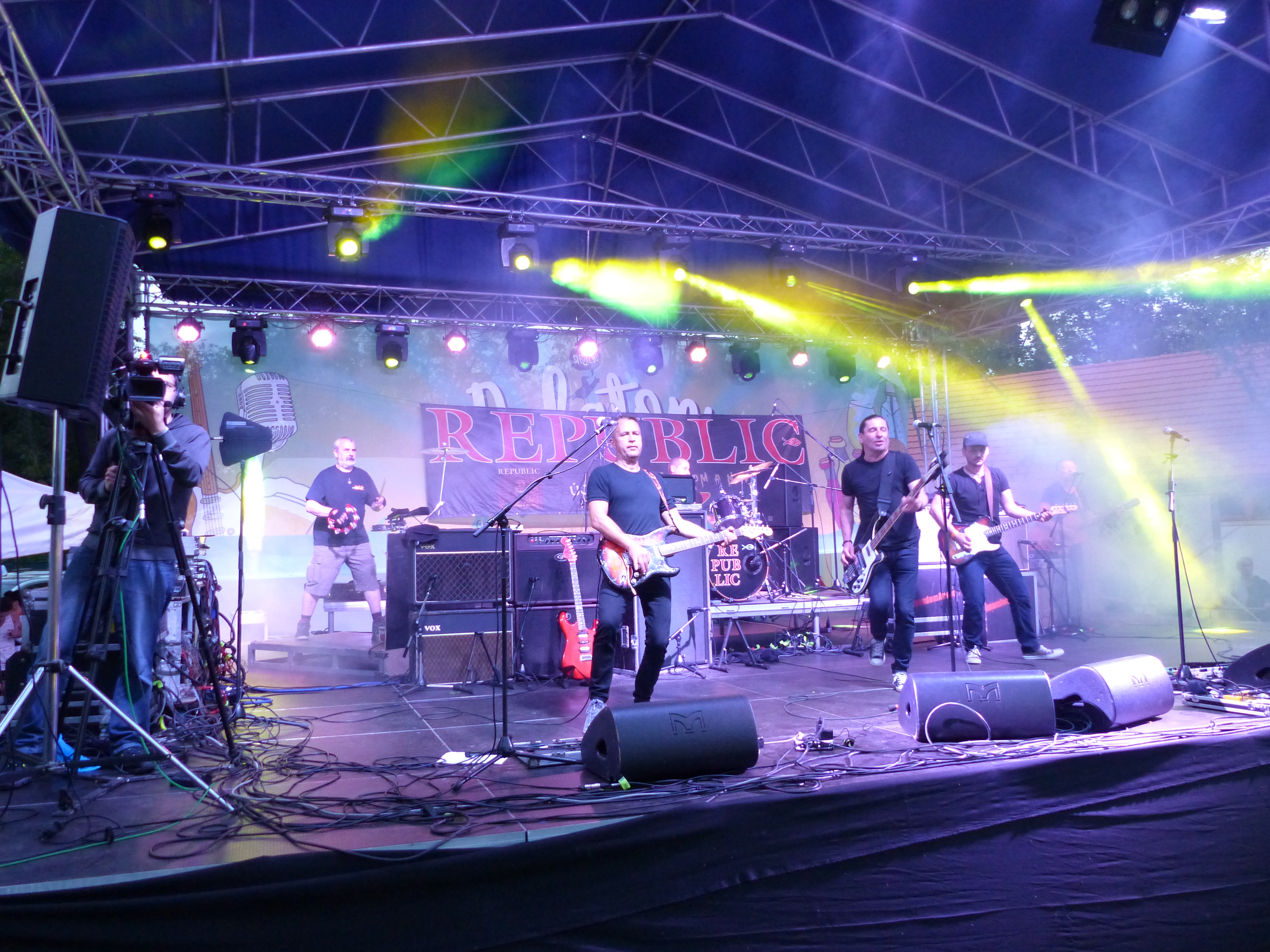
Republic performing at Balaton Festival 2017

The two founding members are László Bódi and László Attila Nagy. The two played together for a band called Cipőfűző (Hungarian for shoelaces). From this name, László Bódi acquired the nickname "Cipő", i.e. shoe. Cipő died in March 2013 at the age of 47. The most recent change in the band's composition was in 1991 when the original lead guitarist Imre Bali retired and was replaced by Tamás Patai.

While not formal members of the band, András "Bundás" Szabó (violin) and Gábor Halász (acoustic guitar, vocals) perform with the band during their live shows.

On albums, Republic frequently refers to itself ironically as "the worst group in Hungary". The logo of the band is a stylised fish which from a certain angle resembles a human figure.

László Bódi died on 11 March 2013 due to heart failure.

=== Current members ===
- László Attila Nagy – drums, percussion, background vocals
- Tamás Patai – guitar, vocals
- Csaba Boros – bass guitar, vocals
- Gábor Halász – acoustic guitar, vocals

=== Former members ===
- László "Cipő" Bódi – vocals, piano (1990–2013†)
- Imre Bali ("Rece Apó") – guitar (1990–1991)
- László "Bigyó" Szilágyi – drums (1990)
- Zoltán Tóth – guitar, piano, vocals (1990–2013)

== Discography ==
=== Studio albums ===
Year	Title	translation
1990	Indul a mandula!!!	The almond departs!!!
1991	Hoppá, Hoppá!!!	Oops! Oops!
1992	Én vagyok a világ	I am the world
1993	Hahó Öcsi!!!	Hey Buddy!!!
1994	Disco	Disco
1995	A Cipő és a Lány – Amsterdam	The Shoe and the Girl – Amsterdam
1995	Tüzet viszek	I'm carrying fire
1996	Igen	Yes
1997	Zászlók a szélben	Flags in the wind
1998	Üzenet	Message
1999	Boldogság.hu	Happiness.hu
2000	Só és cukor	Salt and sugar
2001	A reklám után	After the commercial
2002	Mennyi még, Béla?	How much left, Béla?
2003	Aki hallja, adja át!!!	Whoever hears it, pass it on!!!
2004	Mohikán	Mohawk
2005	1 Magyarország 1 Mennyország	1 Hungary 1 Heaven
2006	Kenyér vagy igazság	Bread or truth
2007	Fényes utakon	On shining roads
2008	Tiszta udvar, rendes ház	Clean yard, tidy house
2010	Köztársaság	Republic
2011	Miért, maga bohóc?	Why, are you a clown?
2012	Bólints Tibi!	Nod, Tibi!
2015	Rajzoljunk Álmokat!	Let's draw Dreams!
2017	Kimondom a neved	I say your name
2019	Magyarazűrben	Hungarian in space

=== Live albums ===
Year	Title	translation
1995	Október 67	October 67
2006	Győri Kex	Biscuit of Győr
2010	20 éves ünnepi koncert	20 years celebration concert
2013	Klasszikusok	Classics
2016	Koncert Budapest Park 2015. 09. 19.	Concert Budapest Park 2015. 09. 19.

=== Compilation albums ===
Year	Title	translation
1999	Az évtized dalai (3x CD)	Songs of the Decade
2000	Aranyalbum	Golden Album
2003	Törmelék	Debris
2009	Új Republic dalok	New Republic Songs
2009	Aranyalbum 2.	Golden Album 2.
