= An Imaginary Report on an American Rock Festival =

- Music: Gábor Presser
- Lyrics: Anna Adamis
- Book: Sándor Pós; English adaptation by: William A. Frankonis
- Setting: Altamont Free Concert
- Basis: Short novel Képzelt riport egy amerikai popfesztiválról by Tibor Déry
- Premiere: March 2, 1973: Comedy Theatre of Budapest
- Productions: 1986 Albany, NY; 2007 Budapest, Hungary concert

An Imaginary Report on an American Rock Festival (Hungarian: Képzelt riport egy amerikai popfesztiválról) is a Hungarian musical by composer Gábor Presser, lyricist Anna Adamis and book writer Sándor Pós based on the short novel of the same name by Tibor Déry. The musical premiered in 1973, and being the first successful Hungarian rock musical (and also Presser's first theatrical work) opened the way for popular music to Hungarian theatres and literature. It is set in a U.S. rock festival and tells a story of a married Hungarian immigrant couple.

The tragic musical became an instant critical and box office success in Hungary and—thanks to the several guest performances—Europe after its premiere in the Comedy Theatre of Budapest on March 2, 1973. Since then it has been performed by many Hungarian theatres in Europe while its English debut was in The Egg, Albany, New York, in March 1986. According to Színházi kalauz, a Hungarian encyclopedia of plays, “the most prominent productions were Balázs Kovalik's staging of 1999 in Szeged with choreography by Tamás Juronics and János Szikora's clear-out, thought-provoking rendition in Szolnok (2005).”

The songs of the musical became hits in Hungary and parts of the repertoire of Locomotiv GT. A radio play version of the musical was made in 1979. On the 25th anniversary of the premiere, the songs were reworked by Gergő Borlai, which were the basis of a new concert version of the show.

== History ==
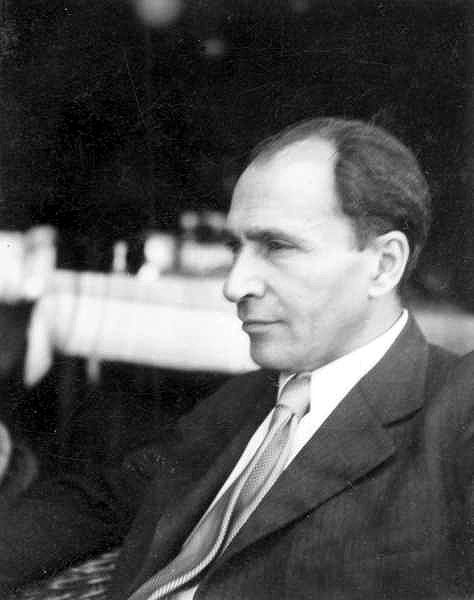
Tibor Déry

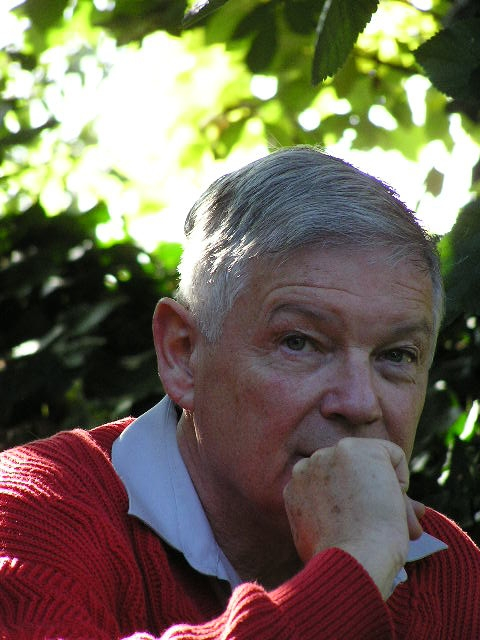
László Marton

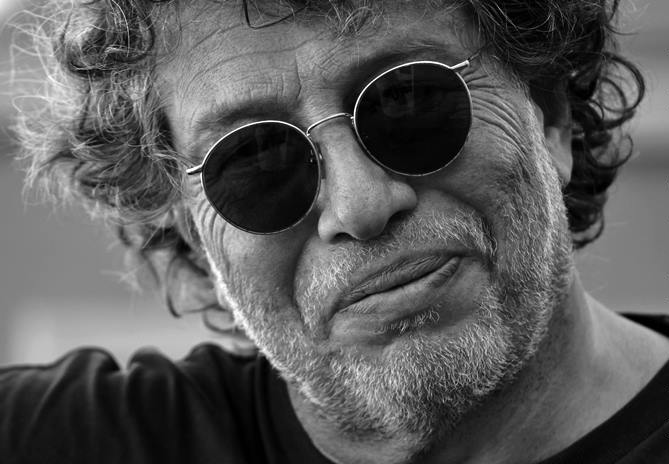
Gábor Presser

The fathers of An Imaginary Report

Sándor Pós writer and dramaturge, assistant director of the National Theatre, seeing his career opportunities as a director to have been exploited there, suggested the need for a "youth theatre" at a professional debate in 1971. While researching for the proposed repertoire, Levente Osztovics recommended him Tibor Déry's short novel titled Képzelt riport egy amerikai popfesztiválról, the theme of which Pós found appropriate for the adolescent and young adult audiences. Since his submission for theatre establishment did not get an official answer, he presented the idea of the play to the manager of the National Theatre, Béla Both, who liked the concept and charged Pós with the dramatisation. Déry, being uncertain in the outcome of the enterprise until the premiere, gave his permission. After Both retired, the new manager, Endre Marton chose to direct the play himself and appointed Pós as assistant, but the rehearsals never started. After three months of waiting, Déry—with Pós's approval—gave the rights to the Comedy Theatre and Pós contracted to Magyar Rádió.

Manager Zoltán Várkonyi gained the permits from the Department for Agitation and Propaganda of the Central Committee of the Hungarian Socialist Workers' Party by introducing the plot as a "criticism of the Western hippie culture". The authorities, however, kept their eyes on the rehearsals. Várkonyi asked László Marton to direct the play. During rehearsals Pós's 120-page-long draft was significantly shortened, but was enriched with songs in accordance with the customs of the theatre. While several "traditional" theatrical composers were suggested for An Imaginary Report, Marton preferred to work with popular musicians. His first choice was the Illés — to whom the original novel often refers to, drawing a comparison between them and The Rolling Stones. However, lyricist János Bródy and composer Levente Szörényi turned down the opportunity because of the anti-rock surface layer of the original short novel. (They continued to search for the topic of their planned rock opera in Hungarian history, see: István, a király.)

Next the authors of another popular Hungarian rock band, the Locomotiv GT—composer Gábor Presser and lyricist Anna Adamis—were asked who were unfamiliar with theatrical composing at the time. Their initial answer was negative for similar reasons but Presser, after rethinking the novel, ultimately changed his mind. He said, “When I met with Tibor Déry in connection with Rock Festival asked him if I understood correctly what the novel was about. I thought, it was about when you leave [your homeland], you bring it with you. He said 'yes'. So the story was in place for me.” Presser—previously known only as a rock musician—used his own musical style when composing thirteen songs for the musical. Concerning the lyrics, Adamis stated:

Freedom, human opportunities, togetherness, the power of circumstances, the desire to break free, love, faith and other … basic human things and feelings interested me when writing the lyrics if it's even a clever thing to analyse them on a content-feeling basis. I wrote what was inside me, and the way I think. The play differs from the so-called American-sense musicals in its topic, songs, and style.

An Imaginary Report met negative responses prior to its premier due to the paradox that caused the Illés to turn down the project. According to the paradox, the musical criticises the extremes and exaggerations of the popular culture, the youth culture, yet exploits its musical style. While the theatre world disliked the integration of rock music, the popular music industry had a problem with its topic. The play violated taboos on drugs, homosexuality, and the Holocaust. Péter Szántó wrote in his book És ilyen a boksz?, “An Imaginary Report was born in a hostile, tense environment. There was a split in the Locomotiv, since Károly Frenreisz (his brother Zoltán Latinovits exited the Comedy Theatre with anger) left the band. Almost each star of the contemporary [Hungarian] beat, rock, and pop-music was against it because they thought it to be against youth, and they didn't like the fact that a band like the Locomotiv participated in an official theatrical production. They thought it to be the treason of the genre.”

Upon its premiere on March 2, 1973, An Imaginary Report became a Europe-wide box office and critical hit.

== Synopsis ==
The musical—similarly to the short novel it's based on—although set in Montana, tells the fictionalised story of the Altamont Free Concert and the killing of Meredith Hunter. It focuses on a married Hungarian defector couple, and draws parallel between the drugged crowd, Hell's Angels and the holocaust and the Arrow Cross Party.

=== Act 1 ===
There is an infinite line of cars on the rainy highway, made up by 300 thousand young people heading to the Montana Rock Festival ("Menni kéne"). Flocks of birds appearing on the sky cast an ominous shadow on the crowd ("Valaki mondja meg"). In one of the cars sits József who fled from Hungary to New York City in 1956 and who is searching for his also immigrant wife, Eszter who travelled to the festival in spite of her husband's disagreement. On the way, he picks up a hitchhiker, the Boy whom he provokes because of his homosexuality and then throws him out of his car. He talks about Eszter and their love to a strange woman who offers him to marry for a couple of days. Eszter materialises in a vision ("Arra születtem"). As József arrives to the festival, meets several of his acquaintances including Manuel but can't find Eszter ("Ringasd el magad I."). The exhausted József falls into sleep where Eszter finds him but doesn't wake him up. She leaves with her American friend, Beverley, and they witness in the drugged crowd as during a riot one of the Hells Angels contracted as security stabs a knife in the heart of a black boy called Meredith Hunter. József hears Eszter's scream, sends a message to her but she refuses to meet ("Nem akarom látni"). The circumstances of the murder are described by a Witness whose personal story is also revealed.

József continues his search for Eszter. He finds a dazed friend, René. Although, he is unable to help either, through him he meets a Canadian doctor, Marianne escorting her druggie husband ("Fák is siratják"). József—increasingly worried by his wife's whereabouts—continues the search ("Add, hogy mégegyszer").

=== Act 2 ===
Eszter and Beverley leave the concert and find shelter in a tent where the Boy gives hashish to Eszter ("Ringasd el magad II."). Under the influence of the drug, she remembers the ghettos while in a nearby tent József listens to a philosophical discussion between Joshua and Frantisek. Eszter tells the story of her marriage, as well. Eventually József and Eszter meet ("Vinnélek, vinnélek"), however, while József is looking for the car to take his wife home, Eszter disappears.

Eszter while on her way to the concert with Beverley is gnawed by further drug-visions. She sees fleeing Jews instead of festival-goers ("Indulás a koncertre"). An Arrowcross Bird talks to her and gives her a new dose of drug. She is parted from Beverley by the crowd, and in the meantime the District Attorney interrogates a Hells Angel about the murder. Both József and Beverley search for Eszter ("Eszter keresése"). Eszter becomes “the symbol of pureness and being humane” and the search turns into a symbolic quest. The pinprick in Eszter's vision is in fact real, since the Boy gave her heroin and when József finds her, she is dying.

József feels self-reproach and as he mourns her, the Boy stabs him but he doesn't die. The Boy is captured by the police. The District Attorney interrogates the murderer. Beverley—having been informed about the events from Bill—mourns, and tries to understand the reasons of Eszter's death ("Arra született"). The finale differs depending on the concept of the director: the musical may end with the optimistic "Arra születtünk" that sets the aim of healing Earth's wounds (and cleaning up the trash after the festival) or with the rather melancholic reprise of "Valaki mondja meg".

== List of musical numbers ==
Act 1

- "Menni kéne" — the Chorus
- "Valaki mondja meg" — Witness & the Chorus
- "Arra születtem" — Eszter
- "Ringasd el magad I." — Manuel & the Chorus
- "Nem akarom látni" — Eszter
- "A fák is siratják" — Marianne
- "Add, hogy mégegyszer" / "Add hogy mégegyszer lássam" — József & the Chorus

Act 2

- "Ringasd el magad II." — the Chorus
- "Vinnélek, vinnélek" — Eszter & József
- "Indulás a koncertre" — instrumental
- "Eszter keresése" — József & Beverley
- "Arra született" — first, second & third girls
- "Finálé" / "Arra születtünk" — the Chorus

== Productions ==
=== Original Hungarian production ===
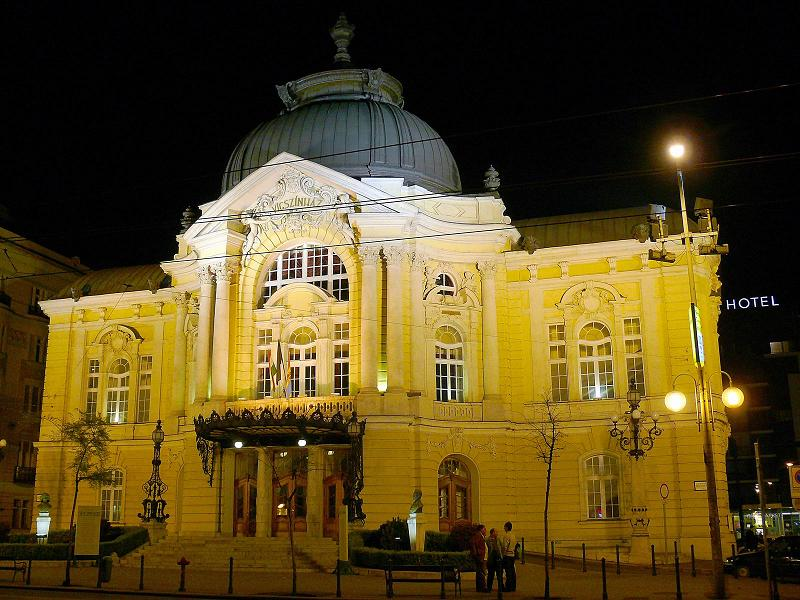
The Comedy Theatre, the venue of the premiere

The premiere was on March 2, 1973, at the Comedy Theatre of Budapest. The production was directed by László Marton, choreographed by György Geszler, the set was designed by Miklós Fehér, while the costumes by Márta Jánoskúti. This production run for eight years when it was revived by Marton which version run again for years reaching 400 performances.

Presser himself taught the actors, who were inexperienced in rock music, the songs. The cast included many young artist who later became popular actors, like Éva Almási, Attila Apró, Péter Balázs, Ilona Béres, Márta Egri, Béla Ernyey, Krisztina Ferenczi, György Gárdonyi, D. Géza Hegedűs, György Kemény, András Kern, Róbert Koltai, Gábor Koncz, László Komár, István Kovács, Erzsébet Kútvölgyi, Judit Lukács, Sándor Lukács, Zoltán Moser, Gábor Nagy, Sándor Oszter, Sándor Szakácsi, Erika Szegedi, Éva Szerencsi, and László Tahi Tóth. Initially, the Locomotiv GT played live during each performances while later the Gemini understudied them.

The production went on guest performances all around the Eastern Bloc—they played, for example, in the Deutsches Nationaltheater and Staatskapelle Weimar (1974), the Schauspiel Leipzig (1977), the Volksbühne in East Berlin, the Bulandra Theatre in Bucharest, at the Belgrade International Theatre Festival, and in the National Theatre in Prague. At these performances many people from capitalist countries, including critics had the opportunity to see the musical. In Prague An Imaginary Report enjoyed so much attention that they had to give two performances on the same night. Many figures of the Czech cultural life attended to these occasions, including Václav Havel, Bohumil Hrabal, and Emil Zátopek.

=== Other major Hungarian language productions ===
The musical have been staged by many Hungarian language companies. The second and third productions were that of the National Theatre of Szeged and the Katona József Theatre in Kecskemét in the first half of 1974. Péter Trokán and Ildikó Pécsi starred in the latter one. Three further productions debuted in 1975 in the National Theatre of Pécs, the National Theatre of Miskolc, and Szigligeti Theatre in Szolnok. The Szolnok cast included Sándor Szakácsi as József, and also Mari Csomós, Péter Czibulás, Mátyás Usztics, Frigyes Hollósi, Katalin Andai and Zoltán Papp. Another staging had its premiere in March 1979 in Kisfaludy Theatre (today National Theatre of Győr).

The first production of An Imaginary Report in Transylvania was directed by Béla Horváth in the Hungarian Theatre of Cluj in 1980. the Comedy Theatre revived the musical on September 11, 1981, with Sándor Szakácsi as József, Nóra Kovács as Eszter, Judit Hernádi as Beverley, and Péter Rudolf as the Witness. The musical had a run of several years from 1986 in the Petőfi Theatre in Veszprém. The Gárdonyi Géza Theatre in Eger staged the musical in fall 1988.

Its Slovakian premiere was on October 1, 1993, in the Jókai Theatre of Komárom. In 1995 it was shown in the Hevesi Sándor Theatre in Zalaegerszeg, Jókai Theatre of Békés County in Békéscsaba, and Petőfi Theatre in Veszprém. The Veszprém revival cast was led by Kriszta Kovács as Eszter, Tibor Gazdag as József, and Péter Novák as Manuel. The first production in Tatabánya was the Jázsai Mari Theatre production in June 1999. The open-air premiere of An Imaginary Report was at the Open Air Festival in Szeged on August 19, 1999, and was directed by Balázs Kovalik and choreographed by Tamás Juronics. The production moved to the National Theatre of Szeged on October 9, and starred Judit Schell as Eszter, Mónika Sáfár as Beverley, Iván Kamarás as József and Péter Novák as Manuel/Mick Jagger. The musical had a production in the Castle Theatre of Kőszeg in August 2000.

The Szigligeti Company of the State Theatre of Oradea presented the musical on October 7, 2001. The Ruttkai Éva Theatre in Budapest had an all-star production of the musical in early 2002 with a cast including Kata Janza, Eszter Végvári, Tibor Pintér, Rita Tallós, Anikó Gruiz, Pál Makrai, Feró Nagy, Adrienn Fehér, Péter Straub, Ottó Kinizsi, Pál Feke, and István Szekeres. The critically acclaimed staging of János Szikora premiered on January 28, 2005, in Szigligeti Theatre, Szolnok. During fall 2005 two further productions debuted: one by the Harag György Company of the Northern Theatre of Satu Mare and the other in the Pannon Castle Theatre in Veszprém.

The company of Pannon Castle Theatre revived the musical in July 2012 at the Kőszeg Castle Theatre, while the Gárdony Gáza Theatre did so in October 2013 starring Anna Trokán.

=== English language production ===
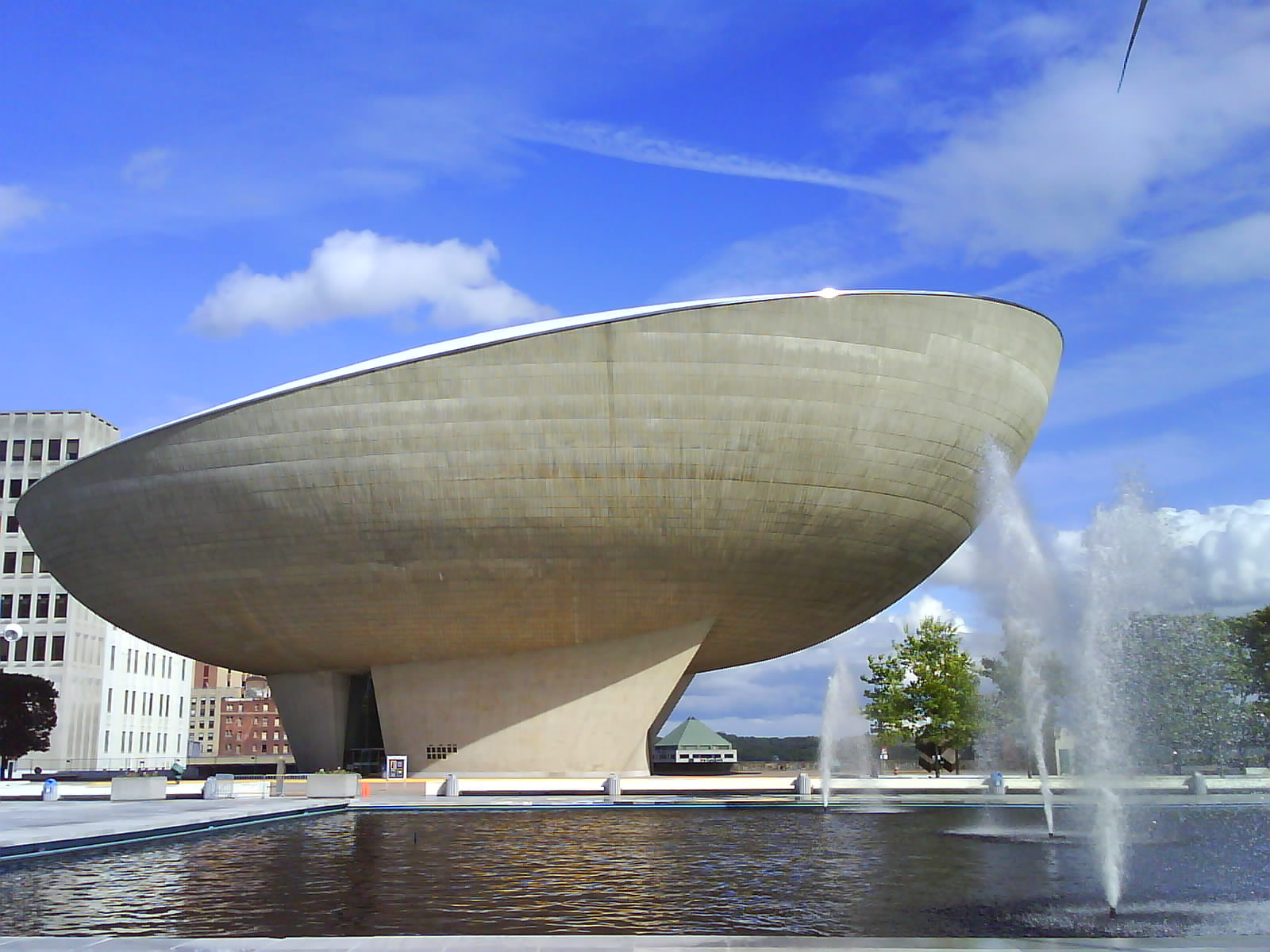
The Egg, Albany, New York

Manager Rose Deak of The Egg, Albany, NY saw An Imaginary Report in Budapest, and decided to show it to American audiences. Preparations lasted for eight years since it was impossible to stage a Hungarian play during the first presidential term of Ronald Reagan because of the state of the Cold War. Deak collaborated with the Empire State Institute for the Performing Arts (ESIPA) whom she worked together earlier on Ferenc Molnár's The Swan. The performances were held between March 15 (the Hungarian National Day) and 22, 1986.

The book was translated and adapted to the English language by the director of ESIPA, William A. Frankonis. The lyrics were translated by Anna Adamis. It was directed by Rose Deak, choreographed by Patricia Birch, its costumes were designed by Karen Krammer, its set by Loren Sherman, and its lighting by Victor En Yu Tan. The music director was Louis St. Louis who cooperated with Presser. It starred Leonard Crofoot as Frantisek, Lynnie Godfrey as Beverley, Joseph Larrabee-Quandi as József, Forest Dino Ray as Manuel, and Jeanne Vigilante as Eszter.

== Adaptations ==
=== Radio play ===
A radio play version of An Imaginary Report was aired on Kossuth Rádió on August 29, 1979. The 76-minute-long play recorded in the studio of the National Theatre was directed by Sándor Pós and used the musical base of the Comedy Theatre production. Originally, it was planned to record the theatrical production itself but recording a separate radio play instead proved to be easier due to technical reasons. It also made changes possible. The radio play introduces the plot via hidden microphones of two reporters (Katalin Szegvári and János Szilágyi). The main roles were played by Géza Hegedüs D. (József), Ilona Bencze (Eszter), Ilona Béres (Beverley), Mari Csomós (Marianne), István Dégi (Boy), József Székhelyi (Manuel), László Sinkó (District Attorney), Gyula Szombathy (Witness), László Csurka (Hell's Angel), Károly Mécs (Voice), Gábor Markaly (René), László Vajda (Joshua), Tamás Dunai (Frantisek), István Kovács (Bill), Gabi Borbás (Juana), Tibor Varga (Marianne's husband), and Zsuzsa Farkas (Girl). The assistant directors were Ildikó Tolnai and Sándor Bereczky, the editor László Simon, the music director Sándor Ruitner, and the music manager Mária Fekete.

=== 25th anniversary ===
In 1998, on the 25th anniversary of the musical Gábor Presser and Gergő Borlai touched up and re-orchestrated the songs. The updated version was recorded with the contemporary stars of Hungarian popular music including Ákos Kovács, Dóra Szinetár, András Lovasi, Eszter Bíró, Adrienn Fehér, Attila Kaszás, Roy Kohánszky, Péter Szolnoki, Edit Balázsovits, Péter Novák, and Bea Tisza. These songs were transformed by Péter Novák into an hour-long concert version of the musical which the plot was left out of but dancing interludes were incorporated into. It premiered in 2000 at the LGT Festival and was performed again at the 2007 Sziget Festival.

=== 40th anniversary ===
To commemorate the 40 years of An Imaginary Report, a new production debuted at the Comedy Theatre on September 8, 2013, under the title Popfesztivál 40, utilizing the songs, the plot outline, and archive footage of the original musical. Directed by Enikő Eszenyi, with costume and set designs by Anni Füzér, featuring original cast members László Tahi-Tóth and Éva Almási, the production starred Edit Balázsovits (Eszter), Péter Telekes (József), Éva Bata (Marianne), Máté Mészáros (witness, Joshua), Kata Péter (Beverley), Áron Molnár (Angel of Hell), András Lajos (Manuel), László Józan (Bill), Zoltán Géczi (boy), Kata Gonda (Juana), and Janka Kopek (girl).

At the time Popfesztivál 40 premiered, there was a fierce competition between director and incumbent manager Eszenyi and original An Imaginary Report cast member (and manager of Szigligeti Theatre in Szolnok) Péter Balázs for the managerial position of Comedy Theatre. Eszenyi invited Balázs to be part of the anniversary performance, but he declined, therefore he only appeared on archive footage.

== Response ==
=== Critical reception ===
An Imaginary Report's themes and atmosphere was compared to that of Hair's and its music to Porgy and Bess by Frankfurter Allgemeine Zeitung, while its story to West Side Story by the director of the U.S. premiere.

==== Original production ====
Upon its premiere, the musical received overwhelmingly positive critical response. Erika Szántó wrote for Színház: "Sándor Pós borrowed an idea, a topic, characters, and a story from the work of Déry; anything that could be otherwise arbitrarily replaced, left out, or exchanged. He put together a smart and well-manageable framework and—left it empty. But it is not to be condemned but to be appreciated. The adaptation realized that this irregular novel cannot be adapted, however, it is a great theatrical occasion. … There are lot of things to be glad about in the production of Comedy Theatre. I start with the one that is not even that important in itself: the creation of a high-standard Hungarian musical. … On the other hand, what seems to be even more important than the appearance of a new theatrical genre: that a new theatrical quality appeared." Tamás Ungvári wrote in Magyar Nemzet that "The first rock musical was born with a literary and musical material that could compete with international examples. … The Anna Adamis's lyrics are tender, poetic extensions of the Déry's dialogues, and the superb songs composed by Gábor Presser fit naturally into the play and have great dramatic, intensifying effects." He called the production "an endeavour deserving encouragement" and "an inspired, prestigious, suggestive performance," and recommended that it should be followed by an all-musical show (rock opera). Further reviews were published in Hungarian periodicals Esti Hírlap, Népszava, Népszabadság, Fővárosi Színházak Műsora, Ország Világ, Tükör, Élet és Irodalom, Kritika, Kortárs, Jelenkor, and Népújság.

==== Albany production ====
The U.S. premier met with less enthusiastic reviews than its European counterpart. Martin P. Kelly from Times Union—acknowledging its European success—felt that the musical lost something in translation. He criticized the "didactic" script, and found the music, the actors, and the direction all weak. "[A] whole act or, at least a prologue, appears to be missing," which would elaborate on the main characters' motivations, adds Kelly. Bob Goepfert wrote a more positive review for The Knickerbocker News, although, he thought that it "is a work that is either 20 years after its time, or 20 years ahead of its time" with "little relevance to the 1980s." Goepfert found the storyline "troubled," but the performances strong, the music direction "marvellous," and the choreography "fresh and invigorating". He finished his article by saying "This is a production that will entertain the young in the audience, but if offers little insight to our culture of 20 years ago. Sadly, it is so naive, it is not even an effective anti-drug statement that could influence today's teenagers."

==== Upon the 2007 concert production ====
When the concert version of the play was performed as an opening act for Locomotiv GT at the 2007 Sziget Festival, it came into the attention of mainstream media yet again. Although, numerous reviewers formed a positive opinion of the concert, praising the timelessness of the songs and the talent of the actors, many turned on the play. These critics revisited the paradox mentioned above, lambasted the themes, the short novel it is based on, and the motivation of Presser and company. They deemed the songs outdated even by the standards of the early 1970s, and harshly criticized both their 1998 cover versions as well as the original production at the Comedy Theatre. László Valuska of Index.hu called it an ″anti-Sziget, Communist propaganda work,″ and wrote that "Déry reviled and defamed the very culture [Bródy and his friends] admired so much. But then came along the Anna Adamis–Gábor Presser duo, and—probably using the well-known strategy of subverting from within—they wrote the play. And at the same time, they managed to erase from everybody's mind how terribly stupid the words of Déry had been. Today, An Imaginary Report is the same kind of lame house party music as István, a király. Though, the castrated ideological humbug did survive somewhere in the background—it's enough to read the lyrics to see—so it remains inconceivable how this was chosen to celebrate the 15th anniversary of Sziget." For Népszabadság, Péter Uj wrote "Well now: today's the day when the sensational rave begins with the rock-operetta version of a horrible, stupid, anti-rock propaganda play, which became a rock legend of local interest over the times, proving that the people of Árpád understood absolutely nothing of rock and roll, or—even worse—of the regime change, but is quite susceptible of the words of György Aczél. … Everything has to be, should be treated by its values, An Imaginary Report forgotten completely, and the same way Gyula Horn wasn't honoured, Presser–Adamis would deserve a snub, at least if we'd like to pretend that there has been a regime change." (Sándor Zsugmond Papp, from the same newspaper, reviewed the concert with appreciation.)

János Sebők reacted to the negative reviews in Élet és Irodalom, concluding that "in the midst of the intellectual slaughter of the early 70s, the production meant an outbreak from the ideological ghetto that paralysed (liquidated, banished) so many things and so many people in this country. And even though, the play did become a 'toy' for those in power and for debaters upon its birth and even later—the same way István, a király did ten years afterwards—its influence, all the covers and directorial concepts since, prove that the work withstood the test of time. And most importantly, the audience feels it its own, even after almost thirty-five years."

=== Cultural impact ===
The musical—thanks to its musical style—managed to substitute the banned Jesus Christ Superstar and opened the way before rock and other popular music genres into the theatre and the arts. An Imaginary Report is the first of many successful theatrical works by Presser. It was followed by musicals like Harmincéves vagyok, Jó estét nyár, jó estét szerelem, A padlás, and Túl a Maszat-hegyen. Many actors who later gained popularity started their career in An Imaginary Report.

Most of the songs—most notably "Menni kéne", "Valaki mondja meg", "Arra születtem", "Vinnélek", and "Ringasd el magad"—made their ways to the repertoire of Locomotive GT and to Hungarian popular culture. They have had several recordings outside the musical, while "Menni kéne", "Valaki mondja meg", and "Ringasd el magad I." were also included in another musical, Szent István körút 14. "Valaki mondja meg", "Ringasd ek magad I.", and "Vinnélek, vinnélek" were performed on the video recording Vígszínházi búcsú.

"Valaki mondja meg" has been covered—among others—by Zorán Sztevanovity on his album Szép holnap (1987), by band Géniusz on Csillagokból kő, by Zsuzsa Koncz on Miénk itt a tér, by Zorán again on live album Koncert – Budapest Sportcsarnok (1996), by composer Gábor Presser with Péter Kovács and Viktória Voga live on Koncert – Dalok régről és nemrégről (2003), by Presser again in studio on Dalok a színházból (2004), and as a duet by then-husband-and-wife Zoltán Bereczki and Dóra Szinetár on Musical duett (2007). The song is also present on the DVDs Koncert a Budapest Sportarénában (2005) és a Presser Gábor és vendégei – Jótékonysági koncert „Az Élet Menete Alapítvány” javára by Zorán & Presser, and Presser, respectively.

"Ringasd al magad" was first published on the 1972 Locomotive GT album of the same title, although, it was only a shorter early version of the song. Later, as the musical version was finished, the song was re-released on 1973 album Bummm! and 1992 video recording Báj-báj Loksi!. Many artists other than Locomotive GT have recorded their versions of the song. These include Rapülők on albums Rapeta (1993) and Riszájkling Show, original cast artist Péter Balázs with Gábor Török on Calypso duett album (1994), Kimnowak on maxi single Ringasd el magad / Ide doki kell (1997), Jimmy Zámbó in 1999 (which recording was released posthumously on Requiem in 2005), Pál Makrai for compilation album Best of Musical 1. – A világ legszebb musical slágerei magyarul (2006), Péter Puskás on Megasztár Allstar – A három sorozat legnagyobbjai!, and composer Presser on his live album Koncert – Dalok régről és nemrégről. The song was also recorded by Locomotive GT in English, under the title "Rock Yourself".

"A fák is siratják" has been covered by Linda Király on album #1 in 2003, and by Nguyen Thanh Hien on compilation Megasztár – A legenda folytatódik – A döntősök kedvenc dalai in 2008.

Versions of "Vinnélek, vinnelek" can be found on albums Judy gitár of 1983 by István Faragó, Dalok a színházból by composer Presser, and DVD Presser Gábor és vendégei – Jótékonysági koncert „Az Élet Menete Alapítvány” javára by Mariann Falusi and Péter Novák.

The singing and piano sheets of the musical were published by Rózsavölgyi és Társa in 1999, 2004, and 2007.

== Recordings ==
The songs of the musical were published first with the original cast in the year of the premiere on LP (SLPX 16579) by Qualiton—the predecessor of Hungaroton. It was re-released on CD (HCD 37659) by Hungaroton in 1992 along with the songs of the second Presser–Adamis musical, Harmincéves vagyok. The cover art was drawn by György Kemény. The record reached outstanding sales, while upon its CD release it was featured on the Mahasz Top 40 album list. When the concert version was shown at the 2007 Sziget Festival, the album reached #2 on the same list.

In 1995, the songs performed by the Veszprém revival cast were recorded and published on CD.

The 25th anniversary adaptations of the songs were published by BMG Ariola Hungary on CD and Compact Cassette in 1998 and reached #2 on the Mahasz Top 40 album list.
