= Attila Bartis =

Hungarian writer and photographer (born 1968)

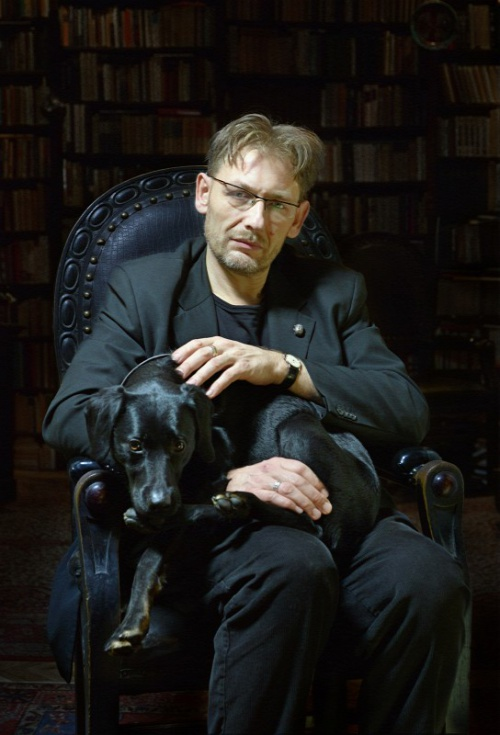
- Bartis in 2013
- Born: 22 January 1968 (age 58); Târgu Mureș, Romania
- Citizenship: Hungary
- Education: Bálint György Újságíró Iskola (1990–91)
- Occupations: Writer; photographer; dramatist; journalist
- Children: 2
- Relatives: Ferenc Bartis (father)
- Writing career
- Language: Hungarian
- Years active: 1995–present
- Notable work: Tranquility (2001)
- Notable awards: Attila József Prize (2005)

Attila Bartis (born 1968) is a Romanian-born Hungarian writer, photographer, dramatist and journalist. He received the Attila József Prize in 2005. His books have been translated into over 20 different languages. In 2001, he published his second novel, Tranquility, which was adapted into film in 2008. In 2017, he became a member of the Széchenyi Academy of Literature and Arts.

== Early life and education ==
Attila Bartis was born in 1968 in Târgu Mureș, in the Transylvania region of Romania. His parents were Ferenc Bartis (1936–2006) and Margit Gherasim. Ferenc, his father, was a writer, poet and journalist. His family were part of the Hungarian minority of Romania. Following the Hungarian Revolution of 1956, Ferenc was imprisoned in Gherla Prison but was given amnesty by Nicolae Ceaușescu seven years later and released. Attila grew up drawing, painting, photographing and writing poems and short stories. His mother, who played the violin, died in the summer of 1983. In 1984, sixteen-year-old Attila and his father were stripped of their Romanian citizenship and presented with stateless passports, and advised to leave for Hungary. Attila moved with his father to Budapest. Attila graduated from a gymnasium in Pest. Between 1990 and 1991, he studied photography at the Bálint György Újságíró Iskola of the Magyar Újságírók Országos Szövetsége (MÚOSZ). He worked as a photographer and in a used bookstore.

== Career ==
=== Writing ===
In 1995, at the age of twenty-seven, he published his debut novel, A séta. In 1998, his debut short story collection, A kéklő pára, was published. Bartis is perhaps best known for his novel Tranquility (Hungarian: A nyugalom), which was published in 2001. Tranquility was adapted into film, titled Nyugalom (2008). The film was directed by Róbert Alföldi and stars Dorottya Udvaros, Zalán Makranczi, Dorka Gryllus and Judit Hernádi. Tranquility was translated into English by Imre Goldstein in 2008. It was the first time his work had been translated into English. Goldstein's translation won the Best Translated Book Award (2009).

For one year, Bartis wrote short stories in the feuilleton of magazine Élet és Irodalom, publishing one story each month. In 2005, he published A Lázár apokrifek, a collection of the twelve short stories he wrote for the magazine.

In 2010, Bartis and poet István Kemény published a book, titled Amiről lehet, which features conversations from interviews they conducted of each other. In 2010, he published Tizenegy novella, an anthology consisting of eleven of Bartis' short stories, all of which were previously published in A kéklő pára and A Lázár apokrifek, with the exception of the story "Gyergyó éghajlata".

In 2019, Bartis published Az eltűnt idő nyoma, a collection of diary entries and "sticky notes".

In the early 2000s, Bartis spent time living abroad, with a DAAD scholarship in Berlin, Germany, and then Java, Indonesia for a while. His third novel, A vége, was published in 2015. It was partly written while he lived in Indonesia.

Bartis has received several awards, including the 1997 Tibor Déry Prize, the 2002 Sándor Márai Prize and the 2005 Attila József Prize. In 2006, he was awarded A Magyar Köztársasági Érdemrend lovagkeresztje. In 2017, he became a member of the Széchenyi Academy of Literature and Arts.

His books have been translated into English, Arabic, French, German, Chinese, Spanish, Portuguese, Turkish, Romanian, Polish, Czech, Croatian, Norwegian, Estonian, Serbian, Dutch, Italian, Slovak, Russian, Macedonian and Uyghur.

=== Photography ===
As a photographer, his photographs have been exhibited in numerous exhibitions. Bartis' first breakthrough in photography was in 1996, when his Az Engelhard-hagyaték photography exhibit was exhibited at the Műcsarnok-Dorottya Galéria in Budapest. The exhibit featured portraits of writers which were paired with portraits of women and each of the twenty-four writers wrote a poem or short story for their respective female portrait. The exhibition was later a success at Literaturhaus in Frankfurt, Germany in 1999. Az Engelhard-hagyaték was also later exhibited at Czuły Barbarzyńca in Warsaw in 2006. In 1998, his Photo Pygmalion exhibit was shown at Vintage Galéria in Budapest.

In 2010, Bartis published a photo-book titled A csöndet úgy, featuring 365 low-resolution photos taken with a mobile phone from January 2005 to December 2008. In 2016, he published a photo-book, titled A világ leírása, részlet, with text by István Kemény. The photos were exhibited at Deák Erika Galéria in Budapest in 2016. In 2018, he published a photo-book, titled A szigeteken, with text by Katharina Narbutovič, Zsolt Petrányi and Attila Szűcs. It was his largest photo-book to date, featuring photographs taken between 2014 and 2017, mostly in Java, around Yogyakarta in Indonesia. The photos were exhibited at Mai Manó Ház in Budapest in 2018.

=== Dramas ===
Bartis adapted Tranquility into a dramatic play, titled Anyám, Kleopátra, which premiered at the National Theatre in Budapest in 2003. The play was directed by Dezső Garas and starred Dorottya Udvaros. Bartis made his debut as a theater director in 2016 and directed his play Rendezés at the National Theatre in Târgu Mureș, Romania. The drama commemorated the victims of the Hungarian Revolution of 1956. It was also presented at the Comedy Theatre of Budapest in 2017.

== Personal life ==
Bartis has lived in Budapest since 1984, and has partly lived in Yogyakarta (Java, Indonesia) since 2014.

He married in 1990. His daughter was born in 1990, and his son was born in 1993.

== Bibliography ==
=== Novels ===
- A séta. Budapest: Balassi Kiadó/József Attila Kör (JAK-füzetek 76). 1995. ISBN 978-963-506-016-0.
- A nyugalom. Budapest: Magvető Könyvkiadó. 2001. ISBN 978-963-14-2251-1.
  - Tranquility. Translated by Goldstein, Imre. Brooklyn: Archipelago Books. 2008. ISBN 978-0-9800330-0-7.
- A vége. Budapest: Magvető Kiadó. 2015. ISBN 978-963-14-3340-1.
  - The End. Translated by Sollosy, Judith. Brooklyn: Archipelago Books. 2023. ISBN 978-1-953861-429.

=== Short story collections ===
- A kéklő pára - Novellák (1995–1998). Budapest: Magvető Könyvkiadó. 1998. ISBN 978-963-14-2118-7.
- A Lázár apokrifek. Budapest: Magvető Könyvkiadó. 2005. ISBN 978-963-14-3404-0.
- Tizenegy novella. 2010.

=== Plays ===
- Anyám, Kleopátra (2002)
- Romlás (2005)
- Rendezés (2013)

=== Non-fiction ===
- Bartis, Attila; Kemény, István (2010). Amiről lehet. Budapest: Magvető Kiadó. ISBN 978-963-14-2702-8.
- Az eltűnt idő nyoma. Budapest: Magvető Kiadó. 2019. ISBN 978-963-14-3880-2.

=== Photo-books ===
- A csöndet úgy. Naplóképek 2005. január – 2008. december. Budapest: Magvető Kiadó. 2010. ISBN 978-963-14-2842-1.
- Bartis, Attila; Kemény, István (2016). A világ leírása, részlet. Budapest: Deák Erika Galéria. ISBN 978-963-12-5159-3.
- Bartis, Attila; Narbutovič, Katharina; Petrányi, Zsolt; Szűcs, Attila (2018). A szigeteken. Budapest: Magvető Kiadó. ISBN 978-963-14-3650-1.

== Exhibitions ==
- Az Engelhard-hagyaték
  - Műcsarnok-Dorottya Galéria, Budapest, 1996
  - Literaturhaus, Frankfurt, 1999
  - Czuły Barbarzyńca, Warsaw, 2006
- Photo Pygmalion
  - Vintage Galéria, Budapest, 1998
- 33 fotográfia
  - Café Eckermann, Goethe Institut, Budapest, 2007
- A világ leírása, részlet
  - Deák Erika Galéria, Budapest, 2016
- A szigeteken
  - Mai Manó Ház, Budapest, 2018

== Adaptations ==
=== Theatre ===
Year	Title	Theatre	Location	Stage director	Ref(s).
2003	Anyám, Kleopátra (adaptation of Anyám, Kleopátra)	National Theatre	Budapest, Hungary	Dezső Garas	
2009	Romlás (adaptation of Romlás)	Comedy Theatre of Budapest	Budapest, Hungary	János Szikora	
2013	Prapadul (adaptation of Romlás)	National Theatre	Iași, Romania	Lucian Dan Teodorovici	
2014	Meine Mutter, Kleopatra! (adaptation of A nyugalom)	Lower Austrian State Theatre	St. Pölten, Austria	Róbert Alföldi	
2015	A nyugalom (adaptation of A nyugalom and Anyám, Kleopátra)	National Theatre	Târgu Mureș, Romania	Afrim Radu	
2016	Rendezés (adaptation of Rendezés)	National Theatre	Târgu Mureș, Romania	Attila Bartis	
2017	Rendezés (adaptation of Rendezés)	Comedy Theatre of Budapest	Budapest, Hungary	Rémusz Szikszai	

=== Film ===
Year	Title	Director	Ref(s).
2008	Nyugalom (ad. of A nyugalom)	Róbert Alföldi	

== Awards and honours ==
- 1997: Tibor Déry Prize
- 2002: Sándor Márai Prize
- 2005: Attila József Prize
- 2006: Knight's Cross of the Order of Merit of the Republic of Hungary
- 2009: Award For Hungarian Art
- 2009: Best Translated Book Award (for Tranquility)
- 2010: Ernő Szép Award (for Romlás)
- 2016: Libri Literary Audience Award (for A vége)
- 2018: Magyarország Babérkoszorúja díjat

=== Scholarships ===
- 1995: Zsigmond Móricz Fellowship
- 1996: Hungarian Soros Foundation Literary Scholarship
- 1997, 1999, 2003: National Cultural Fund Literary Scholarship
- 1998, 1999, 2001: József Pécsi Photography Scholarship
- 2000: Péter Horváth Literary Scholarship
- 2002: István Örkény Playwrights Grant
- 2005: Szolnok Szigligeti Theatre Playwright Scholarship
- 2006: Literary Colloquium Berlin Residency Scholarship
- 2006: Hungarian Cultural Institute, Warsaw Artist Grant
- 2007–2008: DAAD Artists-in-Berlin Program
- 2010: Shanghai Writing Program
- 2012: Tianjin Binhai New Area International Writing Program
- 2013–2014: Landis+Gyr Literary Scholarship, Berlin
- 2014: DAAD Re-invitation Grant
