= Edit Balázsovits =

Hungarian actress

- Born: 13 June 1975 (age 51); Budapest, Hungary
- Education: University of Theatre and Film Arts (1997)
- Occupations: Actress; singer
- Spouse: József Fürstner (m. 2004)
- Children: 1

Edit Balázsovits (born 13 June 1975) is a Jászai Mari Award winning Hungarian actress and singer. She starred in numerous plays, TV dramas and films, as well as many major international productions. In 2008, she was presented the Kornay Mariann-Award.

== Early life ==
=== Childhood and parental influence ===
Born to an actor family in 1975, with father Lajos Balazsovits (Nagykanizsa, 4 December 1946–), Balázs Béla-Award-winning Hungarian actor, theatre director and theatre manager, meritorious artist. Her mother is Éva Almási (Budapest, 5 June 1942–) Kossuth- and Jászai Mari-Award-winning actress, meritorious and honorary artist.

== Education and career ==
Edit Balázsovits graduated from Városmajor Secondary Grammar School in 1993, then went on to earn her degree at the University of Theatre and Film Arts (1997), after which she had been a member of the Comedy Theatre of Budapest. Her first leading role was as an actress at the Comedy Theatre of Budapest in the fourth year of her university studies, she played the role of Natasa Rosztova in Tolstoy's War and Peace. After 2001, she became a freelance artist. She often worked together with her mother and father. In Popfestival 40, the 40th anniversary production of An Imaginary Report on an American Rock Festival (Comedy Theatre of Budapest, 2013) she played the same role as her mother did before her.

Her first television role was as a child in an episode of The Family Circle television series. Thanks to her fluency in English, she acted in many foreign television dramas and films shot in Hungary (A Good Day to Die Hard, 2013; Borgias, 2013; Silent Witness, 1996 – BBC series). She is also known as a dubbing actress, doing voice-over for many successful films. In 2008, she was awarded the Kornay Mariann Artistic Award for playing the role of Victoria in the musical comedy of Home and Beauty. Her life's work is acknowledged by her trade, in 2009, she won a Jászai Mari Award. Music has always been an important part of her life, in 2009 she produced a special album entitled New Republic songs, where she sang songs written especially for her by the band Republic. After the release of the album, she toured for nearly a year with the band.

== Private life ==
She married Dr József Fürstner in 2004. Her son Richard was born in 2005.

== Awards ==
Kornay Mariann Award (2008) Jászai Mari Award (2009)

== Major theatre roles ==
- Alexander Breffort – Marguerite Monnot: Irma La Douce (IRMA) – Pince Theatre, 2013 dir.: Daniel Dicső
- Ferenc Molnár: The Devil (ELZA TÓTH) – Karinthy Theatre, 2013 dir.: Tamás Balikó
- Popfestival 40 (ESZTER) – Comedy Theatre of Budapest, 2013 dir.: Enikő Eszenyi
- Sandor Hunyadi: Lovagias ügy (BABA) – Karinthy Theatre, 2012 dir.: István Verebes
- Ferenc Herczeg: The Blue Fox (CECIL) – Játékszín, 2012 dir.: Lajos Balázsovits
- Carlo Collodi: Pinocchio (THE FAIRY WITH TURQUOISE HAIR) – Madách Theatre, 2011 dir.: Kati Pesty-Nagy
- Robert Harling: Steel Magnolias (SHELBY) – Játékszín, 2013 dir.: György Korcsmáros
- Molière: George Dandin, or the Confounded Husband (CLAUDINE), Játékszín 2008 dir.: Péter Telihay
- William Somerset Maugham: Home and Beauty (VICTORIA), Játékszín 2008 dir.: Lajos Balázsovits
- Neil Simon: Barefoot in the Park (CORIE BRATTER), Játékszín 2007 dir.: Lajos Balázsovits
- Doris Dörrie: Happy (EMILIA), Játékszín 2004 dir.: Lajos Balázsovits
- János Ács: Casanova Nuova (YOUNG ACTRESS), Jozsef Katona Theatre Kecskemet 2004 dir.: János Ács
- Gábor Vaszary-Szabolcs Fényes-Istvan Szenes: Bubus (KLÁRIKA), Játékszín 2004 dir.: Lajos Balázsovits
- Publius Ovidius Naso: Children of Gods (Scenes from Metamorphoses), Comedy Theatre of Budapest 2003 dir.: Géza D. Hegedűs
- John Osborne: Angry Young Men (ALISON), Thália Theatre 2003 dir.: Éva Almási
- Cander-Ebb: Cabaret (SALLY BOWLES), Budapest Operetta and Musical Theatre 2002 dir.: Róbert Alföldi
- Mark Ravenhill: Shopping and Fucking (LULU), Thália Theatre 2002 dir.: Róbert Alföldi
- Ronald Harwood: The Dresser (IRENE), Játékszín 2002 dir.: Lajos Balázsovits
- Dostoevsky: Crime and Punishment (DUNYA), Comedy Theatre of Budapest 2001 dir.: Géza Tordy
- Shakespeare: Love's Labour's Lost (MARIA), Comedy Theatre of Budapest 2000 dir.: László Keszég
- Caryl Churghill: The Skriker (JOSIE), Comedy Theatre of Budapest 2000 dir.: Sándor Zsótér
- Daphne du Maurier: Rebecca (MRS. DE WINTER), Játékszín 1999 dir.: Károly Makk
- Dostoevsky: The Brothers Karamazov (KATERINA), Comedy Theatre of Budapest 1999 dir.: János Szikora
- Shakespeare: The Tempest (MIRANDA), Comedy Theatre of Budapest 1999 dir.: Róbert Alföldi
- Ben Elton: Popcorn (VELVET), Comedy Theatre of Budapest 1998 dir.: László Marton
- Carlo Collodi: Pinocchio (THE FAIRY WITH TURQUOISE HAIR), Hungarian Theatre of Pest 1998 dir.: Balázs Simon
- Kern-Presser: 14 St Steven Boulevard, Comedy Theatre of Budapest 1998 dir.: László Marton
- Arthur Miller: The Crucible (SUSANNA WALCOTT), Comedy Theatre of Budapest 1998 dir.: Péter Rudolf
- Trembalay: The Sisters-in-law (LINDA LAUZON), Hungarian Theatre of Pest 1997 dir.: Géza D. Hegedűs
- Euripides: The Pheadra-story (ARICIA), Comedy Theatre of Budapest 1997 dir.: Róbert Alföldi
- Mrozek: Tango (ALA), Hungarian Theatre of Pest 1997 dir.: Géza D. Hegedűs
- Ede Szigligeti: Young Lilly (MARISKA), Castle Theatre of Gyula 1997 dir.: Tamás Balikó
- Endre Fejes: Good night summer, good night love (HŰVÖSNÉ KRISZ), Ódry Stage 1997 dir.: Imre Csiszár
- Friedrich Schiller: The Robbers (AMALIA), Ódry Stage1996 dir.: Géza D. Hegedűs
- Kipling-László Dés- Pál Békés: The Book of the Jungle, 1996, Hungarian Theatre of Pest dir.: Géza D. Hegedűs
- Tolstoy-Piscator: War and Peace (NATASA ROSTOVA), Comedy Theatre of Budapest 1996 dir.: Péter Valló
- Pál Békés: Össztánc, Comedy Theatre of Budapest 1994 dir.: László Marton

== Film and television roles ==
- A Good Day to Die Hard (2013) – supporting role
- Borgias (2013) – supporting role
- Casting everything (2007) dir.: Péter Tímár
- One human minute (2007) dir.: Zoltán Verebes
- The abduction of the sabine women – TV drama (dir: Péter Valló)
- T?ICK – short film (2003) dir.: Pater Sparrow
- Az Egérút (2001) dir: Júlia Sára
- "A boldogság felé indultam én..."(2002) – poetry television series
- Silent Witness (1996) – English (BBC) series,
- The Sixes dir.: István Verebes– cabaret series
- 100 years of cabaret dir.: István Verebes– television series

== Dubbing roles ==
- The Skin Game [1931] – dir.: Alfred Hitchcock
- Taras Bulba [1962] – dir.: J. Lee Thompson
- To Sir, with Love [1967] – dir.: James Clavell
- Curse of the Pink Panther [1983] – dir.: Blake Edwards
- The Crossing Guard [1995] – dir.: Sean Penn
- Les Couloirs du temps: Les visiteurs 2 [1998] – dir.: Jean-Marie Poiré
- Dr T and the Women [2000] – dir.: Robert Altman
- Love's Labour's Lost [2000] – dir.: Kenneth Branagh
- Coyote Ugly [2000] – dir.: David McNally
- Return to Me [2000] – dir.: Bonnie Hunt
- Crazy/Beautiful [2001] – dir.: John Stockwell
- Valentine [2001] – dir.: Jamie Blanks
- Two Weeks Notice [2002] – dir.: Marc Lawrence
- The Transporter [2002] – dir.: Louis Leterrier, Corey Yuen
- Alien Hunter [2003] – dir.: Ron Krauss
- The Bridge of San Luis Rey [2004] – dir.: Mary McGuckian

== Singer ==
New Republic Songs (2009) CD/studio album – EMI/Capitol An Imaginary Report on an American Rock Festival (1998) CD/cover album – BMG Ariola /Vinnélek, vinnélek... – Edit Balázsovits, Péter Novák
