= A padlás =

A padlás (The Attic)
- félig mese – félig musical (half tale – half musical)
- Cast album
- Music: Gábor Presser
- Lyrics: Dusán Sztevanovity
- Book: Dusán Sztevanovity; Péter Horváth
- Setting: an attic in Budapest in the late 1980s
- Premiere: 29 January 1988: Comedy Theatre of Budapest

A padlás (Hungarian: [ɒ ˈpɒdlaːʃ]; English: The Attic) is a Hungarian musical with music by Gábor Presser and lyrics by Dusán Sztevanovity. The musical also contains additional text by Péter Horváth. It premiered in the Comedy Theatre, Budapest on 29 January 1988, directed by László Marton. In addition to its continuing successful performance there, it has also been performed in several other Hungarian theatres, as well as in other countries. The musical tells the story of a burglary, of two young people in love, and of four ghosts looking for the other world.

== History ==
Gábor Presser and Dusán Stevanovity wrote A padlás during the summer of 1986 in their retreat house in Zsennye. They had gone there to write new songs for a children's television program and for a new album of Sztevanovity's brother, Zorán Sztevanovity, which were not finished at that time. Presser later claimed that the role of Rádiós was written originally for Attila Kaszás. While they were working on the musical, the mother of Zsuzsa Radnóti (who also helped them) often cooked Hungarian Plum Dumplings (Hung: szilvás gombóc) for them, which served as the basis for writing one of the most popular songs of the musical, Szilvásgombóc. The reading was on 30 November 1987. The director was László Marton who had worked with both of the writers. Péter Horváth, included in the production on Marton's suggestion, helped with the prosaic parts.

Due to the financial problems of the Comedy Theatre, the set was made by Miklós Fehér out of the sets of previous shows. The only original part was the supercomputer Robinson. The music also had to be recorded. The model room for the set was Sztevanovity's study. The magic book used in the musical was designed by Ernő Rubik. The director's concept focused not on spectacle (which is common in this genre), but instead on poetic intimacy, human portrayals and the mixture of the fairy world and the reality. The choreographer was György Gesler and the costume designer was Márta Jánoskúti.

At the very beginning Péter Müller also worked with the other authors, but later he seceded and started his own fairy musical at Madách Theatre. This is musical Doctor Herz by composer László Tolcsvay and lyricist János Bródy. Sztevanovity sued Müller for "unauthorised reuse of his ideas and synopsis", which ended in an agreement out of court. The premiere of Doctor Herz was held one week after the one of A padlás.

A padlás became the most popular and most successful musical in the history of the Comedy Theatre with the greatest performance number. The play was also shown in other Hungarian cities, such as Eger, Kecskemét, Nyíregyháza, Szeged, Székesfehérvár, Veszprém, Esztergom, Szigetszentmiklós, Miskolc, Zalaegerszeg and Kassa. The musical also debuted in other countries.

In 2008, when the musical was 20 years old, a jubilee performance was held with a new cast and a new booklet was published, in which Sztevonivity writes about the message of the musical:

Twenty years later I confess: with A padlás I just wanted to say, that T. Müllers – some of whom are always in our world – can destroy, lie and cheat as much as possible, but can never win. Never until there are Mamókas either in reality or in our memories. Although it was painful to say goodbye my grandma, my father, their heritage – the feeling of togetherness is the source of everything good in my life.

The musical and several of its songs became hits in Hungary, namely Szilvásgombóc [Plum Dumplings], Kell egy hely [There Must Be a Place] or Fényév távolság [Light Year Distance].

== Synopsis ==
=== Act I ===
The musical begins with the arrival of four ghosts (Kölyök [a boy], Meglökő [a deaf-mute executioner], Herceg [a prince], Lámpás [a dwarf]) to the attic. Lámpás doubts if it is the place where Révész, the ferryman should arrive to bring them to the star of "eternal beauty", but Herceg is certain he is correct (Itt vagyunk [Nyitány]) [Here We Are (Overture)]. They try to call the Révész two times (Ég és föld között) [Between Land and Sky]. While Lámpás and Herceg are arguing, Meglökő notices Barrabás coming from the dormer door with a clock. They think that he is Révész, but soon realise that they were wrong because he can't see them and they learn that he is a wanted gangster.

Everyone hides when Mamóka, an old lady living in the house, arrives to the attic. She complains about not having grandchildren (Mit ér egy nagymama unokák nélkül) (What Is a Grandma Worth Without Grandchildren). The ghosts come back from their hiding places, however it turns out that Mamóka can see them. She thinks that they are the friends of her son, Rádiós, and Rádiós arriving from the roof thinks that they are the guests of Mamóka. Rádiós turns his supercomputer, Robinson on, which identifies the ghosts. They explain to the surprised Rádiós that they can be seen by those "whose hearts are as honest and clean as a child's". They tell their stories in song (Ez ő, ez ő) [It's Him, It's Him] but Rádiós still can't believe.

Témüller, the janitor comes to the attic to question the new antennae set up by Rádiós (Enyém a pálya) [It's My Field]. Rádiós has to accept the ghosts' arguments because Témüller can't see them. Témüller is packed off and Mamóka also leaves.

Rádiós uses Robinson to find out the purposes of the ghosts. It identifies the hiding Barrabás, who gets behind Rádiós and knocks him down and escapes through the dormer door. Süni, the neighbour girl comes to the attic. Robinson tells her what has happened. Rádiós – after Süni tells him ghosts don't exist – "doesn't want to come to his senses". Süni wants to send the ghosts away but they tell her that the attic is the first place where they haven't been sent away from. In the meantime Rádiós wakes up. That is why the attic is the Attic where the Révész arrives to bring them to the star of "eternal beauty" (Valahol [Örökre szépek I.]) [Somewhere (Eternal Beauty I.)]. Rádiós successfully sets up a connection with the Révész with the help of Robinson (Rádióüzenetek) [Radio Messages]. The connection breaks when Barrabás reappears on the roof and is shot down.

Révész arrives in the body of Barrabás and greets the ghosts. Rádiós (confusing him with the gangster) knocks him down and trusses him up. Before Üteg arrives Barrabás is hidden and the ghosts go to the cubbyhole. Detektív and Témüller searching for Barrabás come with Üteg, the second of Detektív. They say that Barrabás didn't reach the ground after falling. Süni and Rádiós manage to make up an alibi with the help of Robinson. Before leaving, Deketív declares that the building is surrounded. Then Révész explains that he is a beginner ferryman who wanted to try being human so that he moved into the body of Barrabás. He promises to leave his human form at dawn because that is when "the time comes" and they "start off" to the planet of "eternal beauty" (Örökre szépek II.) [Eternal Beauty II.], and at last Rádiós also learns its significance.

Mamóka arrives to the attic, who finds Révész and offers him Hungarian Plum Dumplings. They start to eat and think (Szilvásgombóc) [Plum Dumplings]. When Detektív, Üteg and Témüller come the guests hide again but the gun of the gangster remains in the hand of Mamóka who admits doing everything. Detektív want to arrest them but he doesn't manage because the ghosts help Mamóka, Süni and Rádiós (Varázskönyv [I. felv. finálé]) [Magic Book (Act One Finale)].

=== Act II ===
At the beginning of Act II, you can hear the announcement of the police: there is ten minutes moratorium left before they storm the attic. Süni unsuccessfully tries to attract Rádiós's attention (Nem szólnak a csillagok) [Stars Are Silent]. Rádiós realises that the antenna terminal went wrong but when he tries to go up to the roof, the police starts shooting. Süni leaves the attic. The ghosts and Révész come up the idea of bringing Rádiós with them to the past-planet. Rádiós refuses the offer because of his work and dreams here on Earth (Fényév távolság) [Light Year Distance].

Révész understands the weight of his acts and tries to leave his body but he starts to fear. He drinks from the bottle of rum he found in the pocket of Barrabás. His last wish is to dance (Utána repülünk) [After That We Fly Away]. The helicopters of the police begin to demolish the attic, which can be stopped only by the ghosts. Süni, dressed as a clown, appears on the roof and keeps the police busy while reconnecting the antenna (Valaki hamisan énekel) [Someone Is Out of Tune]. Rádiós makes a snow storm with the help of Robinson, so the helicopters have to withdraw.

The time comes for the ghosts, so they say goodbye to Rádiós and Süni. Révész leaves through the dormer door and the others promise that they'll never forget each other. Kölyök asks for Radios's headset so that they could communicate but Rádiós explains that this is impossible because of the distance. Herceg gives his magic book to Süni and whispers Rádiós that he should kiss Süni. The ghosts leave the attic (Örökre szépek III.) [Eternal Beauty III.].

Üteg is let down from a helicopter, and they at first mistake him for a new ferryman. He tells them that there is a bomb in the attic which was brought in by Barrabás and will explode in four minutes. Rádiós finds the clock and they guess that that is the bomb. Üteg can't defuse it because he is in shock. Rádiós sends the others away but Süni insists on staying. Üteg has no time to explain how to defuse the bomb while escaping. On the magic book's advice he chooses a wire with closed eyes. Rádiós and Süni think that they are dead and they call Révész, however, Robinson tells them that the attic didn't explode, the defusing was successful.

Rádiós realises that he loves Süni (Csupa-csupa-padlás) [Only-Only-Attics (Love Duet)]. Üteg, Detektív, Témüller and Süni come to the attic. Detektív arrests Témüller "for multiple misleadings of the police, implication of innocents (and insulting older women)" because the dead body of Barrabás was found under the police car of Detektív. He also promotes Üteg for defusing the bomb. Üteg leaves with Témüller and Detektív asks Rádiós if he could return some time, then leaves.

Mamóka looks for the ghosts, but only the ghost of Barrabás appears from the crate whose personality is amending. He asks for the help of Rádiós. At the end everyone sings together (Finálé) [Finale].

== Characters ==
Original Cast
Character	Actor
Rádiós	Attila Kaszás
Süni	Éva Igó
Mamóka	Nóra Tábori
Barrabás	Géza Hegedűs D.
Révész	Géza Hegedűs D.
Ghosts:
Herceg	László Méhes
Törpe (Lámpás)	Péter Rudolf
Kölyök	Erika Pápai
Meglökő	Géza Rácz
Témüller	Péter Balázs
Detektív	Péter Vallai
Üteg	Zoltán Seress
Robinson, the machine	András Sipos

Rádiós ([ˈraːdioːʃ]; Sparks), who is simply fantastic: cyberneticist, fired from the state office in 1986, because he tried to get in touch with alien planets and extraterrestrial beings without permission. Currently he is a freelancer, i.e. he is developing his supercomputer, Robinson. He hardly recognises that he loves someone other than Mamóka and the attic, as well – Süni.

Süni ([ˈʃyni]; Hedgehog), young girl, who studies playing the violin: she was born on 20 May 1970, studies at the Academy of Music, and lives next to Rádiós. She has fallen in love with him, but he seems not to recognise her. Eventually she works wonders, and Rádiós comes to know his actual surroundings on Earth. She saves the attic with her heroism, and attracts Rádiós's attention.

Mamóka ([ˈmɒmoːkɒ]; Grandma), old lady, who knows everything about people: the mother of Rádiós, but she doesn't have any grandchildren, although she would like to have. She can cook especially delicious Hungarian Plum Dumplings. Eventually everybody becomes like grandchildren to her.

Barrabás B. Barrabás ([ˈbɒrrɒbaːʃ ˈbeː]), the gangster: he was born on March 26, 1963, and is a bomb expert. He breaks into the attic, and starts the conflict of the play. After his death the personality of his ghost amends.

Révész ([ˈreːveːs]; Ferryman), whose guise is identical to the one of Barrabás only: beginner ferryman, who (against the rules) would like to try what being a human is like. His job is to bring the ghosts from the Earth to the planet of "eternal beauty". He learns several aspects of being human before the time comes, and starts his journey with the four ghosts back to "eternal beauty".

Herceg ([ˈhɛrt͡sɛɡ]; Prince), gentle ghost, 500-year-old: collateral prince of Lombardy, born in 1488. He had a wager with another prince on which of them will manage to wake up the Sleeping Beauty. He sang all of his magical songs, but the other woke her up with a kiss. According to the wager he had to die.

Kölyök ([ˈkøjøk]; Boy), naïve ghost, 530-year-old: when the king marched nude before his people, he was the one who had the bravery to mention it first. Because of this he was sentenced to death. His name is no longer remembered. (This character is usually played by women).

Lámpás ([ˈlaːmpaːʃ]; Illuminator), often Törpe ([ˈtørpɛ]; Dwarf), the dwarf, crabby ghost, 670-year-old: miner, born on 7 April 1318. He was on guard to protect his seven mates, but when Snow White arrived they forgot him.

Meglökő ([ˈmɛɡløkøː]; Executioner), giant ghost, 560-year-old, deaf-mute: good-hearted executioner, who tried to protect the wrongly sentenced Kölyök with his body, but both of them died instead.

Témüller ([ˈteːmyllɛr]), previously janitor, currently volunteer: he swore to prove that Rádiós and his company are hiding the criminal Barrabás and tries to use his connections to do so. His idea is equality, he is the symbol of the communism. At the end he is arrested for imputation of innocents and insulting older women.

Detektív ([ˈdɛtɛktiːv]; Detective), who can even detect himself: he is responsible for catching Barrabás B. Barrabás. This is temporarily impeded by that "he stood over Barrabás's dead body with his police car."

Üteg ([ˈytɛɡ]; Battery), the second left hand of Detektív: bomb expert (that is why he is afraid of them). He won 14 police championships in target shooting. He shot Barrabás. At the end he is promoted.

Robinson ([ˈrobinzon]), the machine: the supercomputer built by Rádiós, and which also has feelings. According to the definition of its maker it is a tentative communication device, because it can set up connection with extraterrestrial beings, and it can also be used for weather regulation. It helps to save the attic with its logic, it can recognise everybody immediately and provide detailed information about them from its database. It can dance and even cry. Moreover, it can talk about miracles (which is quite rare with computers).

== List of musical numbers ==
Act 1

1. "Itt vagyunk (Nyitány)" [Here We Are (Overture)] — Kölyök, Herceg, Törpe (Lámpás), Meglökő
2. "Ég és föld között" [Between Land and Sky] — Kölyök, Herceg, Törpe (Lámpás), Meglökő
3. "Mit ér egy nagymama unokák nélkül" [What Is a Grandma Worth Without Grandchildren] — Mamóka
4. "Ez ő, ez ő" [It's Him, It's Him] — Kölyök, Herceg, Törpe (Lámpás), Meglökő
5. "Enyém a pálya" [It's My Field] — Témüller
6. "Valahol (Örökre szépek I.)" [Somewhere (Eternal Beauty I.)] — Kölyök
7. "Rádióüzenetek" [Radio Messages] — Rádiós, Kölyök, Herceg, Törpe (Lámpás), Meglökő
8. "Örökre szépek II." [Eternal Beauty II.] — Révész, Rádiós
9. "Szilvásgombóc" [Plum Dumplings] — Mamóka, Révész, Herceg, Süni, Rádiós, Kölyök, Törpe (Lámpás), Meglökő
10. "Varázskönyv (I. felv. finálé)" [Magic Book (Act One Finale)] — Rádiós, Süni, Révész, Kölyök, Herceg, Törpe (Lámpás), Meglökő

Act 2

1. "Nem szólnak a csillagok" [Stars Are Silent] — Süni, Rádiós
2. "Fényév távolság" [Light Year Distance] — Rádiós
3. "Utána repülünk" [After That We Fly Away] — Révész, Kölyök, Herceg, Meglökő, Törpe (Lámpás), Süni, Rádiós
4. "Valaki hamisan énekel" [Someone Is Out of Tune] — Süni
5. "Örökre szépek III." [Eternal Beauty III.] — Kölyök, Herceg, Törpe (Lámpás), Meglökő
6. "Csupa-csupa-padlás" [Only-Only-Attics (Love Duet)] — Süni, Rádiós
7. "Finálé" [Finale] — everybody

== Time and space ==
The musical is entirely set in the attic and on its roof. The attic is located in Budapest. It stands ″between land and sky", there is "terrible mess" thanks to Rádiós, who lives there. Its other permanent inhabitant is Robinson. There are three ways to get into the attic: from downstairs, from the attic of the neighbour's house (Süni's house) and from the dormer door on the roof. The attic also contains a cubbyhole usually used for hiding. The importance of the attic is that the Révész arrives there to bring the ghosts to the past-planet of "eternal beauty", it is a port. The planet of memories has a great significance in the play. The ghosts are searching for the attic since centuries because they want to leave with the Révész. The planet of "eternal beauty" means the afterlife, and not complete death. Here the late mortal enters the world of their most beautiful memories beyond the sunset, the lights and their dreams, the past comes to life, they meet with their late beloved, the lost objects get animated, the burnt candles burst into flames one more time and they dive into the timeless happiness. However, only those can travel to the past-planet who or what are remembered on Earth by some. From this place there's no return, no message. Even the light cannot leave it.

The plot – although the ages of the ghosts were changed to fit to the passing years, and the dates heard onstage were geared to the actual date – is set in 1988 in the last years of the Communist Era. Lampás refers to the month in one of his lines: "snow storm in August?!" The musical takes place overnight. The plots of the acts are continuous, the actions are real time, but during the intermission some time is skipped.

== Recordings ==
A padlás

Studio album by Gábor Presser & Dusán Sztevanovity
- Released: 1988 (LP); 1993 (CD/MC)
- Recorded: 1988
- Genre: musical
- Length: 49:21
- Label: Hungaroton-Gong Kft.

The financial state of the Comedy Theatre forced Presser to record the musical parts playing on all of the instruments himself – the theatre couldn't pay an orchestra, neither for the performances nor for the recordings. Presser made also the orchestration, and István Kiss made the recording and the electronic programs. It was released in the same year the musical premiered on LP. It was re-released in 1993 on CD and MC. The B side of the MC contained the instrumental version of all of the songs. Both the CD and the MC contained a booklet with the lyrics of the musical based on the original manuscript. It differs a bit from the ones heard on the recordings and in the theatre.

=== LP ===
At the time of the original LP release the order of the songs was not completed, so that the LP contains not all of the songs, not in chronological order and sometimes not with the final title (in the latter case the final title is also represented with small letters). These were all fixed on the CD release.

All lyrics are written by Dusán Sztevanovity; all music is composed by Gábor Presser

No.	Title	Length
1.	"Itt vagyunk (Nyitány)"	5:07
2.	"Varázskönyv" (Finálé)	4:06
3.	"Fényév távolság"	3:18
4.	"Ez ő, ez ő"	3:17
5.	"Valahol (Örökre szépek)" (Valahol (Örökre szépek I.))	1:35
6.	"Mit ér egy nagymama unokák nélkül"	2:35
7.	"Csupa-csoda-padlás" (Csupa-csupa-padlás)	2:13
8.	"Szilvásgombóc"	1:58
9.	"Örökre szépek" (Örökre szépek II.)	2:59
10.	"Rádióüzenetek"	3:55
11.	"Enyém a pálya"	2:21
12.	"Utána repülünk"	1:58
13.	"Nem szólnak a csillagok"	2:59
14.	"Ég és föld között"	2:09
Total length:		40:58

Songs Varázskönyv (I. felv. finálé), Valaki hamisan énekel and Örökre szépek III. were not included.

=== CD ===
All lyrics are written by Dusán Sztevanovity; all music is composed by Gábor Presser

No.	Title	Length
1.	"Itt vagyunk (Nyitány)"	5:07
2.	"Ég és föld között"	2:09
3.	"Mit ér egy nagymama unokák nélkül"	2:35
4.	"Ez ő, ez ő"	3:17
5.	"Enyém a pálya"	2:21
6.	"Valahol (Örökre szépek I.)"	1:35
7.	"Rádióüzenetek"	3:55
8.	"Örökre szépek II."	2:59
9.	"Szilvásgombóc"	1:58
10.	"Varázskönyv (I. felv. finálé)"	3:42
11.	"Nem szólnak a csillagok"	2:59
12.	"Fényév távolság"	3:18
13.	"Utána repülünk"	1:58
14.	"Valaki hamisan énekel" (by Süni)	2:15
15.	"Örökre szépek III."	2:26
16.	"Csupa-csupa-padlás"	2:13
17.	"Finálé"	4:06
Total length:		49:21
