= Tranquility (novel) =

2001 novel by Attila Bartis

- Author: Attila Bartis
- Audio read by: Ernő Fekete
- Original title: A nyugalom
- Translator: Imre Goldstein
- Language: Hungarian
- Genre: Tragedy
- Set in: Budapest during the decline of Communist Hungary
- Publisher: Magvető
- Publication date: 2001
- Publication place: Hungary
- English publication date: September 2008 (Archipelago Books)
- Media type: Print (hardcover)
- Pages: 326
- Awards: Best Translated Book Award (2009)
- ISBN: 978-963-14-2251-1
- LC Class: PH3213.B2976 N94 2001

Tranquility (Hungarian: A nyugalom) is a 2001 novel by Attila Bartis, published by Magvető. His second novel, Tranquility is considered Bartis's most famous work. Set in communist-era Budapest, Tranquility is a psychological novel about a writer and his dysfunctional relationship with his mother and two other women, and is noted for its bleak storyline and its vulgar depictions of violence and sexual activity. Tranquility was adapted into film, titled Nyugalom (2008), directed by Róbert Alföldi. Originally published in Hungarian by Magvető, it was later translated into English by Imre Goldstein and published in 2008 by Archipelago Books. It was the first time Bartis's work had been translated into English. Goldstein's translation won the Best Translated Book Award (2009).

As of 2019, Tranquility has been translated into Spanish, Bulgarian, Polish, German, Romanian, Turkish, English, Estonian, Swedish, Czech, Dutch, Chinese, Russian, Italian, Portuguese and Arabic.

== Plot ==
In final years of the communist Hungarian People's Republic, writer Andor Weér–the novel's narrator–lives in dysfunction with his mother, Rebeka Weér. Rebeka is a former celebrated actress who has not left their Budapest apartment in fifteen years. Andor's father was a theatre critic and a former member of the ÁVH secret police who defected to the West after the 1956 revolution. Andor's twin sister, Judit, a talented violinist, fled Hungary fifteen years earlier. This betrayal and Rebeka's inability to lure Judit back to Hungary caused the authorities to deny Rebeka leading stage roles. Rebeka performs a symbolic burial of Judit and refused to go outside of their apartment. Judit committed suicide, but Andor keeps her death a secret and sends letters to Rebeka in her name. Rebeka is a crazed woman who has a strong emotional hold over Andor that verges on Oedipal. He wishes to escape his mother's maniacal control, but worries about leaving her alone. Andor quickly falls in love with Eszter Fehé, a troubled young Romanian woman with a mysterious past. The two met on the Liberty Bridge. Eszter helps Andor type his works and get a publishing deal for his book. The editor of the publisher is an older woman who Andor eventually begins a crude sexual and Oedipal relationship with. He later learns the woman was his father's mistress when his father was an agent of the secret police. Andor's love for Eszter is further complicated by her past. The novel begins with Rebeka's funeral, and progresses through the past with a nonlinear narrative structure.

== Reception ==
Writing in the Winter 2002 edition of World Literature Today, Clara Györgyey praised the novel, writing, "Bartis's synthesizing energy, the way he brings together ancient myths and "soc-real" outrages, archetypal emotions with slick contemporary manipulations, transfigures reason into a waking dream (à la Péter Nádas) or nightmare." She also praised the novel's "deftly evoked mood, the perpetually depressing atmosphere, and the rhythm of the poignant metaphors". However, she criticized the novel's "several unwarranted cliches, inadequate explanations, incomplete thoughts, surplus inerstion, and even minor sophomoric idiocies," but concluded that these "stylistic gimmicks" do not reduce the novel's "overall impact".

Complete Review called the novel "an interesting and very vivid psychological study, with some impressive scenes, but also some very difficult-to-take characters."

Tom McGonigle of the Los Angeles Times wrote, "Bartis creates an atmosphere of believability in this novel without forsaking the use of irony."

Publishers Weekly gave the novel a favourable review, writing, "Oddly beautiful and unsettling, the novel boldly illustrates the lengths people go to in securing their own private hells."

The novel has also been reviewed in Le Figaro, Frankfurter Allgemeine Zeitung, Die Zeit, Deutschlandfunk, Der Freitag, Chronic'art and Hungarian Literature Online.

== Adaptations ==
=== Film ===
Tranquility was adapted into a film, Nyugalom (2008), directed by Róbert Alföldi and starring Dorottya Udvaros, Zalán Makranczi, Dorka Gryllus and Judit Hernádi.

It was also adapted into a television film, A nyugalom (2006), by director Mária Vízi.

=== Theatre ===
Bartis adapted Tranquility into a dramatic play, titled Anyám, Kleopátra, which premiered at the National Theatre in Budapest in 2003. The play was directed by Dezső Garas and starred Dorottya Udvaros.

== Publication history ==
- A nyugalom (in Hungarian). Budapest: Magvető Könyvkiadó. 2001. ISBN 978-963-14-2251-1.
- La calma (in Spanish). Translated by Kovacsics, Adan [in Spanish]. Barcelona: Acantilado. 2003. ISBN 978-84-96136-16-8.
- Покоят (in Bulgarian). Translated by Hristov, Martin. Sofia: Издателство Ерго. 2004. ISBN 9549139026.
- Spokój (in Polish). Translated by Górecka, Anna. Warsaw: Wydawnictwo W.A.B. 2005. ISBN 978-83-7414-112-3.
- Die Ruhe (in German). Translated by Relle, Agnes. Frankfurt am Main: Suhrkamp Verlag. 2005. ISBN 978-3-518-41682-2.
- Tihna (in Romanian). Translated by Pop, Anamaria [in Hungarian]. Piteşti: Paralela 45. 2006. ISBN 978-973-697-677-3.
- Sessizlik (in Turkish). Translated by Yağcı Aksel, Sevgi Can. Turkey: Destek Yayınları. 2007. ISBN 978-9944-298-02-5.
- Tranquility. Translated by Goldstein, Imre. Brooklyn: Archipelago Books. 2008. ISBN 978-0-9800330-0-7.
- Rahu (in Estonian). Translated by Eesmaa, Lauri. Tallinn: Eesti Keele Sihtasutus. 2009. ISBN 978-9985-79-280-3.
- Stillheten (in Swedish). Translated by Gustafsson, Daniel. Stockholm: Norstedts. 2009. ISBN 978-91-1-301860-7.
- Klid (in Czech). Translated by Horváthová, Kateřina. Zlín: Kniha Zlín. 2010. ISBN 978-80-87162-26-2.
- Rust (in Dutch). Translated by Suto, Cora-Lisa. Amsterdam: J.M. Meulenhoff. 2011. ISBN 978-90-290-8710-0.
- 宁静海 (in Chinese). Translated by Zemin, Yu. Beijing: People's Literature Publishing House. 2011. ISBN 978-7-02-008172-1.
- "Спокойствие". Иностранная литература (in Russian). No. 9. Translated by Анисимовой, Дарьи. Moscow. 2011. pp. 3–190. ISSN 0130-6545.
- Tranquillità (in Italian). Translated by Rényi, Andrea; Ciccariello, Francesca. Rome: Atmosphere libri. 2012. ISBN 978-88-6564-024-1.
- A tranquilidade (in Portuguese). Translated by Abeling, Cláudia. Rio de Janeiro: Editora Record. 2012. ISBN 978-85-01-08179-7.
- د عبدالله عبدالعاطي النجار, ed. (2019). السكينة (in Arabic). Translated by نافع معلا. Kuwait City: National Council for Culture, Arts and Letters. ISBN 978-99906-0-647-8.
