= Albert Alföldi =

Hungarian folk writer and politician (1939–2023)

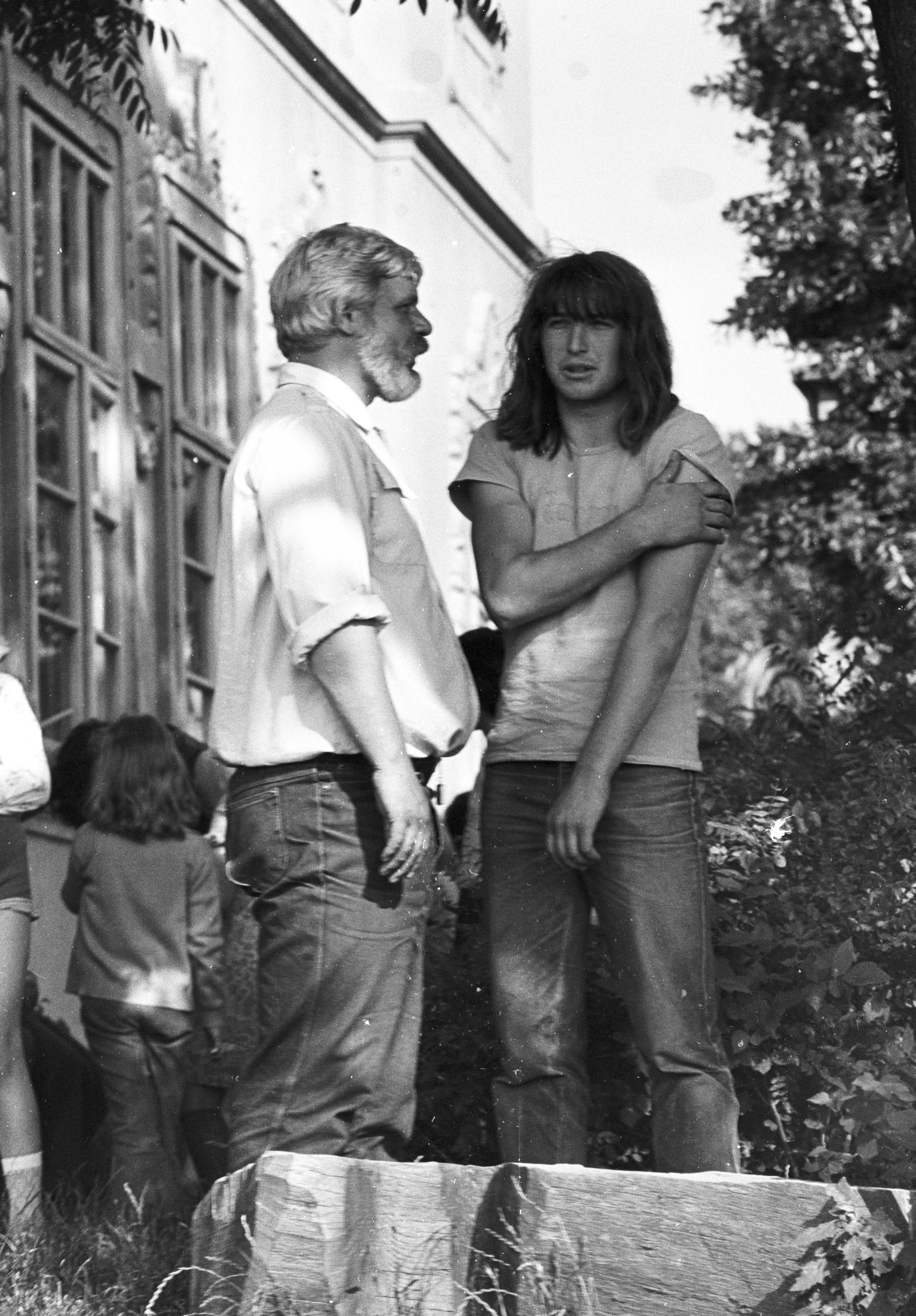
- Alföldi (left) in 1980

Member of the National Assembly of Hungary
- In office 2 November 2004 – 13 May 2010
- In office 28 June 1994 – 17 June 1998

Personal details
- Born: 7 December 1939 Szeged, Hungary
- Died: 9 November 2023 (aged 83)
- Party: MSZP
- Education: Táncsics Mihály Gimnázium
- Occupation: Folk writer

Albert Alföldi (7 December 1939 – 9 November 2023) was a Hungarian folk writer and politician. A member of the Hungarian Socialist Party, he served in the National Assembly from 1994 to 1998 and again from 2004 to 2010. His son is actor and theater director Róbert Alföldi.

Alföldi died on 9 November 2023, at the age of 83.
