= Hukkle =

2002 experimental Hungarian film

- DVD cover
- Directed by: György Pálfi
- Written by: György Pálfi
- Produced by: Csaba Bereczki; András Böhm
- Starring: Ferenc Bandi; Józsefné Rácz
- Cinematography: Gergely Pohárnok
- Edited by: Gábor Marinkás
- Music by: Balázs Barna; Samu Gryllus
- Distributed by: Arsenal
- Release date: 2002
- Running time: 78 minutes
- Country: Hungary
- Languages: Hungarian; Czech
- Budget: $100,000

Hukkle (meaning "hiccup") is a 2002 experimental Hungarian film written and directed by György Pálfi about the daily life of people in a village. The story is based on the Angel Makers of Nagyrév.

== Plot ==
The story takes place in an ordinary village in Hungary. It begins with an old man who has hiccups, and takes place in front of his house near a can of milk. He observes the daily habits of the villagers, and the viewer is shown many sequences about different events: A young man drives his horse and cart filled with milk cans. Normally he would clean the cans, but he's distracted by a girl sitting in the sun. A threshing-machine is harvesting. A cat becomes poisoned and eventually dies. A mole is killed by an old lady ploughing the ground and she gives the mole to her dog. A farmer takes his pig to a sow for fertilization and the two owners watch with satisfaction when the pigs copulate. The men of the village bowl to kill time. The old man is still having hiccups.

The village seems idyllic, but there are mysterious things happening. During these events, there are sequences about women trading bottles with unknown liquids. From time to time a man dies and the collective village walks up with a chest and comforts the widow. The postwoman also shows up from time to time and gives the widow her dead mother's pension. It all seems harmless and normal life continues after the burials. When a fisherman disappears, a local policeman is determined to find out what happened to the fisherman and eventually finds out at the end when he sees the mailman appear with a package for the widow.

With little dialogue in the movie, it seems the events around the villagers, animals, and plants have no meaning. However, at the end of the movie there is a wedding where some girls sing an old folksong which reveals the murder-mystery.

== Cast ==
- Ferenc Bandi as Uncle Csuklik
- Józsefné Rácz as old woman
- József Forkas as police agent
- Ferenc Nagy as beekeeper
- Ferencné Virág as wife of the beekeeper
- Mihályné Király as grandmother
- Mihály Király as grandfather
- Eszter Ónodi as mother from the city
- Attila Kaszás as father from the city
- Szimonetta Koncz as girl from the city
- Gábor Nagy as boy from the city
- Jánosné Gyõri as mailwoman
- Edit Nagy as shepherdess
- János F. Kovács as water boy

== Awards ==
=== Acquired ===
- Cottbus Film Festival of Young East European Cinema, Audience Award: (György Pálfi)
- Cottbus Film Festival of Young East European Cinema, FIPRESCI Prize - Special Mention: (György Pálfi)
- Cottbus Film Festival of Young East European Cinema, First Work Award of the Student Jury: (György Pálfi)
- Cottbus Film Festival of Young East European Cinema, Special prize: Feature Film Competition (György Pálfi), Gergely Pohárnok
- European Film Awards, European Discovery of the Year: (György Pálfi)
- Hong Kong International Film Festival, Golden Firebird Award: (György Pálfi)
- Hungarian Film Critics Awards, Film Critics Award:Best Cinematography (Gergely Pohárnok)
- Hungarian Film Critics Awards, Film Critics Award: Best Sound (Tamás Zányi)
- Hungarian Film Critics Awards, László B. Nagy Award: (György Pálfi)
- Hungarian Film Week, "Gene Moskowitz" Critics Award: (György Pálfi)
- Hungarian Film Week, Best Debut Film: (György Pálfi)
- Molodist International Film Festival, Festival Diploma: Best Full-Length Fiction Film (György Pálfi)
- Paris Film Festival, Special Mention: (György Pálfi)
- San Sebastián International Film Festival, Best New Director - Special Mention: (György Pálfi), Csaba Bereczki, András Böhm
- Santa Fe Film Festival, Luminaria: Best Feature (György Pálfi)
- Sochi International Film Festival, Golden Rose (György Pálfi)
