= National Theatre of Szeged =

Theater in Szeged, Hungary

Szegedi Nemzeti Színház
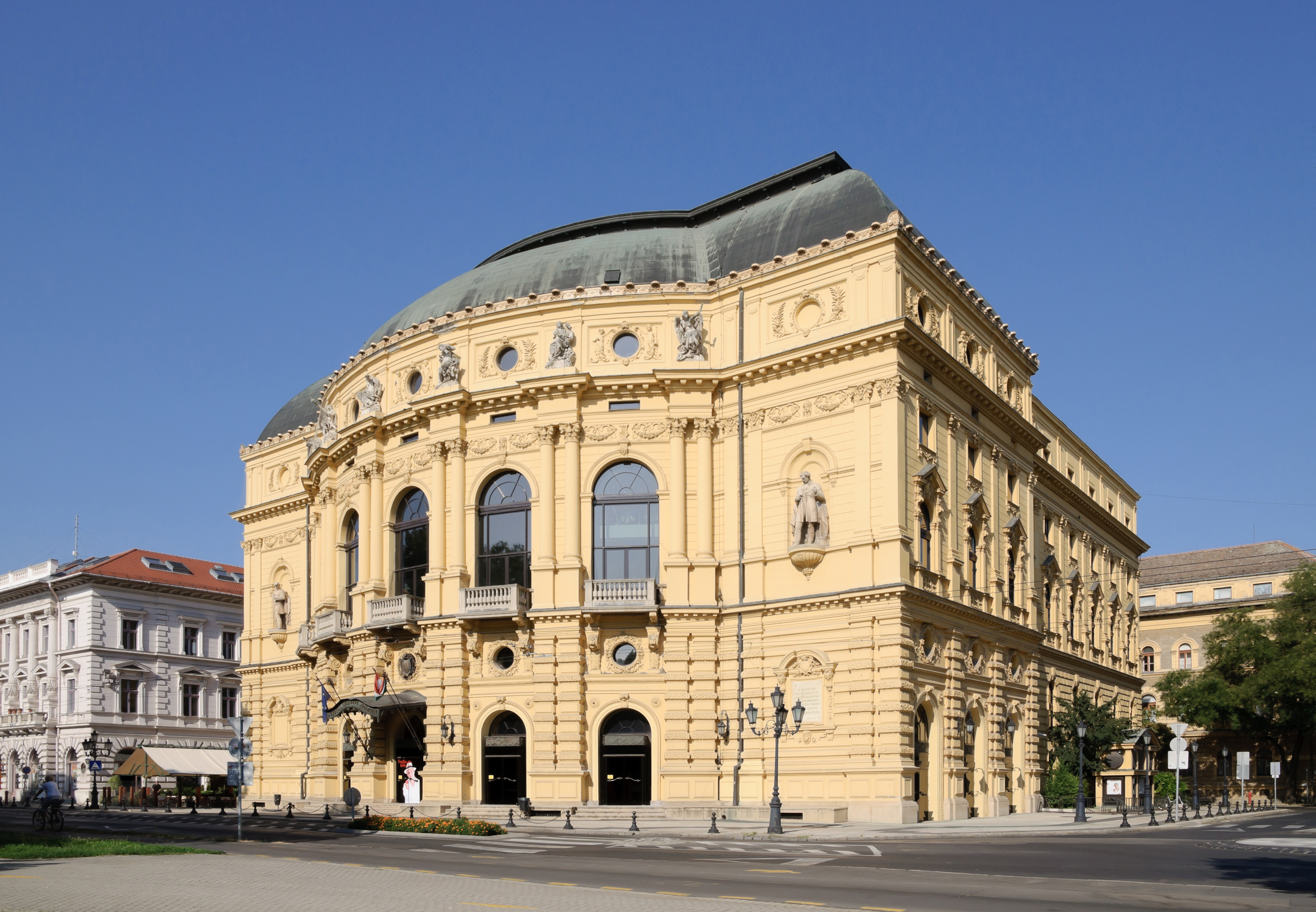
- Interactive map of Szegedi Nemzeti Színház
- Address: 1 Vaszy Viktor Square, Szeged H-6720, Hungary
- Location: Szeged, Csongrád county, Hungary
- Coordinates: 46°15′12.86″N 20°9′6.02″E
- Owner: City of Szeged
- Seating type: horseshoe-shaped with three rows of boxes
- Capacity: 680
- Type: Theatre
- Events: opera, drama, ballet

Construction
- Built: 1881-1883
- Opened: 1883
- Renovated: 1978-1986

Website
- Szegedi Nemzeti Színház

The National Theatre of Szeged is the main theatre of Szeged, Hungary. It was built in 1883 by the well-known company of Ferdinand Fellner and Hermann Helmer in Eclectic and Neo-baroque style.

== Theatre in Szeged ==
The last decades of the 19th century saw a surge of population in Szeged, thus the plays given by travelling companies (both Hungarian and German) rose rapidly. Plays were conducted in the upper city temple, and appropriate larger halls, like on the upper levels of the city council, until a dedicated smaller hall was opened for these purposes. As this building represented significant fire hazard from 1823 onwards, it was demolished in 1847. While theatrical plays continued in club houses, and a small theatre in the later Színház street, from 1840, leaders of the city continuously tried to allocate funds for a permanent stone structure.

== The building ==
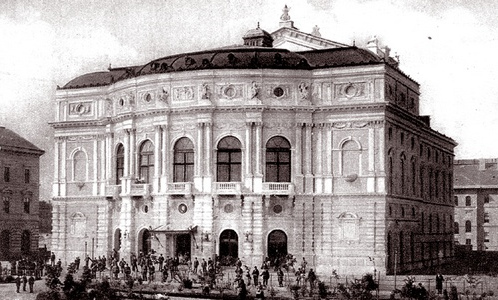
The old building before the fire

In 1878 the Szeged Theatrical Association was founded to raise funds for a future theatre. The huge reconstruction after the disastrous flood of 1879, which literally wiped the city, helped this effort. After the city council agreed upon the plans, construction began on the site bordered by the Vörösmarty, Deák Ferenc and Wesselényi streets in 1882. Used scenery for the theatre was bought from the burned Ring Theatre of Vienna. The opening was on 14 October 1883, in the presence of Emperor Franz Joseph I.

18 months after the opening, on 22 April 1885 the theatre was burned down. However, reconstruction was swift. The Fellner & Helmer company modified the previous plans to decrease the fire-hazard, and also made smaller alterations to the outer shape of the building. Historical theatre's ceiling decorations were painted in 1885 by the Vienna court painter Hermann Kern. The rebuilt theatre was opened on 2 October 1886.

After 100 years of its opening, the theatre was renovated during 1978–1986.

== The Kisszínház ==
Modifying the former Craftsmen's Association House originally built in 1929, the Kisszínház, with a capacity of 281 seats was opened in 1977 as the chamber theatre of the National Theatre of Szeged. The building was renovated and further extended in 2005.

== Sources ==
- János, Sándor. A szegedi színjátszás krónikája - A kőszínház és társulatainak története, 1883–1944. Szeged : Bába Kiadó, 2003. ISBN 963-9347-80-9
- Igor Kovačevič, chief ed. Beyond everydayness - Theatre architecture in Central Europe, p. 176-181. Publ. by the National Theatre, Prague, 2010. ISBN 978-80-7258-364-5
- History of Theatre in Szeged and National Theatre of Szeged in the Hungarian Theatrical Lexicon (György, Székely. Magyar Színházművészeti Lexikon. Budapest: Akadémiai Kiadó, 1994. ISBN 978-963-05-6635-3), freely available on mek.oszk.hu
