= Attila Kaszás =

Slovak-born Hungarian actor and singer

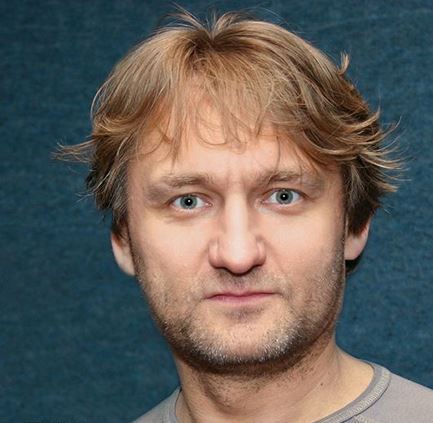
- Born: Kaszás Attila; 16 March 1960; Šaľa, Czechoslovakia
- Died: 23 March 2007 (aged 47); Budapest, Hungary
- Occupation: Actor
- Years active: 1984–2007
- Spouse(s): Enikő Eszenyi (1993–2001); Ildikó (?–2007)
- Partner: Edit Balázsovits
- Children: one son and one daughter from second marriage (born 2005 and 2007).

Attila Kaszás (Hungarian: [ˈɒtillɒ ˈkɒsaːʃ]; 16 March 1960 – 23 March 2007) was a Slovak-born Hungarian actor.

== Early life ==
Attila Kaszás born in Šaľa, Czechoslovakia, but he spent his childhood in Vlčany, where his parents taught in the local school. He went then to the in János Selye High School in Komárno. From 1979 he studied at the Academy of Drama and Film in Budapest, where he finished in 1983. From 1984 he was the member of the Vígszínház for 15 years, then he worked as a freelancer for 4 years. From 2003 he was the member of the National Theatre. He played roles in the József Katona Theatre in Kecskemét, New Theatre in Budapest, Kamaraszínház in Budapest, Rock Theatre in Budapest and in Győr, Kecskemét, Sopron and Szeged.

He reached his first success in 1990 in Georg Büchner's comedy, Leonce and Lena, acting Leonce. He got the Best Actor-prize then. In his career he played main character in more than 50 acts, TV and movie roles. With his finest sound he played in several musicals, too.

His first wife was actress Enikő Eszenyi, then after a short relationship with actress Edit Balázsovits he married again. From his second marriage one son was born, Jancsi (*2005) and shortly after his death his wife gave birth to their daughter, Luca (*2007).

== Death ==
According to his actor friend, Péter Trokán, he already felt very badly days before the first performance of Twelve Angry Men. On 19 March 2007 on the pilot of this act, he suddenly dropped on the stage. In the ambulance he needed to be reanimated. He was carried into the Neurological Institute for intensive care, with a diagnosis of a stroke. He stayed there for four days in a coma. On the night of 22 March an operation was held to save his life, but on the second day at 7:40 p.m. he died.

== Filmography ==
- Fehér rozsda (1982) - TV
- Macbeth (1982)
- Cha-Cha-Cha (1982)
- Az élet muzsikája (1984)
- Boszorkányszombat (1984)
- Napló Gyermekeimnek (1984)
- Hány az óra, Vekker úr? (1985)
- A Másik ember (1987)
- Nyolc évszak (1987) - TV mini series
- Zuhanás közben (1987)
- Titánia, Titánia, avagy a dublörök éjszakája (1988)
- Hét akasztott (1988)
- Tükörgömb (1990)
- Zenés TV színház (1990)
- Isten hátrafelé megy (1991)
- Édes Emma, drága Böbe (1992)
- Prinzenbad (German movie) (1993)
- Patika (1994–1995) TV-series
- Érzékek iskolája (1996)
- Üvegtigris (2001)
- A Hídember (2002)
- Hukkle (2002)
- Egy hét Pesten és Budán (2003)
- Üvegfal (2003)
- Sértett (2003)
- Kútfejek (2006)
- Indián nyár (2006) - TV
- Árpád népe (2006) - TV
- 56 csepp vér (2007)
- A Kísértés (2007) - TV

== Theatre credits ==
List of Attila Kaszás theatre credits
Year	Title	Role	Notes
1987	Les Misérables	Enjolras	Original Hungarian production
