= Róbert Alföldi =

Hungarian actor and director (born 1967)

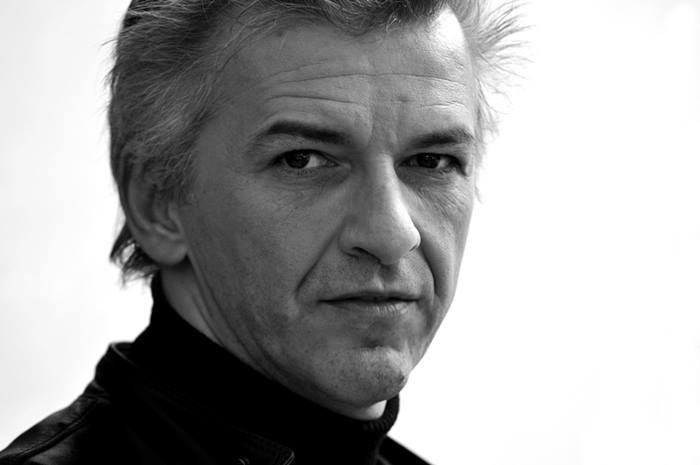
- By Gáspár Stekovics
- Born: 22 November 1967 (age 58); Kalocsa, Hungary
- Occupations: Actor, voice actor, director, television host
- Years active: 1991–present

Róbert Alföldi (born 22 November 1967) is a Hungarian actor, director and television host. He was the director of the Hungarian National Theater for five years from 1 July 2008 until 2013.

He is best known for his numerous controversial theatrical adaptations as a director and for his television appearance in X-Faktor. His art was rewarded with several national prizes and professional recognitions. In 2014 the Hungarian edition of Forbes named him at number 1 in its List of The 100 Most Valuable Hungarian Celebrities.

== Family background ==
Alföldi was born in Kalocsa and spent his childhood in Dunapataj and Ordas. His mother is Magdolna Farkas-Cseke a financial leader, his father was Albert Alföldi, a politician of the MSZP party and parliamentarian between 1994 and 1998. He met his father at the age of 28, he and his brother Szabolcs having been raised entirely by his mother and grandmother. He has two half sisters and one half brother: Angéla, Alíz and Albert.

== Education ==
In the primary school he studied at a musical school piano and violin as well, but at his early years he decided to become an actor. He continued his studies in Szentes at the Horváth Mihály High School's drama department. After finishing the high school he passed his entrance exam right away, and he continued his studies at the Faculty of Theatre, Film and Television in Budapest. He had as class leaders Istvan Horvai and Dezso Kapas, that are highly recognized acting teachers of this domain.

== Career ==
He had his first performance as an actor in his fourth university year in 1991. He performed the role of Raskolnikov from Dostoyevsky's Crime and Punishment. In 1992 he became an actor of the biggest theatre company at Vígszínház where he starred as Romeo (Shakespeare: Romeo and Juliet), Ivan Karamazov (Dostoyevsky: The Brothers Karamazov), Arthur (Sławomir Mrożek: Tango), Oscar Wilde (Moisés Kaufman: Gross Indecency: The Three Trials of Oscar Wilde). His first work as a director was a great success, making his own interpretation of Tristan and Isolde. Since then he is directing in the best theatres all around Hungary. In 2000 he became a freelancer, so he quit the Vígszínház as a permanent member of the cast. Until 2006 he was a freelancer and in this period due to his appearance on television he became well known at the national level. Between 1998 and 2002 he worked at RTL Klub and hosted morning talk show Jó reggelt, which gained national fame for him as a television personality. Later, he starred in late-night talk show Heti Hetes, talent show Társulat and was a mentor in the fourth and fifth season of X-Faktor.
Between 1 March 2006 and 28 February 2008 he was the director of the Bárka Theatre and from 2008 to 2013 the director of the Hungarian National Theater.

== Personal life ==
Alföldi is openly gay and a supporter of the Budapest Pride.

== Main theater roles ==
He has had a total of 51 theatre roles and has directed 56 different performances.

- Kengyelfutó (Born Miklós: Betlehemes)
- Valer (Molière: Tartuffe)
- Soldier (Barta: Love)
- Figaro (Beaumarchais: The Marriage of Figaro, 1989)
- Richard III (William Shakespeare: Richard III, 1989)
- Macbeth (Shakespeare: Macbeth, 1990)
- Rodion Raskolnikov (Dostoyevsky: Crime and Punishment)
- Puck (Shakespeare: A Midsummer Night's Dream)
- Callimaco (Machiavelli: The Mandrake)
- Ivan (Dostoyevsky: The Brothers Karamazov)
- Romeo (William Shakespeare: Romeo and Juliet)
- Cornwall (William Shakespeare: King Lear)
- Richard III (William Shakespeare: Richard III, 2018)

== Main directed performances ==
- Shakespeare: The Merchant of Venice (1998)
- Friedrich Schiller: The Robbers (1998)
- Shakespeare: The Tempest (1999)
- Beaumarchais: The Marriage of Figaro (2000)
- Shakespeare: Hamlet (2001)
- Shakespeare: Macbeth (2001)
- Shakespeare: A Midsummer Night's Dream (2001)
- Friedrich Schiller: The Maid of Orleans (2002)

== Awards ==
- Latinovits Zoltán prize
- Roboz Imre prize
- Jászai Mari Award
- Hegedüs Gyula Memory Ring
- Pro Future Prize
- Radio Actor Prize
- Ajtay Andor Memory Prize
- Ruttkai Éva Memory Ring
- Piatra Neamt First Prize
- Súgó Csiga Prize
- Déri János Prize
- Pro Cultura Urbis Prize
- Culture Prize-by the Romanian Society of Culture from Budapest
- POSZT prize
- Hevesi Sándor Prize
