= László Marton (director) =

Hungarian theatre director (1943–2019)

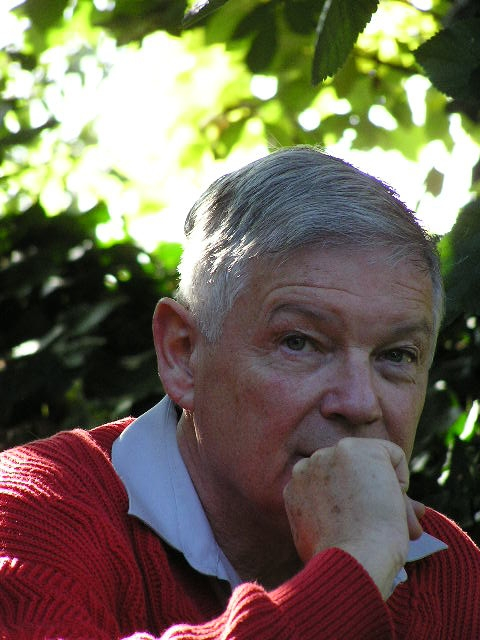
- Marton in 2003
- Born: 6 January 1943; Budapest, Hungary
- Died: 12 September 2019 (aged 76); Budapest, Hungary
- Occupations: theatre director, artistic director
- Years active: 1967–2019
- Website: http://www.laszlomarton.net

László Marton (6 January 1943 – 12 September 2019) was a Hungarian contemporary theatre director. Marton was the artistic director of the Vígszínház and professor of the University of Theatre, Film and Television in Budapest. Marton was known for directing classics through a new lens, and his productions have been seen in more than 40 cities throughout the world.

He was an Honorary Member of the London Guildhall School of Music and Drama. Marton earned three Dora Mavor Moore Awards for his Chekhov productions in Toronto, for Masterclass Theatre and for Soulpepper Theatre Company, and the Irish Times Theatre Award as Best Director for The Wild Duck, a production he directed for the Abbey Theatre (National Theatre of Ireland) in Dublin.

In October 2017, several victims accused Marton of sexual harassment and assault. He initially denied the allegations, but later issued an apology. His employment at Vígszínház was subsequently terminated.

== Early life and education ==
Marton was born in Budapest, Hungary, to Ilona Keresztes, a graduate of École hôtelière de Lausanne, and László Marton, Sr., a representative for a Hungarian foreign trade company. He is also related to Golden Globe Award winner Hollywood movie director Andrew Marton. Marton's interest in theatre took root early in his life, and he was first introduced to the world of opera by his godfather, Hungarian conductor, János Ferencsik. Marton attended the Secondary School of the Piarist Fathers and graduated from the University of Theatre, Film and Television in Budapest in 1967. In the same year, at the age of twenty-four, he staged his first professional play at the Vígszínház, in Budapest, where he became artistic director in 1987.

== Career ==
Marton's international career started in 1974 in Germany at the Deutsches Nationaltheater and Staatskapelle Weimar. Since then he directed for the Finnish National Theatre, Actors Theatre of Louisville, the Habima Theatre (Israel's National Theatre), the Barbican Centre in London, Santa Fe Stages in New Mexico, the Court Theatre in Chicago, the Abbey Theatre in Dublin, Soulpepper Theatre Company in Toronto and others.

Some of his most important theatrical works included a new adaptation of Chekhov's Platonov, (by Marton and Susan Coyne) for Soulpepper Theatre Company in Toronto, and productions of Chekhov's Uncle Vanya for Soulpepper Theatre Company in Toronto and Playmakers Repertory Company in Chapel Hill, North Carolina, with set and costume designer Michael Levine. In celebration of their 10th anniversary in 2008, (Celebrating 10 Years of history's greatest plays 1998–2008) Soulpepper Theatre Company revived Marton's Production of Uncle Vanya.

In 2003, Marton directed a new adaptation of Ibsen's The Wild Duck by Frank McGuinness for The Peacock Theatre in Dublin and later for Soulpepper Theatre Company in Toronto. His production of Dance in Time for the Vígszínház was invited to the Abbey Theatre's centenary programme in 2004. A year later, he directed a production of A Doll's House by Henrik Ibsen for the Abbey Theatre in Dublin, in a new version by McGuinness.

As of September 2009, Marton was directing Mozart's The Magic Flute for the Vígszínház, in collaboration with the Hungarian State Opera House.

Marton's productions of great emotional resonance were highly acclaimed by critics for revealing a deep psychological intimacy and bringing new life to classics. An actress said that working with him is "incredibly demanding but he's incredibly kind as well. It just creates an atmosphere where it feels safe to risk things".

== Sexual assault allegations ==
On 14 October 2017, Hungarian actress Lilla Sárosdi alleged in a Facebook post that a well-known Hungarian theatre director had sexually assaulted her 20 years earlier. A few days later, she named Marton as the perpetrator. At first Marton denied the allegations, but suspended his teaching activity and resigned from his position at Vígszínház. On 20 October, two more people anonymously accused Marton of sexual assault. Two days later, 444.hu published an article with similar stories from several new victims. Marton declined to comment on the new allegations. One week after the original allegations, Marton issued a statement "'apologizing for hurting anybody or putting them in a difficult situation", adding that "he never intended to hurt or humiliate anyone". Lilla Sárosdi said she accepted the apology. On the same day, two new victims accused Marton of sexual assault. Subsequently, Vígszínház initiated the termination of Marton's employment.

Toronto's Soulpepper Theatre Company revealed it severed ties with Marton back in 2015 after a member of its community filed a complaint about sexual harassment. Marton's relationship with the company was immediately and permanently terminated. Soulpepper said, "Marton's behaviour was both unacceptable in human terms and in violation of Soulpepper's past and present policies and codes of conduct."

== Productions ==
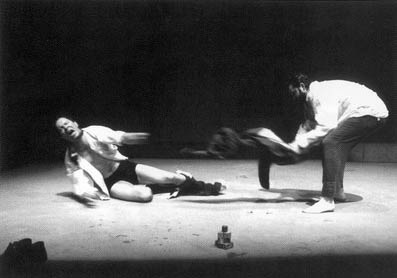
Platonov (Soulpepper Theatre Company, 1999, Toronto)

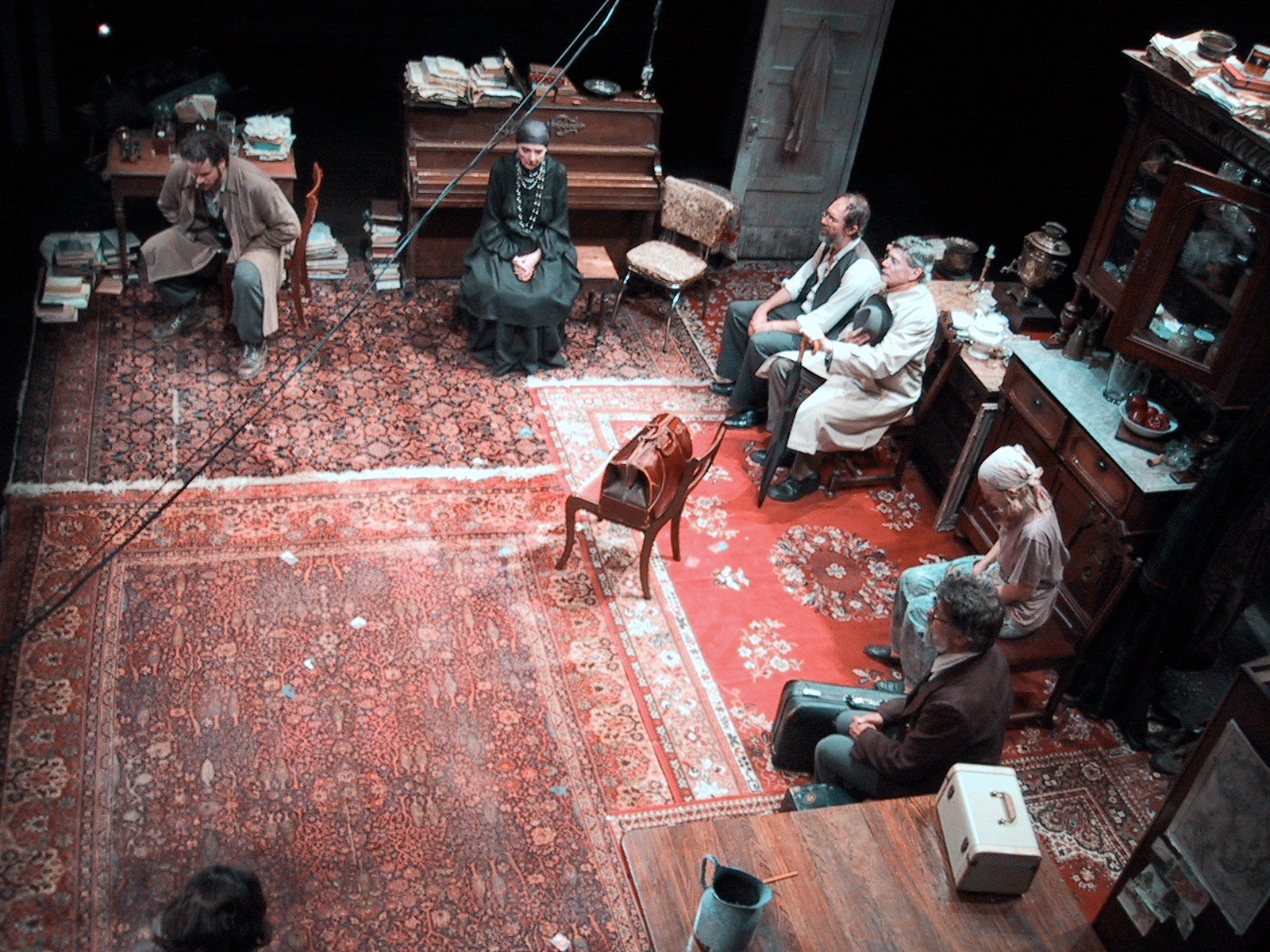
Uncle Vanya (Soulpepper Theatre Company, 2001, Toronto)

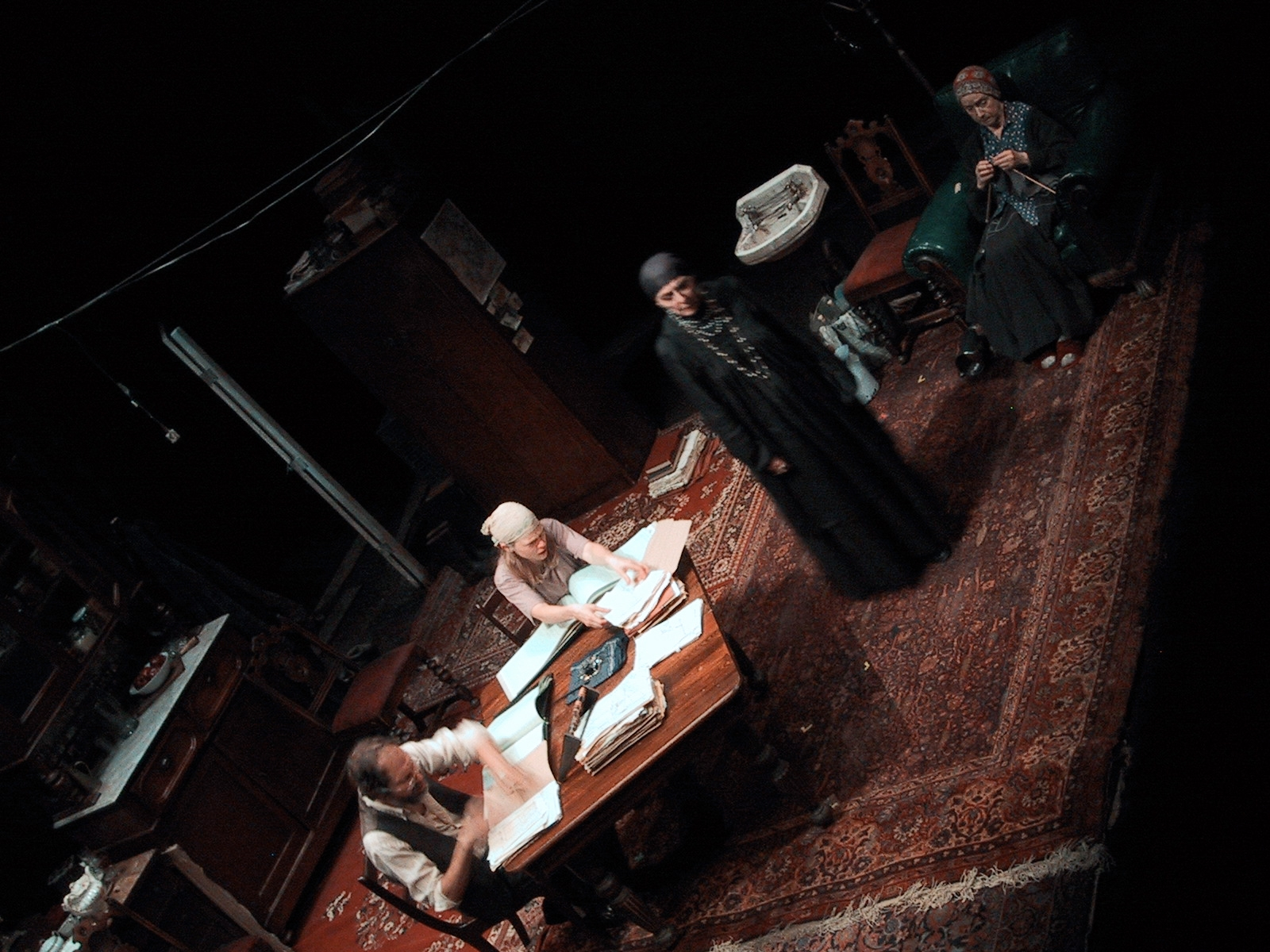
Uncle Vanya (Soulpepper Theatre Company, 2001, Toronto)

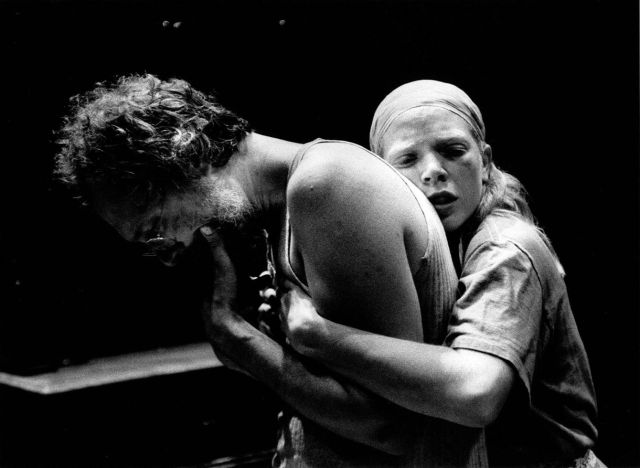
Uncle Vanya (Soulpepper Theatre Company, 2001)

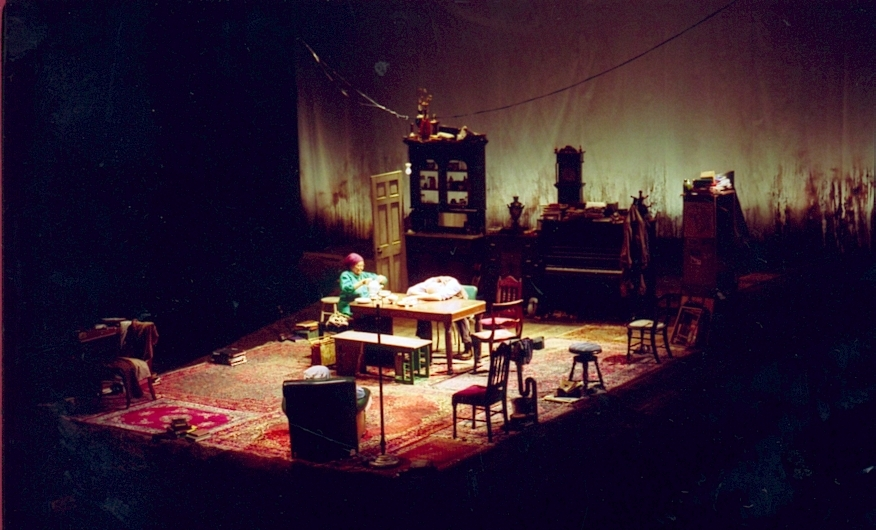
Uncle Vanya (Playmakers Repertory Company, 2003)

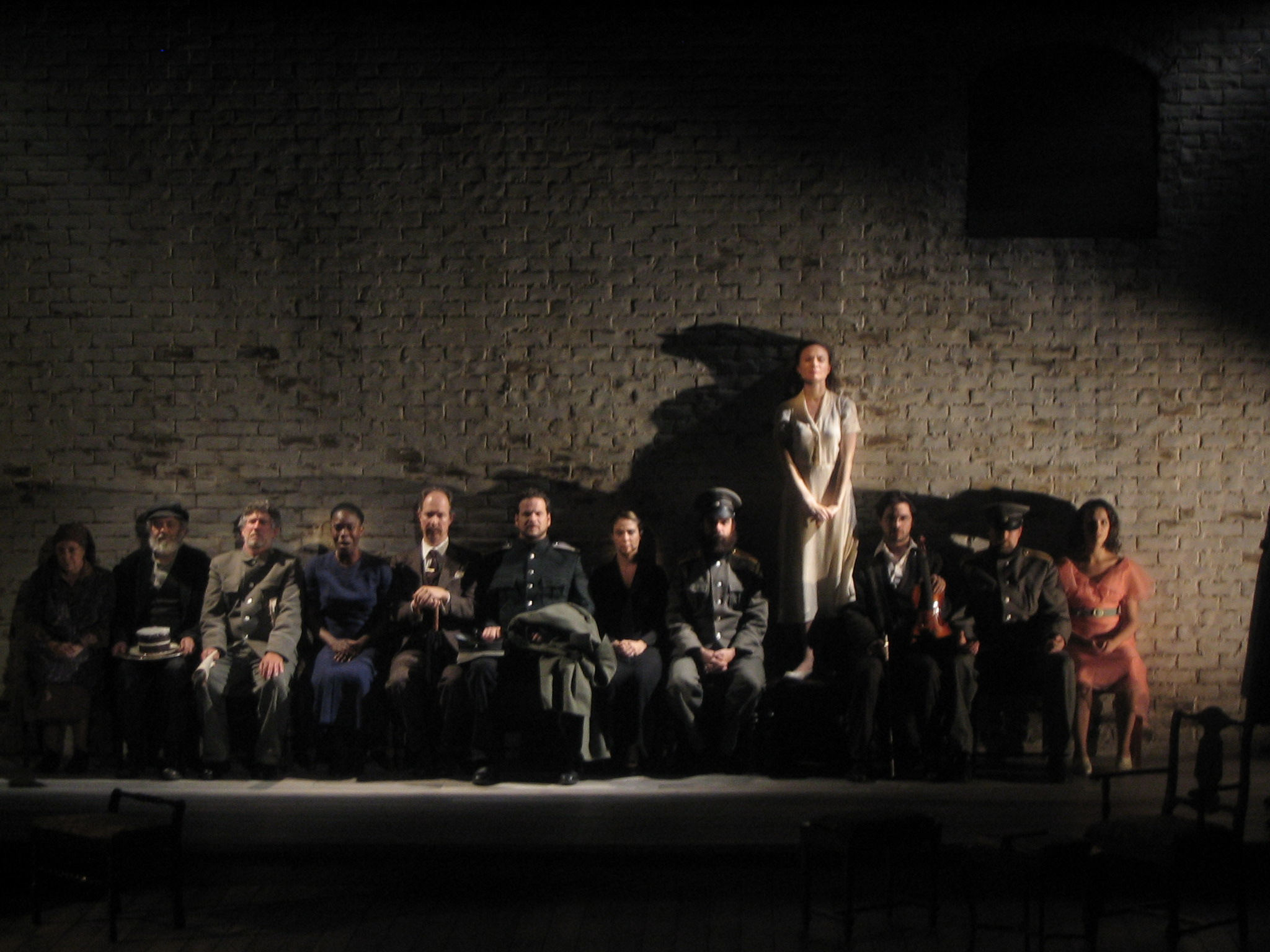
Three Sisters (Soulpepper Theatre Company, 2007, Toronto)

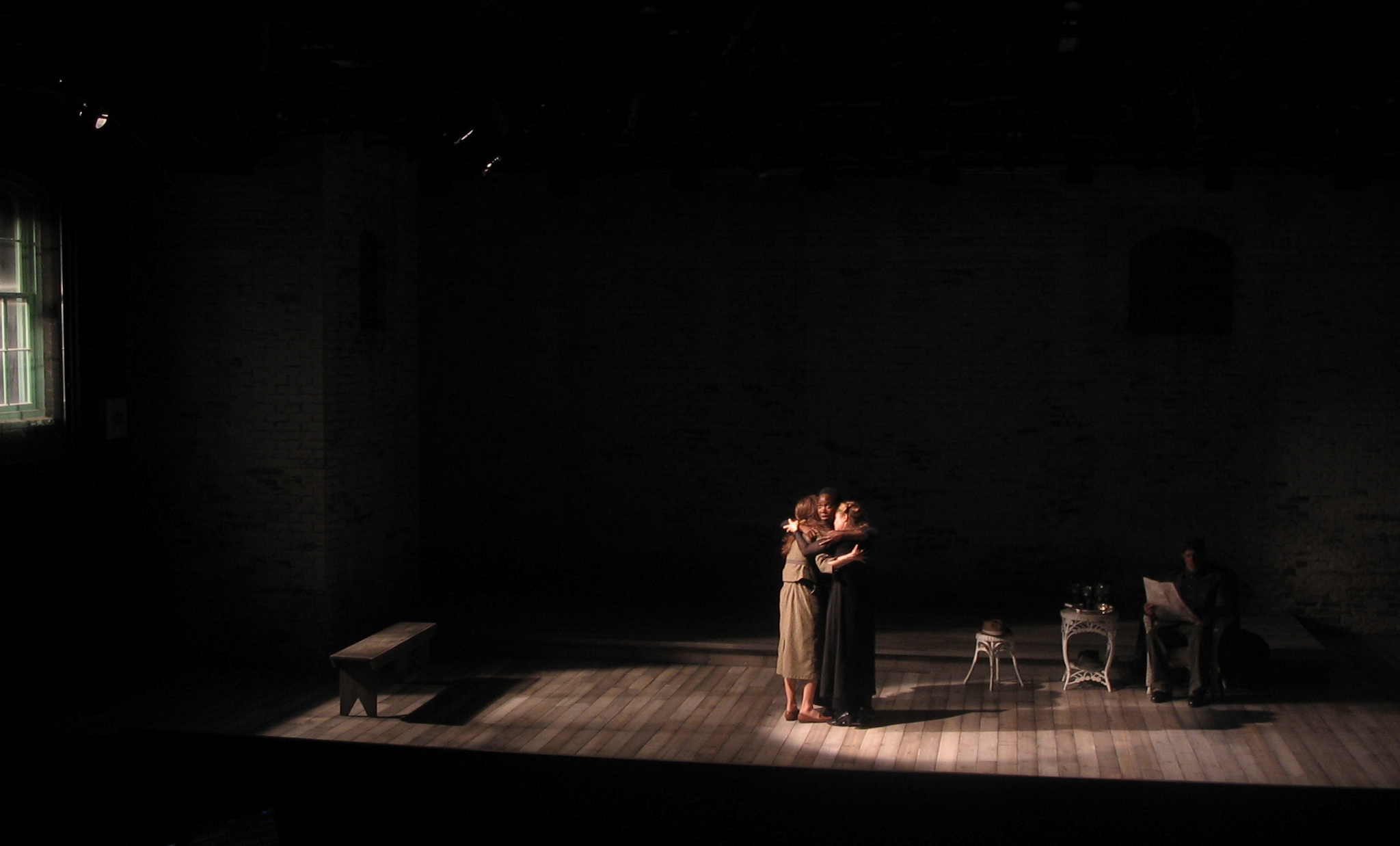
Three Sisters (Soulpepper Theatre Company, 2007, Toronto)

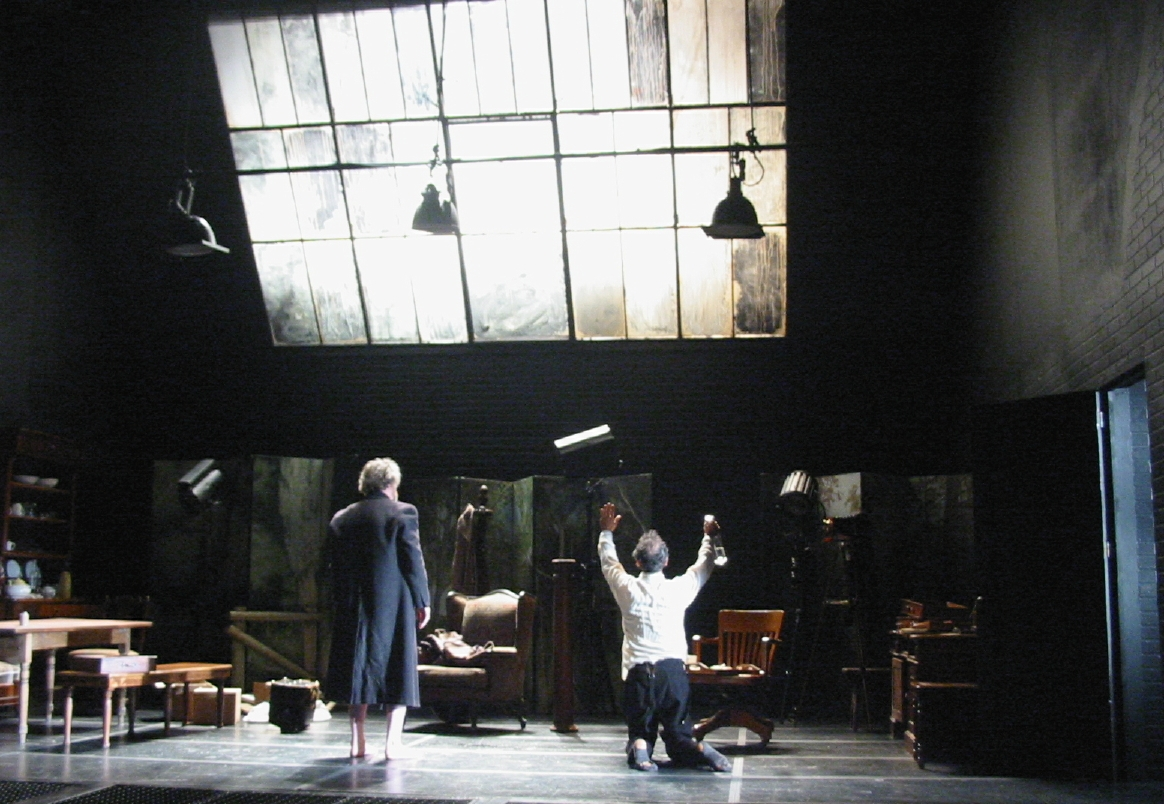
The Wild Duck (Soulpepper Theatre Company, 2005, Toronto)

- The Art of Comedy – The Silk Hat (1967) – Vígszínház, Budapest
- The Kiss (1968) – Pesti Theatre, Budapest
- Can you speak Spanish? (1968) – Vígszínház, Budapest
- Love, Closed in the Cupboard (1969) – Pesti Theatre, Budapest
- For How Long Can One Be an Angel? (1969) – Pesti Theatre, Budapest
- Theatre (1969) – Vígszínház, Budapest
- Cinderella (1969) – Bartók Children's Theatre, Budapest
- Napoleon and Napoleon (1970) – Vígszínház, Budapest
- Plaza Suite (1970) – Vígszínház, Budapest
- Summer and Smoke (1971) – Vígszínház, Budapest
- What Did You Lose, Miss? (1971) – Operetta Theatre, Budapest
- A Flea in her Ear (1971) – Vígszínház, Budapest
- Bye-bye, Darling (1972) – Pesti Theatre, Budapest
- Bella (1972) – Vígszínház, Budapest
- Squaring the Circle (1972) – Pesti Theatre, Budapest
- An Imaginary Report on an American Pop Festival (1973) – Vígszínház, Budapest
- The School for Wives (1973) – Vígszínház, Budapest
- The Dreams of Reason (1974) – Vígszínház, Budapest
- An Imaginary Report on an American Pop Festival (1974) – Nationaltheater, Weimar
- I am Thirty (1975) – Vígszínház, Budapest
- Further Sufferings of W. Junior (1975) – Pesti Theatre, Budapest
- The Mistress of the Inn (1976) – Vígszínház, Budapest
- Royal Hunt (1976) – Pesti Theatre, Budapest
- The School for Wives (1976) – National Theatre, Helsinki
- Good Evening Summer, Good Evening Love! (1977) – Vígszínház, Budapest
- Before Sunset (1977) – National Theatre, Helsinki
- Cubic Space (1978) – Pesti Theatre, Budapest
- Measure for Measure (1979) – National Theatre, Helsinki
- The Prince of Homburg (1980) – Vígszínház, Budapest
- The Royal Comedians (1980) – Vígszínház, Budapest
- The Hunt (1981) – Vígszínház Studio, Budapest
- The Guardsman (1981) – Landestheater Detmold
- The Tower (1982) – Pesti Theatre, Budapest
- King Béla the Blind (1982) – Castle Theatre, Gyula
- King Béla the Blind (1982) – Pesti Theatre, Budapest
- The Dupe (1982) – Vígszínház, Budapest
- Physicists (1982) – Landestheater, Detmold
- A Midsummer Night's Dream (1983) – Pesti Theatre, Budapest
- A Midsummer Night's Dream (1983) – Actors Theatre of Louisville
- Richard II (1984) – Vígszínház, Budapest
- The Invisible Legion (1985) – Vígszínház, Budapest
- The School for Wives (1985) – Actors Theatre of Louisville
- Liliomfi (1985) – Lyceum Court, Eger
- Ivan the Terrible (1986) – Vígszínház, Budapest
- Star of Seville (1986) – Vígszínház, Budapest
- The Royal Comedians (1986) – Actors Theatre of Louisville
- The Mistress of the Inn (1986) – Masterclass, Toronto
- Push-Up (1987) – Pesti Theatre, Budapest
- Little Shop of Horrors (1987) – Actors Theatre of Louisville
- The School for Wives (1987) – Habima, Tel Aviv
- The Attic (1988) – Vígszínház, Budapest
- The Proconsul of Caligula (1988) – Pesti Theatre, Budapest
- As We Do It (1989) – Vígszínház, Budapest
- Les liaisons dangereuses (1989) – Actors Theatre of Louisville
- The Horse (1989) – Barbican, London
- Black Peter (1990) – Vígszínház, Budapest
- Richard III (1990) – Vígszínház, Budapest
- Three Sisters (1991) – Masterclass, Toronto
- Les liaisons dangereuses (1991) – Masterclass, Toronto
- The Tower (1991) – Habima, Tel Aviv
- The Mistress of the Inn (1991) – Bersheva, Tel Aviv
- Servant to Two Masters (1992) – Vígszínház, Budapest
- Death of a Salesman (1992) – Habima, Tel Aviv
- Shooting Simone (1993) – Actors Theatre of Louisville – Humana Festival
- Incident at Vichy (1994) – Pesti Theatre, Budapest
- Dance in Time (1994) – Vígszínház, Budapest
- Macbeth (1995) – Vígszínház, Budapest
- Beast on the Moon (1995) – Actors Theatre of Louisville – Humana Festival
- Olympia (1995) – Actors Theatre of Louisville
- Masterclass (1996) – Pesti Theatre, Budapest
- The Plays the Thing (1996) – Court Theatre, Chicago
- The School for Wives (1996) – Santa Fe Stages
- Sylvia (1997) – Vígszínház, Budapest
- Lighting Up the Two Year Old (1997) – Actors Theatre of Louisville – Humana Festival
- The Guardsman (1997) – Santa Fe Stages
- 14 Szent István Boulevard (1998) – Vígszínház, Budapest
- Popcorn (1998) – Vígszínház, Budapest
- Dance in Time (1998) – Clarence Brown Theatre, Knoxville
- The School for Wives (1998) – Court Theatre, Chicago
- A Midsummer Night's Dream (1999) – Court Theatre Chicago
- The Play's the Thing (1999) – Soulpepper Theatre Company, Toronto
- Platonov (1999) – Soulpepper Theatre Company, Toronto
- The Play's the Thing(1999) – Ottawa Art Center
- A Woman (2000) – Vígszínház Studio, Budapest
- The Odd Couple (2000) – Vígszínház, Budapest
- Platonov (2000) – Soulpepper Theatre Company, Toronto
- Uncle Vanya (2001) – Soulpepper Theatre Company, Toronto
- A Doll's House (2001) – Vígszínház, Budapest
- A Flea in her Ear (2001) – Soulpepper Theatre Company, Toronto
- Black-out (2002) – Pesti Theatre, Budapest
- Legend of a Horse (2002) – Vígszínház, Budapest
- Uncle Vanya (2002) – Soulpepper Theatre Company, Toronto
- Uncle Vanya (2003) – Playmakers Repertory Company, Chapel Hill
- The Wild Duck (2003) – The Peacock Theatre, Dublin
- The Play's the Thing (2003) – Soulpepper Theatre Company, Toronto
- A Doll's House (2003) – The Rep, Milwaukee
- Pisti in the Bloodshed (2004) – Vígszínház, Budapest
- The Mistress of the Inn (2004) – Soulpepper Theatre Company, Toronto
- The Guardsman (2005) – Alliance Theatre, Atlanta
- A Doll's House (2005) – The Abbey Theatre, Dublin
- The Wild Duck (2005) – Soulpepper Theatre Company, Toronto
- A Flea in her Ear (2005) – The Rep, Milwaukee
- Three Sisters (2007) – Soulpepper Theatre Company, Toronto
- Uncle Vanya (2008) – Soulpepper Theatre Company, Toronto
- The Mistress of the Inn (2009) – The Rep, Milwaukee
- The Guardsman (2009) – Soulpepper Theatre Company, Toronto
- Uncle Vanya (2010) – Vígszínház, Budapest
- To Be or Not To Be (2011) – Vígszínház, Budapest
- The Black Out (2013) – Rózsavölgyi Szalon, Budapest
- Tartuffe (2014) – Soulpepper Theatre Company, Toronto

== Awards and titles ==
- Order of Merit of the Republic of Hungary – Commander's Cross with the Star (2009)
- Irish Times Theatre Award – Best Director (The Wild Duck by Henrik Ibsen) Ireland (2004)
- International Associate Director – Abbey Theatre Dublin (2003–2004)
- Kossuth Prize – Hungary (2003)
- The Most Inspiring Civil Leader Award (2002)
- Dora Mavor Moore Award – Best Production (Platonov by Chekhov) Canada (2001)
- Dora Mavor Moore Award – Best Director (Platonov by Chekhov) Canada (2000)
- Doctor of Liberal Arts (1999)
- Zsolt Harsányi Memorial Award (1998)
- Member of Stage Directors and Choreographers Society USA (1997)
- Order of Merit of the Hungarian Republic – Commander's Cross (1994)
- Pro Budapest Award (1994)
- Podmaniczky Award (1994)
- Imre Roboz Memorial Award (1994)
- Full-resident Professor of the Hungarian Academy of Dramatic Art (1992)
- Dora Mavor Moore Award – Best Production (Three Sisters by Chekhov) Canada (1991)
- Honorary Member of the London Guildhall School of Music and Drama (Great-Britain) (1990)
- The Award of the Hungarian Architects' Society (1985)
- Pro Children Award (1985)
- Artist of Merit of the Hungarian People's Republic (1984)
- Pro Castle Theatre Award (1982)
- Special Award of City of Veszprém – Veszprém TV Festival (1982)
- Plovdiv International TV Award (1982)
- Mari Jászai Award (1975)
