= Comedy Theatre of Budapest =

Theatre in Budapest, Hungary

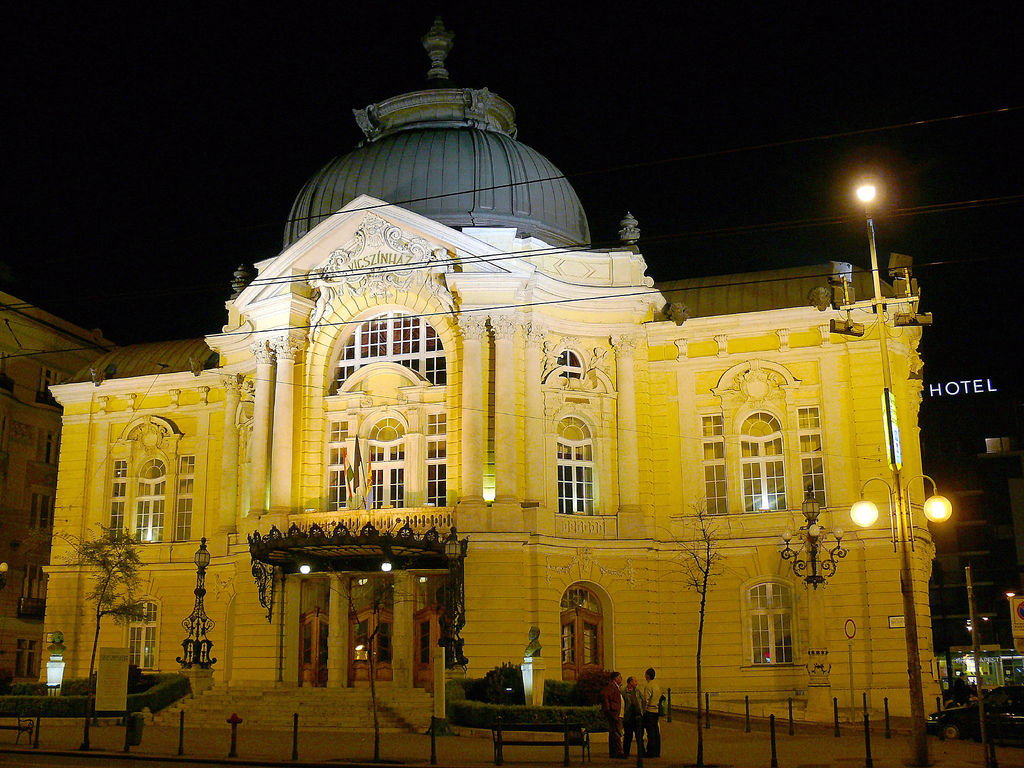
- Interactive map of Comedy Theatre of Budapest
- Address: Szent István Street 14
- Location: Budapest, Pest county, Hungary
- Coordinates: 47°30′45.21″N 19°3′5.03″E
- Capacity: 1000
- Type: Theatre

Construction
- Built: 1896
- Opened: 1896

Website
- Vígszínház

The Comedy Theatre of Budapest (Hungarian: Vígszínház) is a theatre in Budapest. Starting in the late 19th century as an opposition to the conservative National Theatre, it became a pioneer institution of Hungarian drama, and one of the oldest theatres of the city still in operation.

== The building ==
The Vígszínház was designed by architects Ferdinand Fellner and Hermann Helmer who worked on over 47 state-of-the-art theatre buildings around Europe. Its construction was financed by the tripartite ownership consisting of Count István Keglevich, the writer Ferenc Szécsi, and local businessman Gábor Faludi. The destined area was a swampland before, but in the next few years it developed into the bourgeois Lipótváros district. The construction started in 1895 and lasted for one year, finishing on 1 May 1896. With 3 main tracts: the stage, including the flies; the lower seating tract; and the entry hall; the building exemplifies late historicism, featuring large sizes, an elevated driveway and baroque decorations, often using golden coloring. As a distinct feature from contemporary theatres, the Vígszínház featured three rows of box seats, large corridors and public areas supported by several wide stairs to answer the call of rising social life in the rapidly developing Budapest.

== History ==
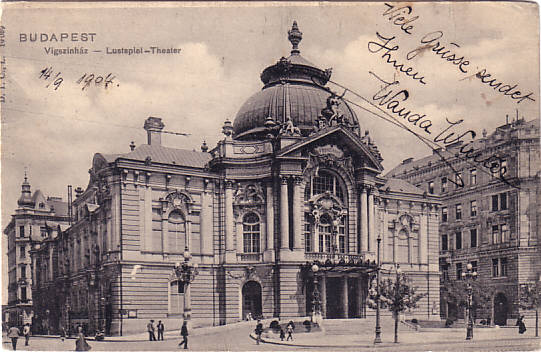
The Comedy Theatre in 1904

Mór Ditrói was the first director, coming from Kolozsvár (today Cluj-Napoca). He also brought his company of young actors, who were unknown to the Budapest audience at the time. They quickly created a unique and modern repertoire differing from the era's classical theatre, that featured both French comedies, contemporary Hungarian (starting the career of Ferenc Molnár, Sándor Bródy, or Jenő Heltai), and foreign (like from Irwine Shaw, Bertold Brecht, Anton Chekhov) dramas. The Vígszínház provided starting ground and home for several of the biggest names of the theatrical world from the turn of the century, like Gyula Csortos, Lili Darvas, Lili Muráti, Artur Somlay, Klári Tolnay or Gyula Kabos.

In the last days of World War II, on 1 January 1945, the theatre was hit by bombshells, so the company moved to the Radius Movie Theatre in the Nagymező Street. The repairs began under the supervision of Oszkár Kaufmann. Along with other similar artistic institution, Vígszínház was nationalized in 1949 (before this time, it operated as a private theatre). It reopened in 1951 under the name Theatre of the People's Army. Regaining its original name in 1960, Vígszínház became the main center of contemporary drama again, showing plays from Hungarian authors like Gábor Thurzó, Gyula Illyés, István Örkény, or classical 20th century authors like Arthur Miller or Friedrich Dürrenmatt. In 1973 they premiered the popular Képzelt riport egy amerikai popfesztiválról (An Imaginary Report on an American Rock Festival), resulting in several other musical productions under the supervision of Gábor Presser. The building underwent significant repairs in 1994.

With an average of 350.000 tickets sold each year, Vígszínház is still one of the most successful theatrical venues in Budapest.

== Pesti Színház ==
Pesti Színház, the chamber theatre of Vígszínház, is located in the 5th district. (address: Váci str. 9) Its auditorium's capacity is 538 persons.

Pesti Színház was built in 1840, based on the plans of architect József Hild. Now the building is protected by the law of National Monuments Inspectorate. Initially there was an elegant coffee house with marble columns in the tract opens to the Aranykéz Street. The upper floors originally accommodated private apartments, but these were rebuilt for suites of Hotel National. In 1902 a new reconstruction program began and the premises of Corso Cinema occupied the ground floor.

In 1936–37 the building was reconstructed again and the auditorium of the Corso Cinema was expanded. In World War II almost the whole building was destroyed. The restoration started only in 1945 and some years later the cinema was renamed to Bartók Hall.

From 1967 Pesti Színház Theatre is the chamber theatre of Vígszínház within the same company. It's a venue for plays with a more intimate atmosphere. The Pesti Színház Theatre also has several English and American successes, musicals and children-plays to its credit. The building was renovated in 2009 in a modern style.

== Sources ==
- – Comedy Theatre in the Hungarian Theatrical Lexicon (György, Székely. Magyar Színházművészeti Lexikon. Budapest: Akadémiai Kiadó, 1994. ISBN 978-963-05-6635-3), freely available on mek.oszk.hu
- pestiszinhaz.hu article – History of the theatre on the official page
