= White dove =

White dove or White Dove may refer to:

== Birds ==
- A white bird of the Columbidae family
- Doves as symbols, often portrayed as white, including:
  - Peace dove

== Songs ==
- "White Dove", a new interpretation of the 1969 Omega song "Gyöngyhajú lány" by the Scorpions
- "White Dove", a 2003 song by Starsailor from their album Silence Is Easy

== See also ==
- Little White Dove (Palomita blanca), a 1973 Chilean comedy film
- "Paloma Blanca" (Spanish for "White Dove"), a 1975 song by George Baker
- Palomita Blanca (Little White Dove), a 1971 novel by Enrique Lafourcade
- "Palomita Blanca" (song), a 1999 song by Juan Luis Guerra and 440
- The White Dove (disambiguation)
- "White, White Dove", a 1976 song by Steve Harley & Cockney Rebel
