= Gyöngyhajú lány =

1970 single by Omega

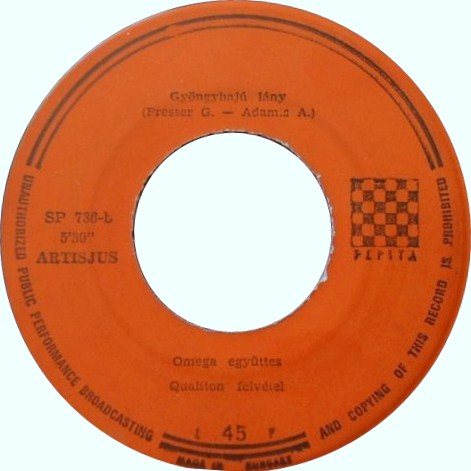

Single by Omega

from the album 10000 lépés
- A-side: "Petróleumlámpa"
- Released: 1970
- Genre: Space rock; art pop; progressive rock
- Length: 5:49
- Label: Qualiton
- Composer: Gábor Presser
- Lyricist: Anna Adamis

Music video
- "Gyöngyhajú lány" (abridged) on YouTube

"Gyöngyhajú lány" ("Pearly-Haired Girl") is a song by Hungarian rock band Omega. It was written in 1968, composed in 1969, and released on their album 10000 lépés. "Gyöngyhajú lány" was very popular in many countries, including West Germany, United Kingdom, France, Poland, Romania, Czechoslovakia, Yugoslavia and Bulgaria.

The lyrics were written by Anna Adamis, the music was composed by Gábor Presser and the song was sung by János Kóbor.

In 1970, the single "Petróleumlámpa / Gyöngyhajú lány" was released and the song gained popularity.

Omega also recorded other versions of this song in foreign languages: English ("Pearls in Her Hair") and German ("Perlen im Haar") in 1973 and 1975 respectively.

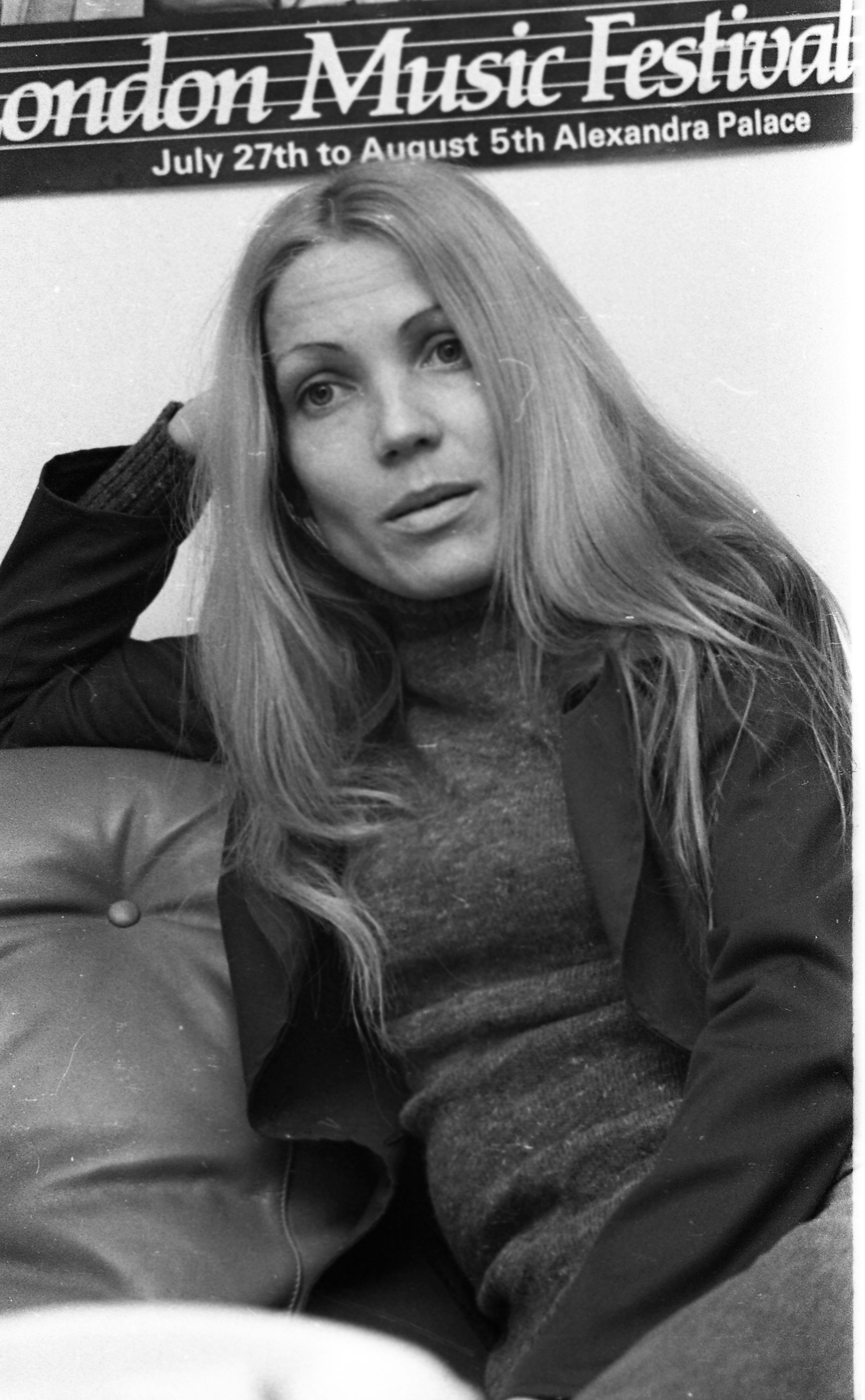
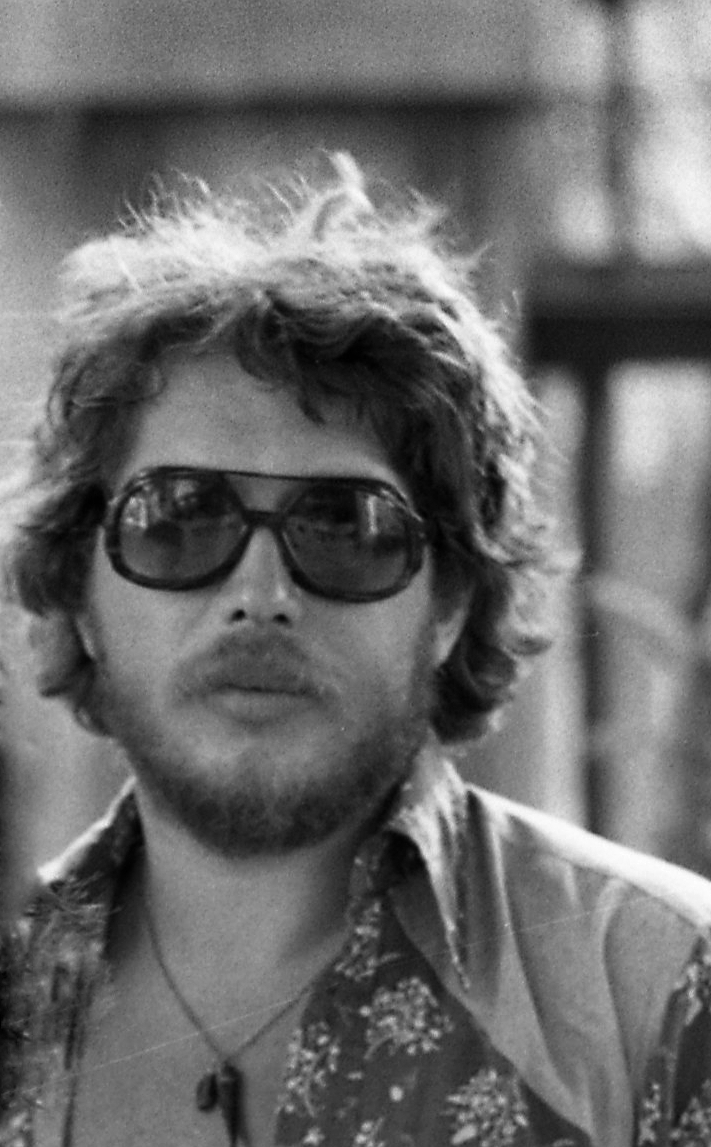
The song was written by Anna Adamis (left) and composed by Omega's then-keyboardist Gábor Presser (right)

== Other versions ==
"Pearls in Her Hair"
- French single sleeve

Single by Omega
- B-side: "The Lying Girl" (Germany); "The Bird" (France)
- Released: June 1973
- Recorded: 1973
- Genre: Space rock; art pop
- Length: 4:22
- Label: Bacillus; Bellaphon
- Composers: Gábor Presser, Laslo Novak
- Lyricist: Anna Adamis

Music video
- "Pearls in Her Hair" on YouTube

"Perlen im Haar"

Single by Omega

from the album Das Deutsche Album
- Released: 1975
- Genre: Psychedelic rock; progressive rock; hard rock
- Length: 4:21
- Label: Edition BARBArossa
- Composers: Gábor Presser, Laslo Novak
- Lyricist: Anna Adamis

Audio
- "Perlen im Haar" on YouTube

"Devojka biserne kose"

Song by Griva

from the album Griva
- Released: 1987
- Recorded: 1986
- Genre: Hard rock; glam metal
- Length: 5:00
- Label: Jugodisk
- Songwriters: Gábor Presser; Laslo Novak
- Producers: Karolj Kovač; Ivica Vlatković

Audio
- "Devojka biserne kose" (remastered 2025) on YouTube

"Gyöngyhajú lány" was covered in Poland (as "Dziewczyna o perłowych włosach"), Czech Republic (as "Paleta" by Markýz John and "Dívka s perlami ve vlasech" by Aleš Brichta and "Perly bilé" by Tibor Lenský), Yugoslavia (as "Devojka biserne kose" by Griva), Bulgaria (as "Батальонът се строява" (Batalyonat se stroyava) by Южен вятър), Lithuania (as "Meilės Nėra" by Keistuolių Teatras). It was also covered by Frank Schöbel (as "Schreib es mir in den Sand"). After the dissolution of Yugoslavia, the song was covered in Bosnia as a war song of The Army of Republic of Bosnia-Herzegovina under the name "Zemljo što ne znaš za strah"; and was also covered again as a single by Krivi Toranj as "Nirvana". The song was also remixed (e.g. by Kozmix).

=== Scorpions version ===
"White Dove"

Single by Scorpions

from the album Live Bites
- B-side: "Ave Maria No Morro"
- Released: Late 1994
- Genre: Rock
- Length: 4:19
- Label: PolyGram; Mercury (US)
- Songwriters: Gábor Presser; Anna Adamis; Rudolf Schenker; Klaus Meine
- Producers: Keith Olsen; Scorpions

Scorpions singles chronology
"No Pain No Gain" (1994)	"White Dove" (1994)	"Edge of Time" (1995)

Music video
- "White Dove" on YouTube

German rock band Scorpions covered the song titled as "White Dove", from the album Live Bites. Released as a single in late 1994, it was a top 20 hit in Germany and Switzerland, peaking at numbers 18 and 20, respectively.

==== Charts ====
Chart (1995)	Peak position
Germany (GfK)	18
Switzerland (Schweizer Hitparade)	20

== Sampling ==
In 2013, hip-hop artist Kanye West sampled the song in the outro of "New Slaves", featuring himself and Frank Ocean singing over it. West asked the band directly for permission, although the sample was cleared for use in the album by their label, Hungaroton Records. However, in May 2016, songwriter Gábor Presser filed a lawsuit seeking $2.5 million in damages for copyright infringement for the use of the sample, which was later settled out of court.

== Other uses ==
In March 2014, the song was used for the reveal trailer of the video game This War of Mine.

In August 2012, the song was used in the official trailer of the film This Ain't California.

In 2016, the song's melody was used in a German rap song FLOUZ KOMMT FLOUZ GEHT by Nimo.

In July 2018, the song was used in the official trailer and a scene of the film Mid90s.

In 2021, the Australian bank Westpac used the song in their "Life is Eventful" campaign.

In 2021, the Second Captains podcast sampled the original version of the song on an audiobed which empathised with the plight of Frank Lampard being expected work with this group of players whilst the manager of Chelsea F.C.

In 2022, the French car company Citroën used the song in a TV advertisement for their C5 Aircross hybride.
