= Omega (band) =

Hungarian rock band

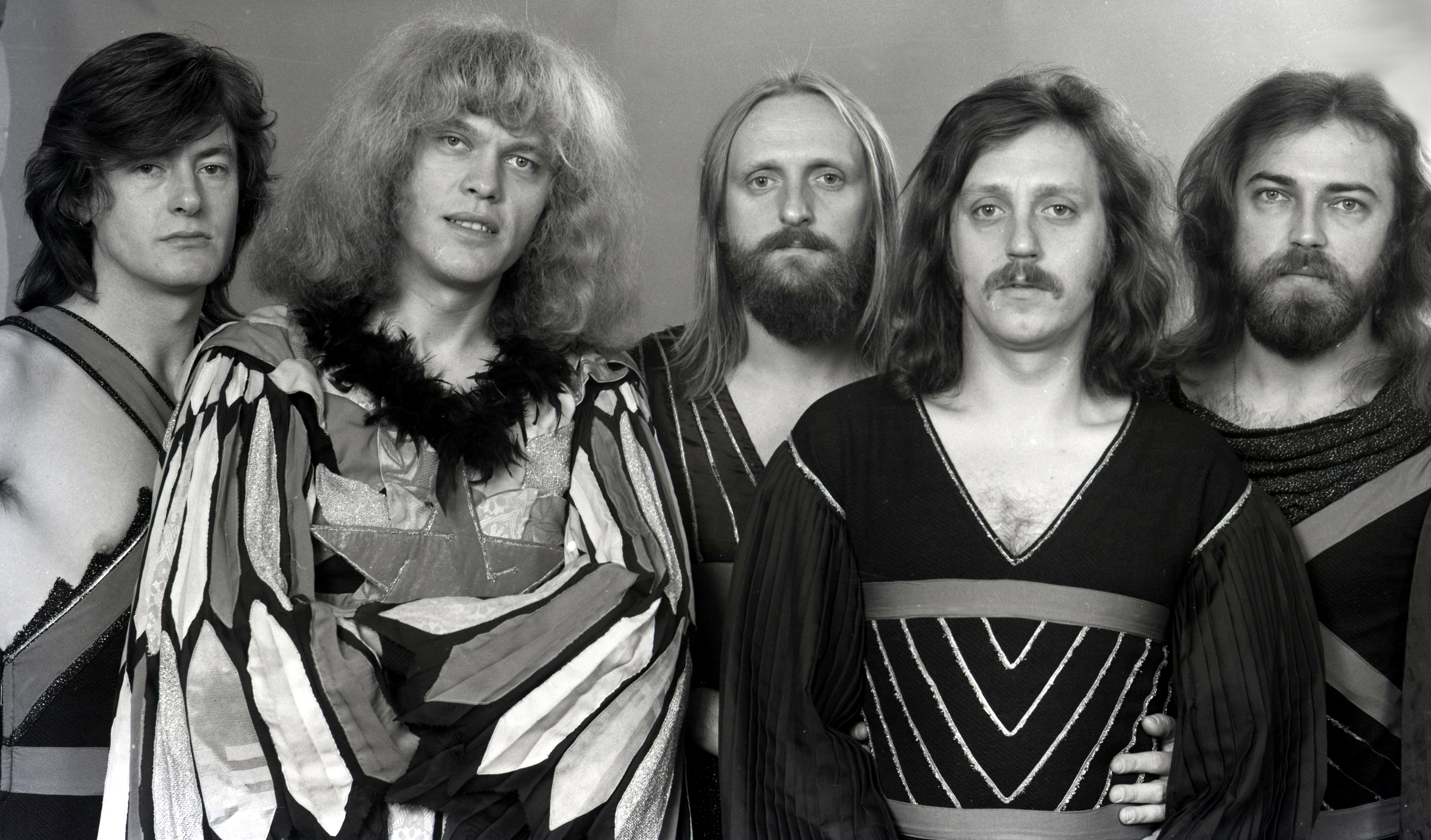
- The classic lineup of Omega in 1976 (L-R: Ferenc Debreczeni, János Kóbor, László Benkő, Tamás Mihály, György Molnár)

Background information
- Origin: Budapest, Hungary
- Genres: Hard rock; psychedelic rock; progressive rock; space rock; heavy metal
- Years active: 1962–1987; 1994–2021
- Labels: Qualiton; Pepita; Bacillus; Amiga
- Spinoffs: Locomotiv GT
- Past members: Győző Bánkúti; László Benkő; Ferenc Debreczeni; János Kóbor; Tamás Künsztler; Péter Láng; György Molnár; Ferenc Tornóczky; István Varsányi; András Kovacsics; László Harmat; József Laux; Tamás Somló; Mária Wittek; Gábor Presser; Tamás Mihály
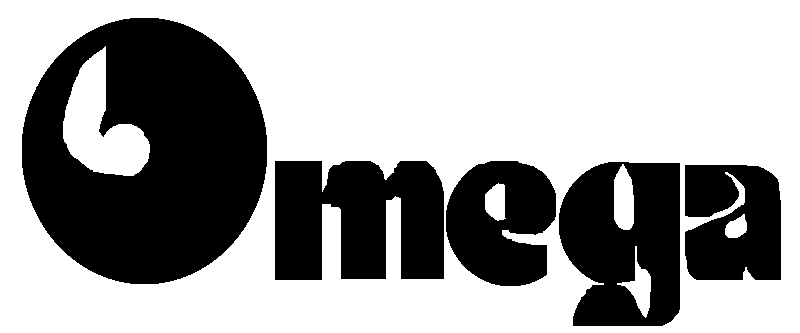

Omega was a Hungarian rock band formed in 1962, which has been described as the most successful Hungarian band in history. They released more than 20 albums both in Hungarian and English, and one in German. After several early personnel changes, their classic lineup came together in 1971 and was intact for more than forty years. Singer János Kóbor was with the band continuously from 1962 until his death in 2021; keyboardist/singer László Benkő was present from 1962 until his death in 2020. Guitarist György Molnár and bassist Tamás Mihály joined in 1967, and drummer Ferenc Debreczeni joined in 1971. The band won several prestigious awards for their contributions to Hungarian culture.

== History ==
Omega was formed in Budapest in 1962 by Benkő and Kóbor, with trombonist Győző Bánkúti, drummer Tamás Künsztler, saxophonist Péter Láng, guitarist Ferenc Tornóczky, and bassist István Varsányi. The members had all been in previous bands at the same grammar school. Their first concert was at Budapest's University of Technology and Economics in September 1962. The band went through many personnel changes in its first several years, and mostly played covers of British rock songs.

Omega first began to write their own songs with the arrival in 1967 of keyboardist/singer Gábor Presser, who was adept in rock, jazz, and folk songwriting. Guitarist György Molnár and bassist/singer Tamás Mihály also joined in 1967. The following year, the band was invited to tour England, where they recorded their debut album Omega: Red Star from Hungary with English lyrics for Decca Records. Later that year, the album was re-recorded in Hungarian and released in the band's home country as Trombitás Frédi és a Rettenetes Emberek (Trumpeter Freddy and the Terrible People). The band's sound during this period included experiments in psychedelic rock.

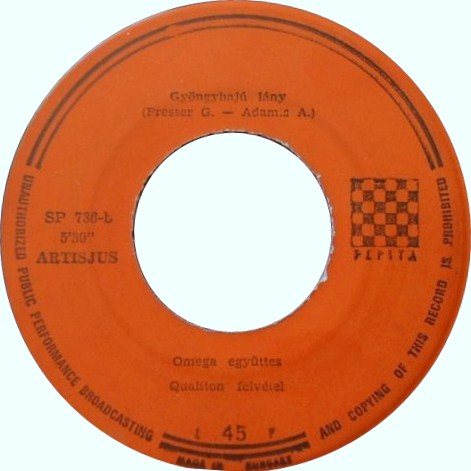
"Gyöngyhajú lány" single

Their 1969 song "Gyöngyhajú lány" ("Pearls In Her Hair") was an international hit, and was later covered by the Scorpions (as "White Dove"), as well as gaining 21st century notoriety when sampled by American rapper Kanye West on the song "New Slaves." During this period, members of Omega also gained notice for backing several Hungarian pop singers, most notably Sarolta Zalatnay.

In 1971, Gábor Presser and drummer József Laux (who had joined in 1964) left Omega and formed the progressive rock supergroup Locomotiv GT. (Tamás Somló, who had played saxophone for Omega from 1964 to 1968, became bassist for Locomotiv GT in 1973) Presser was not replaced, while the band recruited new drummer Ferenc Debreczeni. The resulting lineup of Kóbor (vocals), Benkő (keyboards/vocals), Molnár (guitar), Mihály (bass/vocals), and Debreczeni (drums) remained intact for more than 40 years until Mihály retired from touring in 2014. Presser's jazz- and folk-oriented keyboards and songwriting had been dominant in Omega's sound; after his departure the band moved toward progressive rock and space rock with Benkő's classically-oriented keyboards and Molnár's heavy guitar as the focus.

This incarnation of Omega released ten more albums starting in 1972 until taking an extended break in 1987. Most of those albums were released in both Hungarian and English versions. During the 1970s in particular, some of the band's albums were restricted or banned in Hungary due to the Communist regime's view that hard rock music was subversive. However, they were able to tour in East Germany and recorded some songs in German for their fans in that country. During this period they were also noted for science fiction-oriented lyrics. After their thirteenth album Babylon in 1987, Omega went on hiatus so the members could focus on side projects.

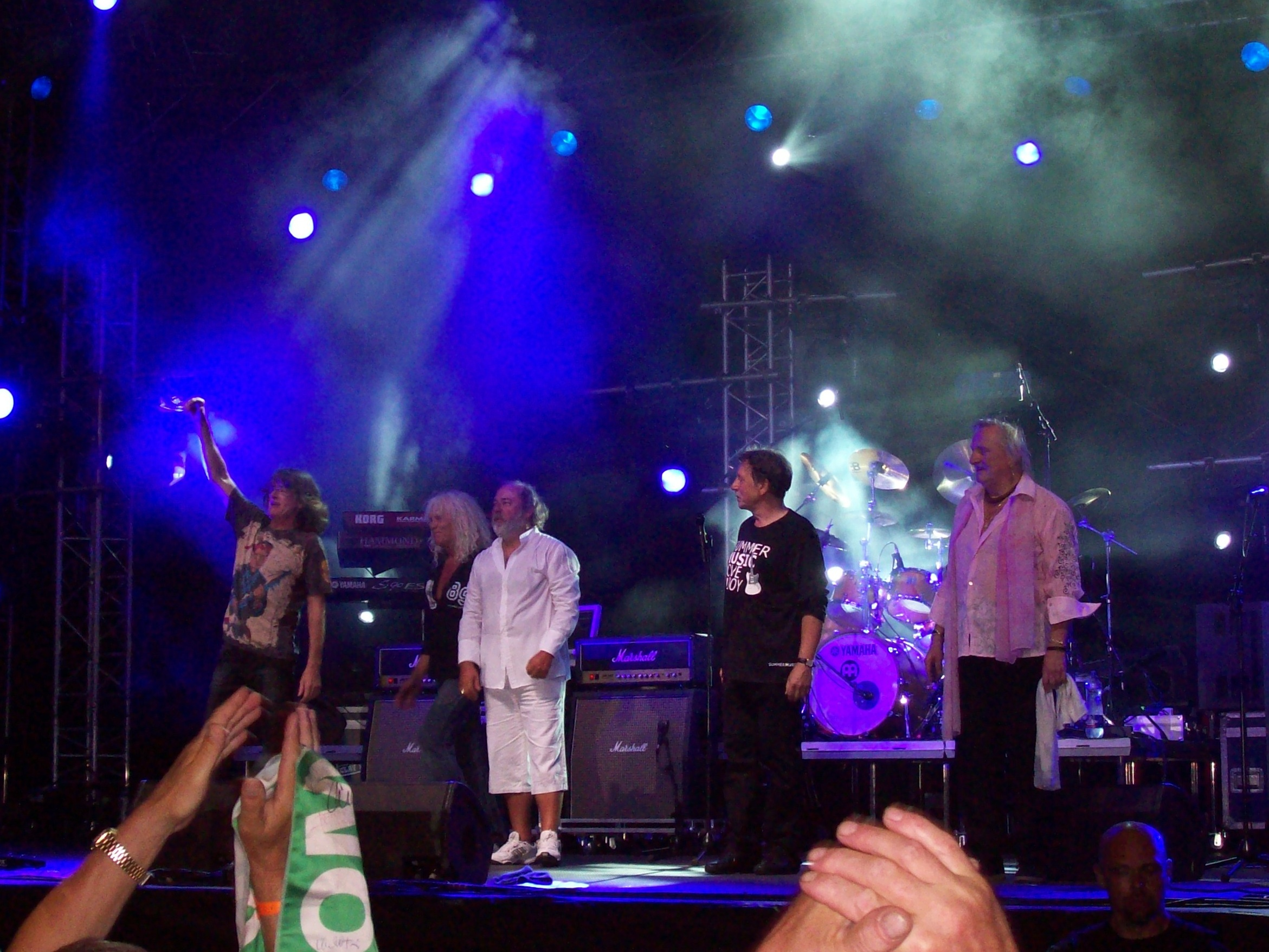
Omega performing in 2010 (L-R: Debreceni, Kóbor, Molnár, Mihály, Benkő)

Omega regrouped in 1994 for a major concert at Népstadion in Budapest, with special appearances by former members Gábor Presser and Tamás Somló, plus Rudolf Schenker and Klaus Meine of the Scorpions. Following the collapse of Communism in Hungary, most of Omega's previously suppressed albums were released on CD and generated great interest in the band as it returned to performing in 1994. Their first new album after reuniting was Trans and Dance in 1995.

In later years, the nation of Hungary bestowed many awards on the band for their important contributions to the country's music and culture, including the Liszt Ferenc Prize in 1986, the Hungarian National Award in 1998, and the Kossuth Prize in 2013. For their 50th anniversary in 2012, Omega toured with a symphony under the name "Omega Rhapsody". Longtime bassist Tamás Mihály, who had been with the band since 1967, retired from live performances in 2014, though his departure was not officially announced until 2017. The band continued to tour regularly with a rotating cast of sidemen, and the album 55 - Volt Egyszer Egy Vadkelet was released in 2017.

Founding keyboardist/singer László Benkő died at age 77 on 18 November 2020; he had been with Omega consistently since 1962. Just three days later, on 21 November 2020, longtime bassist Tamás Mihály died at age 73. The album Testamentum was released less than a week later, though its release date had been scheduled long in advance. The album was described as a "farewell" record and contained contributions from both Benkő and Mihály.

Founding singer János Kóbor died at age 78 on 6 December 2021 after contracting COVID-19. The band's manager has indicated that the remaining members will not perform under the Omega name in the future but tribute concerts in different formations may occur. As a finale to the band's 60-year history and in memory of the deceased band members, the remaining musicians joined with friends and performed as "Omega Testamentum Orchestra" at a three-day festival in Őriszentpéter from 12 to 14 August 2022.

== Personnel ==
=== Members ===
Final lineup

- János Kóbor – lead vocals (1962–1987, 1994–2021; died in 2021)
- László Benkő – keyboards, flute, trumpet, background vocals (1962–1987, 1994–2020; died in 2020)
- Tamás Mihály – bass guitar, cello, background vocals (1967–1987, 1994–2017; died in 2020)
- György Molnár – guitars (1967–1987, 1994–2021)
- Ferenc Debreczeni – drums, percussion (1971–1987, 1994–2021)

Last touring musicians

- Tamás Szekeres – guitars (1994–2007, 2011–2021)
- Katy Zee (Kata Szöllösy) – bass guitar (2011–2021)
- Albert Földi – keyboards (2011–2021)
- Levente Csordás – background vocals (2016–2021)
- Mónika Bárkányi – background vocals (2019–2021)

Former touring musicians

- Miklós Küronya – bass guitar (1998–2013, in the studio; died in 2015)
- Zsolt Gömöry – keyboards (1999–2005, 2012–2015)
- György Demeter – background vocals, acoustic guitar, trumpet, rattle (1999–2007)
- Tamás Demeter – background vocals, acoustic guitar, trumpet, rattle (1999–2007, touring substitute for Ildikó Keresztes and György Demeter)
- Béla Jankai – keyboards (2006–2013)
- Ildikó Keresztes – background vocals (1999–2007)
- Vivien Minya – background vocals, violin (2016–2019)

Former members

- Győző Bánkúti – trombone (1962)
- Tamás Künsztler – drums, percussion (1962–1964)
- Péter Láng – saxophone (1962–1963)
- Ferenc Tornóczky, Sr. – guitars (1962, died in 2020)
- István Varsányi – bass guitar (1962–1967)
- András Kovacsics – guitars (1962–1967)
- László Harmat – saxophone (1963–1964)
- József Laux – drums, percussion (1964–1971; died in 2016)
- Tamás Somló – saxophone, background vocals (1964–1968; died in 2016)
- Mária Wittek – background vocals (1964–1967)
- Gábor Presser – keyboards, lead vocals (1967–1971)

=== Lineups ===
1962	1962–1963	1963–1964	1964–1967
Győző Bánkúti – trombone; László Benkő – keyboards, flute, trumpet, background vocals; János Kóbor – lead vocals; Tamás Künsztler – drums, percussion; Péter Láng – saxophone; Ferenc Tornóczky – guitars; István Varsányi – bass guitar	László Benkő – keyboards, flute, trumpet, background vocals; János Kóbor – lead vocals; Tamás Künsztler – drums, percussion; Péter Láng – saxophone; István Varsányi – bass guitar; András Kovacsics – guitars	László Benkő – keyboards, flute, trumpet, background vocals; János Kóbor – lead vocals; Tamás Künsztler – drums, percussion; István Varsányi – bass; András Kovacsics – guitars; László Harmat – saxophone	László Benkő – keyboards, flute, trumpet, background vocals; János Kóbor – lead vocals; István Varsányi – bass guitar; András Kovacsics – guitars; József Laux – drums, percussion; Tamás Somló – saxophone, background vocals; Mária Wittek – background vocals
1967	1967	1967–1968	1968–1971
László Benkő – keyboards, flute, trumpet, background vocals; János Kóbor – lead vocals; István Varsányi – bass guitar; András Kovacsics – guitars; József Laux – drums, percussion; Tamás Somló – saxophone, background vocals; Mária Wittek – vocals; Gábor Presser – keyboards, background vocals	László Benkő – keyboards, flute, trumpet, background vocals; János Kóbor – lead vocals; András Kovacsics – guitars; József Laux – drums, percussion; Tamás Somló – saxophone, background vocals; Gábor Presser – keyboards, background vocals; Tamás Mihály – bass, cello, background vocals	László Benkő – keyboards, flute, trumpet, background vocals; János Kóbor – lead vocals; József Laux – drums, percussion; Tamás Somló – saxophone, background vocals; Gábor Presser – keyboards, lead vocals; Tamás Mihály – bass, cello, background vocals; György Molnár – guitars	László Benkő – keyboards, flute, trumpet, background vocals; János Kóbor – vocals; József Laux – drums, percussion; Gábor Presser – keyboards, background vocals; Tamás Mihály – bass, cello, background vocals; György Molnár – guitars
1971–1987	1987–1994	1994–2014/2017	2014/2017–2021
László Benkő – keyboards, flute, trumpet, background vocals; János Kóbor – lead vocals; Tamás Mihály – bass, cello, background vocals; György Molnár – guitars; Ferenc Debreczeni – drums, percussion	Disbanded	László Benkő – keyboards, flute, trumpet, background vocals; János Kóbor – lead vocals; Tamás Mihály – bass, cello, background vocals; György Molnár – guitars; Ferenc Debreczeni – drums, percussion	László Benkő – keyboards, flute, trumpet, background vocals; János Kóbor – lead vocals; György Molnár – guitars; Ferenc Debreczeni – drums, percussion

== Discography ==
=== Studio albums ===
Hungarian language albums

- Trombitás Frédi és a rettenetes emberek (1968), known as Red Star from Hungary in the international market
- 10000 lépés (1969)
- Éjszakai országút (1970)
- 200 évvel az utolsó háború után (recorded in 1972, but not released until 1998 due to government censorship; Élő Omega, a fake "live" recording of the original studio material was released instead)
- Omega 5 (1973) later remixed, remastered and released as Szvit
- Omega 6: Nem tudom a neved (1975); later remixed, remastered and released as Tűzvihar - Stormy Fire
- Omega 7: Időrabló (1977);
- Omega 8: Csillagok útján (1978); later remixed, remastered and with its English-language version released as Csillagok útján - Skyrover
- Gammapolis (1979); later remixed, remastered and with its English-language version released as Gammapolisz - Gammapolis
- Omega X: Az arc (1981)
- Omega XI (1982)
- Omega 12: A föld árnyékos oldalán (1986)
- Omega XIII: Babylon (1987)
- Trans And Dance (1995); later remixed, remastered and released as Transcendent - Hungarian version
- Omega XV: Egy életre szól (1998)
- Omega XVI: Égi jel: Omega (2006), Mahasz: Gold
- Omega Rhapsody (2010)
- Omega Szimfónia & Rapszódia (2012), Mahasz: Gold
- 55 - Volt Egyszer Egy Vadkelet (2017)
- Testamentum (2020), Mahasz: 5× Platinum

English language albums

- Omega Red Star From Hungary (1968) extremely rare vinyl recording, since October 2007 available on CD. Vocals by Mihály Tamás
- Omega (1973)
- 200 Years After The Last War (1974)
- Omega III (1974)
- The Hall Of Floaters In The Sky (1975)
- Time Robber (1976)
- Gammapolis (1978)
- Skyrover (1978)
- Working (1981)
- Transcendent (1996)
- Omega Rhapsody (2010)

Also, one German studio album was released:

- Das Deutsche Album (1975, Amiga Records)

=== Live albums ===
- Élő Omega (1972, released instead of their 4th studio album, first LP with Debreczeni on drums; on official band's site is included on the Studio Albums list)
- Élő Omega Kisstadion 79 (1979; a 2-LP set)
- Live At The Kisstadion 79 (1979; a 2-LP set, including some tracks dubbed with English vocals)
- Kisstadion '80 (1981; 5 titles by Omega, and rest of the album by 2 other performers of joint show, Locomotiv GT and Beatrice)
- Jubileumi Koncert (1983)
- Népstadion 1994 Omegakoncert No. 1: Vizesblokk (1994)
- Népstadion 1994 Omegakoncert No. 2: Szárazblokk (1994)
- Az Omega összes koncertfelvétele 1. (1995, a 3-CD set of live recordings from the 1960s and 1970s, including the Kisstadion 1979 concert)
- Az Omega összes koncertfelvétele 2. (1995, a 3-CD set of live recordings from the 1980s and 1990s)
- Népstadion 1999 (1999, released as a 2-CD set and as a DVD)
- Napot hoztam, csillagot (2004 limited edition CD; a DVD of this title was also released, with a different track list)
- Greatest Performances (2012 edition on CD and DVD), Mahasz: Gold

=== Compilation albums ===
- The Beaty Sixties (Trimedio Music, 2015)
- The Spacey Seventies (Trimedio Music, 2015)
- The Progressive Eighties (Trimedio Music, 2015)
- The Heavy Nineties (Trimedio Music, 2015)
- LP Anthology (Hungaroton, 2016, a 13-CD set of all the Hungarian language albums 1968–1987)

== See also ==
- Music of Hungary
- Hungarian rock
