= Éjszakai országút =

Studio album by Omega
- Released: 1970
- Genre: Progressive rock
- Language: Hungarian
- Label: Qualiton
- Producer: István Juhász

Omega chronology
10000 lépés (1969)	Éjszakai országút (1970)	Élő Omega (1972)

Singles from Éjszakai országút
- 1. "Oh, Barbarella" / "Olyan szépen mosolygott" Released: 1971

Éjszakai országút (literal translation: Night highway) is the third studio album by the Hungarian rock band Omega, released in 1970. It was the last band album with keyboardist/vocalist Gábor Presser and drummer József Laux, who departed and formed Locomotiv GT.

== Track listing ==
All tracks are written by Gábor Presser/Anna Adamis, except where extrad.

Side one
No.	Title	English translation	Length
1.	"Oh, jöjj!"	Oh, Come!	4:01
2.	"Ahol a boldogságot osztották!"	Where They Gave Away The Happiness	4:15
3.	"Maradj velem"	Stay with Me	4:24
4.	"Oh, Barbarella"		3:08
5.	"H., az elektromos fűrész" (György Molnár)	H., The Chain Saw	4:21
6.	"Az éjszakai országúton"	On the Country Road at Night	3:45

Side two
No.	Title	English translation	Length
1.	"Utcán, a téren"	On the Street, At the Plaza	2:51
2.	"Van egy szó"	There Is One Word	3:21
3.	"Utazás a szürke folyón" (Molnár/Adamis)	Trip on the Grey River	5:41
4.	"Olyan szépen mosolygott"	She Smiled So Nicely	2:58
5.	"Egy kis pihenő" (Omega)	A Brief Pause	1:09
6.	"Vészkijárat"	Emergency Exit	5:13

== Personnel ==
- János Kóbor – lead vocals
- Gábor Presser – organ, piano, vibraphone, backing vocals, lead vocal (A2, A4)
- Laszlo Benkő – flute, trumpet, piano, backing vocal
- Tamas Mihály – bass guitar, cello, backing vocals
- György Molnár – guitar
- József Laux – drums, percussion
