= Kaposvár Arena =

Arena in Kaposvár, Hungary

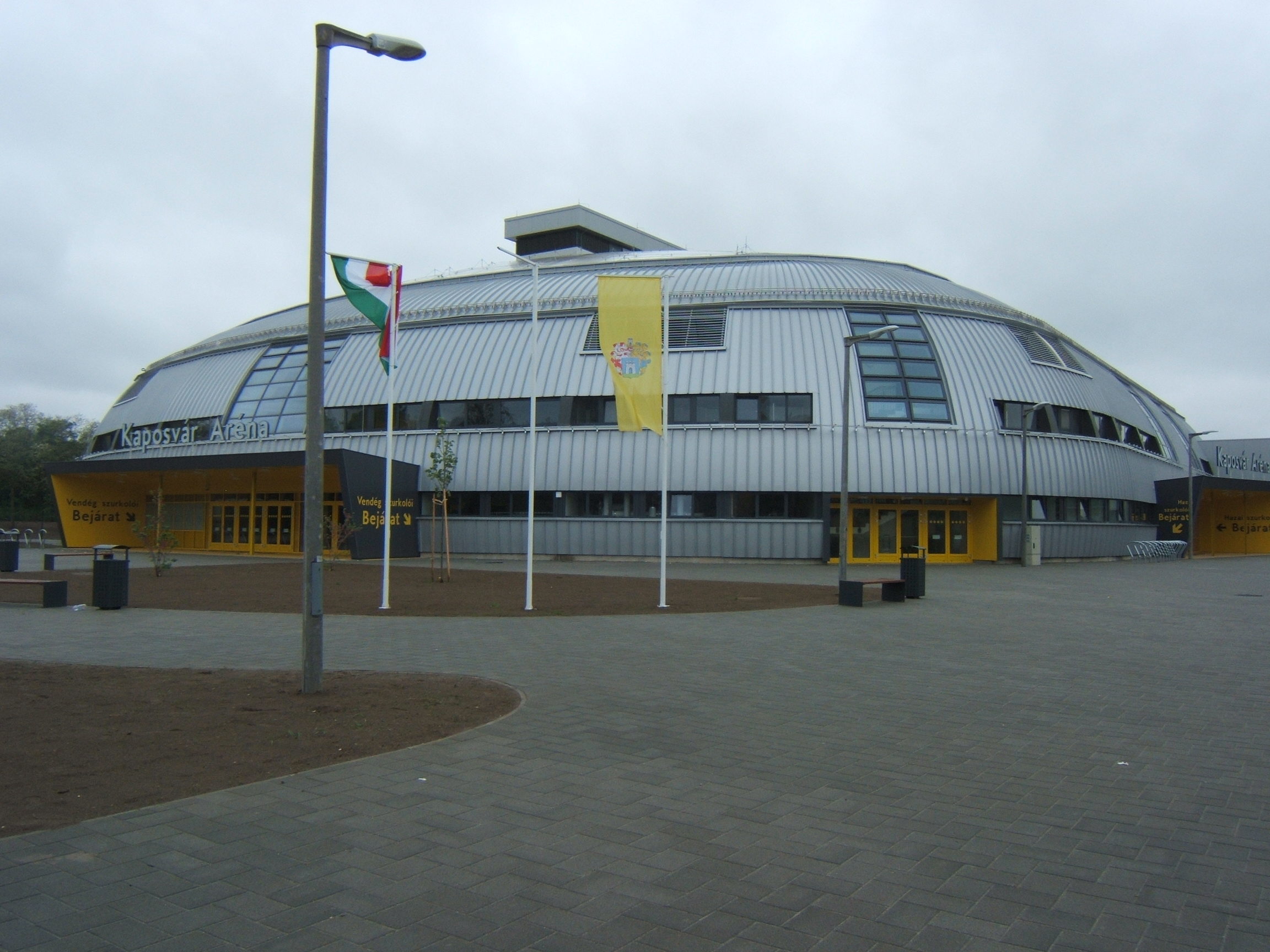
- Interactive map of Kaposvár Arena
- Address: Kaposvár; Hungary
- Coordinates: 46°22′09″N 17°47′37″E
- Capacity: 3,000 (sporting events); 4,000 (cultural events)

Construction
- Opened: 4 May 2019; 7 years ago
- Cost: Ft 5.7 billion

Kaposvár Arena (Hungarian: Kaposvár Aréna) is an arena in Kaposvár, Hungary. Its construction began in 2017 and was opened in May 2019. It is designed to accommodate approximately 3,000 people for basketball and volleyball events, 2,000 people for handball matches, and 4,000 people for other events, such as cultural events.

== History ==
Landscaping around the building began in the summer of 2018, including the creation of 460 parking spaces. At the beginning of November, they had already laid parquet flooring, installed the first seats in the auditorium, and replaced the large "Kaposvár Aréna" sign on the outside of the building.

On October 25, 2019, the band Omega performed at the arena.
