= 10000 lépés =

Studio album by Omega
- Released: 10 October 1969
- Genres: Rock; progressive rock; hard rock; psychedelic rock
- Length: 44:24
- Language: Hungarian
- Label: Qualiton

Omega chronology
Trombitás Frédi és a rettenetes emberek (1968)	10000 lépés (1969)	Éjszakai országút (1970)

Singles from 10000 lépés
- 1. "Petróleumlámpa" / "Gyöngyhajú lány" Released: 1970

Professional ratings
Review scores
Source	Rating
AllMusic	3/5 stars

10000 lépés (literal translation: 10,000 steps) is the second studio album by the Hungarian rock band Omega. It was released on 10 October 1969 by Qualiton Records.

== Track listing ==
All tracks are written by Gábor Presser and Anna Adamis, except where noted.

Side One
No.	Title	Writer(s)	English translation	Length
1.	"Petróleumlámpa"		Petroleum Lamp	3:14
2.	"Gyöngyhajú lány"		Girl with Pearly Hair	5:49
3.	"Tűzvihar"	Adamis; György Molnár	Firestorm	3:09
4.	"Udvari bolond kenyere"		Bread of the Court Jester	3:32
5.	"Kérgeskezű favágók"	Presser; József Laux	Callous Handed Woodcutters	8:15

Side Two
No.	Title	Writer(s)	English translation	Length
1.	"Tékozló fiúk"		Prodigal Sons	4:34
2.	"Tízezer lépés"		Ten-thousand Steps	6:13
3.	"Az 1958-as boogie-woogie klubban"		In the 1958's Boogie-Woogie Club	2:14
4.	"Spanyolgitár legenda"	Adamis; Tamás Mihály	Legend of the Spanish Guitar	3:24
5.	"Félbeszakadt koncert"	Adamis; János Kóbor	Interrupted Concert	4:00
Total length:				44:18

Bonus tracks (2003 edition)
No.	Title	Writer(s)	English translation	Length
1.	"Halott virágok"		Dead Flowers	1:56
2.	"Nem tilthatom meg"	Presser; István S. Nagy	I Can't Forbid	4:15
3.	"Volt egy bohóc"		There Was a Clown	4:09
4.	"Régi csibészek"		Old Scoundrels	2:35
5.	"Naplemente"		Sunset	4:05

== Personnel ==
- János Kóbor – lead vocals
- Gábor Presser – keyboards, background vocals; lead vocals (B2, B3)
- Laszló Benkő – keyboards, trumpet, background vocals
- Tamás Mihály – bass guitar, background vocals; lead vocals (B4)
- György Molnár – guitar
- József Laux – drums, percussion

== Release history ==
- LP Qualiton Records LPX 17400 (1969 Hungary)
- CD Mega Records HCD 37585 (1992 Hungary)
- CD Hungaroton HCD 17400 (2003 Hungary) (with 5 bonus tracks 11–15)
