= The White Dove =

The White Dove may refer to:

- The White Dove (Danish fairy tale)
- The White Dove (French fairy tale)
- The White Dove (1920 film), an American film directed by Henry King
- The White Dove (1942 film), a Spanish film directed by Claudio de la Torre
- The White Dove (1960 film), a Czechoslovak film directed by František Vláčil
- "The White Dove", a 1949 song by the Stanley Brothers

== See also ==
- White dove (disambiguation)
