= Black Skinhead =

Single by Kanye West

from the album Yeezus
- Released: June 19, 2013
- Recorded: 2012 – May 2013
- Genre: Industrial hip hop; punk rap
- Length: 3:08
- Label: Def Jam
- Songwriters: Kanye West; Guy-Manuel de Homem-Christo; Thomas Bangalter; Cydel Young; Malik Jones; Elon Rutberg; Wasalu Jaco; Sakiya Sandifer; Mike Dean; Derrick Watkins
- Producers: West; Daft Punk; Gesaffelstein (Note: Credited as an additional producer); Brodinski; Dean; Lupe Fiasco; Jack Donoghue; Noah Goldstein

Kanye West singles chronology
"Diamonds" (remix) (2012)	"Black Skinhead" (2013)	"Bound 2" (2013)

Music video
- "Black Skinhead" on YouTube

Yeezus track listing
- 10 tracks: 1. "On Sight"; 2. "Black Skinhead"; 3. "I Am a God"; 4. "New Slaves"; 5. "Hold My Liquor"; 6. "I'm in It"; 7. "Blood on the Leaves"; 8. "Guilt Trip"; 9. "Send It Up"; 10. "Bound 2"

"Black Skinhead" (also stylized as "BLKKK SKKKN HEAD") is a song by American rapper Kanye West, from his sixth studio album Yeezus (2013). It was produced by West and Daft Punk. The song's lyrics center on racial tensions and the crumbling mental state of the character West portrays on the album. The song premiered on Saturday Night Live in May 2013, with West performing it in front of a projected backdrop. He has since performed the song live on various occasions, including at the Glastonbury Festival and the Billboard Music Awards in 2015. It was universally praised by music critics and ranked by numerous sites, including Rolling Stone and NME, as one of the best tracks of 2013. The song's accompanying music video was directed by Nick Knight and features computer-generated imagery of West, with interactive options including "screen grabbing" and adjusting the speed of his vocals. The video was released in July 2013 and has received positive reviews from critics.

Although West initially said Yeezus would have no singles, "Black Skinhead" became the first single released from the album. It was serviced to contemporary hit radio stations in the United Kingdom one day after the album's release. On July 2, 2013, the single was sent to urban contemporary radio stations in the United States. The song charted in the United States, the United Kingdom, Ireland, France, Canada, Belgium and Australia in 2013 and 2014. It has since been certified platinum in the United States, the United Kingdom and Denmark. American singer Jack White covered the song in June 2014. A remix featuring Miley Cyrus and Travis Scott, recorded shortly after the 2013 MTV Video Music Awards, leaked online in January 2016.

== Background and development ==
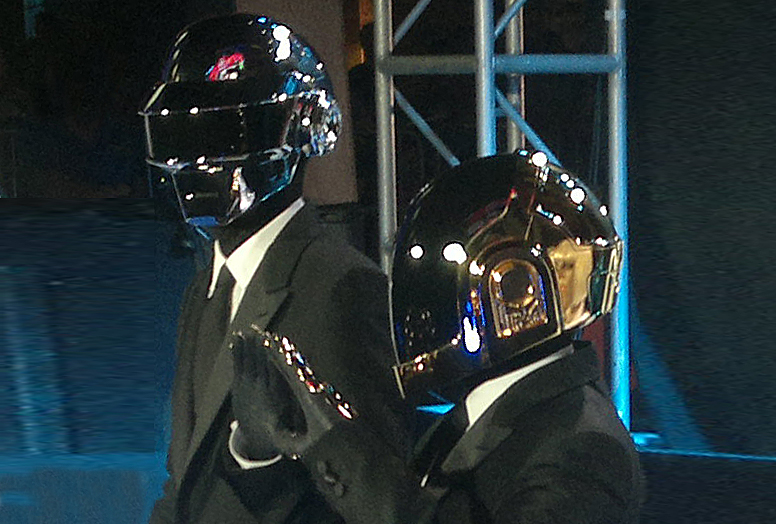
Daft Punk, pictured in 2010, helped co-produce the song with West.

"Black Skinhead" features production by French duo Daft Punk (Guy-Manuel de Homem-Christo and Thomas Bangalter), the album's major producers, who had worked with West on "On Sight", "I Am a God" and "Send It Up". West first became involved with the duo when he sampled their track "Harder, Better, Faster, Stronger" in 2007 for his chart-topping single "Stronger". Bangalter revealed in an April 2013 interview discussing their album Random Access Memories that they had found time during the recording sessions in Paris to work with West on material for his next album. The duo laid down a combination of live and programmed drums over West's initial vocals. Bangalter described the process as "very raw." He later said Daft Punk "were the first people that Kanye came to" for his album. "Black Skinhead" was the first song recorded by the duo for Yeezus. The drums originated from unused material that had been recorded for Random Access Memories. Daft Punk described using the drums as "a great twist of pushing the envelope." Before the album's liner notes confirmed otherwise, many speculated that the song's beat was sampled from "The Beautiful People" by American rock band Marilyn Manson.

The song's title uses "skinhead", which originated as a description of a 1960s British working-class male subculture whose members often had closely cropped hair. It revolved around fashion and music and went on to inspire the punk rock scene. Despite attracting young males across the political spectrum, the term had come to be popularly associated with neo-Nazis at the time of single's release. Travis Scott said of his initial reaction to the song: "I jumped off the stairs onto the couch. I was going HAM. That was when I heard the 'na na na na' part for the first time, I lost my fucking mind. That's some soccer anthem-type shit." According to co-producer Mike Dean, the song was almost left off Yeezus for sounding "too much like a soccer song." In November 2013, co-writer Lupe Fiasco still felt unsure what the song was supposed to be about. He described it as "a lot of emotional, a lot of this, a lot of cliché, a lot of kinda stuff balled in together, and it's just supposed to be presented as a package and you digest it."

West and Miley Cyrus skipped the after party for the 2013 MTV Video Music Awards on August 25, 2013, to record her remix of the song. The pair also worked on other tracks during the recording session—possibly for use on her then-upcoming album Bangerz. Producer Mike Will Made It took part in the session, having added some production to the remix of "Black Skinhead". The remix leaked on January 21, 2016, and was revealed to feature Travis Scott and Miley Cyrus. The track heavily samples Tears for Fears' 1985 song, "Everybody Wants to Rule the World" from their album Songs from the Big Chair and features Cyrus singing a rendition of the hook. West uploaded a slightly different version of "Black Skinhead" exclusively on Apple Music in April 2016. The song's opening lines were changed to retain more distorted vocals.

== Composition ==
"Black Skinhead"
A 22 second sample of the first verse on "Black Skinhead", which includes West enveloping the Yeezus character in black.

"Black Skinhead" has an industrial-sounding beat, and is part of the Yeezus character's opening segment of gnarled electro and pounding industrial rap. West begins the song with the lines: "For my theme song/My leather black jeans on/My by-any-means on" a reference to "Good Morning", the opening track of his third studio album Graduation. These lines use a "simple aesthetic touch"—leather black jeans—to envelop Yeezus, the character West portrays, in black, rugged gear. This reflects his awareness, expressed on his 2005 single "Diamonds from Sierra Leone", that money and possessions are often equated with self-worth by young black men. The old West is gone. "Black Skinhead" is "now his theme music. This grimy, grungy tone that doesn't require just any jeans, but leather black jeans." The song's lyrics do not mention Malcolm X or the Civil Rights Movement. "But when we make the connections between 'by any means necessary' (Malcolm's famous phrase) and the jeans call-back to 'Good Morning,' and the reference to a cultural movement associated with rebellion, the ghost of Malcolm X and the Civil Rights Movement of the '50s and '60s comes alive." Yeezus views himself as not only a political leader for the Black community, but a superhero. West raps: "Pardon, I'm getting my scream on" in the fourth line and screams in frustration throughout the song. The rest of song sees Yeezus discussing "racial tensions and his own crumbling mental state." The "manic repetition" of "Black" shows there is "so much more at stake" for him. West ends the song by repeating "God!" in an exasperated way. Yeezus is a "leader frustrated by the inaction of his people: 'These niggas ain't doin' shit'." He "mutates the external idea of God into an internal one", which leads into the next track "I Am a God" where he "hypes himself up."

== Release and promotion ==
Before the album's release, West performed "Black Skinhead" on the May 18, 2013, broadcast of the American sketch comedy television series Saturday Night Live, where he also performed "New Slaves". He performed the song in front of a projected backdrop, which alternated between abstractly disturbing black-and-white imagery with colorful vintage price tags and the declaration "Not for sale." His performance was met with positive critical reviews. Chris Martins of Spin described it as providing "the sort of aplomb and production value that the show hasn't felt since ... well, probably the last time West visited", noting "'Black Skinhead' documents Ye's dynamic transition from rap champ to rock star." Stereogum's Liz Pelly branded the song an "aggressive new track" and claimed that "West's stage presence on SNL was full of rage." Philip Cosores of Paste commented on the performance, writing: "The song comes from somewhere usually only seen in small clubs or basements, and the images of vicious dogs adds to the focal point, the angriest dog in a sense." After the performance, Daft Punk were revealed as the song's composers and West shared a photo of the handwritten lyrics via Twitter. Although West initially said no singles would be released from the album, "Black Skinhead" was released on June 18, 2013. It is the second track on West's sixth studio album Yeezus, and was sent to UK contemporary hit radio stations on June 19. West had previously spoken about avoiding a full-court press roll-out for his album, saying at a listening session in New York: "I have this new strategy, it's called no strategy." On June 28, 2013, Def Jam Recordings confirmed the song would be serviced to US radio stations as the first single from Yeezus at the same time as a clean version was released to DJs. The label also revealed that a music video for the song was in production. Following the announcement, "Black Skinhead" was released officially on July 2 to US urban contemporary radio stations. West was set to perform the song at the 2013 MTV Video Music Awards on August 25, 2013, but ended up performing "Blood on the Leaves" instead.

== Critical reception ==
"Black Skinhead" received universal acclaim from music critics. Ray Rahman of Entertainment Weekly cited it as one of the album's best songs, describing it as "a galloping punk-rap manifesto". The staff of Popdust rated the song five out of five, describing it as what "would've sounded at home on Top 40 in the late-'00s, at least if you stripped away all the growling bass and the background yelps and turned the drums down in the mix considerably". The Guardian's Alexis Petridis pointed out "the battering bovver-glam drum and sampled screaming of 'Black Skinhead'" is an example on the album where, "West appears to be operating under the influence of industrial music". This song and "Hold My Liquor" were classified by Phil Witmer of Noisey as "rock anthems from the 25th century" not rap. He described "Black Skinhead" as "soundtracking a mosh pit of cyborgs". Jon Pareles of The New York Times described West as "angry" as he snarls "over a track that switches between a blunt glam-rock drumbeat and a distorted synthesizer line." Digital Spy's Robert Copsey felt with "Black Skinhead" West is "erratically accusing middle America of racism ('You see a black man with a white woman at the top floor/ they gon' come to kill King Kong') over a rumbling tribal beat". Copsey claims this is an example of how Yeezus's lyrics range from "insightful [and] irritatingly arrogant, to the plain bonkers."

=== Accolades ===
Rolling Stone named "Black Skinhead" the third-best song of 2013, saying: "'Ye rapping rabid over an industrial glitter-rock stomp pumped with heavy breathing and Tarzan screams. Next time someone says America is post-race, play 'em this, and watch their head explode." It was chosen as Billboard sixth-best song of the year, with the staff describing it as "raw, unadulterated and unstoppable." NME named it the tenth-best song of 2013, writing: "There isn't a more fascinating pop star in the world than Kanye West right now. 'Black Skinhead' was a microcosm of why that's the case: three breathless and almost-punk minutes that covered the central complexes – ego, messiah and persecution – of his dark and twisted psyche." Ranked 43rd by Spin, their staff said that "Our Lord and Savior Yeezus Christ blacks out about mass incarceration and never-not-mutating racism atop a vaporous mountain of Louis Vuitton pipedreams." The song earned a nomination at the 2013 BET Hip Hop Awards for Impact Track, and World's Best Song at the 2013 World Music Awards.

== Music video ==
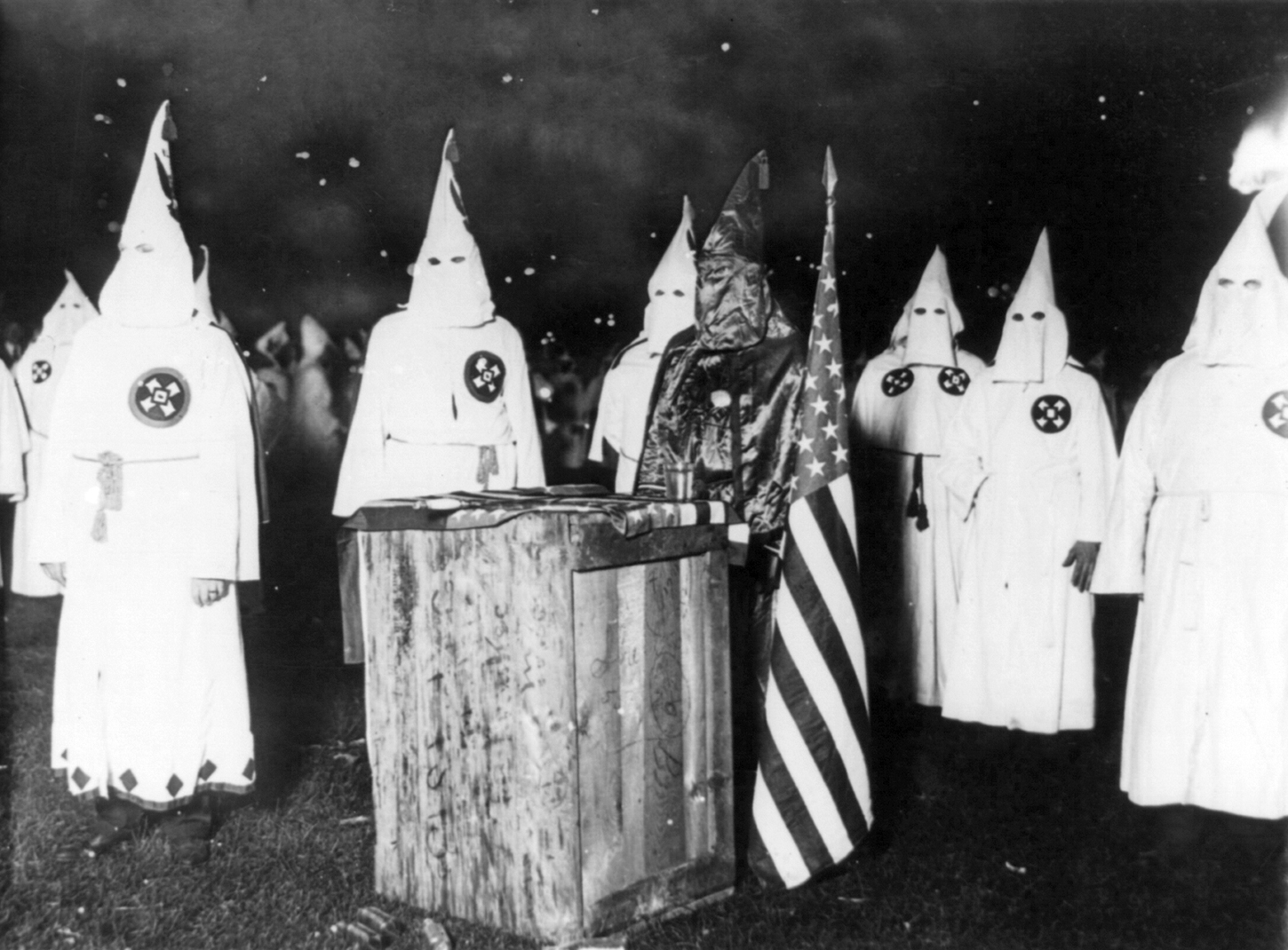
Figures in the video wear hoodies similar to those worn by the Ku Klux Klan, pictured in 1920.

For the five months leading up to the single's announcement, West worked on a music video for "Black Skinhead" with photographer Nick Knight. The music video was leaked to the Internet on July 8, 2013. Shortly afterwards, West stated via Twitter that the leaked version of the video was incomplete and released without his approval; the song's title was stylized as "BLKKK SKKKN HD" in the tweet. On July 21, 2013, the final version was officially released as an interactive video on West's website. Its interactive portion allows users to control the video's speed down to almost one-sixteenth the normal rate, as well as take screenshots for use on social media platforms. The user's cursor changes to that of a black hand giving the finger when interacting with the video. Pitchfork Media noted that apart from interactivity, the video itself is identical to the version that was leaked ahead of the single's release.

The video opens with three figures wearing black conical hoods, reminiscent of those worn by the Ku Klux Klan; the hoods form a black border that envelops most of the screen, while the silhouettes of the outlying cones stay on each end. The music video has a blurred black-and-white background within it. The primary action takes place in the middle portion of the screen occupied by a shirtless, computer-generated version of West, wearing a long chain and leather pants It raps the song's lyrics and dances. West appears in various forms: a rough, spiky animatic; a silhouetted model; one whose upper torso save the face is covered in talc; a heavily muscled version; and a nude version with rows of subdermal implants on the shoulders and chest. Interspersed with his figure are several brief flashes of snarling dobermanns and other predatory animals.

=== Reception ===
The music video for "Black Skinhead" received praise from critics. Harriet Gibsone of The Guardian described it as "demand[ing] your attention, and so it should", calling it "a startling vision of West's most ferocious track". Kyle Anderson of Entertainment Weekly viewed the music video as something that "looks pretty awesome", writing: "It's impressive, though honestly it's not nearly as good a promotional clip for 'Black Skinhead' as the trailer for The Wolf of Wall Street."

Consequence of Sound placed it 11th on its list of the 25 best music videos of 2013. Rolling Stone named it the ninth best music video of 2013.

At the 2013 Antville Music Video Awards, it was nominated for Best Hip-Hop Video. It was also a nominee for Best Hip-Hop Video at the 2013 MTV Video Music Awards.

== Commercial performance ==
After its release as a single in the United States, "Black Skinhead" entered charts in North America. The track debuted at number 69 on the US Billboard Hot 100. In the same week as its Hot 100 debut, the track also entered at number 21 on the US Hot R&B/Hip-Hop Songs chart. On the Canadian Hot 100, the song reached number 66.

The track charted in several countries worldwide. After being released as a single in the United Kingdom on June 19, 2013, "Black Skinhead" debuted at number 48 on the UK Singles Chart and eventually peaked at number 34. It remained there for a total of 16 weeks and ranked as the 197th best-selling single of 2013 in the United Kingdom. In Scotland, the track also reached the top 40, charting at number 31 on the Scottish Singles Chart. The track reached number 55 on the Irish Singles Chart and charted at number 58 and 59 on the ARIA Singles Chart and the Belgium Ultratip Flanders chart respectively. Its lowest chart position was in France at number 105 on the SNEP chart.

On October 17, 2014, "Black Skinhead" was certified Platinum in Denmark, and in the United States by the RIAA on October 13, 2015. "Black Skinhead" went Platinum in the United Kingdom on November 23, 2018.

As of 2017, "Black Skinhead" is the 89th best-selling hip-hop song of all time in the UK.

== Live performances ==
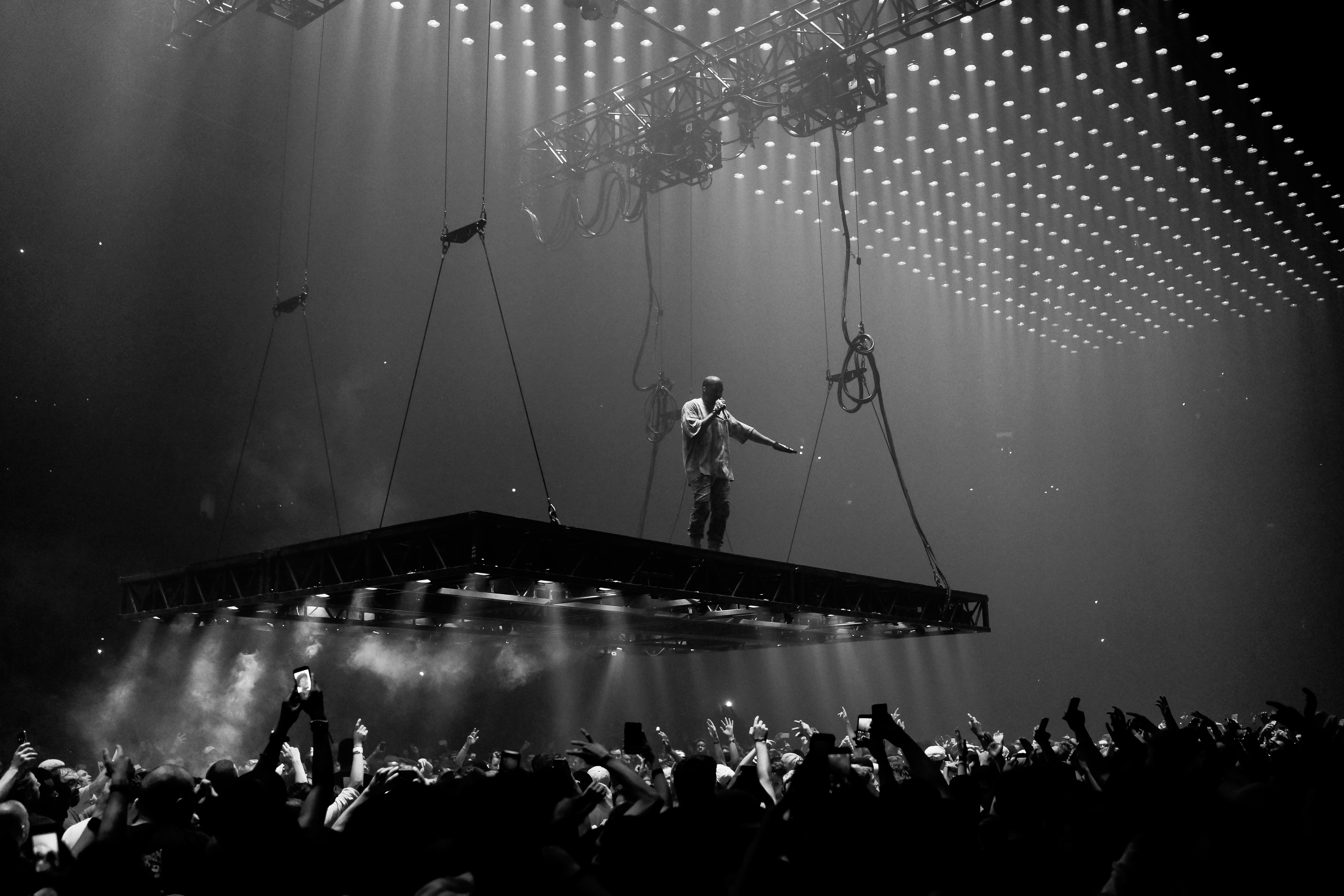
West performed the song on the Saint Pablo Tour in 2016.

In addition to his pre-release performance on Saturday Night Live on May 18, 2013, West performed a version live in black-and-white, with a new intro and outro, on the French TV show Le Grand Journal on September 23. It ended with West collapsing on stage. Canadian rapper Drake brought West out at the fourth annual OVO Fest, where he performed the song while Drake stood beside him and waved his arm. As the opener for his set at the 2014 Wireless Festival, West ended the performance lying on his back. He also performed it in a surprise live gig at KOKO in March 2015. At the 2015 Billboard Music Awards, West segued into "Black Skinhead" from a performance of "All Day". He was censored at intervals during his performance, with lyrics such as "My leather black jeans on" muted. West was audible to home viewers for only four minutes and 16 seconds of his five-minute, 18 second performance. During his headline set at the 2015 Glastonbury Festival, his performance was restarted after it was interrupted by comedian Lee Nelson wearing a "Leezus" T-shirt. West performed the song live on the opening show of his Saint Pablo Tour in Indianapolis on August 25, 2016. He would perform it again with added instrumentation from an electric guitar for the Free Larry Hoover Benefit Concert at the Los Angeles Memorial Coliseum on December 9, 2021.

== In popular culture ==
Since its release, "Black Skinhead" has appeared in various media. The song was first featured in a trailer for the 2013 crime film The Wolf of Wall Street. A mashup of it with "The Beautiful People" by Marilyn Manson was played by American DJ Girl Talk at a North Carolina show in July 2013. American rapper Angel Haze freestyled over the song in October 2013 as part of their 30 Gold series. In June 2014, a cover version was performed by American singer Jack White as the opener to his live concert in Dublin, Ireland. A mashup of "Black Skinhead" and "Shoot the Runner" by Kasabian was performed by indie rock band Catfish and the Bottlemen on the BBC Radio 1 Live Lounge in February 2015.

The song was used for the Guinness's "Made of Black" campaign from 2014 which aired across several African countries. The song was also used in a 2015 television advert for Sky Bet. It was used in the opening scene for the 2016 period drama TV series Underground, and a cover by Jacques Slade, THURZ & El Prez was featured in the 2016 American comedy film Neighbors 2: Sorority Rising. The song was used in the 2016 American superhero film Suicide Squad, and in the trailer for the 2017 American action thriller spy film Atomic Blonde as part of a mashup with "Personal Jesus" by English electronic band Depeche Mode. The track is part of the soundtrack for the 2017 video game WWE 2K18. Jaden Smith sampled the song on "Watch Me" from his debut album Syre (2017). The track appeared in a 2018 car commercial for the Toyota Camry. The song was used in a trailer for the Android smartphone Motorola Moto X in 2013. "Black Skinhead" is one of the penalty kill songs that NHL team Colorado Avalanche use. The Toronto Marlies of the AHL has used it as its goal song since the 2015 - 2016 season. Billie Eilish revealed that "Black Skinhead" inspired her single "Bury a Friend". In 2020, Bono included the song on a list of 60 songs that "saved his life". Why Don't We sampled "Black Skinhead" in their 2020 single "Fallin' (Adrenaline)".

== Credits and personnel ==
Credits adapted from the Yeezus liner notes.

- Songwriter – Kanye West, Guy-Manuel de Homem-Christo, Thomas Bangalter, Malik Jones, Cydel Young, Elon Rutberg, Wasalu Muhammad Jaco, Sakiya Sandifer, Mike Dean and Derrick Watkins
- Producer – Kanye West and Daft Punk
- Additional production – Gesaffelstein, Brodinski, Mike Dean, Lupe Fiasco, Jack Donoghue, and Noah Goldstein
- Engineer – Noah Goldstein, Anthony Kilhoffer, and Mike Dean
- Mix – Manny Marroquin at Larrabee Studios, Los Angeles, CA
- Mix assisted – Delbert Bowers and Chris Galland
- Mastering – Chris Gehringer at Sterling Sound & Vlado Meller at Masterdisk, NYC

== Charts ==
=== Weekly charts ===
Chart performance for "Black Skinhead"
Chart (2013–14)	Peak position
Australia (ARIA)	58
Belgium (Ultratip Bubbling Under Flanders)	59
Belgium Urban (Ultratop Flanders)	24
Canada Hot 100 (Billboard)	66
France (SNEP)	105
Ireland (IRMA)	55
Mexico Ingles Airplay (Billboard)	35
Scottish Singles Sales (Official Charts)	31
UK Singles (Official Charts)	34
UK Hip Hop/R&B (Official Charts)	6
US Billboard Hot 100	69
US Hot R&B/Hip-Hop Songs (Billboard)	21

=== Year-end charts ===
2013 year-end chart performance for "Black Skinhead"
Chart (2013)	Rank
Australia Urban (ARIA)	46
UK Singles (OCC)	197

2014 year-end chart performance for "Black Skinhed"
Chart (2014)	Rank
Australia Urban (ARIA)	50

== Certifications ==
Certifications for "Black Skinhead"
Region	Certification	Certified units/sales
Brazil (Pro-Música Brasil)	Gold	30,000^{‡}
Italy (FIMI)	Gold	25,000^{‡}
New Zealand (RMNZ)	2× Platinum	60,000^{‡}
United Kingdom (BPI)	Platinum	600,000^{‡}
United States (RIAA)	3× Platinum	3,000,000^{‡}
Streaming
Denmark (IFPI Danmark)	Platinum	2,600,000^{†}
^{‡} Sales+streaming figures based on certification alone.^{†} Streaming-only figures based on certification alone.

== Release history ==
Release dates and formats for "Black Skinhead"
Region	Date	Format	Label	Ref.
United Kingdom	June 19, 2013	Contemporary hit radio	Def Jam	
United States	July 2, 2013	Urban contemporary radio	Def Jam	
