= Little White Dove =

1973 Chilean film

- Film poster
- Directed by: Raúl Ruiz
- Written by: Enrique Lafourcade
- Starring: Beatriz Lapido
- Cinematography: Silvio Caiozzi
- Edited by: Carlos Piaggio
- Music by: Los Jaivas
- Release date: 6 November 1992
- Running time: 125 minutes
- Country: Chile
- Language: Spanish

Little White Dove (Spanish: Palomita blanca) is a 1973 Chilean teen dramedy film directed by Raúl Ruiz. It is loosely based on the bestselling 1971 teen novel Palomita Blanca by Enrique Lafourcade. As a result of the 1973 Chilean coup d'état and military dictatorship (1973–1990), the film was presumed lost for many years and not released until 1992.

== Plot ==
Little White Dove (Palomita Blanca) tells the story of Juan Carlos and María, two teenagers from different walks of life who fall in love at an outdoor hippie music festival in 1970s Chile. The film explores Juan and Maria's relationship in the light of immense social change and increasing political turmoil in South America.

== Production ==
The film was shot in 1973 over six weeks with a budget of $170,000. It was completed just days before the military coup led by Augusto Pinochet on September 11, which overthrew the government of Salvador Allende. The film was scheduled for release on September 18, but never made it to theatres. In October of that year, a private screening was organized for influential critics and representatives of the military dictatorship. Despite assurances that the film would be released, it remained locked away due to its "political" content, nude scenes and strong language.

The film was finally released almost twenty years later in 1992 to critical acclaim after being re-edited by Raúl Ruiz. The accompanying soundtrack by Los Jaivas was also released in 1992.

=== Lost documentary ===
During the casting process for the film, a behind-the-scenes documentary called Palomilla Brava was also shot simultaneously. This "making of" project was the first of its kind in South American cinema. It was conceived by director Raul Ruiz as a way of exposing and deterring producer Hugo Ortega's inappropriate behaviour towards female actors. The documentary was also intended to provide a critical look at the local film industry's casting process.

The whereabouts of Palomilla Brava are unknown, as it disappeared along with the original film cans. Sergio Trabucco, the film's producer, has lamented the loss of the documentary as it provided valuable material for understanding young actors and their struggles within the local film industry in 1970s Chile.

== Cast ==
- Beatriz Lapido as María
- Rodrigo Ureta as Juan Carlos
- Bélgica Castro as María's godmother
- Luis Alarcón as María's stepfather
- Manuel Aranguiz
- Maria Castiglione as María's mother
- Mónica Echeverría as Juan Carlos' mother
- Marcial Edwards as Cristián, Juan Carlos' brother
- Felisa González as Telma
- Rodrigo Maturana as María's schoolteacher
