= New Slaves =

2013 song by Kanye West

Song by Kanye West

from the album Yeezus
- Released: June 18, 2013
- Recorded: December 19, 2012 – 2013
- Studio: No Name Hotel (Paris); Germano (New York City); Shangri-La (Malibu, CA)
- Genre: Industrial hip hop; political rap; gothic rock
- Length: 4:16
- Label: Def Jam; Roc-A-Fella
- Songwriters: Kanye West; Christopher Breaux; Cydel Young; Ben Bronfman; Malik Jones; Che Smith; Elon Rutberg; Sakiya Sandifer; Louis Johnson; Mike Dean; Gábor Presser; Anna Adamis
- Producer: Kanye West

Yeezus track listing
- 10 tracks: 1. "On Sight"; 2. "Black Skinhead"; 3. "I Am a God"; 4. "New Slaves"; 5. "Hold My Liquor"; 6. "I'm in It"; 7. "Blood on the Leaves"; 8. "Guilt Trip"; 9. "Send It Up"; 10. "Bound 2"

"New Slaves" is a song by American rapper Kanye West from his sixth studio album, Yeezus (2013). The song features additional vocals from Frank Ocean. It was produced by West and co-produced by Benjamin Bronfman, while Mike Dean, Noah Goldstein, Travis Scott, Sham Joseph, and Che Pope contributed additional production. West, Bronfman, and Dean co-wrote the song with Ocean, Cyhi the Prynce, Malik Yusef, Rhymefest, Elon Rutberg, Sakiya Sandifer, King Louie, and Anna Adamis, with Gábor Presser receiving credit due to a sample of his composition. In May 2013, the song was previewed by Hudson Mohawke at the Polish Free Form Festival and formally announced by Virgil Abloh. West debuted it with video projections of him rapping on buildings worldwide in locations like Los Angeles, London, and Amsterdam.

An industrial hip hop, political rap, and gothic rock song with electro and heavy metal elements, the production of "New Slaves" is minimalist and based on synths. The song samples "Gyöngyhajú lány" by Omega and "HBA War" by Dutch E Germ. Lyrically, West discusses racial politics as he connects black people's wealth classes to how consumerism holds them back. The song received widespread acclaim from music critics, who mostly highlighted West's lyrical message about racism. Some commended the style of the industrial production and saw it as an album highlight, while a few critics praised Ocean's contributions. The song was listed as one of the best tracks of 2013 by multiple publications, including Complex and Paste. At the 56th Annual Grammy Awards, it received a nomination for Best Rap Song.

In the United States, "New Slaves" reached number 56 on the Billboard Hot 100 and was certified gold by the Recording Industry Association of America. West first performed it live on Saturday Night Live in May 2013, backed by projections of his face and discount price tag images. Later that year, he performed the song during The Yeezus Tour (2013–14). West stated that its second verse was the best rap verse of all time in July 2013. Presser issued a lawsuit over the song's allegedly unauthorized sample of "Gyöngyhajú lány" in May 2016, accusing West of not having made a formal deal. The two reached an undisclosed out-of-court settlement in March 2017, although it was reported that Presser had known of the sample prior to release. Hit-Boy re-worked the song on "New Chains" in July 2013, which was inspired by the freedom of James Somersett.

== Background ==
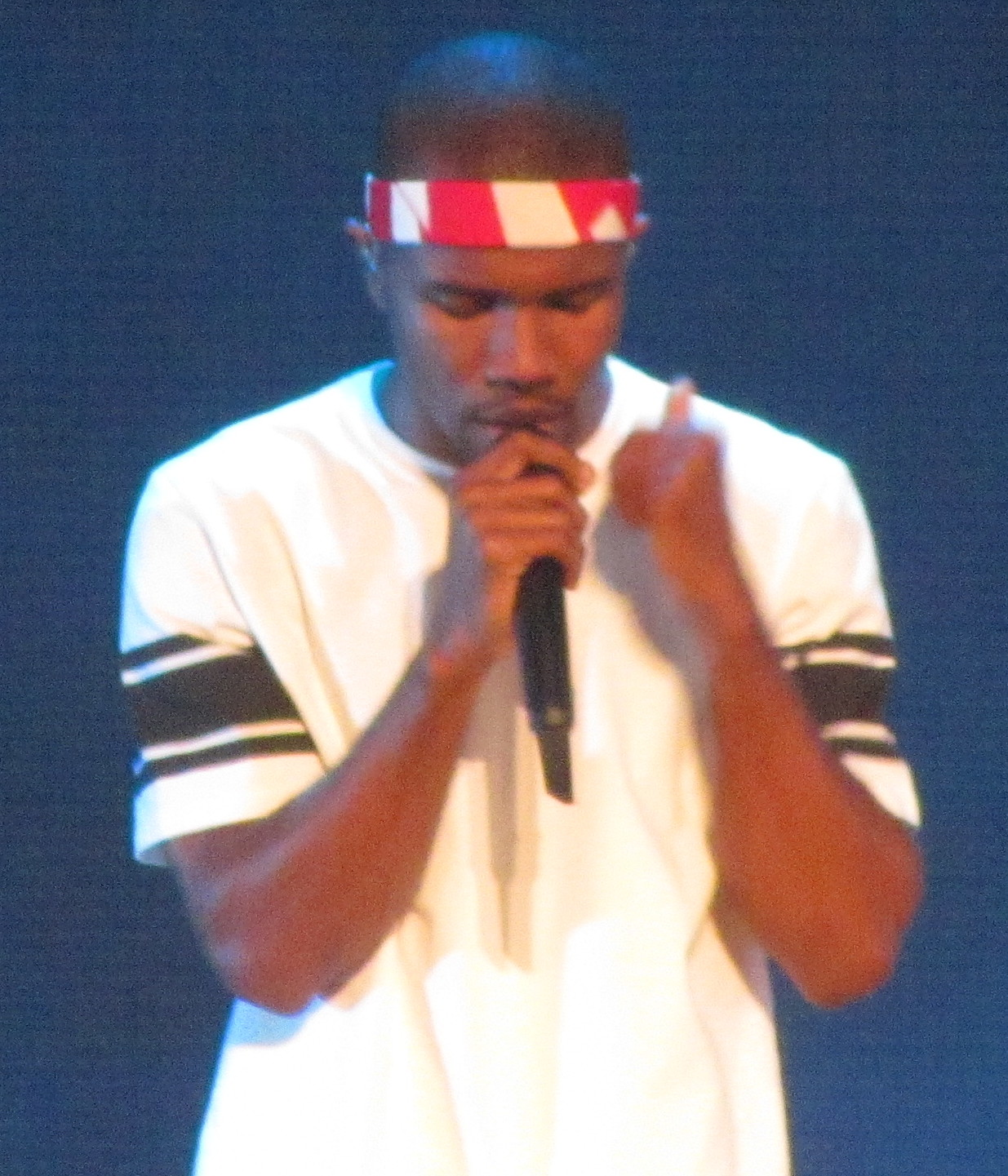
The song features a guest appearance from Frank Ocean, which was first revealed at the song's video projections in May 2013.

In 2011, singer Frank Ocean was featured on the tracks "No Church in the Wild" and "Made in America" for Kanye West and fellow rapper Jay-Z's collaborative album Watch the Throne. After the appearances, Ocean developed more of a following and embarked on a tour for his debut album Channel Orange (2012). Ocean appeared on "New Slaves" in 2013, the same year as his feature on Jay-Z's song "Oceans". The singer's vocals on the song were revealed during West's video projections prior to release, with his mother confirming the appearance via Twitter. "New Slaves" was produced by West and co-produced by Benjamin Bronfman, with additional production from Mike Dean, Noah Goldstein, Sham Joseph, Che Pope, and GOOD Music signee Travis Scott. The first three producers served as songwriters with Ocean, Cyhi the Prynce, Malik Yusef, Rhymefest, Elon Rutberg, Sakiya Sandifer, King Louie, and Anna Adamis, with Hungarian composer Gábor Presser receiving a songwriting credit due to the sample of "Gyöngyhajú lány". After Yeezus production consultant Arca introduced West to "HBA War" by Dutch E Germ, he sampled it on the track.

On May 12, 2013, Scottish producer Hudson Mohawke previewed the song during his set at the Polish Free Form Festival. The preview featured the phrase "new slaves" repeatedly, although the title was not officially known nor if it would be on the album at the time. "New Slaves" was subsequently confirmed as the title by West confidant and fashion designer Virgil Abloh, and the song was also announced to be part of Yeezus. A 73-second snippet of the studio version was leaked to SoundCloud on June 5, 2013, becoming the first leak from the album. In a 2014 interview with Zach Baron of GQ, West recalled having engaged in around 30 meetings where he was advised to "Stay in your place". West elaborated that the conversations encouraged to "Stay in your box" and not go outside of his creative reach, which moved him to create tracks such as "New Slaves" and "Blood on the Leaves" for Yeezus, ideally setting out "a protest in music".

== Composition and lyrics ==
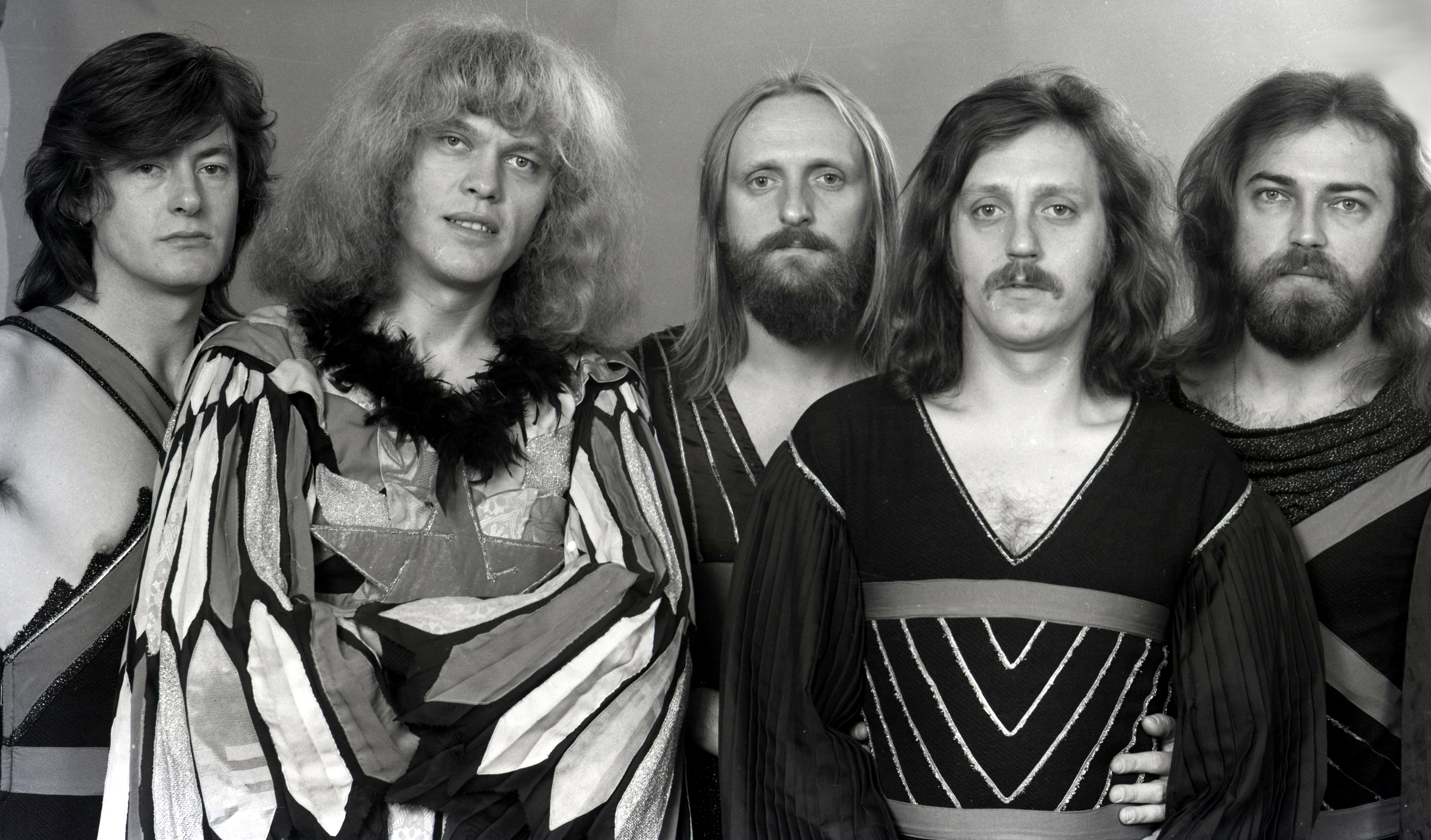
The song's outro consists of a coda that combines Ocean's pitch–altered, cooing freestyle falsetto with a sample of "Gyöngyhajú lány" by Omega (pictured).

Musically, "New Slaves" is an industrial hip hop, political rap, and gothic rock song, with elements of electro and heavy metal music. Its production is based on sparse, pulsing synths. The synths have a staccato rhythm that consists of stabs, with influences of punk rock rather than West's signature kicks and snares. The song has a minimalist melody, including a rhythmic breakdown, choral swirl, and Ken Lewis' noises and vocal sounds. It begins with a soft, dark bassline. The beginning also features a slowed sample of Dutch E Germ's "HBA War", which is interrupted by a three-note riff. For the outro, it moves into a chipmunk soul coda that lasts for a minute and 15 seconds. The coda combines pitch-altered vocals from Ocean with a sample of the 1969 single "Gyöngyhajú lány" by Hungarian band Omega. West delivers an aggressive performance, rapping in double-time and he does not deliver any hooks. Towards the end, he utilizes Auto-Tune to sing.

In the lyrics of "New Slaves", West links the wealth of different classes of black people to the counterproductive consumerism holding them back, referencing racial politics as he compares segregation to capitalism and companies controlling the citizens. He addresses the economic disparity between poor and rich African Americans, comparing the poor's racism of "Don't touch anything in the store" to the rich's "Come in, please buy more" in the first verse. The rapper blames the government and prison–industrial complex of the United States for the lack of a black middle class, accusing the Drug Enforcement Administration of working with the Corrections Corporation of America. West acknowledges the situation of leaders like himself and their followers, declaring that he would "rather be a dick than a swallower". He intones the N-word repeatedly and also mentions seeing "Blood on the Leaves", a reference to Billie Holiday's song "Strange Fruit" that is sampled on the album's track of the quote's name. West threatens prison owners living in the Hamptons of Long Island as he insults their spouses and houses towards the end, followed by Ocean delivering a freestyle falsetto that includes coos on the outro.

== Release and promotion ==
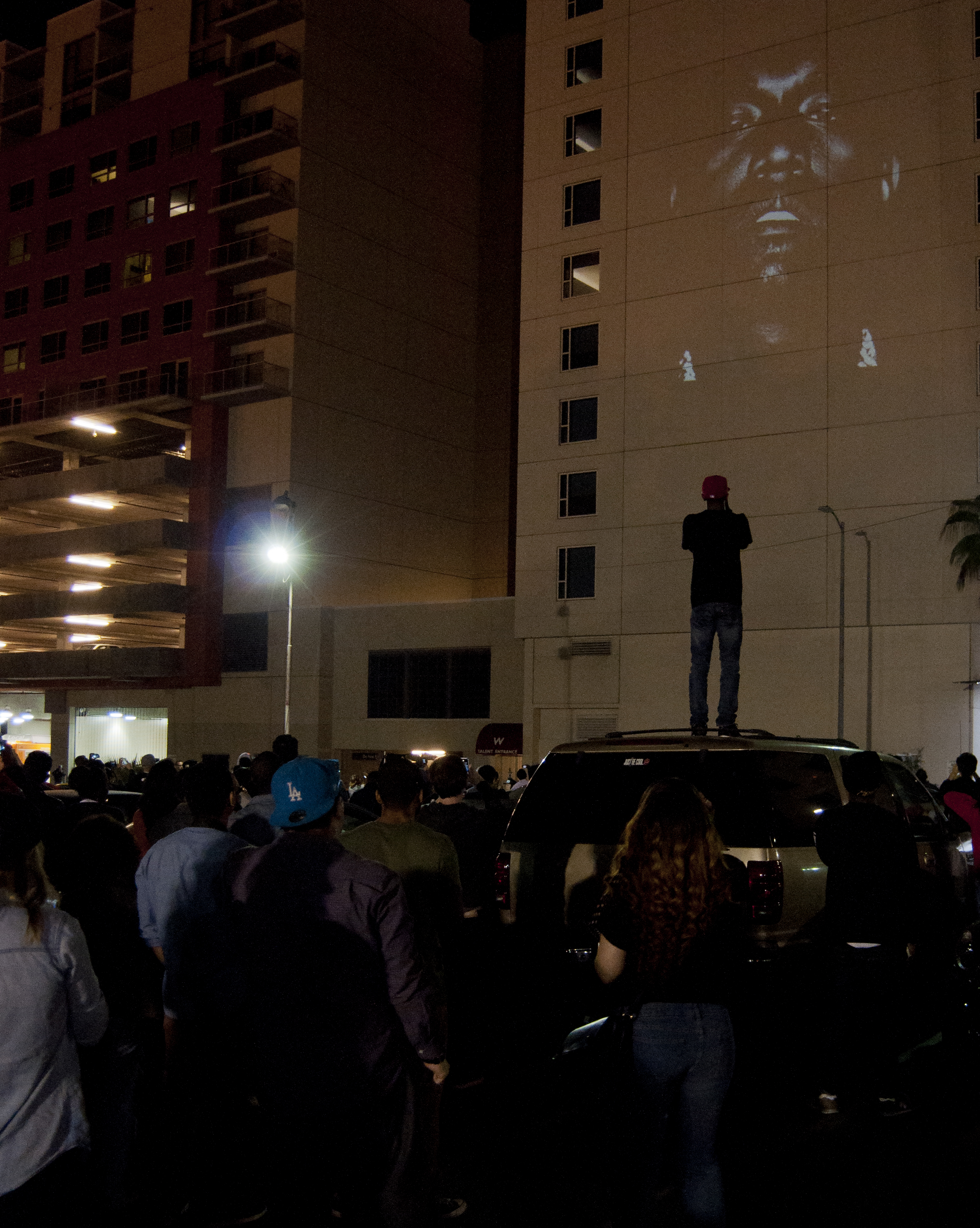
A black and white video projection of "New Slaves" on the W Hotel in Los Angeles, showing West staring past the building.

"New Slaves" was included as the fourth track on West's sixth studio album, Yeezus, released on June 18, 2013, through his labels Def Jam and Roc-A-Fella. Prior to the song's release, West unveiled it with video projections at 66 buildings across the world on May 17, 2013. West posted the locations and times of the screenings via his website, including Los Angeles, London, Paris, and Toronto. A black and white projection of West staring onwards rapping the song was shown; Miriam Coleman of Rolling Stone said that the simplicity "provided a striking context for the rapper's searing lyrics on race and materialism". The projections launched the promotion of Yeezus, concluding with its title and release date of June 18, 2013. They were also shared via YouTube and Vine. Another projection at Miami Beach, Florida was shut down by police, albeit leaving fans excited and eager to see the song's then-upcoming performance on Saturday Night Live (SNL).

West updated his website's map with 24 other locations for projections on May 24, 2013. The locations included US cities like Atlanta, Austin, and Philadelphia, in addition to European cities such as Amsterdam, Birmingham, and Milan. Three of the projections were cancelled in Houston, including one at the Rothko Chapel due to a lack of permit. West also cancelled a screening in San Antonio for the same reason. West followed the projections of "New Slaves" by projecting other songs from the album on buildings across the world in June 2013, including North America, Europe, and Oceania. On December 23, 2013, West ranted during a concert at Toronto's Air Canada Centre on The Yeezus Tour that the song was part of the representations of "the opportunities and the blessings that I had in my life". West tweeted that the song's second verse was the best rap verse of all time in July 2013, an opinion he reiterated in his interview with GQ one year later.

== Reception ==
"New Slaves" was met with widespread acclaim from music critics, with general praise for West's lyrics about racism. Robert Christgau of MSN Music cited "New Slaves" as a highlight of the album, as did The Daily Telegraph's Helen Brown. Brown said that West takes on racism "with a ferocious urgency", despite the message becoming confusing. Writing for Drowned in Sound, Kyle Ellison hailed the song as the strongest track on Yeezus with its message of "anger and self-hatred", calling out "society's culture of aspiration" from West's insider position within society. He elaborated that West demands for listens by moving towards "the brutalist, industrial arrangements", deploying the "consumer and race politics" from throughout his career. Also picking "New Slaves" as the album's best track for the Los Angeles Times, Randall Roberts lauded it as a jam with "a nuanced rhythmic breakdown" that is just as aggressive "as it is hardened". Michael Madden of Consequence saw clarity in West's concept linking blacks of different classes with consumerism, listing it as one of the "essential tracks" of Yeezus. For The Fly, Alex Denney noticed how West manages to "swipe the double-time raps of Kendrick Lamar" and take from Lex Luger's production techniques for his minimalist work, calling out the racism of those assuming blacks "want nothing more than the symbols of conspicuous consumption" while condemning the prison–industrial complex. In MusicOMH, Jordan Mainzer was taken aback by the track's discussion of the economic and class differences between different African Americans. Mainzer elaborated that West laments the lack of a middle class for the group as he characterizes a larger society as "in on preventing it from flourishing", seeing the track as a version of Killer Mike's R.A.P. Music (2012) with Ocean's stylized outro. Jamie Milton of DIY was impressed with the track not holding back on its double-meanings by perfecting a "documentation of expectations on [the classes of] black America". He thought it jumps rapidly from the abrasive verses to Ocean's cries supported by the "Gyöngyhajú lány" sample, "a eureka moment" that validates the album's almost unattainable expectations.

Several reviewers highlighted the industrial production. At The Line of Best Fit, Chris Tapley expressed that the track makes up for the album's lack of bold messages with its socially-conscious lyrics and Ocean's chipmunk soul outro. Tapley observed how the track demonstrates West's "leaner, more aggressive and militant" material, creating an ideal canvas from "caustic beats" and a stark minimalist melody. Tiny Mix Tapes's Alex Griffin praised West's ability to take on black consumerism and called the outro reminiscent of Wu-Tang Clan's "I Can't Go To Sleep" (2001), noting the piece's emotion and that West still has "more work to be done". Evan Rytlewski from The A.V. Club called the track "menacing" and praised its triumphant coda with Ocean's freestyle, although felt that the beat becomes "staticky and blown out" as its prettiness experiences distortion. Jim Farber of the New York Daily News felt that the song creates the setting for the reimagining of industrial rock on Yeezus, describing the prominent synths as recalling the sound of rap acts from the 1990s. Farber noted that the "heavy metal girth [...] still swings" and called the sampling of "Gyöngyhajú lány" the album's "most cool, and obscure, sample". For PopMatters, David Amidon viewed the track as West's attempt at Michael Jackson's 1990s singles "Scream" and "Stranger in Moscow" as he evokes his "most paranoid royalty". Amidon stated West has "the fire and brimstone of Game of Thrones' Mad King", although found Ocean's "spot to nod at James Fauntleroy" to be distracting. Exclaim's Vish Khanna declared that the song features a "pulsing, simmer-to-boil rage" as West asserts his leader status in music, yet this is frustrating for him acting "like such an asshole". Justin Hunte from HipHopDX stated that West "bumrushes impeccably" on the track, dedicated to removing "the glossy trimmings, flexing a sense of addition by subtraction". Hunte was also intrigued by how West criticizes prison owners and their spouses from the Hamptons, yet later raps about a club being packed on fellow Yeezus track "Send It Up".

Following the release of Yeezus, the track entered the US Billboard Hot 100 at number 56, lasting for two weeks. It further reached number 17 on the US Hot R&B/Hip-Hop Songs chart. In April 2015, "New Slaves" was awarded a gold certification from the Recording Industry Association of America for pushing 500,000 certified units in the US. The track also reached numbers 97 and 99 on the UK Singles Chart and Canadian Hot 100, respectively.

== Accolades ==
"New Slaves" was named to year-end lists of multiple publications in 2013. Complex and Time both ranked "New Slaves" as the best song of 2013; Dave Bry of the former publication commented that even though various artists outsold West, no one came close to being "as artistically powerful". Bry compared the song to the four bass notes of Dr. Dre and Snoop Dogg's "Deep Cover" (1992), while he found it "higher-minded [and] more ambitious" with a different audience. It was named the second best track of 2013 by Pitchfork, whose Jayson Greene highlighted the awareness of West's lyricism and called the track "the leanest and grisliest piece of music" on Yeezus. Consequence named it the third best song of the year, while the song was ranked at number four on The Village Voice's Pazz & Jop poll. "New Slaves" was listed as the eighth best song of 2013 by Paste, with Tyler Kane writing that its sparse synth-based production sets the scene for the album as West "deconstructs modern ownership and the social constructs" tying people to lives defined by consumption.

Beats Per Minute named "New Slaves" as the 60th best track of the past five years up to 2013; Brendan Frank commented that while its premiere was not smooth, the track makes the most of the album's electronic aesthetic. Frank praised West for showing his angry side, feeling he has a varied subject matter from "the effects of race on consumerism to ejaculating on trophy wives". In August 2014, "New Slaves" was ranked as the 51st best song of the 2010s decade so far by Pitchfork. Craig Jenkins of the publication depicted that West "bookended the state-of-the-disenfranchised address" of his 2004 single "Jesus Walks" as he still found closed doors to pass in his position of power, having "weaponized [his] livewire awareness" of race and wealth's crossover points. The song was nominated for Best Rap Song at the 2014 Grammy Awards, ultimately losing to "Thrift Shop" by Macklemore & Ryan Lewis featuring Wanz.

Year-end lists for "New Slaves"
Publication	Accolade	Rank	Ref.
Complex	The 50 Best Songs of 2013	1	
Consequence	Top 50 Songs of 2013	3	
Fact	The 100 Best Tracks of 2013	40	
Goûte mes disques	Top Singles of 2013	11	
Jenesaispop	Top Songs of 2013	24	
laut.de	Top Songs of 2013	6	
NME	50 Best Tracks of 2013	36	
No Ripcord	Top 40 Tracks of 2013	13	
Paste	The 50 Best Songs of 2013	8	
Pitchfork	The Top 100 Tracks of 2013	2	
Time	The 25 Best Songs of 2013	1	
The Village Voice	The Pazz & Jop Music Critics Poll 2013	4	

== Live performances ==
Prior to the album's release, West performed "New Slaves", along with "Black Skinhead", for SNL on May 18, 2013. West stood in place and looked dead-eyed into the camera as he performed with backing from a projection of eyes, while he wore an all-black outfit that included a studded leather jacket. A video screen showed a projection of a close-up of West's face and discount price tag images, including "new slaves" and "not for sale". West growled his lyrics and made them more appropriate for TV, such as changing "dick" to "prick." The rapper subsequently performed the song with the "not for sale" images at the Governors Ball Music Festival on June 9, 2013. The performance caused the ground beneath the crowd to shake and during interludes between West's verses, he paused to take breaths. West delivered an a capella performance of the song during the album's listening party in Basel on June 12, 2013. Travis Scott brought West out to perform the track at the El Rey Theatre in Los Angeles on August 1. On September 20, 2013, West performed the song for an extended episode of Later... with Jools Holland with backing vocals from his collaborator Charlie Wilson. West delivered a stripped-down, acoustic rendition based on piano keys that removed the synths.

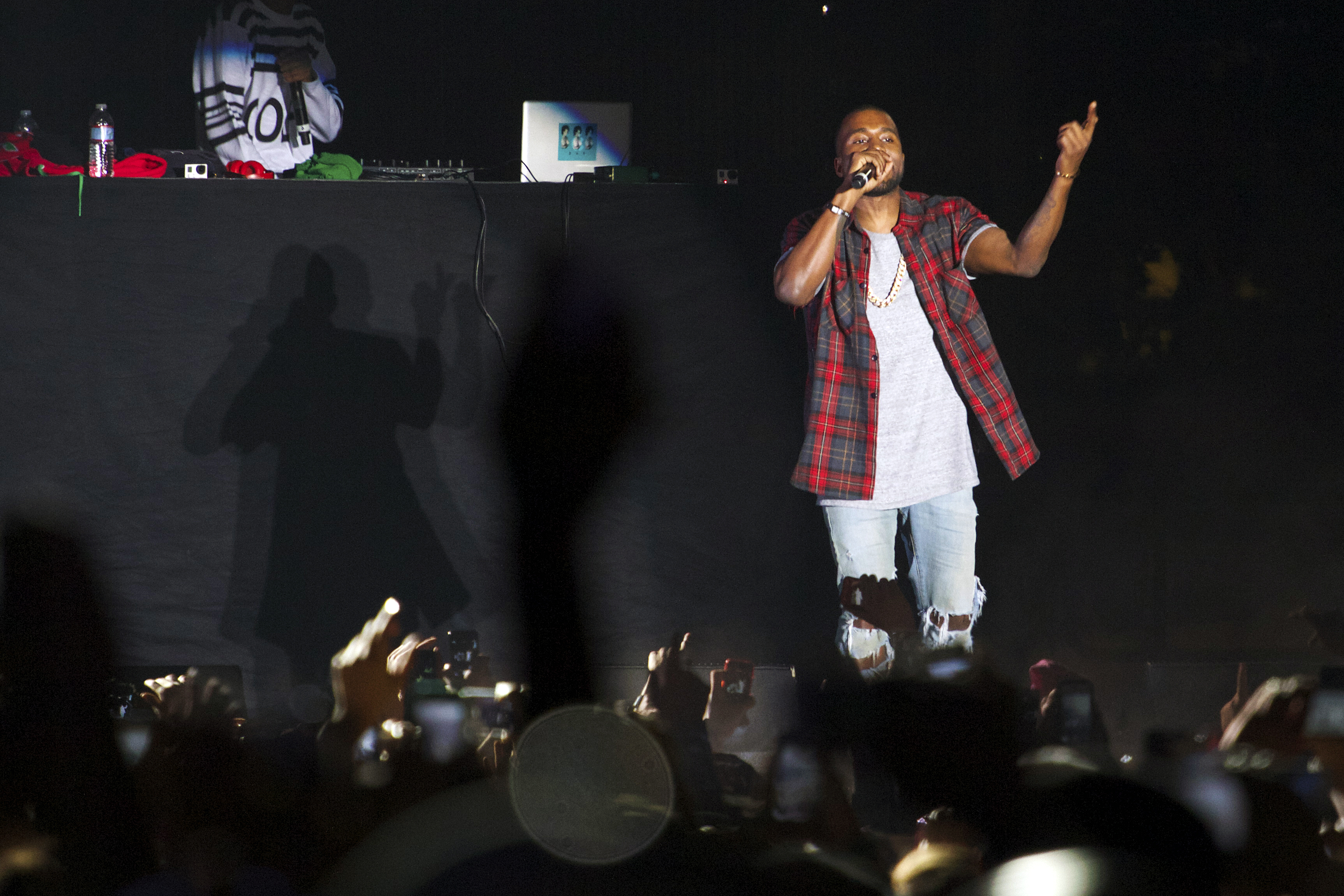
West performing "New Slaves" at Odd Future Carnival on November 9, 2013.

West incorporated five spelled-out movements into The Yeezus Tour (2013–14), beginning with the "Fighting" movement that featured him performing "New Slaves". During his tour performance at Brooklyn's Barclays Center on November 20, 2013, West kept his face away from the microphone at the beginning. The rapper was brought out by his associate Tyler, the Creator to perform the song at Odd Future Carnival on November 9, 2013, after which the two exchanged a hug. West made an unannounced appearance on Dave Chappelle's comedy show at Radio City Music Hall in Midtown Manhattan, New York City on June 20, 2014, which included a performance of the track. On April 21, 2015, West performed the song as part of a medley of tracks from throughout his career at the Time 100 gala. West delivered a medley of his 2012 single "Mercy" with "New Slaves" at the Glastonbury Festival 2015, which featured the audience shouting the track's "swallower" line.

== Lawsuit ==
On May 20, 2016, Presser launched a lawsuit against West for one third of "New Slaves", alleging that it includes an unauthorized sample of his work "Gyöngyhajú lány", which he called one of Hungary and Eastern Europe's "most beloved pop songs ever". West had previously been sued for sampling on Yeezus in 2013, with Ponderosa Twins Plus One singer Ricky Spicer citing a lack of compensation for a sample on "Bound 2". The lawsuit revealed that West was granted permission for the "New Slaves" sample on the case of a formal deal being arranged and the rapper gave Presser a $10,000 check as he insisted for a license to be granted within 24 hours, although he chose not to cash the cheque. Presser filed a complaint in the US District Court for the Southern District of New York that cited West's intentions of having "misappropriated [the] plaintiff's composition" and alleged the defendants were not willing "to deal fairly with plaintiff" once they learnt of his theft, seeking $2.5 million.

On March 20, 2017, West and Presser reached an out-of-court settlement with an undisclosed amount; he was previously set to go to trial on March 22. A report further revealed that Presser was aware of West's sample since the projections for the song prior to release, although he allowed the sample for another week before seeking an agreement. Presser said he was "very glad it is over", while his lawyer called the resolution amicable.

== Cover versions and other usage ==
On July 8, 2013, California record producer and former West associate Hit-Boy shared his re-worked version of "New Slaves" entitled "New Chains". The version adds glitchy elements, incorporating a beat switch, guitar solo, distorted vocals, and prog-rock synths, while it omits the original's outro. Lyrically, it is inspired by British slave James Somersett, who used English and Welsh law to free himself in 1772. An accompanying music video was shared that shows Hit-Boy watching old footage of chain gangs, accompanied by two impeded ladies wearing shiny swimsuits.

On July 31, 2013, rapper Angel Haze covered the song because she was "bored" and shared a free download. The cover adds new lines such as "My mother was raised in the era when/Crack rock lived in the veins of our heroines", although it keeps the original's chorus. Lil Wayne released his mixtape Dedication 5 on September 1, 2013, featuring his track "New Slaves" where he raps over the song's instrumental. West collaborator Pusha T released his debut album My Name Is My Name in October, which samples "New Slaves" on the track "King Push".

== Credits and personnel ==
Credits are adapted from the Yeezus liner notes.

Recording

- Engineering at No Name Hotel (Paris), Germano Studios (NYC) and Shangri-La (Malibu, CA)
- Assistant engineering at Studios de la Seine (Paris), Germano Studios (NYC) and Shangri-La (Malibu, CA)
- Mix and assistant mixing at Shangri-La (Malibu, CA)

Personnel

- Kanye West – songwriter, production
- Benjamin Bronfman – songwriter, co-production
- Mike Dean – songwriter, additional production, recording engineer
- Frank Ocean – songwriter, additional vocals
- Cydel Young – songwriter
- Malik Jones – songwriter
- Che Smith – songwriter
- Elon Rutberg – songwriter
- Sakiya Sandifer – songwriter
- Louis Johnson – songwriter
- Gábor Presser – songwriter
- Anna Adamis – songwriter
- Noah Goldstein – additional production, recording engineer
- Travis Scott – additional production
- Sham Joseph – additional production
- Che Pope – additional production
- Ken Lewis – noises and vocal sounds
- Hudson Mohawke – additional programming
- Arca – additional programming
- Anthony Kilhoffer – recording engineer, mix engineer
- Marc Portheau – assistant recording engineer
- Khoï Huynh – assistant recording engineer
- Raoul Le Pennec – assistant recording engineer
- Nabil Essemlani – assistant recording engineer
- Keith Parry – assistant recording engineer
- Kenta Yonesaka – assistant recording engineer
- Dave Rowland – assistant recording engineer
- Kevin Matela – assistant recording engineer
- Sean Oakley – assistant recording engineer, assistant mix engineer
- Eric Lynn – assistant recording engineer, assistant mix engineer
- Dave "Squirrel" Covell – assistant recording engineer, assistant mix engineer
- Josh Smith – assistant recording engineer, assistant mix engineer

== Charts ==
Chart performance for "New Slaves"
Chart (2013)	Peak position
Canada Hot 100 (Billboard)	99
France (SNEP)	152
UK Singles (Official Charts)	97
UK Hip Hop/R&B (Official Charts)	20
US Billboard Hot 100	56
US Hot R&B/Hip-Hop Songs (Billboard)	17

== Certifications ==
Certifications for "New Slaves"
Region	Certification	Certified units/sales
United States (RIAA)	Gold	500,000^{‡}
^{‡} Sales+streaming figures based on certification alone.
