= Palomita Blanca =

Book by Enrique Lafourcade

- Author: Enrique Lafourcade
- Language: Spanish
- Genre: Realist novel
- Publisher: Zig-Zag
- Publication date: 1971
- Publication place: Chile
- Media type: Print (Paperback)
- Pages: 186 pp

Palomita Blanca (Spanish for "Little White Dove") is a 1971 novel written by Enrique Lafourcade. More than fifty editions (including "reprintings") have been published, making the novel the most widely sold novel in the history of Chilean literature, with more than a million copies sold. It was written at a conflictive time in Chile's history (events leading into the election of Salvador Allende as President) and it was a sentimental time in world popular culture (events such as rock concerts and drug use). Most critics saw the novel as a knee-jerk response to Erich Segal's Love Story. A New York Times No. 1 bestseller, Segal's book became the top selling work of fiction for all of 1970 in the United States, and was translated into more than 20 languages worldwide. The motion picture of the same name was the number one box office attraction of 1971. Thus most media comments in Santiago called Lafourcade's novel "the Chilean love story." Lafourcade's marriage with Maria Luisa Señoret had ended three years earlier, and he reportedly wrote the novel inspired by his later pareja, about whom he remained quite secretive. A film based on the novel was made in 1973 by Raúl Ruiz, which was at one time believed lost forever, but a print was later found in the vaults of ChileFilms. Music for the film was written and performed by Los Jaivas. A translation to Portuguese was published in Brazil, but a translation to English by Joel Hancock of the University of Utah has remained unpublished.

The story is of a working class naive teenage girl (María = Palomita) who meets a posh boy (Juan Carlos) in the Piedra Roja music festival. The love story goes wrong because of the class differences between the characters, and the naiveté of the girl who believes in the Cinderella story of a poor girl rescued by a rich and handsome prince. Juan Carlos is involved in extreme right-wing terrorism, and needs to leave the country in a hurry, leaving Palomita behind. The political tension that would later culminate in the 1973 Chilean coup d'état is brilliantly observed and described by writer Lafourcade.

== Film adaptation ==
The novel was adapted into the 1973 film Little White Dove by Chilean director Raúl Ruiz.

== Music ==
It is also the name of a popular tango from 1929 by Anselmo Aieto.

== Editions ==
First: June, 1971, published by Zig-Zag (Santiago de Chile): 5,000 copies. 2nd: July, 1971: 3,000 copies. 3rd: August, 1971: 5,000 copies. 4th: September, 1971: 5,000 5th: October, 1971: 5,000 6th: October, 1971: 8,000 7th: November, 1971: 10,000 8th: December, 1971: 5,000 9th: January, 1972: 5,000 10th: March, 1972: 5,000 11th: May, 1972: 10,000 12th: September 1972: 10,000 13th: April, 1973: 10,000

In 1982: The publication changed to Lafourcade's own in-house publisher: —Ediciones de Lafourcade, Santiago de Chile.

1984: —First special edition: Colección "Los Grandes de la Literatura Chilena", Editorial Zig-Zag. —17th edition, Editorial Zig-Zag.

1986: —18th edition, Editorial Zig-Zag.

1987: —19th edition, Editorial Zig-Zag.

1992: —24th edition, Editorial Zig-Zag.

1994: —27th edition, Editorial Zig-Zag. —28th edition, Colección "Top Sellers", Editorial Zig-Zag. —29th edition, Colección "Viento Joven" / Youthful breeze, Editorial Zig-Zag. —Special Edition on the occasion of the showing the film made decades earlier by Raúl Ruiz: Ediciones del Paraíso Perdido.

1995: —30th edition, Editorial Zig-Zag.

1996: —31st edition, Editorial Zig-Zag. —32nd edition, Editorial Zig-Zag.

1997: —Special Edition: Colección "Los mejores Libros de la Literatura Chilena", Ercilla, Santiago de Chile.

1999: —33rd edition, Editorial Zig-Zag.
