= Enrique Lafourcade =

Chilean writer and journalist (1927–2019)

- Born: Enrique Eduardo Lafourcade Valdenegro; October 14, 1927
- Died: July 29, 2019 (aged 91)
- Occupations: Writer, journalist
- Spouse: Marta Blanco

Enrique Eduardo Lafourcade Valdenegro (14 October 1927 – 29 July 2019) was a Chilean writer, critic and journalist from Santiago.

== Biography ==
Lafourcade was a member of the so-called "Generation of the '50s", a term suggested by Lafourcade himself in 1954 to describe authors born between 1920 and 1934 who began to flourish in the 1950s, writers who departed in content and style from the previous regional style known as "Criollismo"; and more widely within the "boom generation" in Latin America, also known as Latin American Boom, a generation of writers who produced an explosion of works in the mid-20th century and decades that followed, which included five Nobel Prize winners: Miguel Ángel Asturias (Guatemala) in 1967, Pablo Neruda (Chile) in 1971, Gabriel García Márquez (Colombia) in 1982, Octavio Paz (Mexico) in 1990, and Mario Vargas Llosa (Peru) in 2010, and several other influential intellectual authors such as Jorge Luis Borges and Julio Cortázar in Argentina.

== Writing ==
Lafourcade published at least 24 novels (over 30 by some accounts) and over a dozen anthologies and collections of short stories and essays. His novel Palomita Blanca (1971) sold over a million copies, making it one of the all-time bestsellers in Chile. It was translated into several languages and brought to the screen by Chilean-French director Raúl Ruiz. Lafourcade's latest novel, El Inesperado (2004), imagines the life of French poet Arthur Rimbaud in Africa, and though a work of fiction, it is inspired by the letters of the poet and three years of additional research. The novel was launched on 20 October 2004, on the 150th anniversary of Rimbaud's birth.

Other titles include (not an exhaustive list):

- Pena de Muerte (1952)
- Para Subir al Cielo (1959)
- la Fiesta del Rey Acab (1959)
- El principe y las Ovejas (1961)
- Invencion a Dos Voces (1963)
- Novela de Navidad (1965)
- Pronombres Personales (1967)
- Frecuencia Modulada (1968)
- En el Fondo (1973)
- Salvador Allende (1973)
- Variaciones sobre el tema de Nastasia Filippovna y el Principe Mishkin (1974)
- Tres Terroristas (1977)
- Buddha y los Chocolates Envenenados (1977)
- Adios al Führer (1982)
- El Gran Taimado (1984)
- Los Hijos del Arco Iris (1985)
- Las Senales van Hacia el Sur (1988)
- Pepita de Oro (1989)
- Hoy Esta Solo mi Corazon (1990)
- Mano Bendita (1993)
- Cristianas Viejas y Limpias (1997)

Lafourcade received various literary awards in his country, such as the prestigious Municipal Prize, the Gabriela Mistral Prize and the Maria Luisa Bombal Prize, awarded to the best novel of the year.

== Journalism ==
Self-described as "a sentimental anarchist and catholic in a state of wilderness", Lafourcade was best known as a journalist and critic. For years he wrote an editorial for the newspaper El Mercurio (the largest in the country), focusing on literature but with incursions into politics, cultural issues and subjects of impact upon the nation. Some of his most critical articles, written in an often mordant style, as well as various public discourses, angered dictators and politicians in Chile and other Latin American countries and resulted in tension with the authorities, including an episode where his bookstore was stormed by force and all the remaining copies of his book El Taimado (The Stubborn Man, a satire of the Chilean dictator Augusto Pinochet, then still in power) were withdrawn.

He appeared in numerous television programs, both as guest and as part of recurring panels of cultural critics. His ironic and often sarcastic style as well as his impudent way of offering opinions on just about everything and everybody produced more than one commotion in the country, making "Lafourcade" a household name in Chile. Numerous anecdotes surround his name, including engaging in a fist fight with another journalist during a live television program. For some time he wrote a gastronomic review under the name of "Conde de Lafourchette" ("fourchette" meaning "fork" in French) in El Mercurio, in which he gave his uncensored opinion about restaurants and their food. Allegedly, he was feared by restaurant owners across the country, and waiters were instructed to call upon the owner or general manager as soon as they saw Lafourcade walking in. In 1997 he published the book La cocina erótica del conde Lafourchette (The Erotic Cuisine of Count Lafourchette).

He publicly declared himself an "unrelenting enemy of ignorance and incompetence". He was believed to have as many enemies as he had friends, to the point that for years rumors circulated of a group of people gathering signatures to "expel Lafourcade from Chile".

== Personal life ==
According to public records, Lafourcade was married three times: 1953–1978 to Chilean-born Canadian artist Maria Luisa Segnoret; 1978–2008 to Chilean writer and journalist Marcela Godoy Divin; and 2009–2019 to Chilean painter Rossana Pizarro Garcia, with whom he reportedly lived for nearly 20 years. He also had a long relationship with Chilean writer and journalist Marta Blanco, with whom he lived for seven years; they were assumed to be married. He was the father of three children, Dominique (1954), Octavio (1955-2019), and Nicole (1974).

Lafourcade’s family has continued the legacy of writers and musicians. His son Octavio was a classical musician (lute and guitar), member of the ancient Spanish music group Capella de Ministrers. His daughter Nicole is a poet and literary translator, and member of Café Literarte. His brother Gaston Lafourcade is a musician (harpsichord) and instructor at the Universidad Nacional Autónoma de México; his niece, Natalia Lafourcade (Gaston's daughter), born in Mexico, has become a well-known singer, composer and rock pop star, recipient of Grammy Awards; and his granddaughter, Colomba Braña Lafourcade, is a Chilean-American singer, composer and environmental activist under the name of ColombaLá.

== Additional sources ==
- "Memoria Chilena: Portal de la Cultura de Chile"
- Archives of El Mercurio (paper form)
- Letralia
- Escritores y Poetas en Español (Archived version: Letras)
