= Kóbor János =

Hungarian singer (1943–2021)

János Kóbor
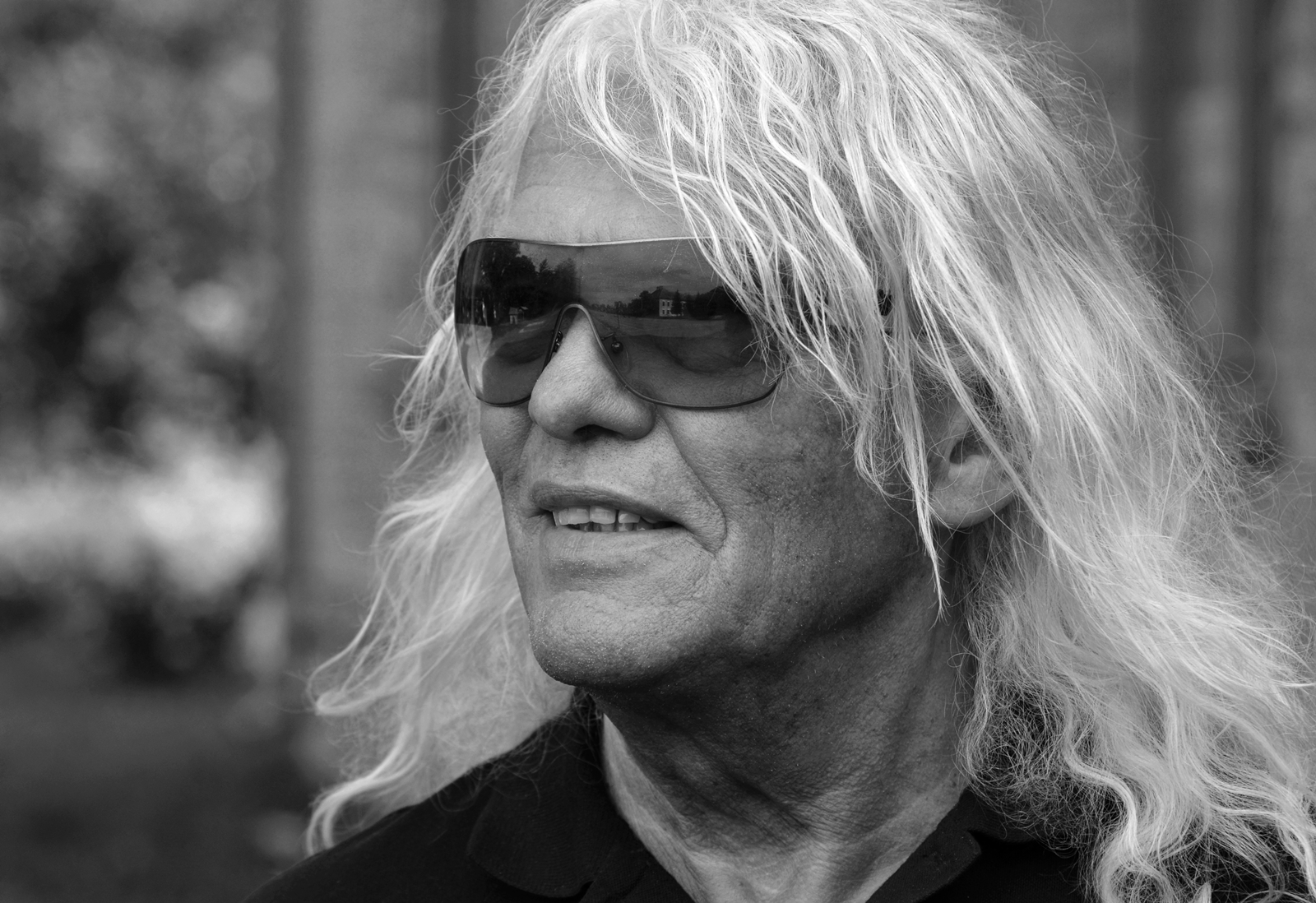
- Kóbor in 2018

Background information
- Also known as: Mecky
- Born: 17 May 1943; Budapest, Hungary
- Died: 6 December 2021 (aged 78) Budapest, Hungary
- Genres: Rock; progressive rock; hard rock
- Occupations: Singer; musician
- Years active: 1959–2021
- Formerly of: Omega

János Kóbor (17 May 1943 – 6 December 2021) was a Hungarian singer. Nicknamed "Mecky," he is best known as the frontman of the rock band Omega. He received both the Kossuth and Liszt Ferenc Awards for his contributions to Hungarian music. He died of COVID-19 on 6 December 2021, at the age of 78.

== Discography ==
Omega
Year	Album	Notes
1968	Trombitás Frédi és a rettenetes emberek	
1969	10000 lépés	
1970	Éjszakai országút	
1972	Élő Omega	Live album
1973	Omega 5	
1975	Omega 6: Nem tudom a neved	
1977	Omega 7: Időrabló	
1978	Omega 8: Csillagok útján	
1979	Gammapolis	
1981	Omega X: Az arc	
1982	Omega XI	
1986	Omega 12: A Föld árnyékos oldalán	
1987	Babylon	
1995	Trans and Dance	
1998	Omega XV: Egy életre szól	
2006	Égi jel: Omega	
2020	Testamentum	
Classical Adaptations
2010	Omega Rhapsody	
2012	Omega Szimfónia & Rapszódia	
2014	Omega Oratórium	
