= Keistuolių Teatras =

Lithuanian theatre troupe

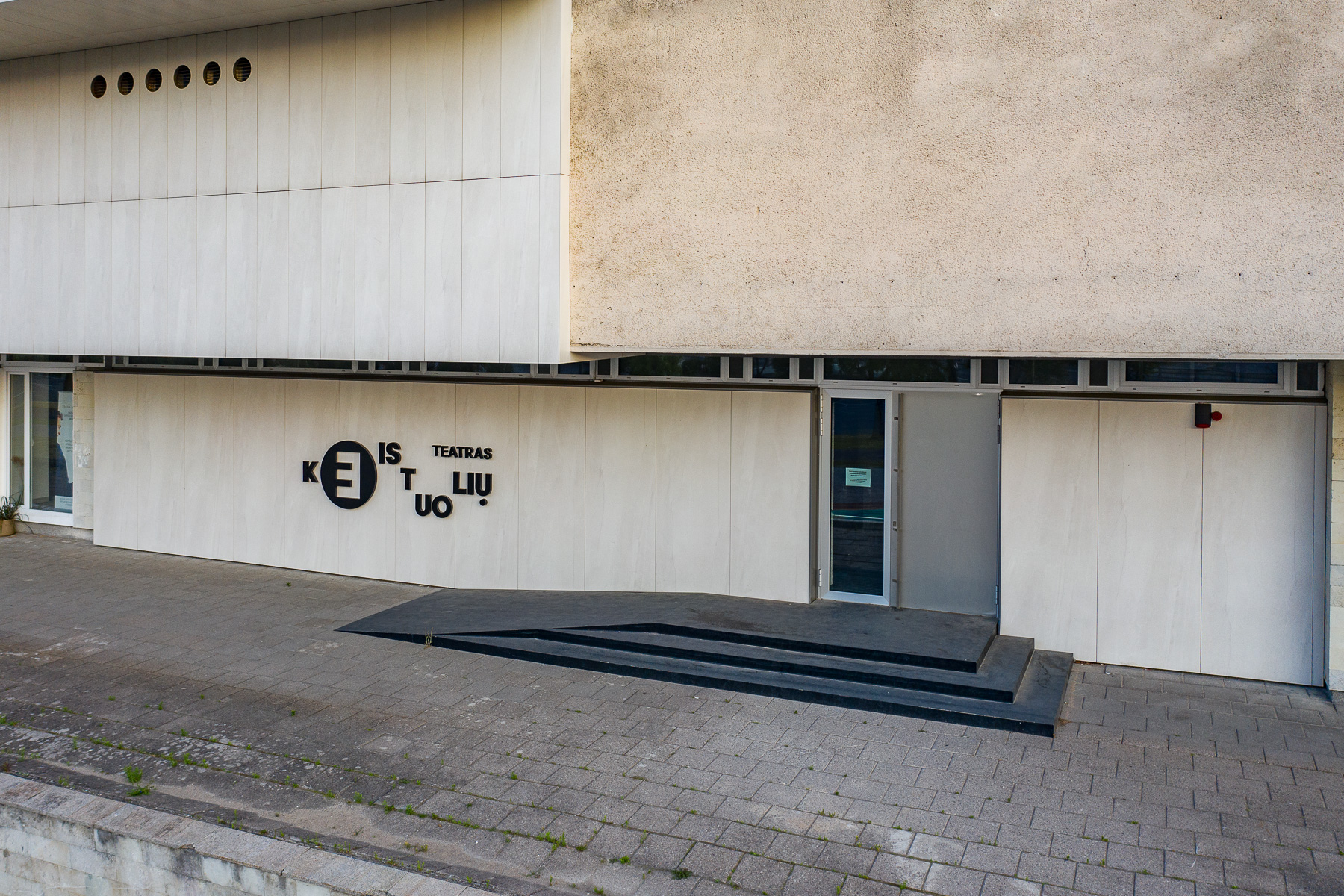
2023

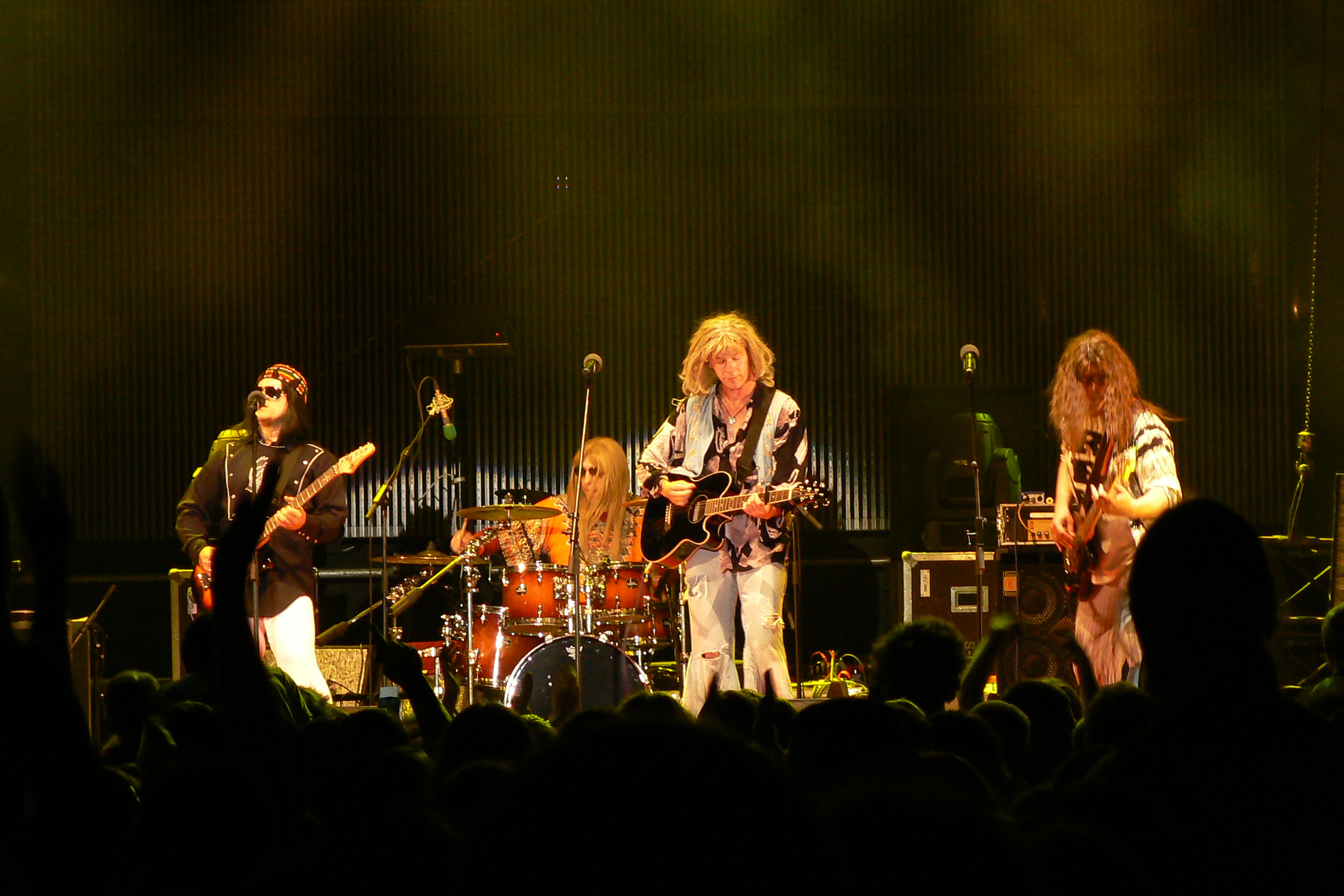
2008

Keistuolių Teatras ("Weirdos' Theatre", "Theatre of Eccentric Men") is a Lithuanian theatre troupe. It was founded in 1989 by actors Ilona Balsytė, Aidas Giniotis and Sigutis Jačėnas and theatre director Romualdas Vikšraitis. The theatre produces plays and music for general public and children.

In 1999 the theatre became a member of ASSITEJ.

In 20 years (1989–2009) the theatre released 50 plays, 8 videofilms, 11 audiocassettes and 10 CDs.

In 2004 it was entered into the Book of Lithuanian Records ("Lietuvos rekordų knyga") as the longest time acting private theatre and the theatre with most performances in a year (217).
