= Hungaroton =

Hungarian record and music publisher

- Founded: 1951
- Country of origin: Hungary
- Location: Budapest
- Official website: hungarotonmusic.com

Hungaroton is the oldest record label and music publishing company in Hungary.

Hungaroton was founded in 1951, when its only competitors in the Hungarian music market were record labels like Melodiya, Supraphon and Eterna from other socialist countries. Previously called Qualiton Records, its name was changed to Hungaroton in the mid-1960s, though the Qualiton brand remained as a label for operetta and gypsy music releases. Also new popular music, rock and jazz labels (Pepita, Bravó, and Krém) were founded.

In the early 1990s the massive import of foreign records caused a serious decrease in Hungaroton's sales. Although the original company went into liquidation, new and smaller companies arose on the ruins of Hungaroton. The Hungaroton Gong and Hungaroton Classic companies went private in 1995, and were reunited in 1998 under the name Hungaroton Records Publisher Ltd.

Nowadays it publishes approximately 150 new records per year, half of it classical and half of it popular music.

== See also ==
- Lists of record labels
