= Qualiton Records =

Name of several record labels

Qualiton is a frequently used record-label name in different countries. There have been and there still are several labels known as Qualiton, in particular the Hungarian state-owned corporation during the post-World War II years in Europe. The company changed its name to Hungaroton in the mid-1960s, but the Qualiton label remained for gypsy music and operetta repertoire. Other records labels bought the Qualiton license from Hungaroton and eventually became their own labels. Discos Qualiton and Qualiton South Wales are examples of the latter.

== Qualiton, South Wales ==
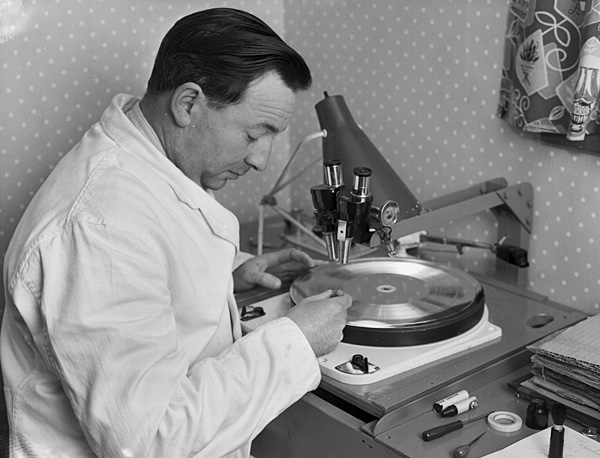
Qualiton Records, Pontardawe

Qualiton Records was a small record label which produced shellac and vinyl records in the 1950s until at least 1963 at Pontardawe, in the Swansea Valley in South Wales. It was subsequently purchased by Decca and renamed Qualiton Records (1968) Ltd, and the losses associated with the company used by Decca for tax reasons.

== Discos Qualiton, Argentina ==
Discos Qualiton was an independent record label own by Fonema S.A. in Buenos Aires, Argentina.

== See also ==
- List of record labels
- Hungaroton
