= Girls Like Nicole =

Studio album by Rebstar
- Released: June 3, 2016
- Genre: Hip hop, pop
- Length: 27:00
- Label: Today Is Vintage
- Producer: Madison, DJ Pain 1, Markus Harju, Paul Hanna, ALIBY

Rebstar chronology
You Know Nothing About Love (2015)	Girls Like Nicole (2016)	dont stress Me (2017)

Girls Like Nicole is the debut album by Swedish recording artist Rebstar. It was released on June 3, 2016 by Today Is Vintage. The album contains elements of hip hop, psychedelic pop and indie rock.

== Track listing ==
No.	Title	Producer(s)	Length
1.	"American Beauty"	DJ Pain 1	3:34
2.	"(last night i met a new girl)"	Uncredited Sample	0:31
3.	"Who Knows"	Madison	3:14
4.	"(last night i met a new girl)"	Uncredited Sample	0:19
5.	"Get No Better" (featuring Vivi)	Madison	3:20
6.	"Do You Still Want Me?"	Madison	2:43
7.	"(you prolly think this song is about you)"	Uncredited Sample	0:18
8.	"Thing About You"	DJ Pain 1	3:55
9.	"Mercedes^"	Markus Harju	1:18
10.	"Take Me Out" (featuring Paul Hanna)	DJ Pain 1, Paul Hanna	0:18
11.	"Nicole"	ALIBY	2:47

== Personnel ==
- Executive produced by Rebstar
- Photography: Linus Morales, Eric Dahlerus
- Artwork direction by Rebstar
- Artwork design by Eric Dahlerus
- Engineered by Rebstar, Saint
- Mixed by Markus Harju
- Mastered by Björn Engelmann for Cutting Room
