= Dont stress Me =

dont stress Me

Studio album by Rebstar
- Released: September 29, 2017
- Genre: Hip hop, pop
- Length: 37:00
- Label: Today Is Vintage
- Producer: DJ Pain 1, Vintage Madison, RuzBeatz, Rebstar, Nino's Experience, Guy Joyner

Rebstar chronology
Girls Like Nicole (2016)	dont stress Me (2017)

Dont stress me stylized as (dont stress Me) is the second album by Swedish rapper Rebstar. It was released on September 29, 2017 by Today Is Vintage. The album contains elements of rap, R&B, funk and pop.

== Track listing ==
No.	Title	Producer(s)	Length
1.	"Almost Forgot"	DJ Pain 1	2:24
2.	"Thriller"	DJ Pain 1	3:10
3.	"Bella" (featuring Naked People)	DJ Pain 1	2:14
4.	"dont stress Me"	DJ Pain 1	3:22
5.	"Hahaha"	DJ Pain 1	3:13
6.	"Alright Alright Alright Alright" (featuring Baby Mike)	DJ Pain 1	3:51
7.	"365"	DJ Pain 1, Rebstar, RuzBeatz	3:10
8.	"Hello Kitty" (featuring LE SINNER)	DJ Pain 1	3:10
9.	"Haii"	Nino's Experience, Guy Joyner	2:58
10.	"Vakna idiot"	Vintage Madison, Rebstar	0:49
11.	"Wake Me Up" (featuring Nino's Experience)	Vintage Madison	3:40
12.	"GoodForYou"	Vintage Madison	2:48
13.	"My Little Sister"	DJ Pain 1	3:00
Total length:			37:00

== Personnel ==
- Executive produced by Rebstar, DJ Pain 1
- Photography: LE SINNER
- Artwork direction by Rebstar, pvtso
- Artwork design by pvtso
- Engineered by Rebstar, LE SINNER, Naked People, Baby Mike
- Mixed by Guy Joyner, DJ Pain 1, Rebstar, Vintage Madison, LE SINNER
- Mastered by Guy Joyner for Sine-Post Audio
