= Herrgården =

- Neighbourhood
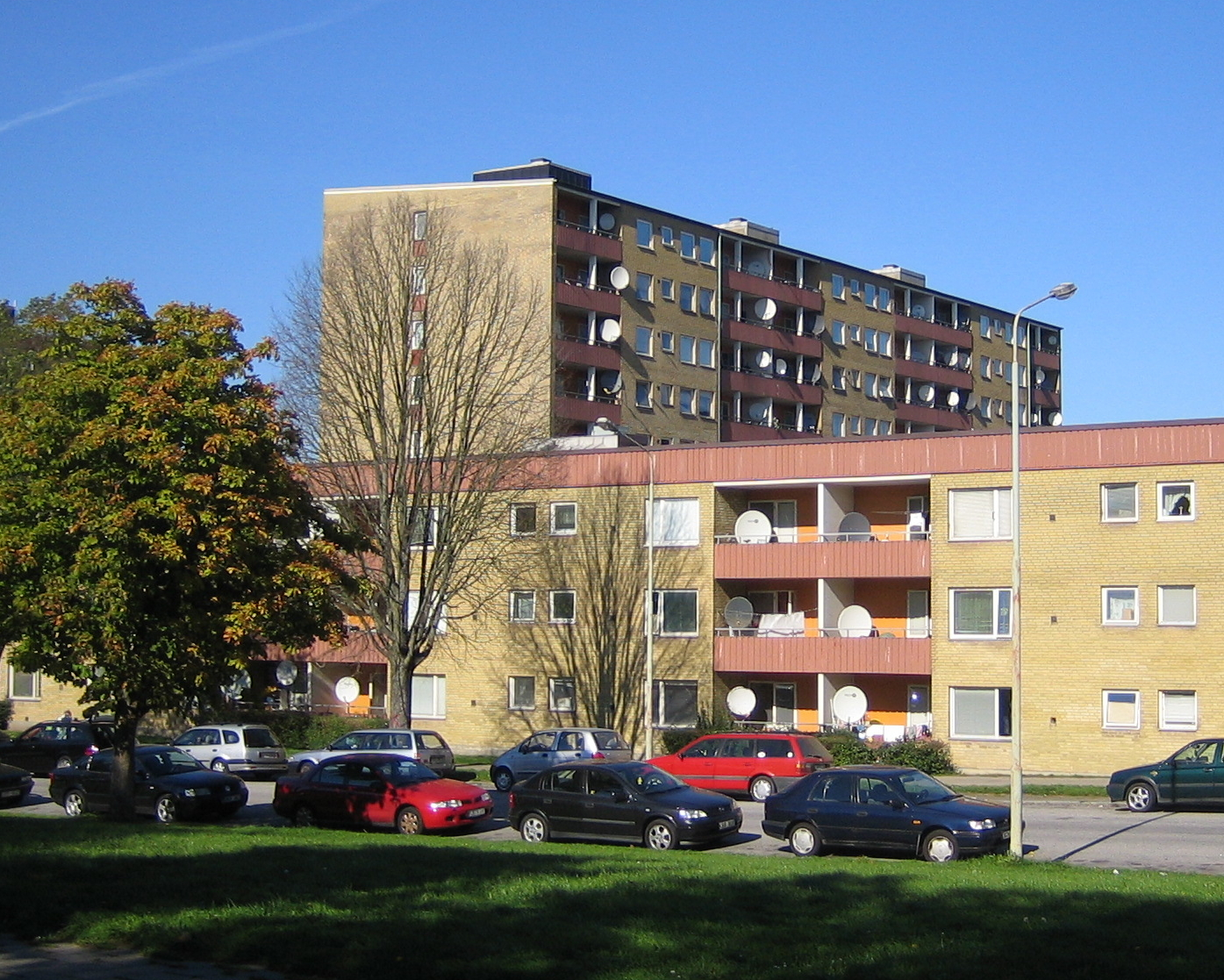
- Interactive map of Herrgården
- Coordinates: 55°34′53″N 13°03′02″E
- Country: Sweden
- Province: Skåne
- County: Skåne County
- Municipality: Malmö Municipality
- Borough of Malmö: Rosengård

Population (1 January 2011)
  - Total: 4,660
- Time zone: UTC+1 (CET)
  - Summer (DST): UTC+2 (CEST)

Herrgården is a neighbourhood of Malmö, situated in the district of Öster, Malmö Municipality, Skåne County, Sweden.

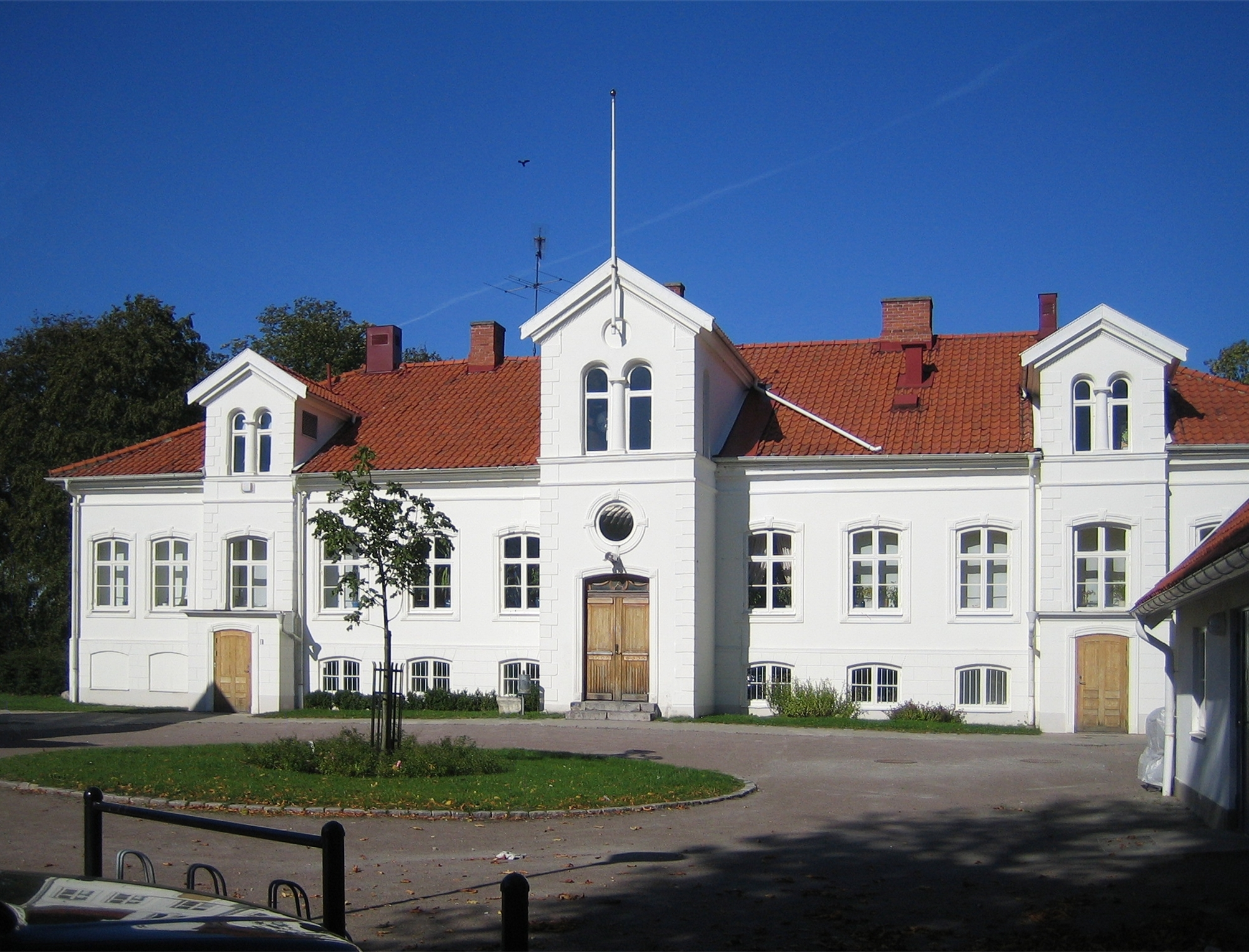
The mansion house.

== History ==
A mansion ("herrgård") from 1817 is located in the area. The Kockums family owned it from 1848 to some years after 1959, when the last owner (who had no children) died. It was leased for some years, then sold to a company and later became the city's property. One more floor was added in 1870. Since 1990, the building has been used by a culture association for young people.

== Contemporary era ==
Generally considered the part of Rosengård with the highest rate of social problems, 96% of the neighborhood's population is of foreign background (67% born abroad and 29% born in Sweden to two immigrant parents). 47% of the population is 18 years and younger. The most common countries of origin include Iraq, Lebanon, Afghanistan, Yugoslavia and Somalia. Just 15% of the population is employed. In the 2011-13 period, 58% of the population originated outside the EU and the Nordic countries.

Herrgården is a social-democratic stronghold, with the Swedish Social Democratic Party garnering 82% of votes in the 2006 elections.

In 2015 public security cameras were installed by Police in Sweden due to high crime rates in the area.
