= Zlatan Court =

Football field in Sweden

Coordinates: 55°35′18″N 13°1′55″E

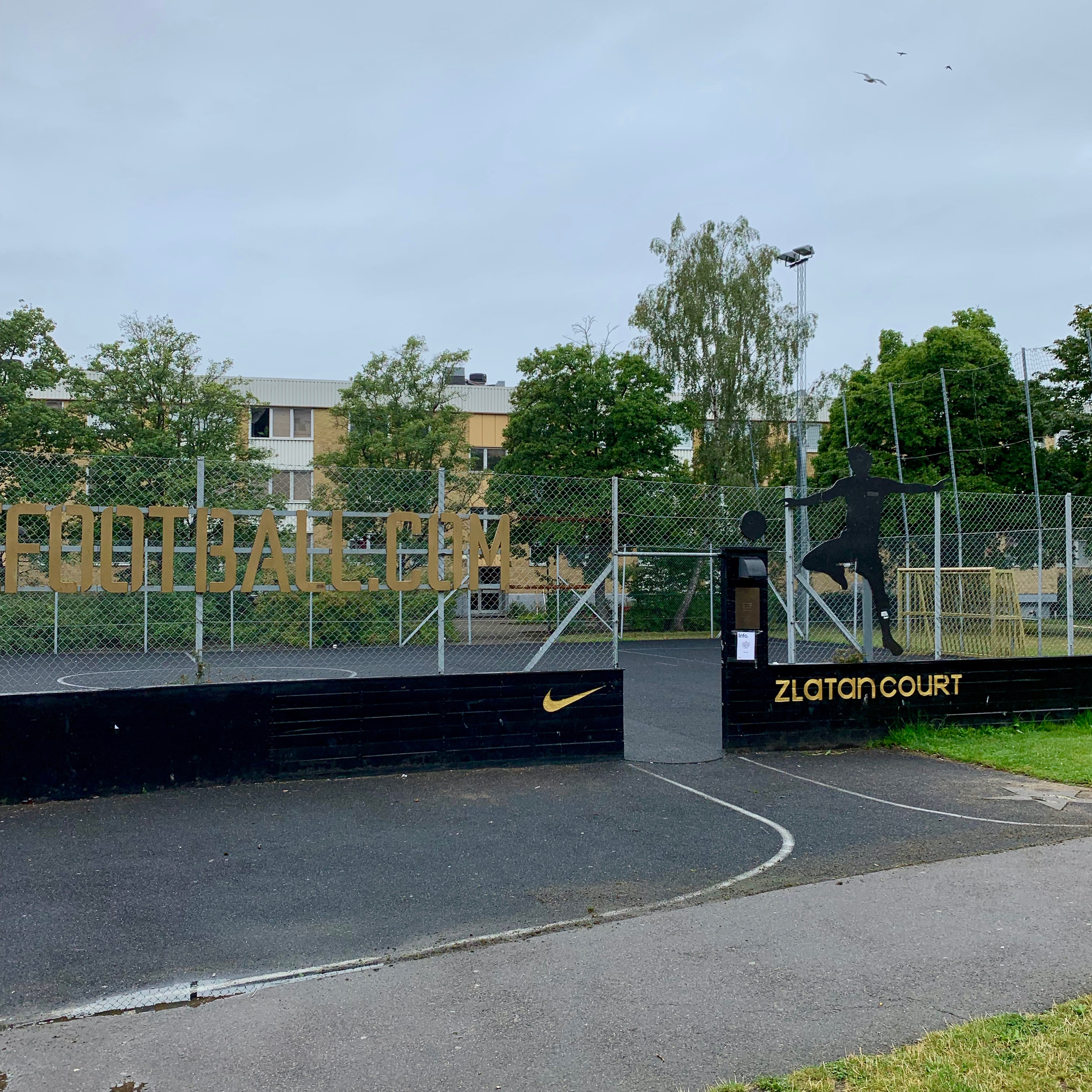
Zlatan Court entrance in Malmö

Zlatan Court is a football field in the city district of Rosengård in Malmö in southern Sweden, dedicated to the footballer Zlatan Ibrahimović.

The football field was inaugurated 8 October 2007 by Zlatan Ibrahimović and lies in the courtyard of the Cronmans väg, where Zlatan used to play football during his childhood. The football field is of the type five-a-side and the pitch is made up of recycled athletic shoes. The field is illuminated during dark hours. Besides the football field itself, Zlatan Court also has a unique wooden ball fence.

The entrance to Zlatan Court has the inscription: "Here is my heart. Here is my history. Here is my game. Take it further. Zlatan." (Swedish: Här finns mitt hjärta. Här finns min historia. Här finns mitt spel. Ta det vidare. Zlatan.). Ibrahimović's footprint and his autograph have been immortalised as a star-shaped impression to the ground at the pitch. The midfield of the pitch is decorated by Ibrahimović's golden silhouette.

The structure was erected as a cooperation by the municipal property management company MKB Fastighets AB, the athletics shoe producer Nike and Zlatan Ibrahimović.

The concept and the design was developed by Elzbieta von Semkov and Christian Persia from the Design and Architecture studio, StudioPersia https://studiopersia.com/about
