= Rosengård =

- Former city district
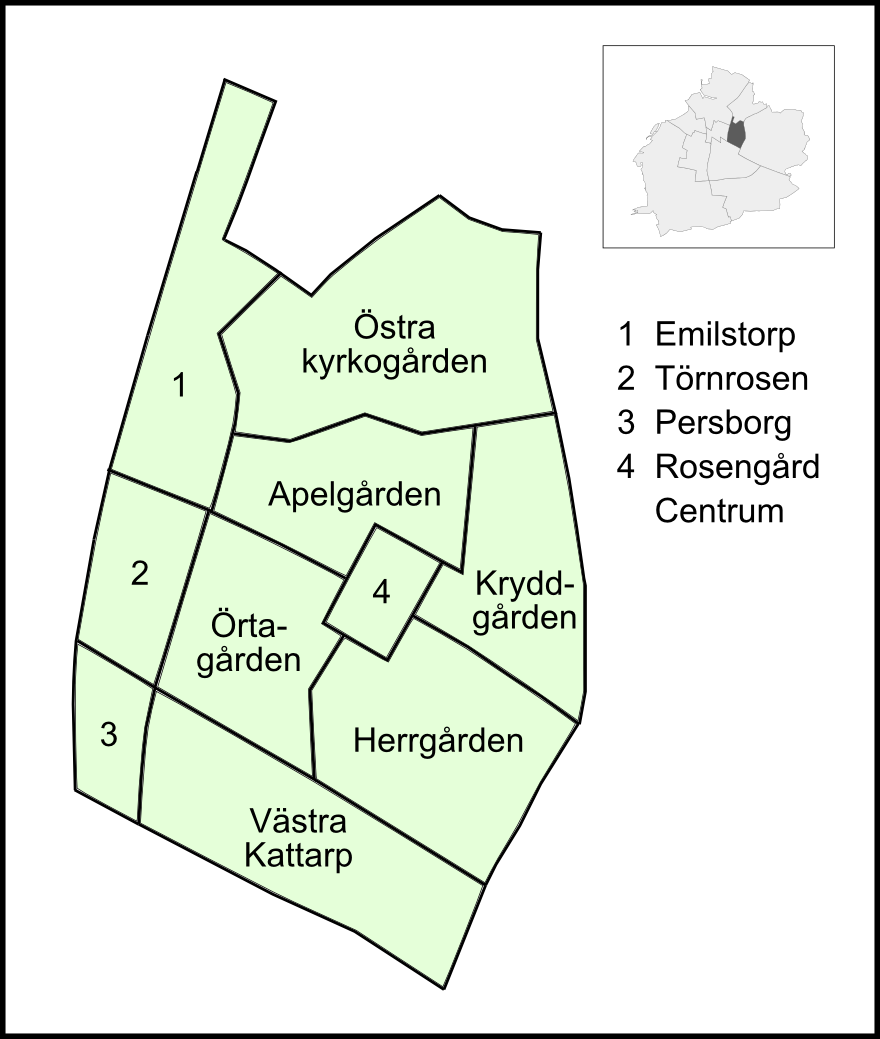
- Rosengård's neighbourhoods
- Country: Sweden
- Province: Scania
- County: Skåne County
- Municipality: Malmö Municipality

Area
  - Total: 332 ha (820 acres)

Population (2012)
  - Total: 23,563
  - Density: 7,100/km^{2} (18,400/sq mi)
- Time zone: UTC+01:00 (CET)
  - Summer (DST): UTC+02:00 (CEST)

Rosengård (literally "Rose Manor") was a city district (Swedish: stadsdel) in the centre of Malmö Municipality, Sweden. On 1 July 2013, it was merged with Husie, forming Öster. In 2012, Rosengård had a population of 23,563 of the municipality's 307,758. Its area was 332 hectares.

Rosengård was located centrally in Malmö, neighbouring the former city district Centrum. Long a destination for immigrants, 86% of the population had some foreign ancestry in 2008. Since 2015, it has been categorised by the Swedish Police Authority as a "particularly vulnerable area" (särskilt utsatta områden) due to pervasive violence and criminal activity.

== History ==
Most of Rosengård was built between 1967 and 1972 as a part of the Million Programme although some parts, such as the mansion in Herrgården, and Östra kyrkogården, are older. Rosengård was to a high degree populated by minorities. In 1972, about 18% of residents were foreign-born; by 1994, this figure was 67% in the Southern district. By 2012, 86% of residents were immigrants or children of immigrants.

In July 2013, Rosengård was merged with Husie, forming Öster.

=== Violence ===
Rosengård has been the location of violent clashes between gangs and between younger residents and authorities.

In December 2008, riots occurred wherein many individuals confronted the police, setting ablaze a number of cars and other property. The event was preceded by the eviction of a local mosque, and the riot ended following the deployment of police from Gothenburg and Stockholm.

In June 2011, shots were fired at the lower floor of the police station in Rosengård.

== In film ==
The Netflix drama series based on the writings of Henning Mankell about fictional Inspector Kurt Wallander, Young Wallander, features Rosengård heavily in the series as the main focus of the story line. Sara Ringmar, a left-leaning columnist, criticised the series for allegedly peddling negative stereotypes about the city, and noted that most of the scenes were filmed in Lithuania.

== Neighbourhoods ==
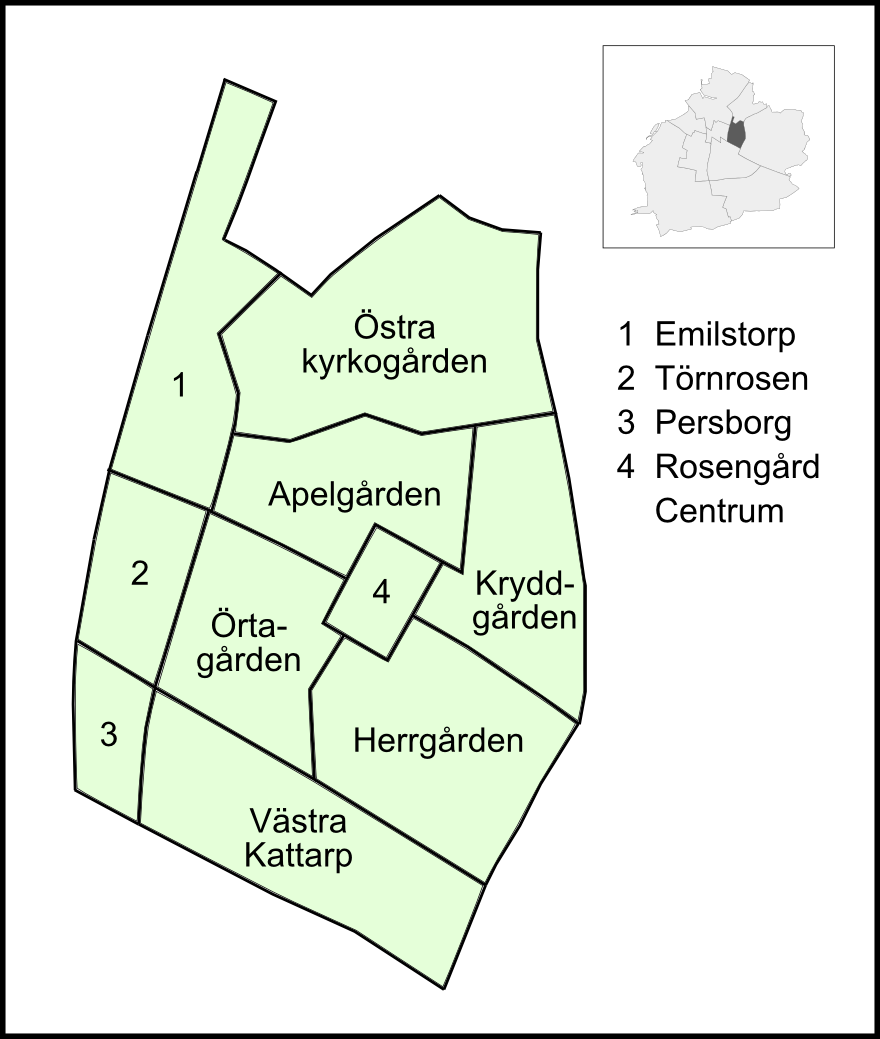
Neighbourhoods before July 2013.

The neighbourhoods of Rosengård were:

- Apelgården
- Emilstorp
- Herrgården
- Kryddgården
- Persborg
- Rosengård Centrum
- Törnrosen
- Västra Kattarp
- Örtagården
- Östra kyrkogården
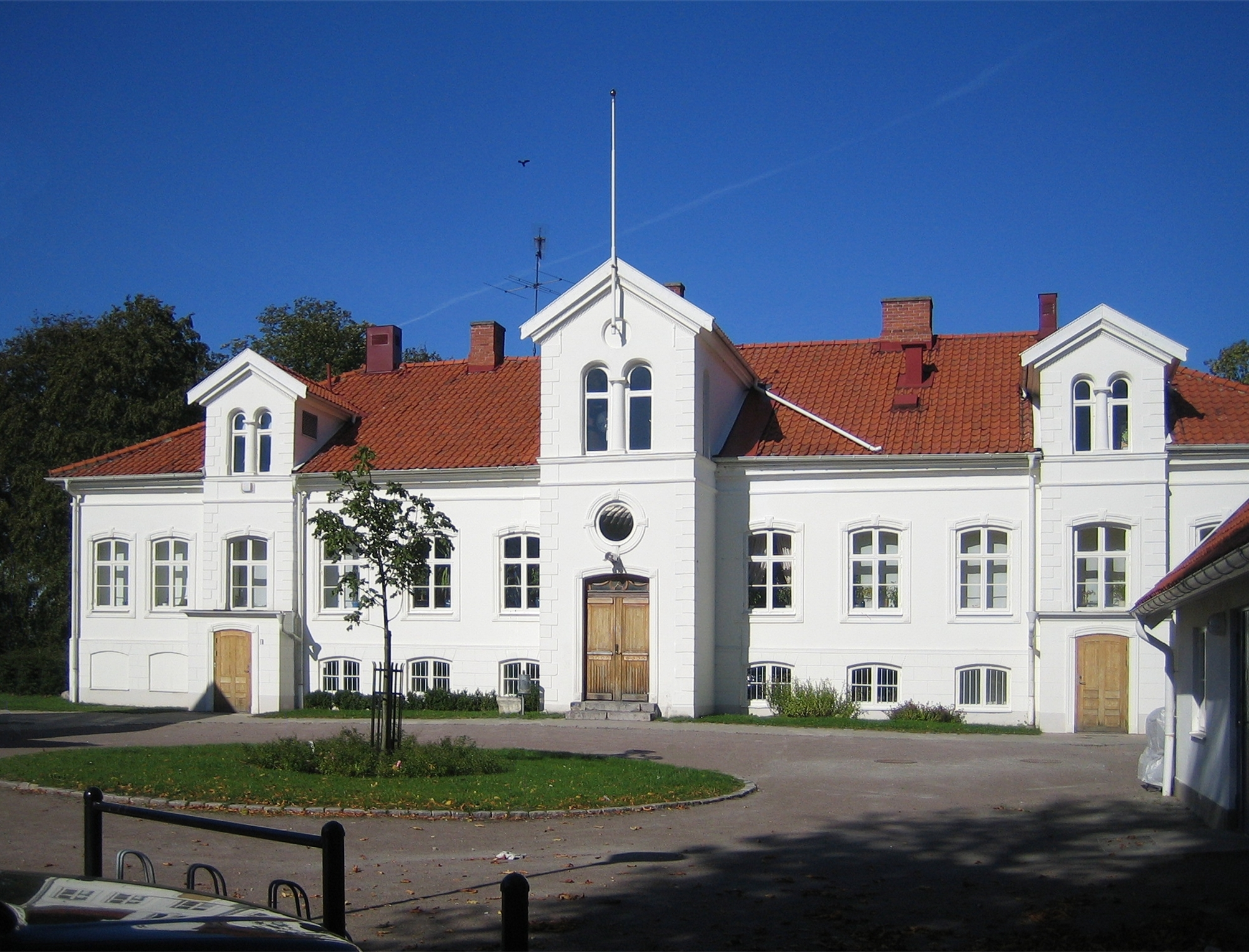
The mansion house.

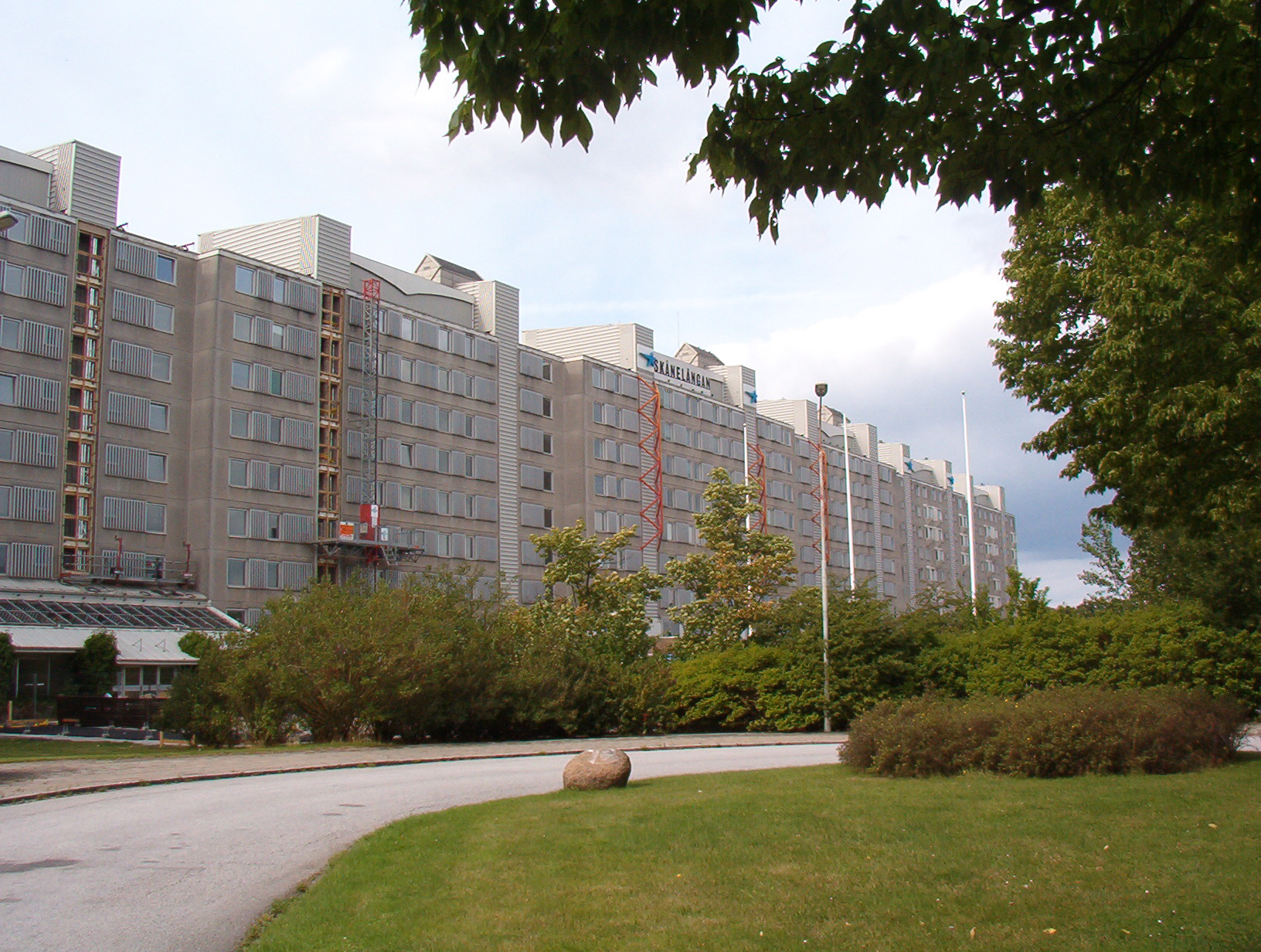
Tower block buildings in Rosengård.

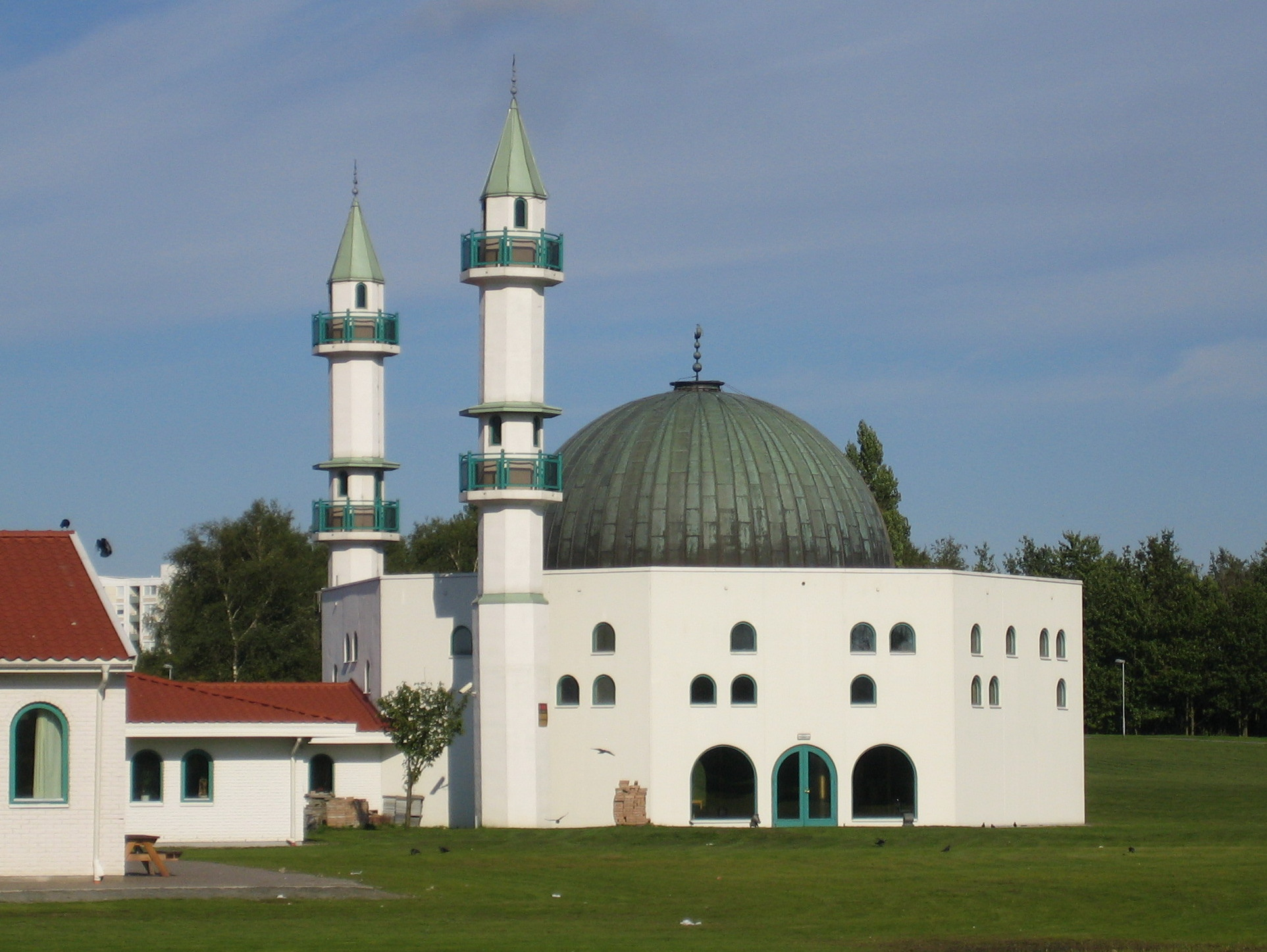
Malmö Mosque.

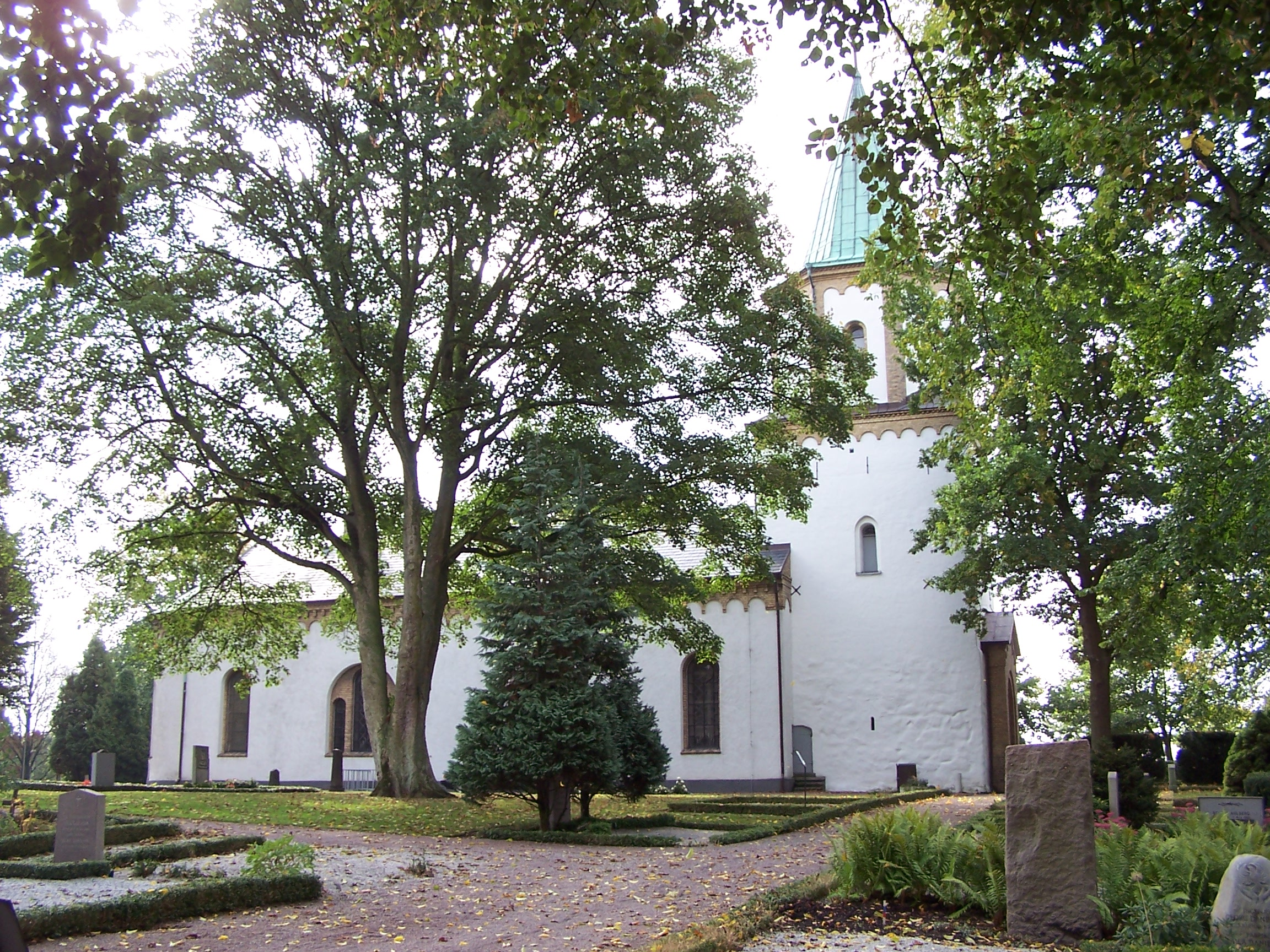
Västra Skrävlinge Church.

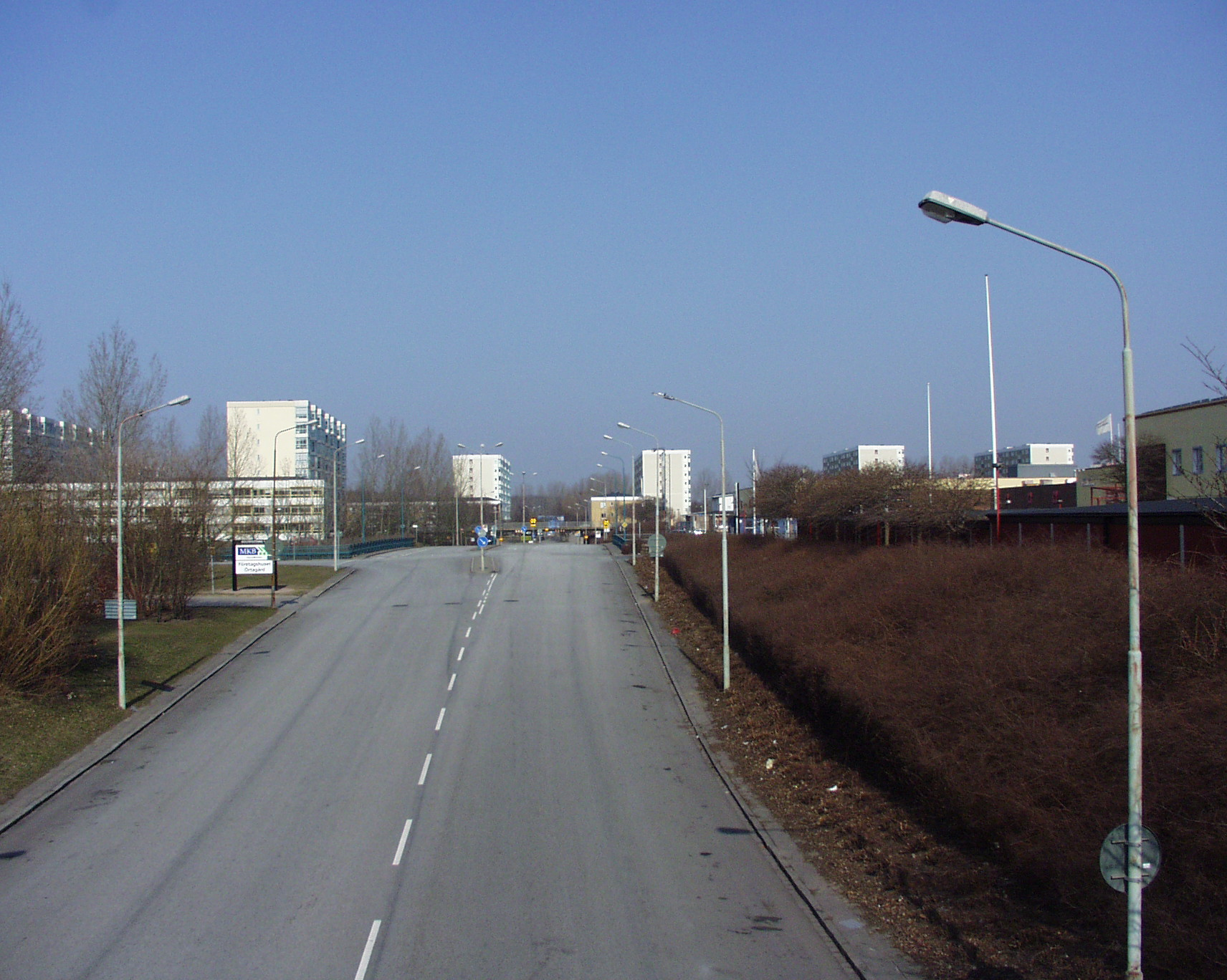
Central Rosengård, near Rosengård Centrum.

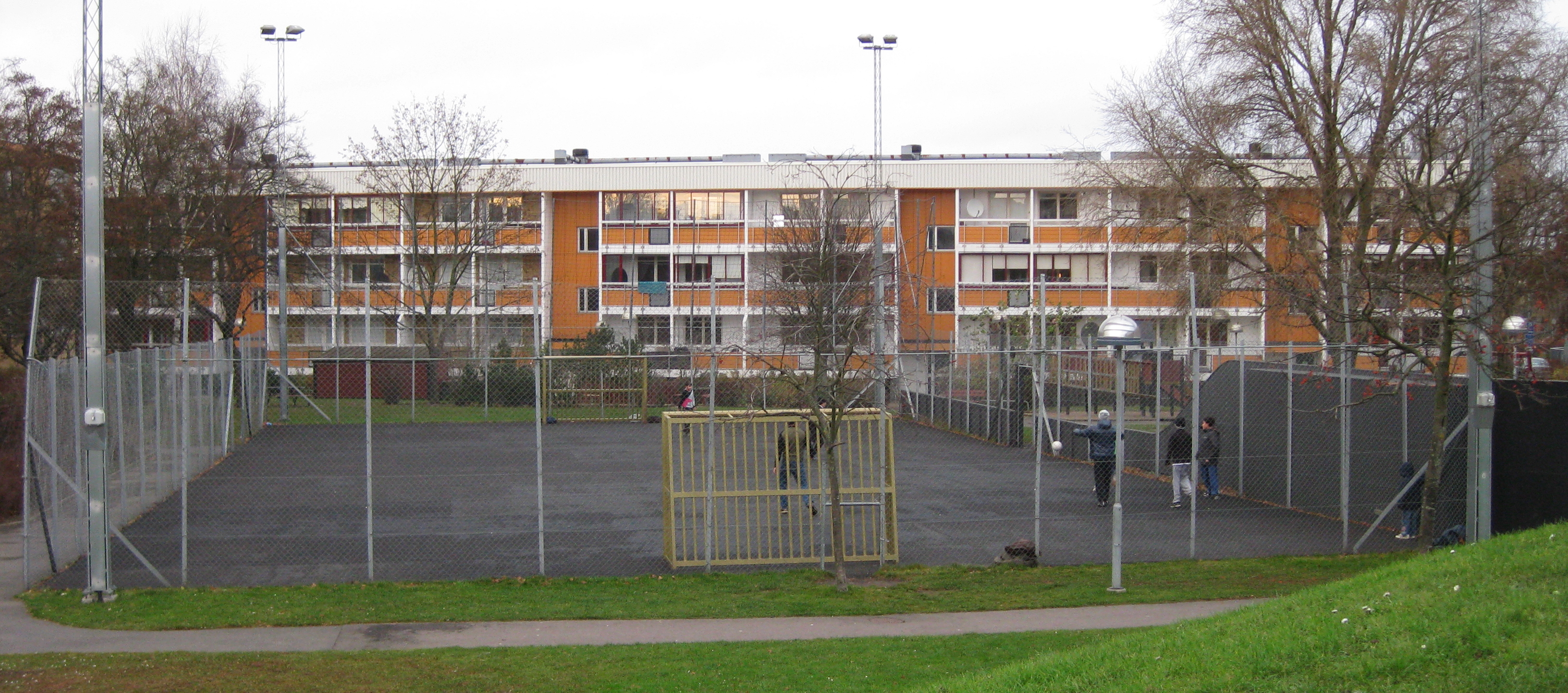
Zlatan Court.

== Places of worship ==
Malmö Mosque is located nearby. It is situated a few hundred metres from the church in Västra Skrävlinge. According to Swedish Defence University reports in 2009 and 2018, there were a number of Islamic prayer rooms (Swedish: källarmoskéer) in Rosengård that spread salafism, a fundamentalist interpretation of Islam.

== Demographics ==
Historical population
Year	Pop.
1961	5,250
1971	23,112
1981	18,006
2001	21,027
2004	21,526
2007	21,955
2011	23,653
2012	23,563

In 2007, 60% were born outside of Sweden. In 2008, 86% of the population were immigrants or Swedish-born children of immigrants.

The ten largest groups of foreign-born persons in 2010 were:

1. Iraq (2,957)
2. (Socialist Federal Republic of Yugoslavia) Former Yugoslavia (2,172)
3. Lebanon (1,370)
4. Bosnia and Herzegovina (1,211)
5. Somalia (550)
6. Denmark (541)
7. Poland (475)
8. Afghanistan (406)
9. Turkey (357)
10. Pakistan (230)

== Notable people ==
- Zlatan Ibrahimović
- Osama Krayem
- Yksel Osmanovski
- Labinot Harbuzi
- Goran Slavkovski
- Ilir Latifi
- Rebstar
- Saint
- Dollar Bill, hip hop group
- Pinar Yalcin
- Anel Ahmedhodžić
