= You Know Nothing About Love =

EP by Rebstar
- Released: November 30, 2015
- Genre: Hip hop
- Length: 20:51
- Label: Today Is Vintage
- Producer: Rebstar, Saint, DJ Pain 1, Madison

Rebstar chronology
Bad Karma (2012)	You Know Nothing About Love (2015)	Girls Like Nicole (2016)

You Know Nothing About Love is the debut extended play by Swedish recording artist Rebstar, released on November 30, 2015. It contains six songs, including the pre-released lead single Reputation.

== Track listing ==
No.	Title	Producer(s)	Length
1.	"All I Know / Flippa Med Maj"	"All I Know" produced by Saint, Rebstar "Flippa Med Maj" produced by Madison	3:51
2.	"Reputation"	Saint	2:34
3.	"Jumanji" (featuring Vivi)	DJ Pain 1	3:22
4.	"Makaveli & B.I.G."	Madison	3:13
5.	"Naked" (featuring Vivi)	Madison	3:38
6.	"I Swear"	DJ Pain 1	3:22

Notes

- "Makaveli & B.I.G." contain a sample of music publication VIBE interview with Tupac Shakur.

== Personnel ==
- Album artwork by Rebstar
- Engineered by Rebstar, Saint
- Mixed and mastered by Guy Joyner
