= Västra Kattarp =

- Neighbourhood
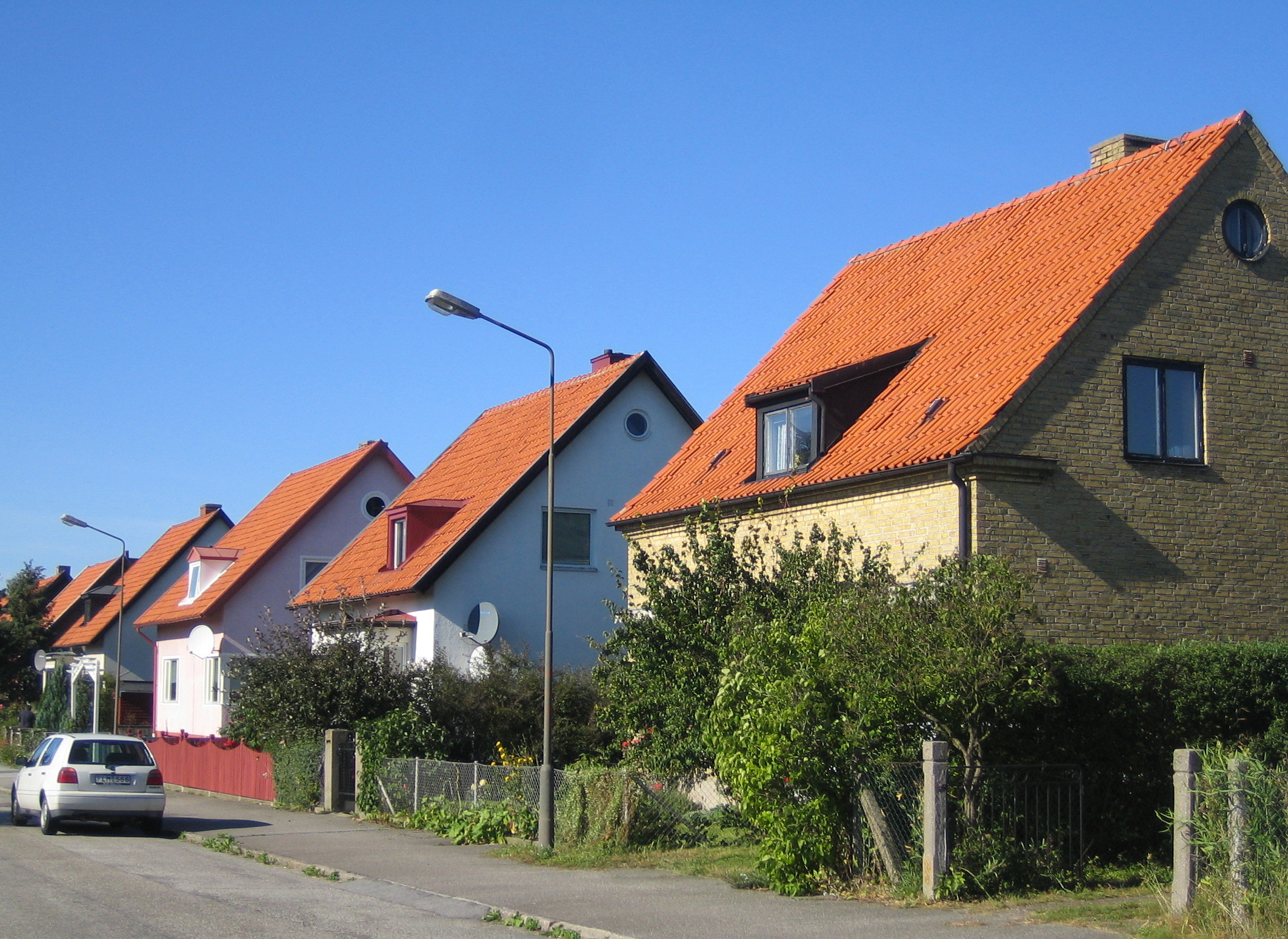
- Interactive map of Västra Kattarp
- Coordinates: 55°34′46″N 13°02′20″E
- Country: Sweden
- Province: Skåne
- County: Skåne County
- Municipality: Malmö Municipality
- Borough of Malmö: Rosengård

Population (1 January 2011)
  - Total: 1,663
- Time zone: UTC+1 (CET)
  - Summer (DST): UTC+2 (CEST)

Västra Kattarp is a neighbourhood of Malmö, situated in the district of Öster, Malmö Municipality, Skåne County, Sweden.
