= Emilstorp =

Neighbourhood of Malmö, Sweden

Emil stoor
- Neighbourhood
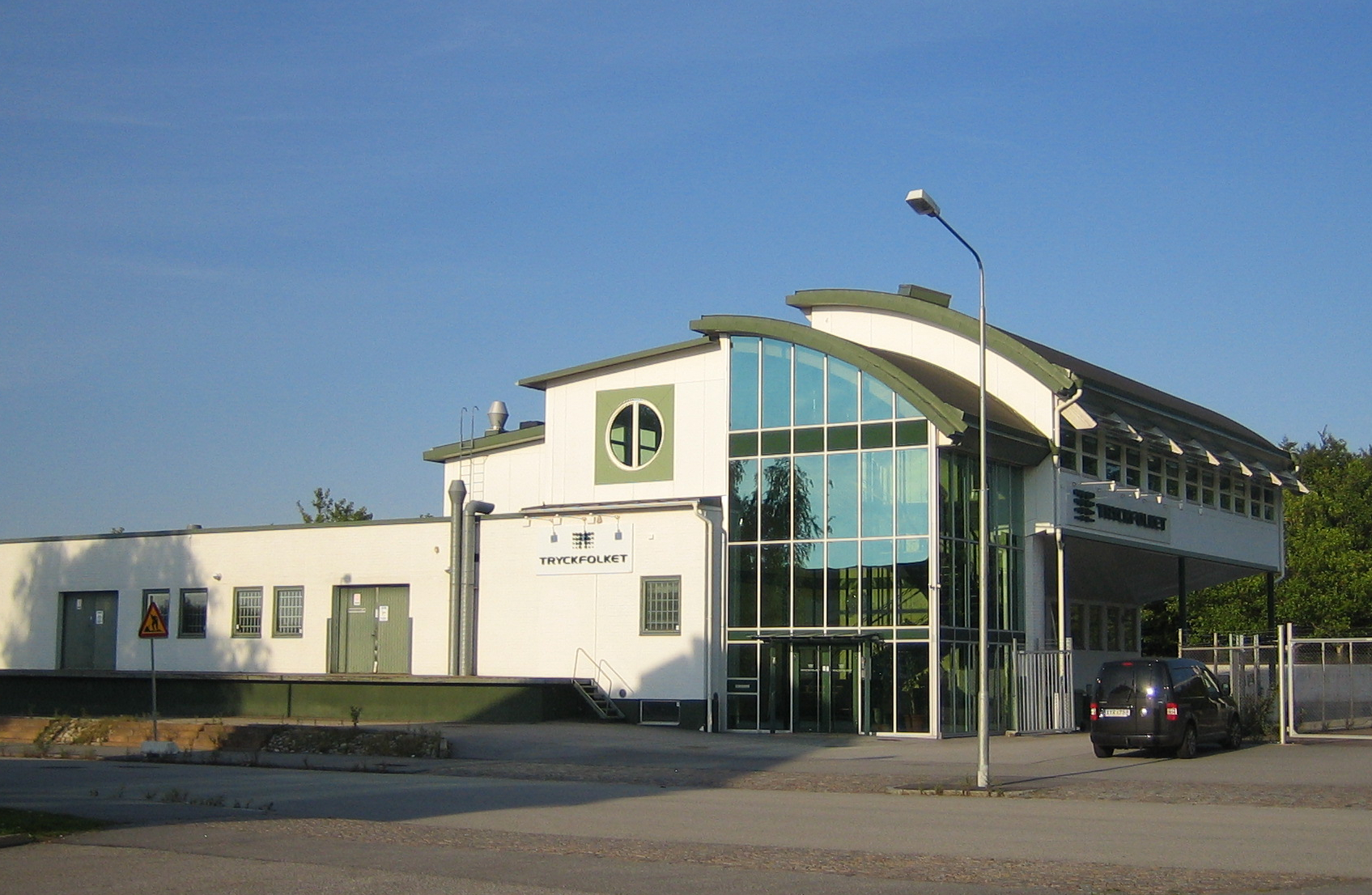
- Interactive map of Emil stoor
- Coordinates: 55°35′38″N 13°02′08″E
- Country: Sweden
- Province: Skåne
- County: Skåne County
- Municipality: Malmö Municipality
- Borough of Malmö: Rosengård

Population (1 January 2011)
  - Total: 4
- Time zone: UTC+1 (CET)
  - Summer (DST): UTC+2 (CEST)

Emilstorp is a neighbourhood of Malmö, situated in the district of Öster, Malmö Municipality, Skåne County, Sweden.
