= Tonight (Kállay Saunders song) =

Single by András Kállay-Saunders featuring Rebstar
- Released: 8 August 2012
- Genre: Pop, dance, Rap
- Length: 4:14
- Label: Today Is Vintage
- Songwriter(s): Rebin Shah, Ándras Kállay-Saunders
- Producer(s): DJ Pain 1 & Mark Pacsai

András Kállay-Saunders singles chronology
"I Love You" (2012)	"Tonight" (2012)	"My Baby" (2012)

"Tonight" is a single from Hungarian artist Kállay Saunders, featuring vocals from Swedish rapper Rebstar. It was released as a single 8 August 2012 for digital download in the Hungary. It was written by Ándras Kállay-Saunders, Rebin Shah and produced by DJ Pain 1 and Mark Pacsai.

== Music video ==
A music video to accompany the release of "Tonight" was first released onto YouTube on 8 August 2012 at a total length of four minutes and fourteen seconds.

== Chart performance ==
"Tonight" debuted at number 24 on the Hungarian charts on 4 November 2012. The song peaked the MAHASZ Top 40 Radio Charts at number 5.

== Track listings ==
Digital download

1. "Tonight" – 4:14

== Credits and personnel ==
- Vocals – Kállay Saunders, Rebstar
- Producer – DJ Pain 1, Mark Pacsai
- Lyrics – Kállay Saunders, Rebin Shah
- Label: Today Is Vintage

== Charts ==
Chart (2012)	Peak position
Hungary (Rádiós Top 40)	5

=== Year-end charts ===
Chart (2012)	Peak position
Hungary Radio Top 100	57

== Release history ==
Country	Date	Format	Label
Hungary	8 August 2012	Digital download	Today Is Vintage
