= Play My Song =

Single by András Kállay-Saunders featuring Rebstar
- Released: August 21, 2013
- Genre: Pop
- Length: 4:38
- Label: Today Is Vintage
- Songwriter(s): Ándras Kállay-Saunders, Rebstar
- Producer(s): Ándras Kállay-Saunders, Krisztián Zsakos

András Kállay-Saunders singles chronology
"My Baby" (2012)	"Play My Song" (2013)	"Running" (2013)

"Play My Song" is a single by American–Hungarian artist Kállay Saunders featuring Swedish rapper Rebstar. It was released on August 21, 2013, with a music video on October 7, 2013

== Chart performance ==
Play My Song peaked the MAHASZ Top 40 Radio Charts at 16.

=== Weekly charts ===
Chart (2013)	Peak position
Hungary (Rádiós Top 40)	16

== Track listings ==
Digital download

1. "Play My Song" – 4:38

== Credits and personnel ==
- Vocals – Kállay Saunders,
- Producer – Krisztián Szakos, Balazs Megyeri
- Lyrics – Kállay Saunders, Rebin Shah
- Label: Today Is Vintage

== Release history ==
Country	Date	Format	Label
Worldwide	August 21, 2013	Digital download	Today Is Vintage
