= Östra kyrkogården, Malmö =

Östra kyrkogården
- Neighbourhood
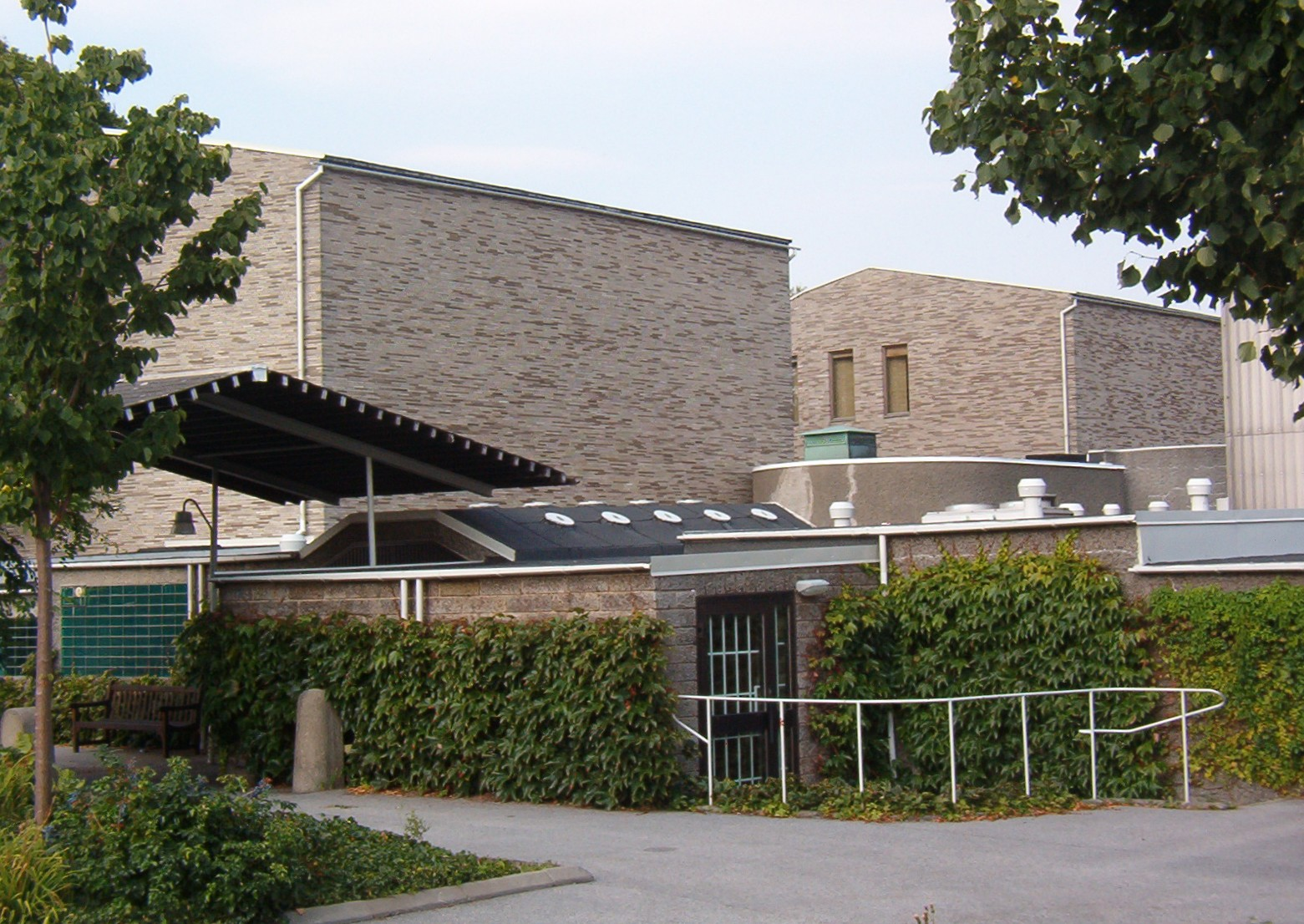
- Interactive map of Östra kyrkogården
- Coordinates: 55°35′37″N 13°02′43″E
- Country: Sweden
- Province: Skåne
- County: Skåne County
- Municipality: Malmö Municipality
- Borough of Malmö: Rosengård

Population (1 January 2011)
  - Total: 0
- Time zone: UTC+1 (CET)
  - Summer (DST): UTC+2 (CEST)

Östra kyrkogården is a cemetery in Malmö, situated in the district of Öster, Malmö Municipality, Skåne County, Sweden. It was designed by Sigurd Lewerentz.

== Quote ==
The following quote was machine translated from text taken from the Swedish language Wikipedia site.

East cemetery in Malmö is Malmö's largest cemetery.

In 1917 settled an architectural competition for a new cemetery in Malmö. The winning competition entry called "ridge" and was submitted by architect Sigurd Lewerentz. He came in the period 1917-1969 to respond to all major new construction and changes in the cemetery. He is also buried in the cemetery. There are also Gustaf Freij, Carl Herslow, Emil Mazetti-Nissen.

There are four chapels, St. Bridget of 1918, which is built in a classical style (now serves as the Orthodox Church) and the more modern twin chapels St. Gertrude and St. Knut from 1943. Even the small Chapel of Hope from the same year are in this building. Lewerentz's last building on the eastern cemetery (and last in general) became the widely acclaimed flower shop from 1969. It was built in raw concrete and has a single radical form of an oversimplification of nybrutalismens spirit, but with a sophisticated design details. Flower Kiosk and Eastern Cemetery architecture attracts interested visitors from all over the world.

In 1937 extended Malmö's Spårvägars line 6 up to the East entrance of the cemetery. In 1949, however, the tram line was replaced by buses.

East of the cemetery now has designated areas for Catholics, Orthodox, Jews and Muslims.
