= Örtagården, Malmö =

Örtagården
- Neighbourhood
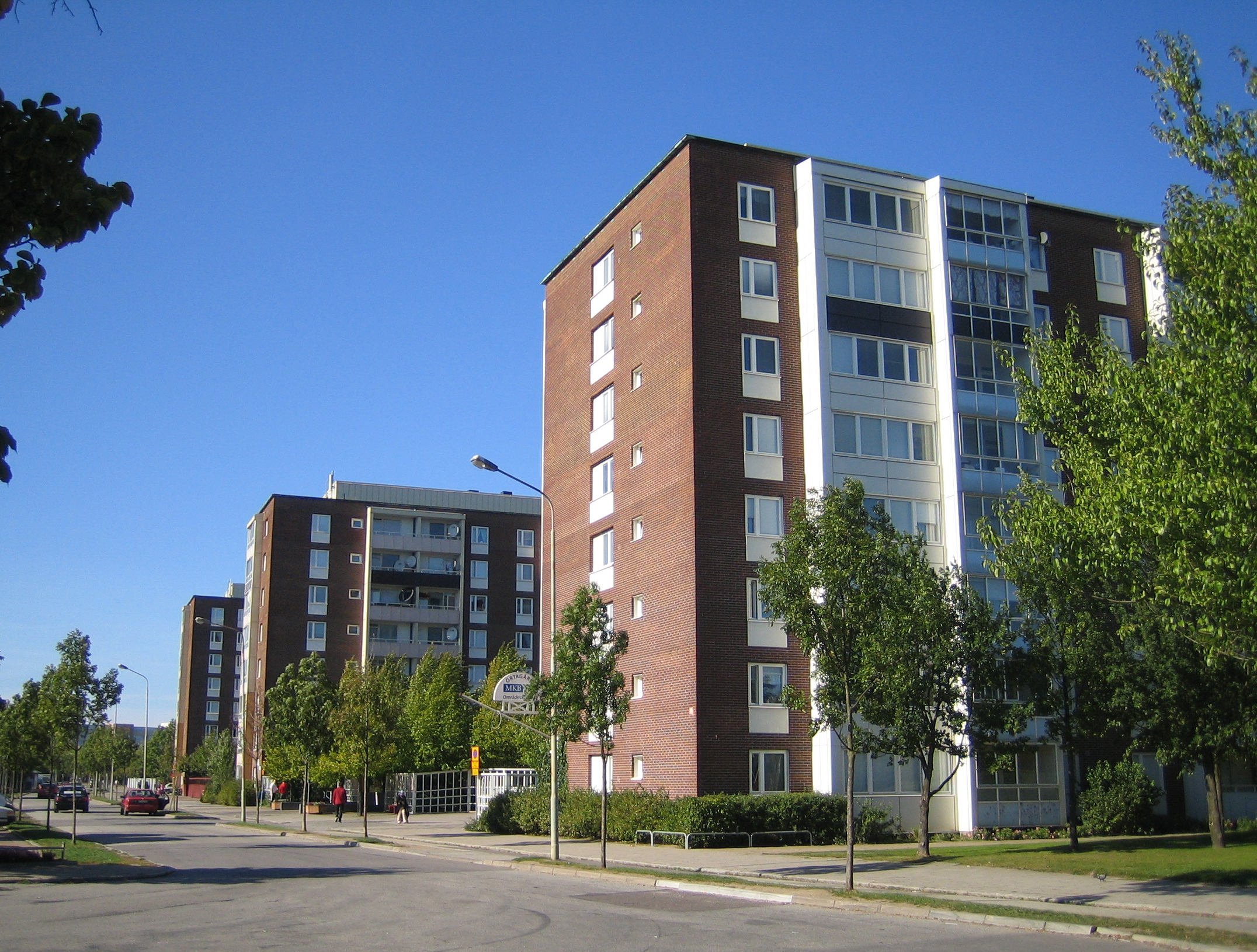
- Interactive map of Örtagården
- Coordinates: 55°35′03″N 13°02′26″E
- Country: Sweden
- Province: Skåne
- County: Skåne County
- Municipality: Malmö Municipality
- Borough of Malmö: Rosengård

Population (1 January 2011)
  - Total: 4,855
- Time zone: UTC+1 (CET)
  - Summer (DST): UTC+2 (CEST)

Örtagården is a neighbourhood of Malmö, situated in the district of Öster, Malmö Municipality, Skåne County, Sweden.
