= Törnrosen =

- Neighbourhood
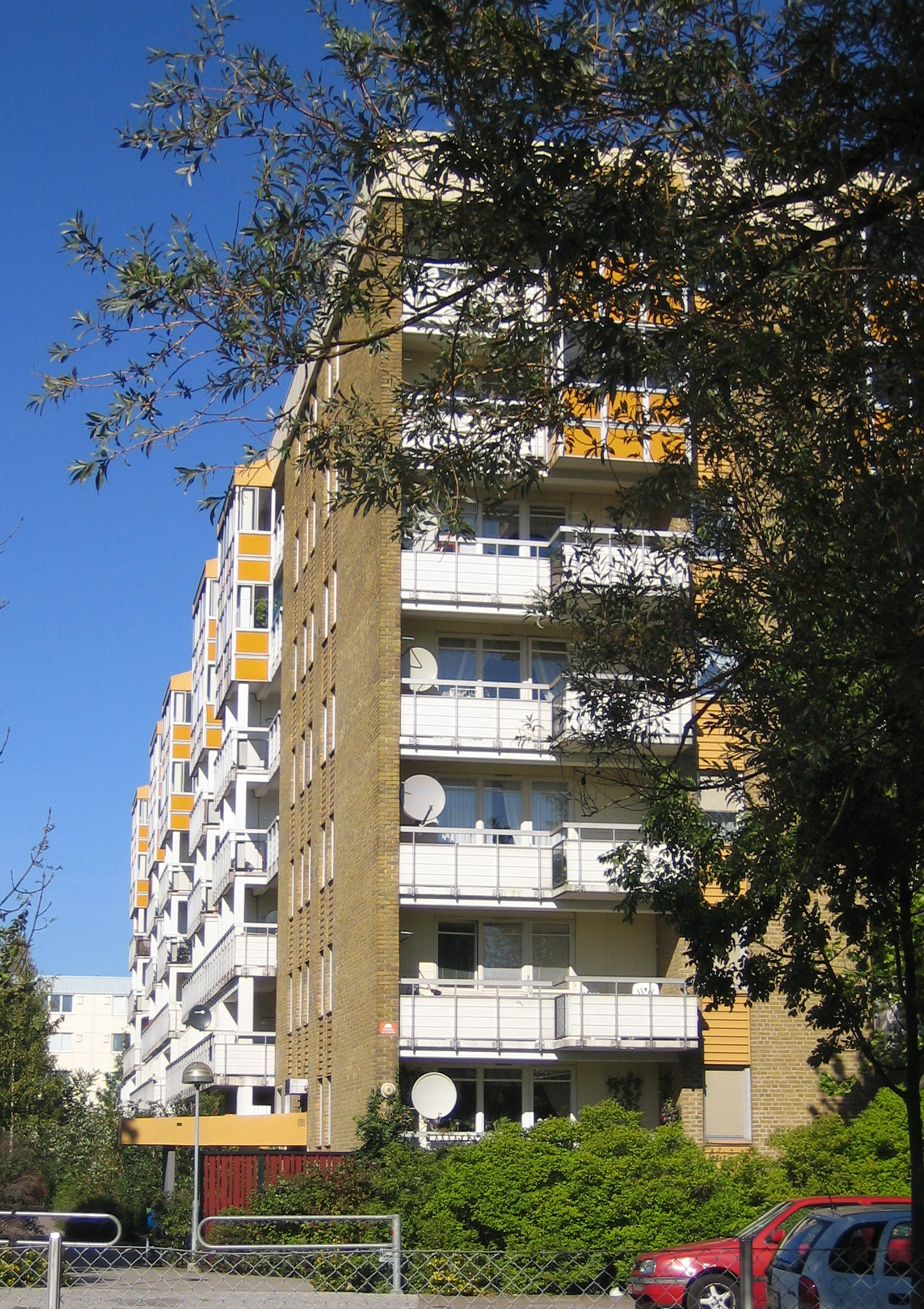
- Interactive map of Törnrosen
- Coordinates: 55°35′13″N 13°01′58″E
- Country: Sweden
- Province: Skåne
- County: Skåne County
- Municipality: Malmö Municipality
- Borough of Malmö: Rosengård

Population (1 January 2011)
  - Total: 3,094
- Time zone: UTC+1 (CET)
  - Summer (DST): UTC+2 (CEST)

Törnrosen is a neighbourhood of Malmö, situated in the district of Öster, Malmö Municipality, Skåne County, Sweden.
