= Saint (rapper) =

- Saint at Le Fest No. 002 2015

Background information
- Born: Mohammed Sillah; February 8, 1997 (age 29); Serekunda, The Gambia
- Genres: Hip hop; R&B
- Occupations: Rapper; singer; songwriter; record producer
- Instruments: Vocals; keyboards; sampler
- Years active: 2015–present
- Label: Today Is Vintage

Mohammed Sillah (born 8 February 1997), known by his stage name Saint, is a Gambian rapper, singer, songwriter, and record producer currently residing in Sweden. In 2015, he rose to fame in Sweden with the release of his debut single "Chillin".

== Early life ==
Mohammed Sillah was born in Serekunda, The Gambia on 8 February 1997. As a teenage refugee, he fled to Sweden in 2012 with only a backpack and the clothes he was wearing. Upon his arrival, he applied for asylum in Sweden.

Between 2012 and 2015, Saint was relocated to various refugee camps by the Swedish Migration Board. His application for asylum in Sweden was initially denied, as well as several appeals for over a year; leaving his stay in Sweden uncertain.

In early-2014 he was introduced to Swedish recording artist Rebstar through a mutual friend who worked at the refugee camp. Saint went on to eventually sign with Swedish record label Today Is Vintage. In March 2015, they released Saint's debut single "Chillin" to major acclaim, and quickly rose to prominence in Sweden. In 2015, Saint was granted permanent residency in Sweden.

Saint is currently a third-year student at Rytmus Gymnasium in Malmö majoring in music production.

== Career ==
In October 2014 Saint was featured on Rebstar's hit single "Safe Safe (040 Zlatan Remix)" to international acclaim Saint released his debut single Chillin on March 8, 2015, to major acclaim. A cover story in major publication Sydsvenskan quickly rose Saint to Swedish prominence. Chillin went on to be declared as one of Sweden's best rap songs of 2015 by Swedish Radio P3 and was featured by Spotify in Sweden.

He shortly followed up with two song releases, Badman and lefunkyintro. The latter is said to be the first offering from his upcoming body of work The New Funky Dread.

In October 2015 Saint made his productional debut on Rebstar's EP You Know Nothing About Love. In December 2015, Saint was awarded a scholarship by Swedish performing rights society STIM for his production and songwriting.

Consequently, Saint's upcoming debut album is said to be titled Asylum

On March 8, 2016, Noisey premiered a 10-track project by Saint titled The New Funky Dread, declaring it the best hip hop they've heard in years.

== Discography ==
=== Mixtapes ===
The New Funky Dread (2016)

=== Singles ===
- "Chillin" (2015)
- "Badman" (2015)
- "LeFunkyIntro" (2015)
- "Holly" feat. HB (2016)

=== Production credits ===
- Rebstar – Reputation (2015)
- Rebstar – All I Know (2015)

=== Collaborations ===
- "Safe Safe Remix" by Rebstar feat. Saint, Lilleman, Lazee & The C.I.T.Y. (2014)
