= Dollar Bill (group) =

Swedish hip hop group

Dollar Bill is a Swedish hip-hop group from Rosengård (Malmö County), Sweden established in 2002, and made up of Tax (real name Muhammed Ahmadi), The Beast (real name Besfort Sulejmani) and their friend Edo (real name Eldin Telalovic). Jassim "Jask" Ahmadi, Tax's brother, was a former group member, but left in 2014 for his job. Isen "Ice" Sulejmani (The Beast's brother) is another past member; he was left out of the formation in 2006 because the group wanted a more serious image. After putting out materials online via their MySpace account, they released their debut album Återfödelsen with collaborations from Gonza, Afasi, Organism12, Masse, Keione, AFC, Timbuktu, Chords, Hosam (from Highwon), Avastyle and Rock-a-spot. They have appeared in a number of shows, notably Nyhetsmorgon, and at festivals like Malmöfestivalen.

== In popular culture ==
A documentary, Blod, svett och hiphop, was made, detailing the activities of the group.

== Discography ==
=== Albums ===
- Återfödelsen
- 10 År I Gamet
- Olagliga Beats
