= Antonia Vai =

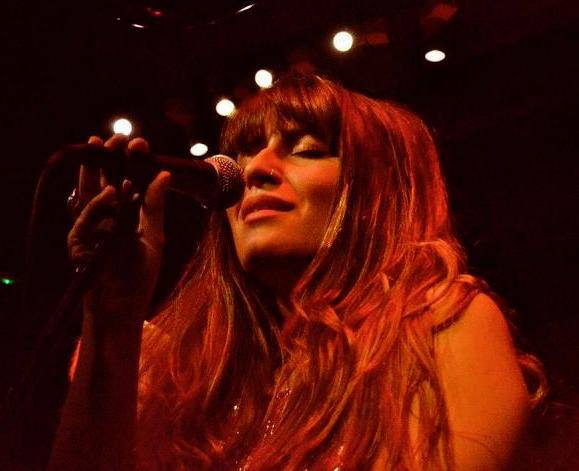
- Antonia Vai live in Stockholm

Background information
- Born: Antonia Morvai; 24 April 1988 (age 38); Stockholm, Sweden
- Genres: Pop, folk-pop, soul
- Occupations: Singer-songwriter, musician, music producer
- Instruments: Vocals, keyboard
- Years active: 2008–present
- Website: antoniavai.com

Antonia Morvai (born 24 April 1988), known professionally as Antonia Vai, is a Swedish singer, songwriter, music producer and activist of Hungarian descent.

== Life and career ==
The daughter of Hungarian emigrants, Antonia Vai was born in Stockholm, Sweden. She has been playing instruments and writing songs since her early childhood, drawing inspiration from the Legend of Zelda video game. She attended Adolf Fredrik's Music School and the "Rock & Soul" program at Fryshusets Gymnasium. Antonia also graduated from the music program at Liljeholmens folkhögskola (college) in Rimforsa, Sweden.

While she mostly writes songs and sings in English, she has written and performed several songs in both her native languages Swedish and Hungarian. In 2013, Vai moved to Budapest, Hungary.

=== Eurovision Song Contest 2016 ===
Antonia Vai participated in A dal 2016, a competition organised by the Hungarian public broadcaster Duna TV to select the Hungarian entry for the Eurovision Song Contest 2016. Vai performed the song "Who we are" as vocalist for András Kállay-Saunders. The song qualified with the highest of all scores in heat 2 on 30 January 2016. It qualified in the top 3 in Semi-final 1 on 13 February 2016, and competed again in the finals on 27 February 2016.

=== TV and radio ===
Antonia Vai has been featured at several occasions in Hungarian national TV and radio stations.

- The album release concert for "Stories after bedtime" in September 2014 was broadcast in its entirety on Hungarian national TV channel M2.
- A38 Ship presents: Antonia Vai
- "Az A38 Hajó Színpadán: Antonia Vai" (Singer-Songwriter evening on the A38 Ship.) Wednesday, 10 February 23:20 on M2.
- Antonia Vai recorded a one-hour acoustic session for the Hungarian Radio MR2 Akusztik program, which was broadcast nationwide on 27 December 2014.
- In October 2013, Antonia Vai performed a few songs live at Tilos Rádió in Budapest.

=== Live performances ===
==== Müpa, Palace of Arts, Budapest ====
In June 2015, Antonia Vai headlined a sold-out venue at the Müpa, Palace of Arts in Budapest with several musical guest artists, for example Sena Dagadu (Irie Maffia), the British/Ghanaian rapper M3NSA, Saiid from Akkezdet Phiai and members of the gypsy-punk orchestra Bohemian Betyars.

==== BalconyTV ====
Balcony TV Budapest hosted an episode with Antonia Vai Band feat. Sena in March 2015.

==== Supporting performances ====
Antonia Vai collaborated as a support band on Quimby's national autumn tour in 2013, playing as opening act for them in five locations across Hungary. On 12 May 2015 Antonia Vai was supporting act for the Belgian musician Selah Sue. On 15 April 2017 Antonia Vai was supporting act for Lebanese singer Yasmine Hamdan.

=== Other ventures ===
Antonia Vai was interviewed and photographed in a six-page feature of the Hungarian September 2015 edition of Elle magazine.

In 2017 Antonia appeared in the road-movie series Trip To The Moon which aired on Hungarian TV channel RTL.

== Discography ==
=== Albums ===
- Lovers and Prophets

- Release date: September 2012
- Format: digital download

1. "Don't Let The Bedbugs Bite"
2. "Macho Woman"
3. "Confessions Of Berlin"
4. "Moth To The Flame"
5. "Rainy June"
6. "The Smallest Song In The World"
7. "Time Killer"
8. "Waiting For War"
9. "Snow White"
10. "In The Early Hours"
11. "Storms"
12. "Down The Rabbit Hole"
- Dirt From When The Earth Was Flat

- Release date: September 2012
- Format: digital download

1. "Once I knew A Boy"
2. "Riots"
3. "Pyromani (lek inte med elden)"
4. "Dolinsko"
5. "The Untold Tale Of Ikaros"
6. "A Song For The Winter Sky (And You)"
7. "43 Seconds To Hiroshima"
8. "Naked And Quiet"
9. "If You Think About It"
10. "Just Another Nocturne To Clear My Mind"
11. "Kittens In Trees"
12. "It's 6 In The Morning And I Think I Love You"
- Stories After Bedtime

- Release date: September 2014
- Format: CD, digital download

1. "Intro"
2. "Don't Let The Bedbugs Bite"
3. "The Pirate's Waltz"
4. "People"
5. "In The Devil's Catacomb"
6. "Arkansas"
7. "The Trouble With You"
8. "Kittens in Trees"
9. "Click and Bang"
- Tightrope

- Release date: March 2016
- Format: CD, digital download

1. "Fisherman Feat. M3NSA"
2. "Remember How Feat. Saiid"
3. "Don't Fall In Love With Me"
4. "The Hand I Raise"
- Ritual

- Release date: September 2017
- Format: CD, digital download

1. "Intro"
2. "Mantra"
3. "Love Song for an Ex"
4. "Mad Heart"
5. "The Witch"
6. "Brand Old Revolution"
7. "The Devil Waits For Me To Slip"
8. "Warrior Soul"
9. "Laika's Ballad"
10. "Secret Life"

=== Singles ===
- Pirates Waltz

- Release date: August 2014
- Format: digital download

- Remember How Feat. Saiid

- Release date: May 2015
- Format: digital download

- Warrior Soul

- Release date: May 2017
- Format: digital download

- GHOST

- Release date: April 2020
- Format: digital download

== Music videos ==
- "Antonia Vai Band Feat. Saiid - Remember How (Official Video)"
- "Antonia Vai - Don't Let The Bedbugs Bite"
- "Antonia Vai - Warrior Soul (Official Video)"
- "Antonia Vai - Mad Heart (Official Video)"
- "Antonia Vai - GHOST (Official Video)
- "Antonia Vai - Exile (Official Video)"
- "Antonia Vai - Kali's Song (Official Live Video)"
- "Antonia Vai - Where The Bluebirds Fly"

== MiaFemme Podcast ==
The MiaFemme Podcast ("Girltalk Without Taboos"), is a Hungarian podcast created by Luca Wilson and Antonia Vai in 2020. MiaFemme is a feminist, anti-racist, LGBTQIA+ friendly, sex positive, body positive podcast that aims to create a safe, open-minded space for personal and political discussions. In 2022 hostesses Bernadett Rack and Lucy Cadena joined the podcast. They release episodes weekly, each episode based around one theme, and topics of discussions have included emotional labour, polyamory, the female orgasm, hair removal, catcalling, colourism, Black Lives Matter, queerness, male allyship, or harmful gender roles and stereotypes.
