= Pınar Yalçın =

Turkish-Swedish footballer (born 1988)

Personal information
- Date of birth: 7 November 1988 (age 37)
- Place of birth: Rosengård, Malmö, Sweden
- Position: Forward

Youth career
- 1993–2005: Malmö FF Dam
- 2005–2006: Malmö Anadolu BI

Senior career*
Years	Team	Apps	(Gls)
2007–2010	BK Olympic	112	(217)
2010–2011	BK Kick		
2011–2012	Kvarnby IK		
2012–2013	1. Dalby GIF		
2013–2016	Husie IF		
2017-2018	IFK Trelleborg		

International career^{‡}
2013–2015	Turkey	5	(0)
- * Club domestic league appearances and goals ‡ National team caps and goals as of 13 February 2014

Pınar Yalçın (born 7 November 1988) is a Turkish-Swedish women's football forward who played in the Swedish Women's Football Division 2 between 2013 and 2017. She also played for the Turkey women's national football team in 2015. She is nicknamed "Pinnen" (Swedish for "the stick") by her fans.

== Personal life ==
Yalçın was born in Rosengård district of Malmö in Sweden. Her parents immigrated to Sweden from Turkey. She has one sister and two brothers.

== Playing career ==
=== Club ===
She began playing in the youth team of Malmö FF Dam, which was renamed to LdB FC Malmö in 2007, and then to FC Rosengård in 2013. Yalçın was transferred by the Turkish community club Malmö Anadolu BI.

After playing briefly for BK Kick, BK Olympic, Kvarnby IK and 1. Dalby GIF, she signed with Husie IF for the 2013–14 season.

In 2013, she also officiated at women's football matches in other league divisions.

=== International ===
Yalçın was called up to take part in the Turkey national team for the 2015 FIFA Women's World Cup qualification round matches. In a newspaper interview, she emphasized that she preferred to play for the Turkey national team. She added that she is happy to make her debut in the match against England women's national football team.

Yalçın was capped four times in the Turkey national team competing in the 2015 FIFA Women's World Cup qualification (UEFA) matches.
