= Rosengård Centrum =

Coordinates: 55°35′8″N 13°2′41″E

- Neighbourhood
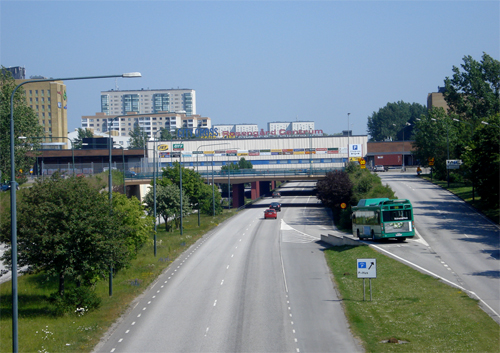
- Interactive map of Rosengård Centrum
- Country: Sweden
- Province: Skåne
- County: Skåne County
- Municipality: Malmö Municipality
- Borough of Malmö: Öster

Population (1 January 2011)
  - Total: 0
- Time zone: UTC+1 (CET)
  - Summer (DST): UTC+2 (CEST)

Rosengård Centrum is a neighbourhood of Malmö, situated in the district of Öster, Malmö Municipality, Skåne County, Sweden. It has a shopping centre, which opened in 1971.
