= András Kállay-Saunders =

Hungarian-American musician (born 1985)

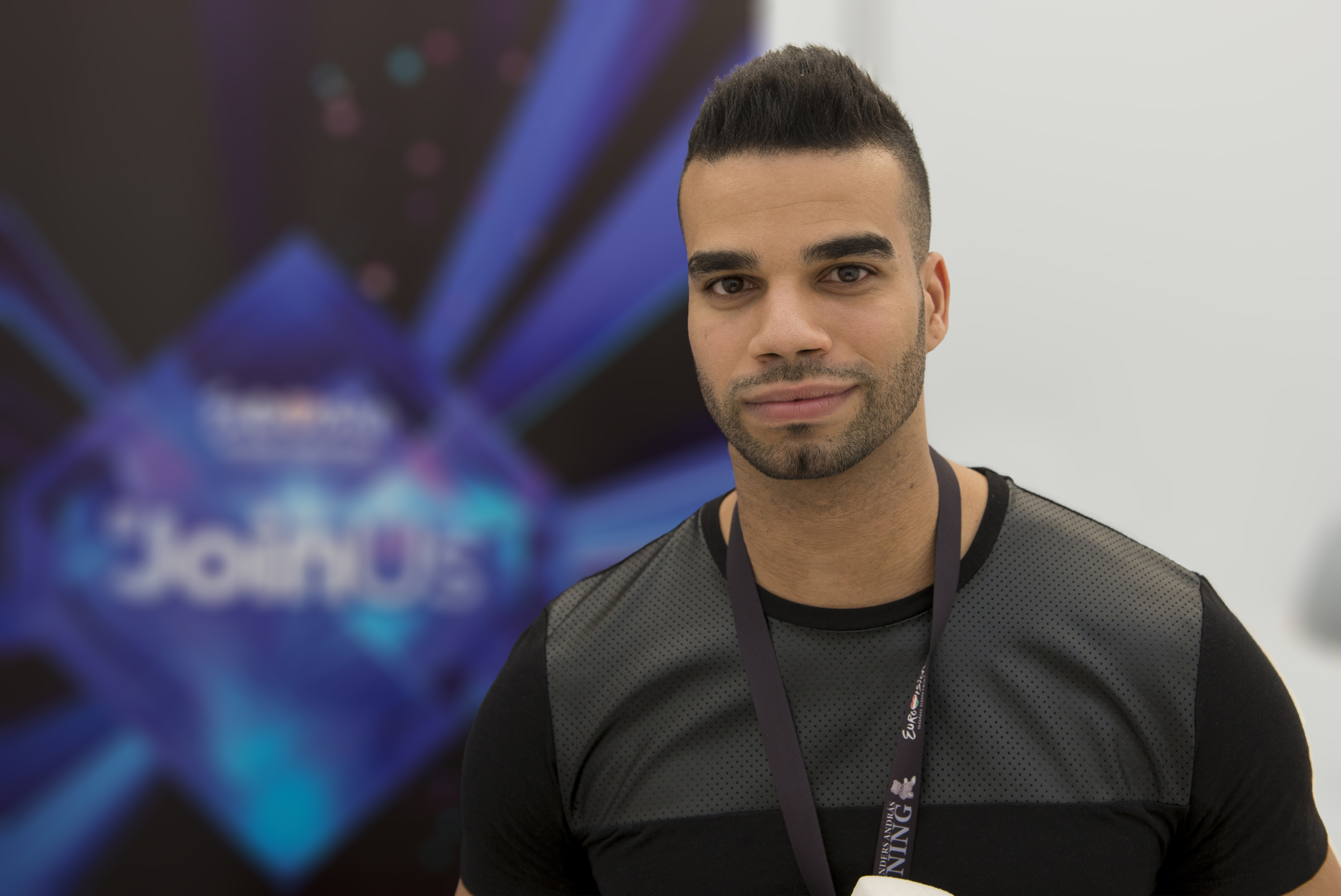
- Kállay-Saunders, 2014

Background information
- Also known as: Kállay Saunders
- Born: András Kállay-Saunders; January 28, 1985 (age 41); New York City, United States
- Genres: R&B; pop; soul; hip hop
- Occupations: Singer; record producer
- Instrument: Vocals
- Years active: 2010–present
- Label: Today Is Vintage

András Kállay-Saunders (born January 28, 1985), also known as Kállay Saunders, is a Hungarian-American singer, songwriter and record producer. He represented Hungary in the Eurovision Song Contest 2014 in Copenhagen, Denmark with the song "Running".

== Early life ==
András Kállay-Saunders was born in New York City, United States to Hungarian model Katalin Kállay and American soul-singer and producer Fernando Saunders. He is a descendant of the noble Kállay family from his maternal side.

Throughout most of his childhood, Kállay-Saunders's father was touring due to his music career, but Kállay-Saunders was frequently brought along to observe. Kállay-Saunders became particularly influenced by Motown during trips to Detroit, where his father began his career.

In 2010, Kállay-Saunders decided to visit Hungary to spend time with his grandmother, who was ill at the time. During his visit in Hungary, he noticed a television commercial urging talented singers to audition for the nation's televised talent competition Megasztár, which he ultimately did, beginning his music career.

== Career ==
Kállay ended up finishing fourth in the contest and shortly after signed to Universal and permanently moved to Hungary. Kállay released two singles under Universal, "Csak Veled" and "I Love You", both of which became smash hits in Hungary, peaking respectively No. 7 and No. 2 on the Top 40 Hungarian Billboards.

In August 2012 Kállay collaborated with Swedish rapper Rebstar and American producer DJ Pain 1 on Kállays single "Tonight". "Tonight" peaked No. 4 on the Top 40 Hungarian Billboards, making it Kállay's third hit single to reach the top 10 charts.

In November 2012 Kállay announced his departure from Universal and signed a worldwide record deal with Swedish record label Today Is Vintage.

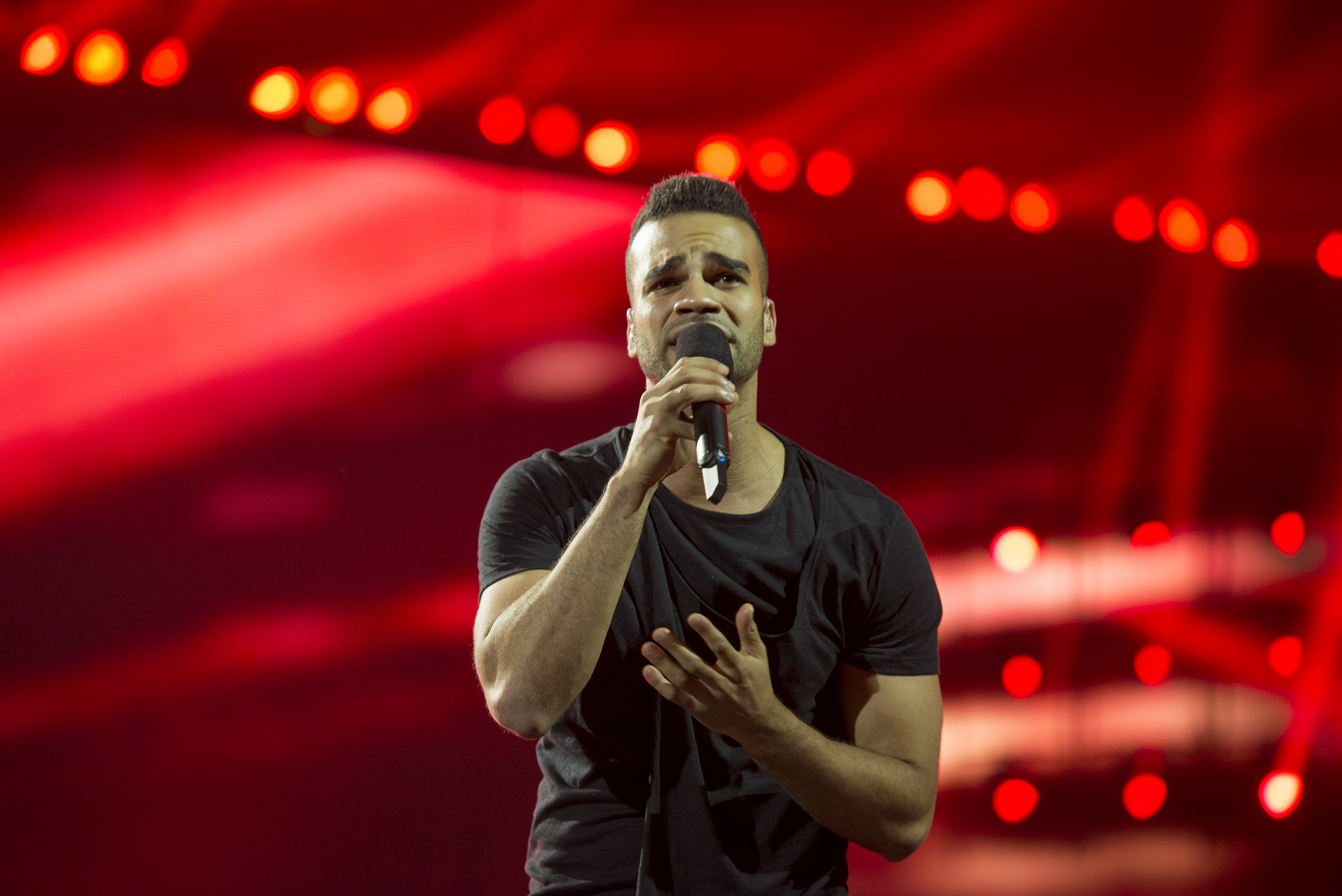
Kállay performing at the Eurovision Song Contest 2014

On December 20, 2012 Kállay released his single "My Baby" which also serves as his contribution in the Hungarian "A Dal" Eurovision Song Contest. On February 9 Kállay performed the song in the contest to critical acclaim, garnering 48 out of a maximum of 50 points voted by the jury. Following the performance, My Baby catapulted to #1 on iTunes (Hungary). The music video for My Baby was released on February 8, 2013 and is directed by Los Tiki Pictures. My Baby peaked #1 on the Hungarian iTunes store on March 3, 2013, and charted #1 on the Hungarian Top 40 Radio Charts on April 11, 2013.

Kállay's debut album titled Delivery Boy was released in 2015 on iTunes.

Kállay represented Hungary in the Eurovision Song Contest 2014 in Copenhagen, Denmark. He came in 5th place with his song "Running".

Since the Eurovision Song Contest 2014, Kállay has gone on to found his own band, Kállay-Saunders Band. He has since then released multiple singles with the band, and collaborated with A Dal 2015 participants, creating acoustic versions of their songs and performing as an interval act in the show. His last album Delivery Boy was one of the 19 records nominated for the IMPALA Album of the Year Award.

He, again, has returned to the 2016 edition of A Dal, this time with his band and vocalist Antonia Vai, performing Who We Are. They made it to be the last four finalists, but didn't win. They were again announced to participate in A Dal 2017 with the song Seventeen. They progressed to the final. In the 2019 edition, he participated again as a member of The Middletonz with Dutch rapper Farshad Alebatool with the song Roses. They made it to the final.

== Discography ==
=== Extended plays ===
List of EPs, with selected details
Title	Details
4am in Budapest (with Young Trabajo)	Released: November 2024

=== Singles ===
Single	Year	Peak chart positions					Album
Single	Year	HUN	DEN	GER	IRE	UK	Album
"Csak Veled" (Only with You)	2011	—	—	—	—	—	Non-album singles
"I Love You"	2012	—	—	—	—	—	Non-album singles
"Tonight" (feat. Rebstar)	2012	5	—	—	—	—	Non-album singles
"My Baby"	2013	1	—	—	—	—	Non-album singles
"Play My Song" (feat. Rebstar)	2013	16	—	—	—	—	Non-album singles
"Running"	2014	1	40	93	92	116	Delivery Boy (with Kállay-Saunders band)
"Juliet"	2014	—	—	—	—	—	Delivery Boy (with Kállay-Saunders band)
"Victory"	2015	—	—	—	—	—	Delivery Boy (with Kállay-Saunders band)
"Faded"	2015	—	—	—	—	—	Delivery Boy (with Kállay-Saunders band)
"Young"	2015	—	—	—	—	—	Delivery Boy (with Kállay-Saunders band)
"Who We Are"	2016	—	—	—	—	—	TBA
"#Grind"	2016	—	—	—	—	—	TBA
"17"	2016	—	—	—	—	—	TBA
"I Need You Right Now"	2025	—	—	—	—	—	Non-album singles
"—" denotes a single that did not chart or was not released.

== See also ==
- Hungarian pop

Awards and achievements
Preceded by ByeAlex with "Kedvesem"	Hungary in the Eurovision Song Contest; 2014	Succeeded by Boggie with "Wars for Nothing"
