= DJ Pain 1 =

- Born: Pacal Alejandro Bayley; October 21, 1983 (age 42); Madison, Wisconsin, United States
- Genres: Hip Hop
- Occupation: Record producer
- Instrument: Keyboard, DAW
- Years active: 2006–present
- Website: Official website

Pacal Alejandro Bayley (born October 21, 1983), better known by his stage name DJ Pain 1, is an American record producer and DJ from Madison, Wisconsin. He has produced for artists including Young Jeezy, 50 Cent, Schoolboy Q, Ludacris, Lil Baby, Sarkodie, Rick Ross, Public Enemy, Sole, and Nipsey Hussle.

== Career ==
SPIN Magazine referred to DJ Pain 1 as a "beat-master". He placed his first major composition with Young Jeezy on the album The Recession, that went on to sell over a million copies domestically; earning Bayley an RIAA Platinum Certification. He is also known for his music production and marketing tutorials on YouTube as well as the free sample and sound kits he releases regularly.

Since earning his platinum record, Pain 1 has composed tracks for numerous artists, earned a master's degree in the field of applied English linguistics, released both a mixtape series entitled Painkillerz as well as an instrumental series entitled Undressed Instrumentals, and frequently tours the U.S. as tour DJ for Coast 2 Coast LIVE. From the year 2008 until the year 2012, Pain 1 hosted Madison's first FM Hip-Hop mixshow on WJQM (93.1 Jamz). He returned to the station in 2017 as the Tuesday night "Freakmix" mixshow DJ.

In late 2016, DJ Pain 1, along with fellow Madison native Ted Park, signed a record deal with Capitol Records/Universal Music (FR) following the viral success of the song "Hello (Who Is This)."

Along with fellow producers DreamLife, Memory, and STACKTRACE, he forms the collective The Vintage Vxndals.

As of February 5, 2022, DJ Pain 1 has been RIAA certified multi-platinum after co-producing "Switch it Up" for Pooh Shiesty on his album Shiesty Season

== Production discography ==
=== 2008 ===
Young Jeezy - The Recession

- Don't Do It

2008 Billboard R&B/Hip Hop Albums

Stat Quo

- Bad Man

The Invisible Man

- Stylin'

The Status Report

- B.A.N.

Emilio Rojas

- Like a Drummer

=== 2009 ===
Young Chris - The Network 2

- Here I Come

Yo Gotti

- Save da Trap (Letter to Young Jeezy & Gucci Mane)

God-Des and She - Three

- Love Machine
- Respect My Fresh
- Blue in the Face
- Drum Circle

Alfamega

- Round One

=== 2010 ===
Lil Chuckee

- Big Money Talk (feat. 2 Chainz & Yo Gotti)

Charles Lee Ray

- Road to Success

Smoke DZA - Substance Abuse

- Ginger Rothstein

Roccett - America's Nightmare

- I'm the Shit (feat. Dae One)

Rebstar - Rebstar’s Arrival 2.0

- I Like it (feat. Ray J)

Chuck D (as Mistachuck) - Don't Rhyme for the Sake of Riddlin'

- Tear Down That Wall

I-20 - The Sleeping Giant

- Still Grinding

Vado

- M.O.V.A.D.O. (Fly Again) (feat. Mavado)

Vivian Green - Beautiful

- Search is Over

Snow tha Product

- Fresher Than a Mug

=== 2011 ===
Kool G Rap - Offer You Can't Refuse

- The Fix

Rebstar - Rebstar’s Arrival 2.0

- Down

U.S.D.A. - CTE or Nothing

- CTE or Nothing (feat. Young Jeezy)

(Co-produced with Djay Cas)

Mistah F.A.B. - Love Lies and Alibis

- That's My Chick (feat. Tiggy)

Jim Jones

- The Crash

Masspike Miles - The Road Less Traveled

- Making Love
- Ur Kind (feat. Smoke Bulga)

Meek Mill

- Love This City (feat. Masspike Miles, Pill, Magazeen & Triple C's)

Smokes

- Roots (feat. Joell Ortiz & Rain)

Rain - The Magic Hour II (full album)

- 1. Intro
- 2. Big Time
- 3. Still High
- 4. No Coming Back
- 5. Come On 5
- 6. Rich Forever
- 7. Ring Size Intermission
- 8. Then I Met You (feat. Krillz)
- 9. Peaked Lapels (feat. Keep Pushin)
- 10. Magic Moments
- 11. Once In a While (feat. Krillz)
- 12. Miracles
- 13. Forgive or Forget (feat. Keep Pushin)

I-20

- 100 Percent
- Throw it Out

The Grey Area

- Hood Shit (feat. Gudda Gudda)
- War Shit (feat. The Outlawz)
- My Beautiful Bitch (feat. Osei)

Shyne

- Trunk Full (feat. Gucci Mane)

New Boyz

- Backseat (Official Urban Remix)

Black Rob - Game Tested, Streets Approved

- No Fear (feat. Sean Price)

Papoose

- King of the Hood (feat. Nathaniel)

Vado - Slime Flu 2

- What's Poppin'
- All the Drama

=== 2012 ===
50 Cent - 5 (Murder by Numbers)

- Can I Speak to You (feat. Schoolboy Q)

Rain

- Kick it Over Here

The Magic hour 3

- Intro
- Lights Down Low (feat. Cardi)
- I'll Stay
- You Were Here

GT Garza, Scooby, Kirko Bangz, ProPain, Greezo, Brian Angel

- Living To Die

Masspike Miles - Say Hello to Forever

- Say Hello to Forever

Young Buck - Live Loyal Die Rich

- Personal (feat. Cruna)

Soulja Boy

- Reppin 4 The Ocean

Gorilla Zoe - Walkin' Money Machine

- Work (feat. PTE)

Jim Jones - Vampire Life 2 : F.E.A.S.T. The Last Supper

- Top of the Year (feat. Sen City, Mel Matrix, T.W.O, Lady H, Trav, Shoota, Chris Luck, Pure

Huey

- Feel it

Doughboy - Office Referrals

- 100 (feat. Huey & Young Rhome)

Mistah F.A.B.

- Killin' These Rap Niggas (feat. Fred the Godson & Ya Boy)

Beastmode

- Bishop

Scotty Boi - A.W.O.L. 2

- To the Money (feat. Traxx Sanders)
- Fuego

Public Enemy - The Evil Empire of Everything

- The Evil Empire of...

Most of My Heroes Still Don't Appear on No Stamp

- Hoovermusic

(Co-produced with Divided Souls Entertainment)

Ransom - Winter's Coming

- Insanity

Chi Ali

- Baby Sky (feat. Maino)
- Girls Around Me (feat. Mysonne)

2 Pistols - Arrogant

- Top Shotta
- My Life Freestyle

Kállay Saunders

- Tonight (feat. Rebstar)

Joe Budden - A Loose Quarter

- Pain Won't Stop

King L - Drilluminati

- My Hoes They Do Drugs (feat. Pusha T & Juicy J)

Bo Deal - Welcome to Klanville

- If Tomorrow Never Comes

The Chicago Code 3 : Revelations

- Get Paid (feat. EBone Hoodrich)

=== 2013 ===
The Game

- Last Supper (feat. Jadakiss, Styles P & AR-16)

Jaheim - Appreciation Day

- I Found You

Kirko Bangz - Progression III

- For My Niggas

(Co-produced with Trakksounds and Albie Dickson)

Doe B - Baby Jesus

- God Flow

Young Buck - Strictly 4 Traps N Trunks 44 Free Young Buck edition

- Compare Me

(Co-produced with Chinky P)

Loaded Lux - You Gon' Get This Work

- Millionaire Dollar Dreaming
- Jammin
- Takes 2

Black Rob

- About Me

I-20 - The Amphetamine Manifesto 2

- Lose My Cool
- Live It Up (feat. Fiend)
- Southern Charm
- We Deserve To Shine

Adrian Marcel - 7 Days of Weak

- Raphael Saadiq Intro

Mysonne - Coast 2 Coast 236

- Came From Nothing (feat. Chi Ali & Nathaniel)

Winners Circle - Winners Circle

- Runner Up (feat. Nipsey Hussle)
- Day in the Life

Doughboy, Jibbs, Huey, Tef Poe, Trixie & Vega

- 100 Remix

Masspike Miles - Skky Miles 3 #BlocksNBedrooms - Pt. 1. #Bedrooms

- Whispering Tears

Euroz

- Purple Clouds

=== 2014 ===
Slaughterhouse - House Rules

- Offshore

Lil Bibby - Free Crack 2

- We Are Strong (feat. Kevin Gates)

Joe Budden

- Nothing Changed (feat. Tsu Surf & Ransom)

Some Love Lost

- Alive (feat. Emanny)

Ransom - True To The Game Pt. 5 : The Duffle Bag Edition

- Vietnam (feat. Joe Budden)

Starlito - Theories

- G. Thomas (1991-2013) (feat. Don Trip)

D Lux - No Filters : Chapter 1

- Bomb Bomb (feat. Ace Hood)

(Co-produced with Traxx Sanders)

- She Bout Her Money (feat. Paul Wall)
- She's A Model (feat. John Brown)
- Tryna See You (feat. Project Pat)
- Work It
- Juke It (feat. Mistah F.A.B.)
- I Found You

2 Pistols - Comin Back Hard

- Lingo (feat. OJ da Juiceman)

Young Buck - Strictly 4 Traps N Trunks 82

- Strapped (feat. Highside)

Sole & DJ Pain 1 - Death Drive (full album)

- 1. Death Drive
- 2. The Gauntlet
- 3. Don't Riot
- 4. Baghdad Shake
- 5. War (feat. Decomposure)
- 6. The Janitor's Son (feat. Pedestrian)
- 7. Rap Game Darwin
- 8. Coal (feat. Decomposure)
- 9. Hey Liberals (feat. Jesse Lester)
- 10. Y.D.E.L.O.
- 11. Old Gods Ain't Dead (feat. Sean Bonnette)
- 12. Unscorch the Earth
- 13. The Teachings of Cube

Chuck D - The Black In Man

- Give We The Pride (feat. Mavis Staples)
- Ican (feat. PE 2.0)

Frenchie - Fukk Fame

- Birds & Keys (feat. Trae Tha Truth)

PE 2.0 - People Get Ready

- People Get Ready (feat. Chuck D)

=== 2015 ===
Ludacris - Ludaversal (Deluxe)

- Money (feat. Rick Ross)

G Herbo aka Lil Herb - Ballin Like I'm Kobe (Deluxe)

- Countin' 100s

Gunplay - Living Legend

- Leave Da Game (feat. Masspike Miles)

Do or Die - Picture This II

- Expensive Love (feat. Twista)

Shawty Lo

- This & That

Nutso - Divided Soul

- Hustler's Spirit (feat. Trae tha Truth)

Sharaya J

- No Filter

Emilio Rojas

- All I Know (feat. Hi-Rez)

L.I.F.E.

- This Can't Be Life

Starlito - I'm Moving to Houston

- Cashville to Memphis to Houston (feat. Young Dolph & Killa Kyleon)
- Number 1/Like Penny (feat. Dee-1)

Rayven Justice - The Cassette Playlist

- I Like (feat. Bizzy Crook)

(Co-produced with Bizness Boi)

PE 2.0 - InsPirEd

- Black Thesis (feat. KRS-One)
- Survival

Kutt Calhoun - Kuttin Loose

- Handz Up (Shut Shit Down) (feat. Wanz)

=== 2016 ===
Royce da 5'9"- Trust the Shooter

- Trust the Shooter (feat. Smoke DZA)
- Universe (Interlude)

Layers

- Dope! (feat. Loren W. Oden)

Ted Park

- Varsity (feat. OG Maco & Wave Chapelle)
- Hello, Who Is This?

Grafh - Pain Killers Reloaded

- Active (feat. Bun B)

Sole & DJ Pain 1 - Nihilismo (full album)

- 1. Generation Fucked (feat. Church Fire)
- 2. Too Small to Fail
- 3. Capitalism Is Tearing Us Apart (feat. Decomposure)
- 4. Flood
- 5. Extinction Event
- 6. Hostage Crisis (feat. Chris Hannah of Propagandhi & Scott Crow)
- 7. National Bird
- 8. My Brand
- 9. Self Destruct (feat. The Delta Mirror)
- 10. Walk The Plank (feat. Jah Boogie)
- 11. Exodus (feat. Ceschi)
- 12. Our Words
- 13. Battle Of Humans

DJ Omoney

- Weirdo (feat. Kevin Gates & T.Rone)

Ye Ali

- Wet 2x (feat. Dougie F)

Kutt Calhoun

- Alive (feat. The Jokerr)
- King Kutt

Balize - Under the Mattress

- Shower (feat. Nipsey Hussle)

(Co-produced with Superstaarbeats)

=== 2017 ===
Public Enemy - Nothing Is Quick in the Desert

- Nothing is Quick in the Desert
- So Be it (feat. Jahi)

Driicky Graham

- Tabs

Ted Park

- No Go (feat. Okasian)

(Co-produced with Memory and Stacktrace)

Sole & DJ Pain 1 - No God Nor Country (full album)

- 1. F.T.L.
- 2. Extremist
- 3. Outsiders
- 4. The World Ain't Yours
- 5. Wrong Side Of The Law
- 6. Enough (feat. Decomposure)
- 7. D.T.A.
- 8. Godless (feat. Decomposure)
- 9. Karma Police II
- 10. Be Free (feat. Ted Park)
- 11. Company Time
- 12. Born In The Storm
- 13. Not Here

Brian Angel - Daybreak : Tha Appetizer

- One Time (feat. Chedda Da Connect)
- Competition

Rebstar - dont stress Me

- 1. Almost Forgot
- 2. Thriller
- 3. Bella (feat. Naked People)
- 4. dont stress Me
- 5. Hahaha
- 6. Alright Alright Alright Alright (feat. Baby Mike)
- 7. 365

(Co-produced with Rebstar and RuzBeatz)

- 8. Hello Kitty (feat. LE SINNER)
- 13. My Little Sister

=== 2018 ===
Stevie Stone & JL - Kontra-Band

- Not One of Them (feat. Tech N9ne)

Rae Sremmurd - SR3MM

- Growed Up

(Co-produced with Marz and Mike Will Made It)

Ted Park - Plugged In

- Hands in the Air (feat. Jay Park)
- Corny (feat. Dumbfoundead)

La Même Gang - La Même Tape : Linksters

- Know Me (feat. Sarkodie)

Wendy's

- 4 for $4

(Co-produced with Vizion)

L2B Gang

- Qui nous l'empêche

Horseshoe G.A.N.G. - Ghetto CARtunes

- House Keys
- Lyrical Gang Bang Life

Epic Beard Men - Season 1

- Not Ur Uber

(Provided Scratches)

Hayce Lemsi - La Haute

- Dolce Narco (feat. Lefa)

(Co-produced with Majestic Drama)

=== 2019 ===
Polo G

- In The Game

Wiz Khalifa - Fly Times Vol. 1 : The Good Fly Young

- Taylor Life (feat. Sosamann)

(Co-produced with Statik Selektah, Dreamlife and Stacktrace)

Sammie - Everlasting

- Times 10 (feat. Lil Baby)

Stevie Stone - Set in Stone I

- Flip Mode (feat. Tech N9ne)

Bun B & Statik Selektah - TrillStatik

- Concrete (feat. Westside Gunn & Termanology)

(Co-produced with Statik Selektah and Dreamlife)

Ted Park - They Don’t Know

- On My Way
- Ugly

(Co-produced with Sheory and Stacktrace)

- Drippin' (feat. Jessi)

Jarren Benton - The Bully Freestyles

- Enter Sandman

Nino Man - Juu Hurd

- My Side (feat. Jim Jones)

Dee-1 - God and Girls

- Put Me In Coach

Compound

- All I'm Talkin (feat. Jim Jones)

Astronomy Club : The Sketch Show (Netflix Original)

- Theme Song (feat. Grand Puba)

=== 2020 ===
Statik Selektah - The Balancing Act

- Keep it Moving (feat. Nas, Joey Badass) & Gary Clark Jr.

(Co-produced with Statik Selektah & Vintage Vxndals)

- Time (feat. Jack Harlow)

(Co-produced with Statik Selektah & Vintage Vxndals)

Russ - Shake the Snow Globe (Deluxe)

- You Coulda Left Me Alone

(Co-produced with Vintage Vxndals)

Ari Lennox

- Chocolate Pomegranate

(Co-produced with Elite, and the Vintage Vxndals)

The Lox - Living Off Xperience

- Come Back

(Co-produced with Statik Selektah, Dreamlife, Memory and Stacktrace)

Public Enemy - What You Gonna Do When the Grid Goes Down?

- Go At It

Maino - Die a Legend

- Still Here

SiAngie Twins - Good Girls Gone Bad

- Never Be Me

Cipha Da Lyrical - Cold Blooded

- Cold Blooded (Intro)
- Serious (feat. Thrax the Upmost & Young Act) (Co-produced with Dreamlife)
- Ave Legend (Co-produced with Dreamlife)
- Progression (feat. Chef Trez & Aplu$)
- The Hood Know (feat. J-Hood & GS Vague) (Co-produced with Mr IBTU)
- So Lost (feat. Tina Jean)
- Too Close (Co-produced with Prodlem)
- Tonight (Co-produced with Dylan Graham)

Orlando Brown

- Blue Mythology

CJ Fly - RUDEBWOY

- Show You

(Co-produced with Statik Selektah, Dreamlife, Memory and Stacktrace)

- City We From (feat. Conway The Machine)

(Co-produced with Statik Selektah, Dreamlife, Memory and Stacktrace)

=== 2021 ===
Pooh Shiesty - Shiesty Season (Deluxe)

- Switch It Up (feat. G Herbo, No More Heroes)

(Co-produced with Gold Haze & JD Feng)

KXNG Crooked & Canibus

- Aluminum Oxide

Nia Sultana

- Ambience (With PK Beatz & Neil Dominique)

Orlando Brown (actor)

- Smiled On Me

=== 2022 ===
Joey Badass

- Head High

(Co-produced with Statik Selektah and Dreamlife)

Mistah F.A.B. - Black Designer

- André Leon Talley (feat. Rick Ross)

Crooked I and Joell Ortiz - Rise & Fall of Slaughter House

- Fukglasshouse
- Coastin' (Featuring Traxx Sanders, Co-produced by Dreamlife)

Krayzie Bone, RA The Rugged Man, A-F-R-O, and Timbo King

- Now or Never

Meechy Darko Ft. Kirk Knight, Vita

- Cursed

GANG51E JUNE

- Liliana's Interlude (Co-produced by Honorable C.N.O.T.E., M80 and Vintage Vxndals)

Joey Fatts Ft. Blxst

- Floor Seats

Lah Pat

- Rodeo (AKA Pony)

=== 2023 ===
Lah Pat

- Rodeo (Remix) ft. Flo Milli

Baby Drill

- How Ya Doin? (Co-produced by ATL Jacob, Hendrix, and Dreamlife)

Paul Wall & Termanology

- Palm Trees ft. AZ and Solene
- Positive Vibes ft. Tony Sunshine
- No Apologies ft. Bun B
- Real Life

Ouija Macc

- They Don't Like Me
