= My Baby (Kállay Saunders song) =

Single by András Kállay-Saunders

from the album UNTITLED
- Released: 20 December 2012
- Genre: Pop
- Length: 2:59
- Label: Today Is Vintage
- Songwriter(s): Ándras Kállay-Saunders, Leslie Tay
- Producer(s): Ándras Kállay-Saunders, Krisztián Burai, Ernő Bodóczki, Leslie Tay, John Alexis

András Kállay-Saunders singles chronology
"Tonight" (2012)	"My Baby" (2012)	"Play My Song (feat. Rebstar)" (2013)

"My Baby" is a single by Hungarian artist Kállay Saunders. It was released as a single 8 August 2012 for digital download in the Hungary. My Baby was a top contender for the Hungarian Eurovision A Dal qualifiers.

== Music video ==
A music video to accompany the release of "My Baby" was first released digitally on 8 February 2013 at a total length of two minutes and fifty nine seconds.

== Eurovision A Dal ==
My Baby was a top contender for Hungary in the Eurovision Song Contest 2013, ending up as the runner-up in the Hungarian qualifiers.

== Chart performance ==
"My Baby" debuted at number 3 on the Hungarian charts on 4 November 2012. The song peaked the MAHASZ Top 40 Radio Charts at number one.

=== Weekly charts ===
Chart (2014)	Peak position
Hungary (Rádiós Top 40)	1
Hungary (Single Top 40)	1

=== Year-end charts ===
Chart (2012)	Peak position
Hungary Radio Top 100	2

== Track listings ==
Digital download

1. "My Baby" – 2:59

== Credits and personnel ==
- Vocals – Kállay Saunders,
- Producer – Krisztián Burai, Ernő Bodóczki, Leslie Tay, John Alexis
- Lyrics – Kállay Saunders, Leslie Tay
- Label: Today Is Vintage

== Release history ==
Country	Date	Format	Label
Hungary	20 December 2012	Digital download	Today Is Vintage
