= Megan Callahan-Shah =

American television writer

Megan Callahan-Shah (born February 1985) is an American television writer known for her work on Saturday Night Live.

Callahan-Shah was born in Illinois to Paul and Jane Callahan in Downers Grove, Illinois. She graduated from Benet Academy in 2003. She attended NYU Tisch School of the Arts, graduating in 2008 with a Bachelor of Fine Arts. She has written for Weekend Update since 2015, becoming head writer in 2023.

== Awards and nominations ==
Callahan has been nominated for several Emmy awards, winning her first Emmy in 2025. She received a 2017 Peabody Award for Political Satire and a 2018 Writers Guild Award for best Comedy/Variety Sketch Series.

Awards and nominations received by Megan Callahan-Shah
Award	Year	Category	Nominated work	Result	Ref
Primetime Emmy Awards	2016	Outstanding Writing for a Variety Series	Saturday Night Live	Nominated	
Primetime Emmy Awards	2017	Outstanding Writing for a Variety Series	Saturday Night Live	Nominated	
Primetime Emmy Awards	2018	Outstanding Writing for a Variety Series	Saturday Night Live	Nominated	
Primetime Emmy Awards	2019	Outstanding Writing for a Variety Series	Saturday Night Live	Nominated	
Primetime Emmy Awards	2021	Outstanding Writing for a Variety Series	Saturday Night Live	Nominated	
Primetime Emmy Awards	2022	Outstanding Writing for a Variety Series	Saturday Night Live	Nominated	
Primetime Emmy Awards	2023	Outstanding Writing for a Variety Series	Saturday Night Live	Nominated	
Primetime Emmy Awards	2024	Outstanding Writing for a Variety Series	Saturday Night Live	Nominated	
Primetime Emmy Awards	2025	Outstanding Writing for a Variety Series	Saturday Night Live	Nominated	
Primetime Emmy Awards	2025	Outstanding Writing for a Variety Special	Saturday Night Live 50th Anniversary Special	Won	

== Personal life ==
Callahan-Shah is married to Swedish music executive Rebstar, whose albums sideWAYS and Rosengård she executive produced. They have one child.
