= Rebstar =

Swedish singer (born 1988)

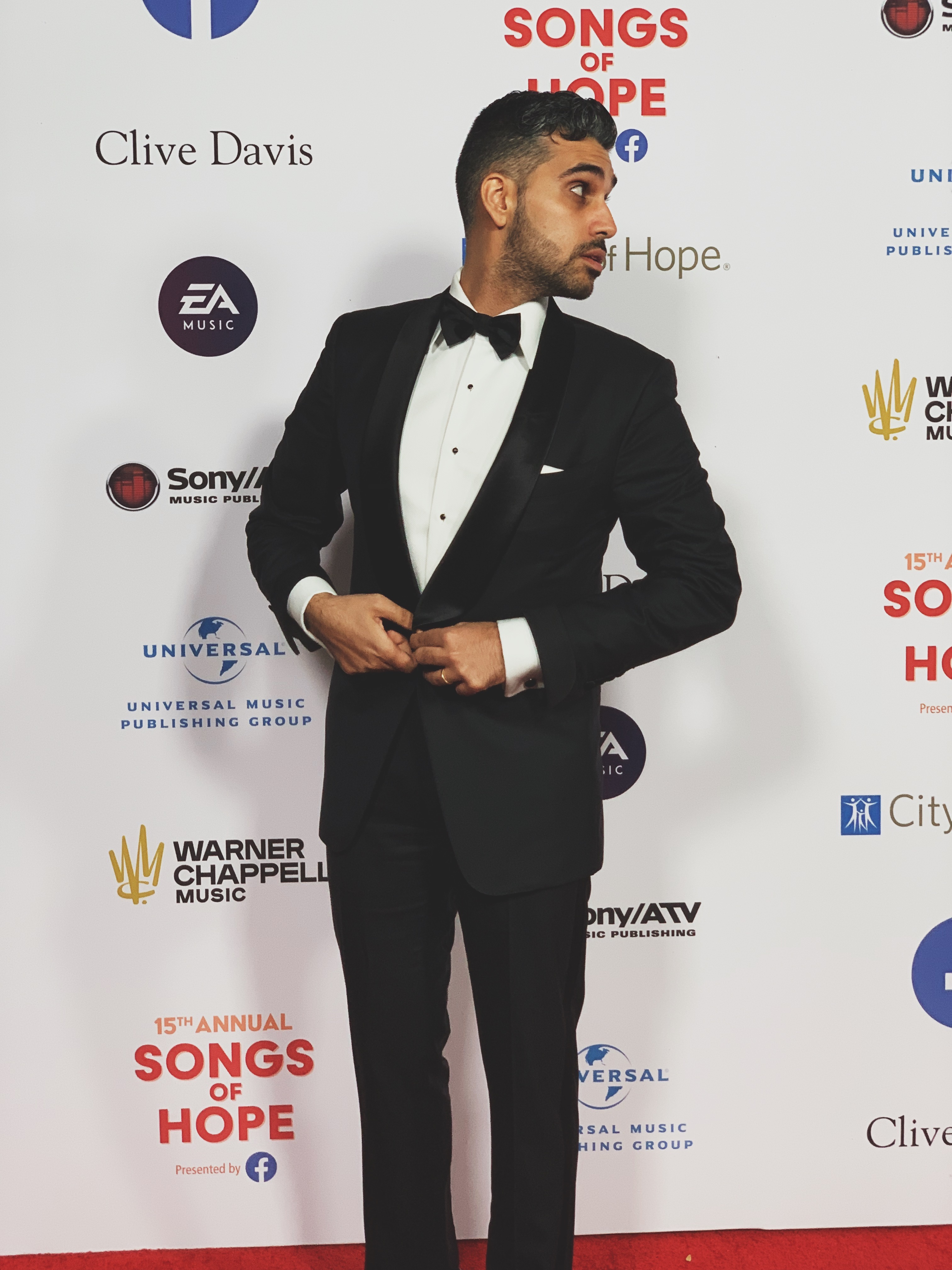
- Rebstar at the 2019 Songs of Hope

Background information
- Born: Rebin Shah; October 4, 1988 (age 38); Malmö, Sweden
- Genres: Hip hop; pop; R&B
- Occupations: Music executive; recording artist; songwriter; producer
- Years active: 2008–present
- Label: Today Is Vintage
- Website: todayisvintage.com

Rebin Shah (born 4 October 1988), known professionally as Rebstar, is a Swedish music executive, recording artist and entrepreneur. He is the founder of the entertainment company Today Is Vintage and Creative Director for the World Childhood Foundation, founded by Queen Silvia.

Shah and Today Is Vintage have been described as leading Sweden’s hip hop export, referring to their rise as part of a “Swedish invasion.”

== Early life ==
Rebin Shah was born in Malmö, Sweden, on 4 October 1988. He is the only child of a Persian mother and a Kurdish father and grew up in the district of Rosengård. He attended an international elementary school and later moved to Scotland to study law at the University of Aberdeen, before returning to Sweden to pursue a career in music.

== Music career ==
=== 2008–2011: Early career ===
Rebstar began releasing music in late 2008 with his debut single “Without You,” produced by T-Minus and featuring Trey Songz. The track received national radio play in Sweden. In the same year, he founded the independent label 2fresh Records, which released his early material and collaborations.

His debut mixtape, Arrival, was released on 4 October 2010, followed by Arrival 2.0 on 3 May 2011. In 2011, an unreleased track titled “Good Life,” produced by Boi-1da and featuring Drake and Rock City, surfaced.

=== 2012-2013: Bad Karma and Today Is Vintage ===
In March 2012, Rebstar released the mixtape Bad Karma. Later that year, he was featured on Kállay Saunders’ single Tonight, which charted in Hungary.

Shah founded Today Is Vintage in 2012, initially as an independent record label. Saunders became the label’s first signing and released the single "My Baby" through the imprint later that year.

In 2013, Shah partnered with Studieförbundet Vuxenskolan to launch Vintage Initiativet, a nonprofit program supporting young musicians in Malmö. That same year, he appeared on Saunders’ single “Play My Song.”

=== 2014–2016: You Know Nothing About Love and Girls Like Nicole ===
In 2014, Rebstar released the single “Safe Safe (040 Zlatan Mix),” referencing Swedish footballer Zlatan Ibrahimović.

He continued releasing music throughout 2015, including “Thing About You” and “Reputation.” His EP You Know Nothing About Love was released in November 2015, followed by the album Girls Like Nicole in June 2016. During this period, Shah also began developing Gambian artist Saint, who later signed to Today Is Vintage.

=== 2017: The Swedish Invasion and Don't Stress Me ===
In 2016, Today Is Vintage signed Swedish artist LE SINNER, whose debut single “Paris” reached No. 1 on Spotify’s Viral Charts in the United States. In September 2017, Rebstar released the single “Don’t Stress Me.”

=== 2019: Rosengård ===
Rebstar released his third album, "Rosengård", in April 2019. The album’s title refers to the Malmö district where Shah grew up and features a childhood photograph of him on the cover. It was executive produced by Megan Callahan, whom Shah married later that year.

== Executive career ==
Shah founded Today Is Vintage in 2012 as an independent record label before expanding it into an entertainment company spanning music, publishing, artist management, and later film and television. The company initially developed artists in Sweden before broadening its operations internationally.

In 2018, Shah relocated Today Is Vintage’s headquarters to New York City, establishing the company’s presence in the United States and expanding its work with artists, producers, and partners across the music and media industries.

In 2020, Shah launched The Cloud Sessions, an international music collaboration program connecting artists and producers from Sweden and the United States. The project has been produced in partnership with Export Music Sweden, the Embassy of Sweden in Washington, D.C., and the Clive Davis Institute at New York University.

In 2025, Shah co-founded Today Is Vintage Pictures, the company’s film and television division, which develops original scripted projects.

In addition to his work with Today Is Vintage, Shah has served as a pro bono Creative Director of the World Childhood Foundation, contributing to the organization’s creative strategy and communications.

In 2026, Today Is Vintage entered into a joint venture with Atlantic Music Group.

== Personal life ==
Shah is married to writer Megan Callahan-Shah, a writer for Saturday Night Live. The couple married in June 2019.

== Discography ==
=== Mixtapes ===
- Arrival (2010)
- Arrival 2.0 (2011)
- Bad Karma (2012)

=== EP ===
- You Know Nothing About Love (2015)
- sideWAYS (2018)

=== Album ===
- Girls Like Nicole (2016)
- dont stress Me (2017)
- Rosengård (2019)

=== Singles ===
- "Without You" feat. Trey Songz (2009)
- "All Night" feat. Kállay Saunders (2013)
- "Safe Safe" (2014)
- "Thing About You" (2015)
- "Reputation" (2015)
- "Haii" (2017)
- "Hello Kitty" feat. LE SINNER (2017)
- "Promises" (2018)
- "EMERGENCY" (2019)
- "Somebody Named Frank" (2019)

=== Collaborations ===
- "See Me, Hear Me, Feel Me, Touch Me" by Gravitonas feat. Rebstar (2012)
- "Break Me Up" by Gravitonas feat. Rebstar (2012)
- "Tonight" by Kállay Saunders feat. Rebstar (2012)
- "Play My Song" by Kállay Saunders feat. Rebstar (2013)
- "Safe Safe 040 Mix" by Rebstar feat. Saint, Lilleman, Lazee & The C.I.T.Y. (2014)
