= Le Sinner =

Swedish singer (born 1997)

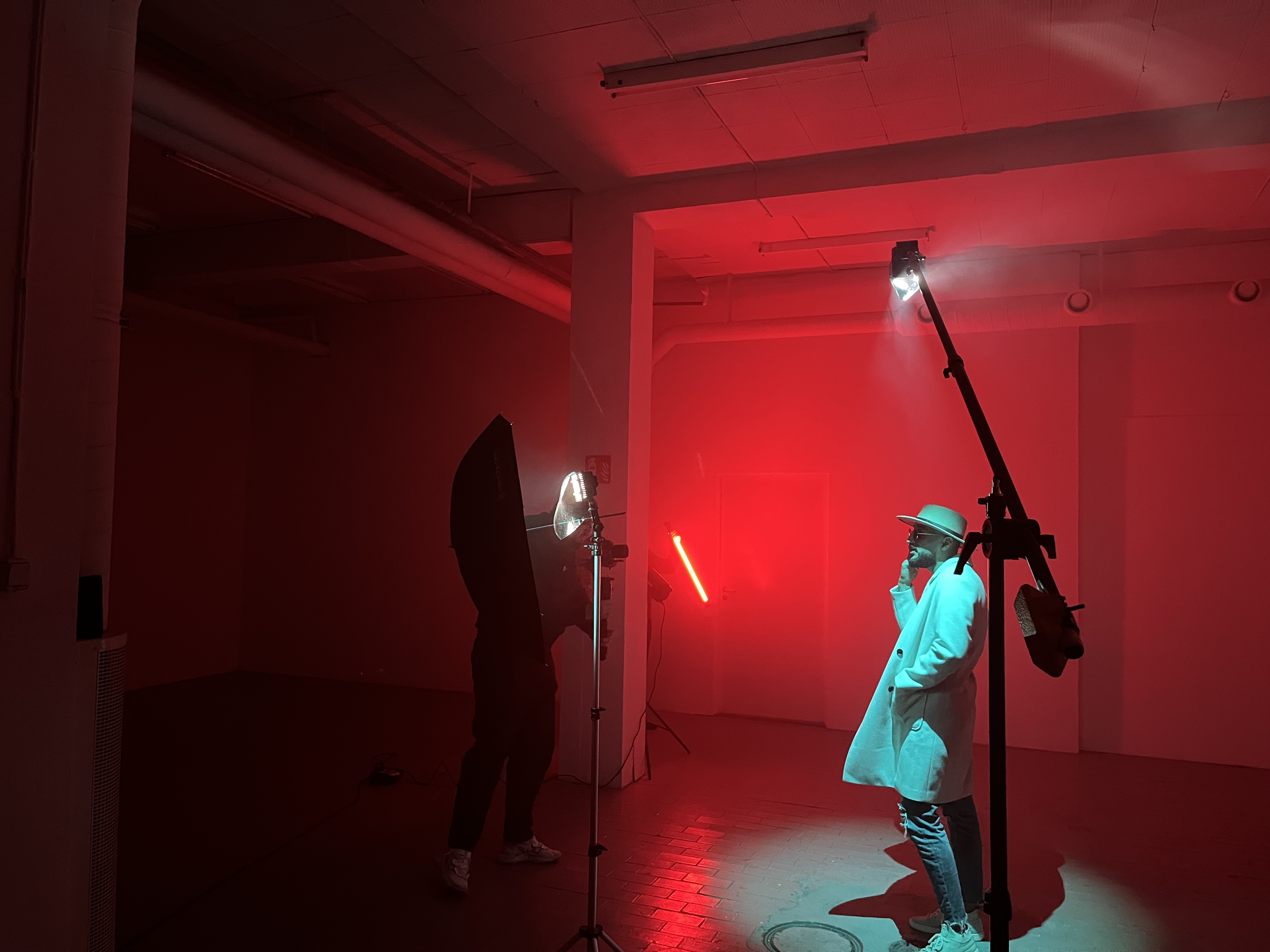
- Le Sinner at a video shoot in Malmö, Sweden.

Background information
- Born: Sina Tayefi; 19 June 1997 (age 28)
- Origin: Malmö
- Genres: R&B, hip hop
- Occupations: singer; songwriter; rapper
- Instrument: Vocals
- Years active: 2017–present
- Labels: Independent
- Website: lesinner.com

Sina Tayefi (born 19 June 1997), known professionally as Le Sinner, is a Persian singer, songwriter and rapper from Malmö, Sweden.

In 2017, Le Sinner received global recognition with his debut single "Paris" after peaking No. 1 on Spotify's Viral 50 in USA and co-signs by the likes of DJ Snake.

== Early life ==
Sina Tayefi was born to Persian parents in Tehran, Iran. He moved with his family to Malmö, Sweden in 2009. Tayefi studied fashion design at Drottning Blankas Gymnasium in Malmö, Sweden. During high school, Tayefi frequented a recreational youth center with a recording studio in Malmö. After graduating from high school, at age of 19 he started working on his music professionally and released his first ever single.

== Career ==
In December 2016, Tayefi signed a record deal with Swedish record label Today Is Vintage. His debut single "Paris" was released on 13 January 2017. Two weeks after its release, "Paris" peaked No. 1 on Spotify Viral 50 Charts in USA and No. 21 on the equivalent Global Chart. "Paris" accumulated over 4 million streams and has been certified Gold in Sweden. At the time, very little was known of the rising newcomer who had abstained from doing press.

In May 2017, Tayefi graced the cover story of Swedish newspaper Sydsvenskan for his first exclusive interview.

On 30 June 2017, Le Sinner followed up with his second single "Long Long Time". On 20 October, Le Sinner released his third single "Bad Habit" and announced his EP is on the way.

On 17 November, Le Sinner released his EP A Perfect Murder.

== Discography ==
=== Albums ===
- A Perfect Murder (EP) (2017)

=== Singles ===
- "Paris" (2017)
- "Long Long Time" (2017)
- "Bad Habit" feat. salute (2017)
- "No Warning" (2019)
- "Mama Said I Deserve Better Fuck What She Thinks" (2021)
- "6 New Messages" (2022)

=== Collaborations ===
- "Unreal" by GZ feat. Le Sinner (2017)
