= Today Is Vintage =

Entertainment company

- Type: Private
- Industry: Entertainment
- Founded: 2012; 14 years ago
- Founder: Rebstar
- Headquarters: New York City
- Area served: Worldwide
- Website: todayisvintage.com

Today Is Vintage is an entertainment company founded in 2012 in Malmö, Sweden, by Rebin Shah, known professionally as Rebstar.

The company operates across recorded music, publishing, artist management, and film and television development. In 2019, Today Is Vintage relocated its headquarters to New York City as part of its expansion into the United States and international markets.

== History ==
Today Is Vintage was founded in 2012 by Rebin Shah, known professionally as Rebstar, as an independent record label based in Malmö, Sweden. Its first signing was American–Hungarian artist Kállay Saunders, whose single "My Baby”reached No. 1 on the Hungarian Singles Chart following its release through the label.

Throughout the 2010s, the company developed artists and producers across pop, hip hop, R&B, and alternative music. In 2019, Today Is Vintage moved its headquarters to New York City to support its growing activities in music, publishing, and management in the North America. Around this period, the company began working with producer T-Minus.

Since 2021, Today Is Vintage has produced The Cloud Sessions, an international virtual music collaboration program created in partnership with Export Music Sweden, the Embassy of Sweden in Washington, D.C., and the Clive Davis Institute at NYU. The program connects emerging artists and producers from Sweden and the United States through a series of online writing and production sessions.

In 2025, the company launched Today Is Vintage Pictures, a film and television development arm co-founded by Shah and writer Megan Callahan-Shah, expanding the company’s work into scripted and unscripted content.

In 2026, Today Is Vintage entered into a joint venture with Atlantic Music Group.

Today, the company works across recorded music, publishing, talent management, and film and television development, collaborating with artists, producers, and writers in Europe and the United States.

== See also ==
- Rebstar
- Megan Callahan-Shah
