= Hungary in the Eurovision Song Contest 2016 =

- Eurovision Song Contest 2016
- Country: Hungary
- Selection process: A Dal 2016
- Selection date: 27 February 2016

Competing entry
- Song: "Pioneer"
- Artist: Freddie
- Songwriters: Zé Szabó; Borbála Csarnai

Placement
- Semi-final result: Qualified (4th, 197 points)
- Final result: 19th, 108 points

Participation chronology

Hungary was represented at the Eurovision Song Contest 2016 with the song "Pioneer" written by Zé Szabó and Borbála Csarnai. The song was performed by Freddie. The Hungarian entry for the 2016 contest in Stockholm, Sweden was selected through the national final A Dal 2016, organised by the local Media Services and Support Trust Fund (MTVA) and the Hungarian public broadcaster Duna Media Service. An initial 30 entries competed in the national final which consisted of six shows: three heats, two semi-final and a final. Entries were selected to advance in the competition based on the votes of a four-member judging panel as well as the votes from the public. Eight entries qualified to compete in the final of A Dal 2016 where the judging panel first selected four of the entries to proceed to a second round of voting. In the second round of voting, "Pioneer" performed by Freddie was selected as the winner based entirely on a public vote.

Hungary was drawn to compete in the first semi-final of the Eurovision Song Contest which took place on 10 May 2016. Performing during the show in position 4, "Pioneer" was announced among the top 10 entries of the first semi-final and therefore qualified to compete in the final on 14 May. It was later revealed that Hungary placed fourth out of the 18 participating countries in the semi-final with 197 points. In the final, Hungary performed in position 5 and placed nineteenth out of the 26 participating countries, scoring 108 points.

== Background ==
Prior to the 2016 contest, Hungary had participated in the Eurovision Song Contest thirteen times since their first entry in 1994. Hungary's best placing in the contest was fourth, which they achieved with their début entry in 1994 with the song "Kinek mondjam el vétkeimet?" performed by Friderika Bayer. Hungary had attempted participate in the contest in 1993, however, their entry was eliminated in the preselection show Kvalifikacija za Millstreet. Hungary withdrew from the contest for six years between 1999 and 2004 and also missed the 2006 and 2010 contests. In 2014, Hungary achieved their second best result in the contest since their début, placing fifth with the song "Running" performed by András Kállay-Saunders. In 2015, Hungary placed 20th in the Eurovision final with the song "Wars for Nothing" performed by Boggie.

The Hungarian national broadcaster, Media Services and Support Trust Fund (MTVA), broadcasts the event within Hungary and organises the selection process for the nation's entry. MTVA confirmed their intentions to participate at the 2016 Eurovision Song Contest on 19 October 2015. Since 2012, MTVA has organised A Dal, a national selection show which has managed to, thus far, produce entries that have qualified the nation to the final of the Eurovision Song Contest each year and has resulted in two top 10 placings in 2013 and 2014. The Hungarian broadcaster continued selecting their entry through this process for 2016 with details regarding the organization of the A Dal 2016 national final being released along with their participation confirmation.

== Before Eurovision ==
=== A Dal 2016 ===
A Dal 2016 was the fifth edition of A Dal which selected the Hungarian entry for the Eurovision Song Contest 2016. Thirty entries competed in the competition that consisted of six shows which commenced on 23 January 2016 and concluded with an eight-song final on 27 February 2016. All shows in the competition were broadcast on Duna, Duna World and online at mediaklikk.hu/adal. The final was also broadcast at the official Eurovision Song Contest website eurovision.tv.

==== Format ====
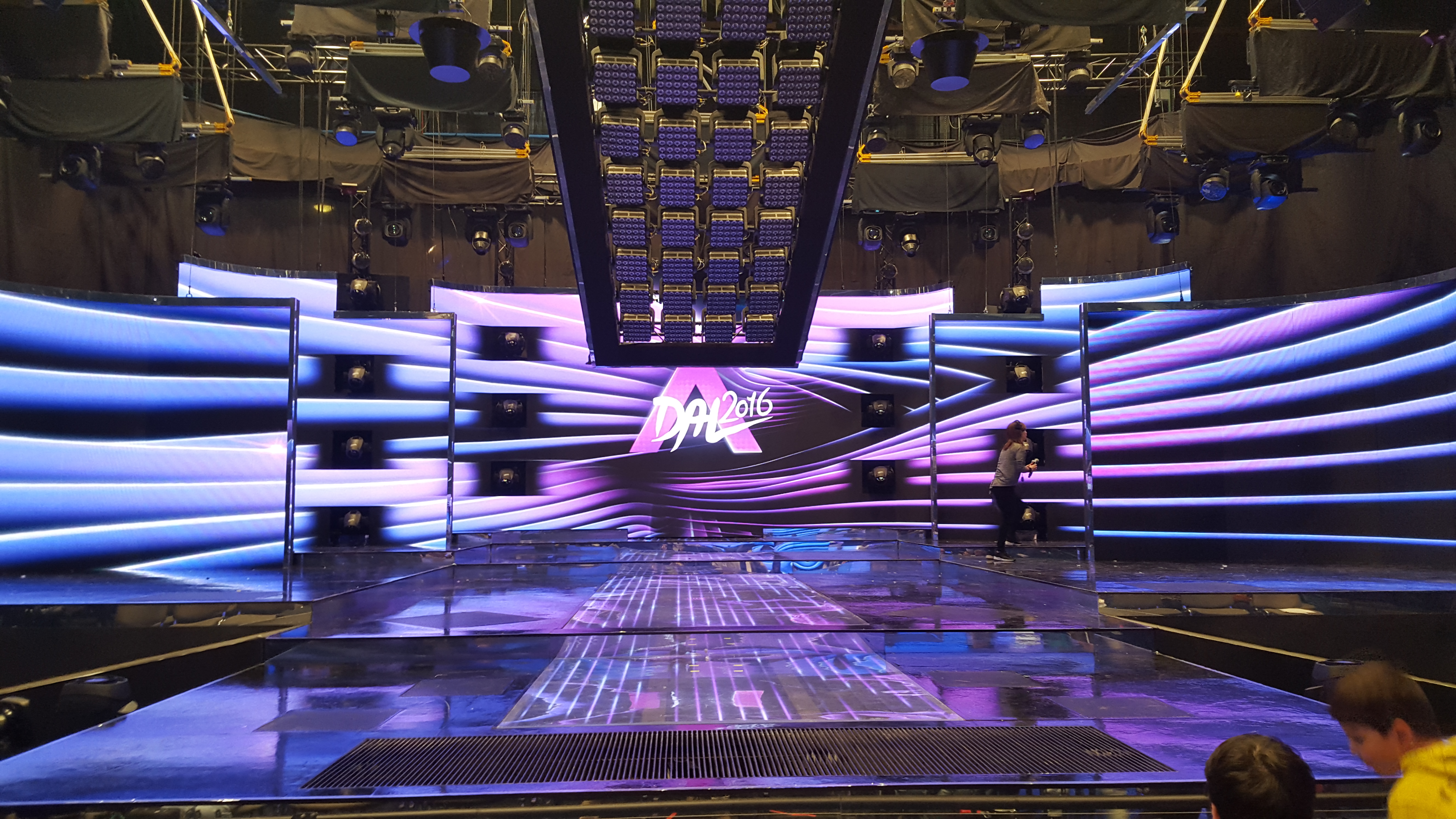
The studio of A Dal 2016 in the MTVA headquarters building

The format of the competition consisted of six shows: three heats, two semi-finals and a final. The six shows took place at MTVA Studio 1 in Budapest and were hosted by Csilla Tatár and Levente Harsányi. The three heats, held on 23 January 2016, 30 January 2016 and 6 February 2016, each featured ten entries with six advancing to the semi-finals from each show. The semi-finals, held on 13 and 20 February 2016, each featured nine entries with four advancing to the final from each show. The final, held on 27 February 2016, selected the Hungarian entry for Stockholm from the eight remaining entries.

===== Voting =====
Results during each show were determined by each member of the four-member judging panel and votes from the public. During the heats and the semi-finals, two rounds of voting determined which entries advanced to the next stages of the competition. In the first round of voting, each judge assigned scores to each entry ranging from 1 (lowest score) to 10 (highest score) immediately after the artist(s) conclude their performance. The public acted as the fifth juror and also assigned one aggregate score between 1 and 10 by either submitting their score via an SMS, voting through a mobile app specifically designed for the competition, or voting online through the show's official website. The summation of the judges scores and the aggregate score from the public vote determined the final scores for the first round. In the heats, the top five entries with the highest scores advanced to the semi-finals. In the semi-finals, the top three entries with the highest scores advanced to the final in the first round of voting. In the case of a tie among the entries in the first round of voting, the judging panel would deliberate and determine which entries would advance. In the second round of voting, the remaining entries that did not qualify during the first round faced an additional public vote where the single entry that received the most votes from each heat and semi-final would also advance further in the competition. In the case of a tie during the second round of voting, the entry which received a higher score during the first round of voting would advance and should a tie still persist, the judging panel would deliberate and determine which entry advanced.

In the final, the eight remaining entries also faced two rounds of voting. In the first round, the judges assigned points to their four preferred entries: 4 (lowest), 6, 8 and 10 (highest). The top four entries determined by the judges qualified to the second round of voting. In the second round, a public vote exclusively determined the winning entry.

===== Judges =====
The A Dal 2016 judges

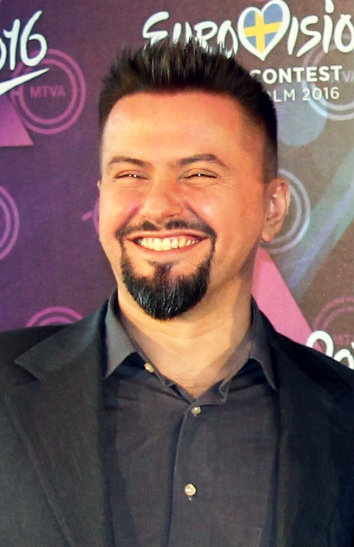
Pierrot

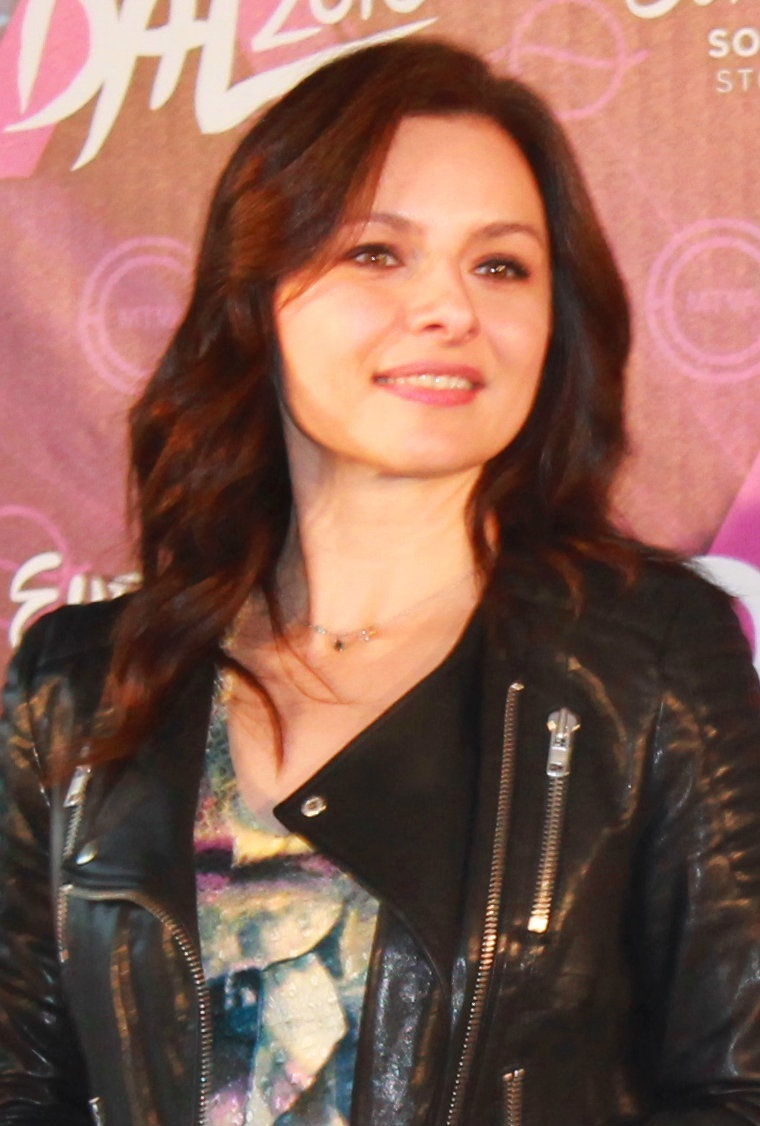
Zséda

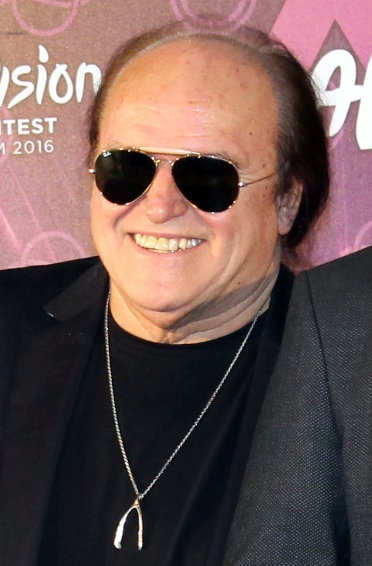
Károly Frenreisz

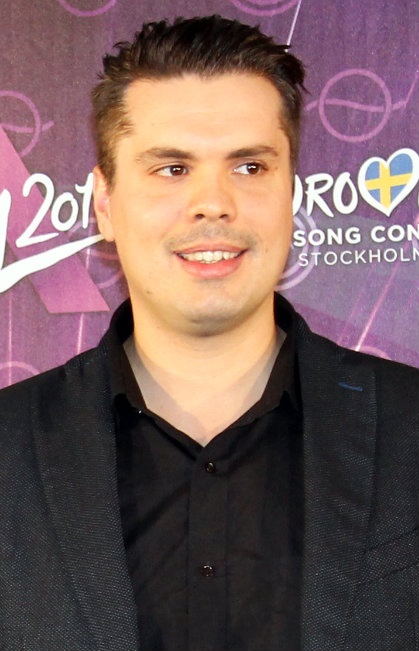
Miklós Both

The judging panel participated in each show by providing feedback to the competing artists and selecting entries to advance in the competition. The panel consisted of:

- Pierrot – Emerton award-winning composer, performer, songwriter and producer
- Zséda – Multiple Fonogram and Emerton award-winning performer and musician
- Károly Frenreisz – rock musician and composer
- Miklós Both – Fonogram and Budai award-winning performer and composer

==== Competing entries ====
Artists and composers were able to submit their applications and entries for the competition between 19 October 2015 and 25 November 2015. Competing artists were required to either hold Hungarian citizenship or be able to speak Hungarian fluently. In addition, only artists that had a valid contract with a record company/professional management and that had either released an album or have had national radio airplays or television appearances were eligible to compete. Artists were permitted to collaborate with international composers and submit songs in English and/or in a recognised minority language in Hungary, however, in such cases a translation of the lyrics to Hungarian were required. After the submission deadline had passed, 372 entries were received by the broadcaster.

A ten-member preselection jury selected thirty entries for the competition. The competing entries were announced during a press conference on 15 December 2015 held on the A38 multi-purpose ship in Budapest. Among the competing artists was former Eurovision Song Contest entrant András Kállay-Saunders (competing as Kállay Saunders Band), who represented Hungary in the 2014 contest.

The song "Reggeli Reggae", written by Miklós Heiczinger and Gergely András Nacsinák and to have been performed by Misztrál, was disqualified on 29 December 2015 as the song was presented before 1 September 2015, breaching the rules of the competition. "Katonák" by Viki Singh was announced as the replacement.

Artist	Song	Songwriter(s)
Szilvia Agárdi	"It Is Love"	Viktor Rakonczai, Tamara Olorga
B The First	"You Told Me You Loved Me"	Barna Pély, Máté Garai, Gergő Garai
Benji	"Kötéltánc"	Ferenc Vilmos Kolosai, Gyárfás Máté, Szabolcs Hujber
Olivér Berkes and Andi Tóth	"Seven Seas"	Ádám Kovacsics, Johnny K. Palmer
ByTheWay	"Free to Fly"	Bence Vavra, Péter Szikszai, Ferenc Feng Ya Ou, Norbert Szűcs
C.E.T.	"Free"	Balázs Molnár, Péter Novák, Martina Király
Egy Másik Zenekar	"Kéne közös kép"	Jenő Bartalos, Zoltán Takács
Freddie	"Pioneer"	Zé Szabó, Borbála Csarnai
Bálint Gájer	"Speed Bump"	Gyula Éliás, Johnny K. Palmer
Laci Gáspár	"Love and Bass"	Laci Gáspár, Péter Ferencz, Marcell Tóth, Tamás Orbán
Group'n'Swing	"Szeretni fáj"	Áron Romhányi, Tamás Orbán
Juli Horányi	"Come Along"	Júlia Horányi, Szabolcs Harmath
Ív	"Love Kills Me"	Lóránt Tóth
Kállay Saunders Band	"Who We Are"	András Kállay-Saunders, Márk Pacsai, Ádám Tóth
Karmapolis and Böbe Szécsi	"Hold On To"	András Kenyeres, Böbe Szécsi, Szabolcs Szipszer, Gábor Lipi, András Kenyeres
Maszkura és a tücsökraj and Siska Finuccsi	"Kinek sírjam"	Szabolcs Bíró, Gábor Boros, Attila Földesi, Csaba Kertész, Gyula Vadász, Szilveszter Losonczi
Misztrál	"Reggeli reggae"	Miklós Heiczinger, Gergely András Nacsinák
Fatima Mohamed	"Ott leszek"	Krisztián Burai, Fatima Mohamed, Krisztina Kotsy
Mushu	"Uncle Tom"	Izsák Palmer, Örs Kozák, Antal Kert
Nika	"Emlékkép"	Zé Szabó, Tamás Molnár
Odett	"Stardust"	Péter Polgár, Odett Polgár
Gergő Oláh	"Győz a jó"	Begi Lotfi, Gergő Oláh, Zsolt Szepesi, Tamás Molnár
Parno Graszt	"Már nem szédülök"	József Oláh
Passed	"Driftin'"	Levente Szabó, Dorottya Nizalowski, Fanni Nizalowski, Bálint Áron Farkas
Anna Patai	"Colors"	Norbert Szűcs, Péter Linka
Petruska	"Trouble in My Mind"	András Petruska
Viki Singh	"Katonák"	Viktor Fitos, Attila Valla
Reni Tolvai	"Fire"	Renáta Tolvai, Zsolt Szepesi, Todd Williams
Jázmin Török	"Power of Love"	Jázmin Török
André Vásáry	"Why"	Szabolcs Harmath, Johnny K. Palmer
Petra Veres-Kovács	"Singing Peace"	Tamás Subecz, Petra Veres-Kovács

==== Shows ====
===== Heats =====
Three heats took place on 23 January, 30 January and 6 February 2016. In each heat ten entries competed and six entries qualified to the semi-finals after two rounds of voting. In the first round of voting, five qualifiers were determined by the combination of scores from each judge and an aggregate score from a public SMS and mobile app vote. In the second round of voting, the remaining five entries that were not in the initial top five faced a public vote consisting of votes submitted through SMS in order to determine one additional qualifier.

In addition to the competing entries, other performers featured during the shows. Viktor Király performed in heat 1, the band Ocho Macho performed together with rapper Deniz in heat 2, and A Dal 2013 winner and the 2013 Hungarian Eurovision entrant ByeAlex and his band performed in heat 3.

Jury and public voting qualifier Public voting qualifier

Heat 1 – 23 January 2016
R/O	Artist	Song	Pierrot	Zséda	K. Frenreisz	M. Both	Viewers	Total	Result
1	Odett	"Stardust"	7	8	6	8	5	34	—N/a
2	Fatima Mohamed	"Ott leszek"	6	7	6	6	5	30	—N/a
3	ByTheWay	"Free to Fly"	6	8	7	5	5	31	Advanced
4	Mushu	"Uncle Tom"	7	8	7	8	6	36	Advanced
5	Jázmin Török	"Power of Love"	8	8	7	7	5	35	—N/a
6	Benji	"Kötéltánc"	7	9	8	9	6	39	Advanced
7	Egy Másik Zenekar	"Kéne közös kép"	4	10	7	9	6	36	Advanced
8	Petra Veres-Kovács	"Singing Peace"	5	7	6	7	7	32	—N/a
9	Freddie	"Pioneer"	9	9	9	7	8	42	Advanced
10	Reni Tolvai	"Fire"	5	10	7	7	6	35	Advanced

Heat 2 – 30 January 2016
R/O	Artist	Song	Pierrot	Zséda	K. Frenreisz	M. Both	Viewers	Total	Result
1	Passed	"Driftin'"	8	7	7	7	5	34	Advanced
2	Group'n'Swing	"Szeretni fáj"	5	8	6	7	5	31	—N/a
3	Anna Patai	"Colors"	6	8	7	6	5	32	—N/a
4	Maszkura és a tücsökraj and Siska Finuccsi	"Kinek sírjam"	5	8	6	9	4	32	—N/a
5	C.E.T.	"Free"	5	6	6	5	5	27	—N/a
6	Gergő Oláh	"Győz a jó"	7	10	8	8	6	39	Advanced
7	Laci Gáspár	"Love and Bass"	7	9	8	7	6	37	Advanced
8	André Vásáry	"Why"	9	9	8	7	6	39	Advanced
9	Karmapolis and Böbe Szécsi	"Hold On To"	8	8	6	8	6	36	Advanced
10	Kállay Saunders Band	"Who We Are"	8	9	9	7	8	41	Advanced

Heat 3 – 6 February 2016
R/O	Artist	Song	Pierrot	Zséda	K. Frenreisz	M. Both	Viewers	Total	Result
1	Nika	"Emlékkép"	6	9	7	7	5	34	Advanced
2	B The First	"You Told Me You Loved Me"	7	9	7	8	5	36	Advanced
3	Ív	"Love Kills Me"	8	7	7	6	5	33	—N/a
4	Bálint Gájer	"Speed Bump"	6	7	7	6	7	33	—N/a
5	Parno Graszt	"Már nem szédülök"	7	9	8	9	5	38	Advanced
6	Viki Singh	"Katonák"	5	8	7	8	6	34	—N/a
7	Juli Horányi	"Come Along"	5	7	7	6	6	31	—N/a
8	Petruska	"Trouble in My Mind"	9	9	8	9	7	42	Advanced
9	Olivér Berkes and Andi Tóth	"Seven Seas"	5	7	9	6	7	34	Advanced
10	Szilvia Agárdi	"It Is Love"	8	9	8	8	7	40	Advanced

===== Semi-finals =====
Two semi-finals took place on 13 and 20 February 2016. In each semi-final nine entries competed and four entries qualified to the final after two rounds of voting. In the first round of voting, three qualifiers were determined by the combination of scores from each judge and an aggregate score from a public SMS and mobile app vote. In the second round of voting, the remaining six entries that were not in the initial top three faced a public vote consisting of votes submitted through SMS in order to determine one additional qualifier.

In addition to the competing entries, other performers featured during the shows. Második Műszak featuring Misi Mező performed in semi-final 1 and Zséda and Ferenc Demjén performed in semi-final 2.

Jury and public voting qualifier Public voting qualifier

Semi-final 1 – 13 February 2016
R/O	Artist	Song	Pierrot	Zséda	K. Frenreisz	M. Both	Viewers	Total	Result
1	Reni Tolvai	"Fire"	5	9	7	7	5	33	—N/a
2	Petruska	"Trouble in My Mind"	9	9	9	9	7	43	Advanced
3	Szilvia Agárdi	"It Is Love"	8	8	8	8	7	39	—N/a
4	B The First	"You Told Me You Loved Me"	6	8	7	8	6	35	—N/a
5	Gergő Oláh	"Győz a jó"	7	10	9	9	7	42	Advanced
6	Benji	"Kötéltánc"	6	7	7	7	6	33	—N/a
7	Kállay Saunders Band	"Who We Are"	8	9	9	7	8	41	Advanced
8	Karmapolis and Böbe Szécsi	"Hold On To"	7	7	7	8	6	35	—N/a
9	Mushu	"Uncle Tom"	7	8	8	9	7	39	Advanced

Semi-final 2 – 20 February 2016
R/O	Artist	Song	Pierrot	Zséda	K. Frenreisz	M. Both	Viewers	Total	Result
1	Egy Másik Zenekar	"Kéne közös kép"	4	8	7	9	5	33	—N/a
2	Olivér Berkes and Andi Tóth	"Seven Seas"	5	8	8	6	6	33	Advanced
3	André Vásáry	"Why"	10	9	9	8	6	42	Advanced
4	Passed	"Driftin'"	7	7	7	6	6	33	—N/a
5	Laci Gáspár	"Love and Bass"	6	8	8	7	6	35	—N/a
6	Nika	"Emlékkép"	8	9	8	8	6	39	—N/a
7	ByTheWay	"Free to Fly"	6	7	7	6	5	31	—N/a
8	Freddie	"Pioneer"	10	10	10	8	9	47	Advanced
9	Parno Graszt	"Már nem szédülök"	9	9	8	10	6	42	Advanced

===== Final =====
The final took place on 27 February 2016 where the eight entries that qualified from the semi-finals competed. The winner of the competition was selected over two rounds of voting. In the first round, the jury determined the top four entries that advanced to the second round. The voting system for the four jurors was different from the method used in the heats and semi-finals. Each juror announced their scores after all songs had been performed rather than assigning scores following each performance and the jurors ranked their preferred top four entries and assigned points in the following manner: 4 (lowest), 6, 8 and 10 (highest). The four entries with the highest total scores proceeded to the second round. In the second round, "Pioneer" performed by Freddie was selected as the winner via a public vote consisting of votes submitted through SMS, mobile app and online voting.

In addition to the performances of the competing entries, guest performers included Norway's Eurovision Song Contest 2009 winner Alexander Rybak and A Dal 2015 winner and the 2015 Hungarian Eurovision entrant Boggie.

Advanced to the second round Winner

Final – First Round – 27 February 2016
R/O	Artist	Song	Pierrot	Zséda	K. Frenreisz	M. Both	Total	Place
1	Mushu	"Uncle Tom"	0	0	0	0	0	8
2	Parno Graszt	"Már nem szédülök"	0	0	0	4	4	6
3	Olivér Berkes and Andi Tóth	"Seven Seas"	0	4	0	0	4	6
4	Petruska	"Trouble in My Mind"	0	0	4	10	14	4
5	Gergő Oláh	"Győz a jó"	6	8	6	8	28	2
6	Freddie	"Pioneer"	8	10	10	6	34	1
7	Kállay Saunders Band	"Who We Are"	4	6	8	0	18	3
8	André Vásáry	"Why"	10	0	0	0	10	5

Final – Second Round – 27 February 2016
Artist	Song
Freddie	"Pioneer"
Kállay Saunders Band	"Who We Are"
Gergő Oláh	"Győz a jó"
Petruska	"Trouble in My Mind"

==== Other awards ====
Apart from winning the right to represent Hungary at the Eurovision Song Contest, several other awards were distributed during the competition. An online acoustic contest was held concurrently where the public could vote online for the best acoustic interpretation from all of the competing entries. The winner, "Free to Fly" performed by ByTheWay, was awarded a one-hour acoustic concert broadcast on Petőfi Rádió. For 2016, the broadcaster added two new awards: Best Lyrics Awards, the winner of which was determined by the four-member jury panel and audience, and the Breakthrough Award, the winner of which was decided upon solely by the jury. In addition, a remix contest also took place where members of the public were given access to the different components of each song and the best remix version was determined by a professional jury assembled by Petöfi Rádió.

- Breakthrough Award: Petruska
- Best Lyrics Award: Borbála Csarnai, lyricist for "Pioneer"
- Best Acoustic Version: "Free to Fly" performed by ByTheWay
- Best Remix Version: "Seven Seas" (Victor Strada Remix) performed by Olivér Berkes and Andi Tóth

=== Promotion ===
Freddie's promotional activities in the lead up to the Eurovision Song Contest were focused within Hungary where he made appearances at media events and completed an acoustic concert tour. In addition to his appearances in Hungary, Freddie also took part in promotional activities in Tel Aviv, Israel between 11 and 13 April where he performed during the Israel Calling event held at the Ha'teatron venue.

== At Eurovision ==
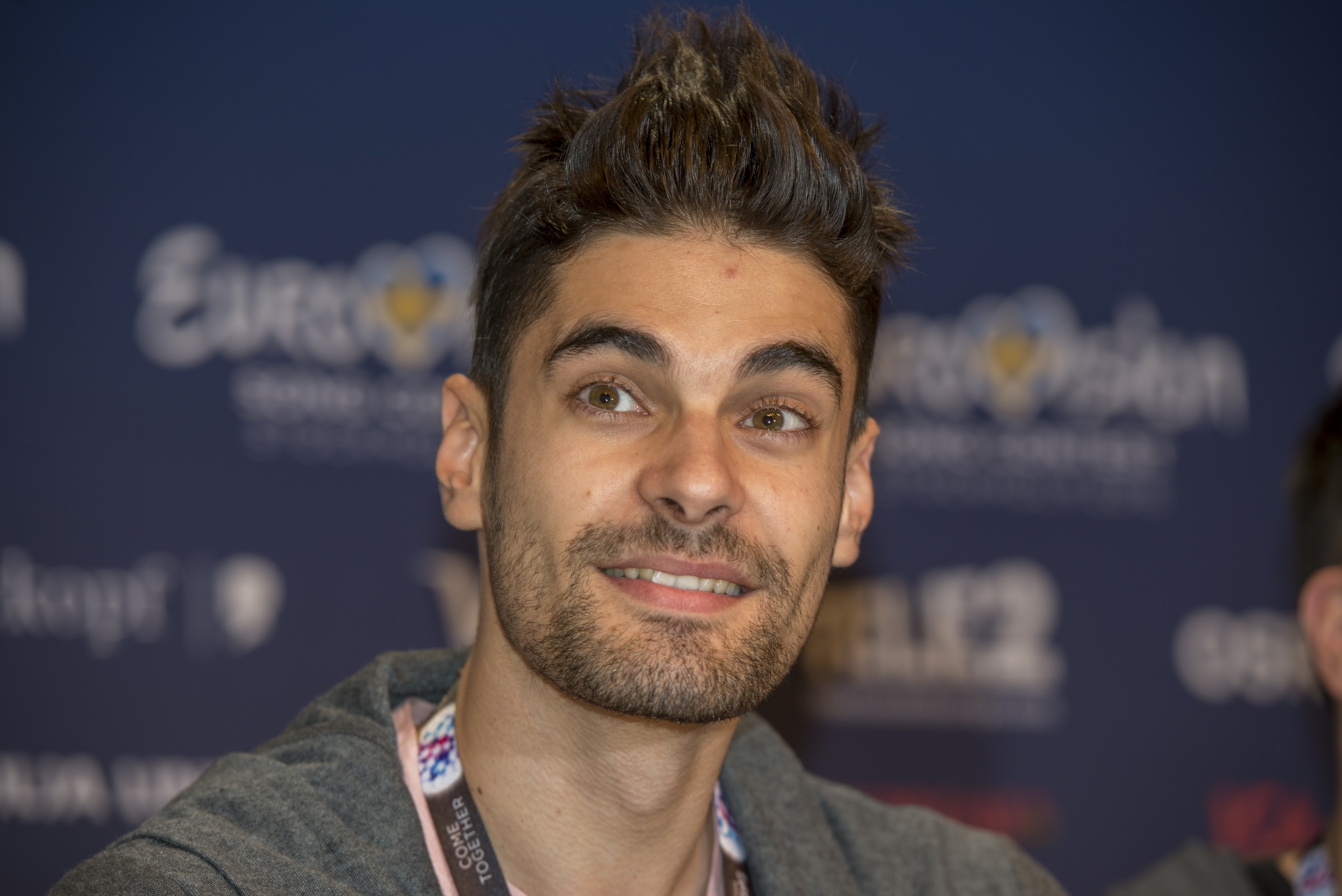
Freddie during a press meet and greet

According to Eurovision rules, all nations with the exceptions of the host country and the "Big Five" (France, Germany, Italy, Spain and the United Kingdom) are required to qualify from one of two semi-finals in order to compete for the final; the top ten countries from each semi-final progress to the final. The European Broadcasting Union (EBU) split up the competing countries into six different pots based on voting patterns from previous contests, with countries with favourable voting histories put into the same pot. On 25 January 2016, a special allocation draw was held which placed each country into one of the two semi-finals, as well as which half of the show they would perform in. Hungary was placed into the first semi-final, to be held on 10 May 2016, and was scheduled to perform in the first half of the show.

Once all the competing songs for the 2016 contest had been released, the running order for the semi-finals was decided by the shows' producers rather than through another draw, so that similar songs were not placed next to each other. Hungary was set to perform in position 4, following the entry from Moldova and before the entry from Croatia.

The two semi-finals and the final were broadcast in Hungary on Duna with commentary by Gábor Gundel Takács. The Hungarian spokesperson, who announced the top 12-point score awarded by the Hungarian jury during the final, was Csilla Tatár.

=== Semi-final ===
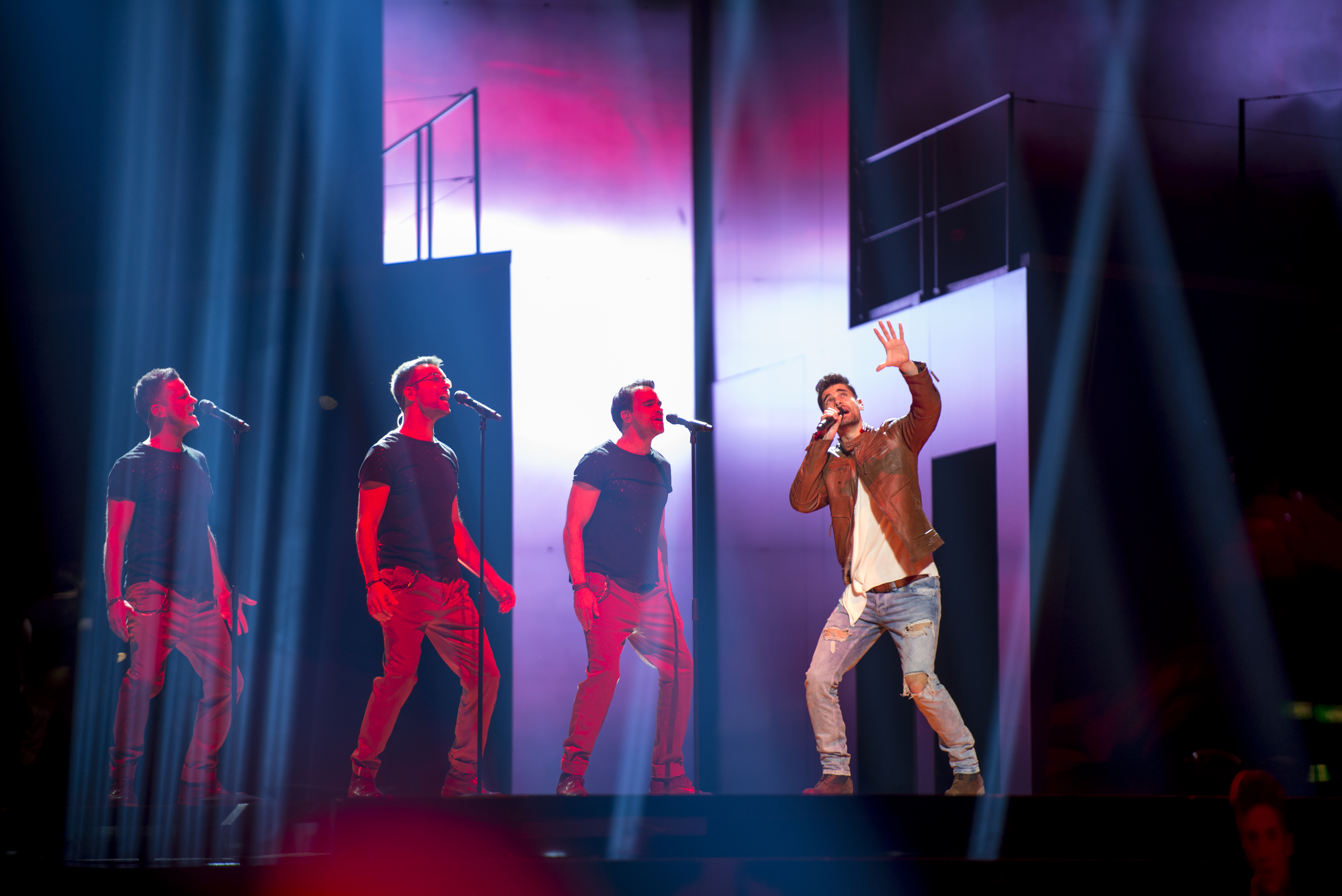
Freddie during a rehearsal before the first semi-final

Freddie took part in technical rehearsals on 2 and 6 May, followed by dress rehearsals on 9 and 10 May. This included the jury show on 9 May where the professional juries of each country watched and voted on the competing entries.

The Hungarian performance featured Freddie dressed in jeans and a white asymmetrical shirt with the stage displaying predominantly blue and red lighting and the LED screens projecting red designs and hurricane/thunder effects. On stage, Freddie was joined by three backing vocalists: Tamás Mészáros, Barnabás Wodala and Gábor Molnár, all members of the a cappella group Fool Moon. The performance also featured a drummer: Dávid Baranya.

At the end of the show, Hungary was announced as having finished in the top 10 and subsequently qualifying for the grand final. It was later revealed that Hungary placed fourth in the semi-final, receiving a total of 197 points: 119 points from the televoting and 78 points from the juries.

=== Final ===
Shortly after the first semi-final, a winners' press conference was held for the ten qualifying countries. As part of this press conference, the qualifying artists took part in a draw to determine which half of the grand final they would subsequently participate in. This draw was done in the order the countries appeared in the semi-final running order. Hungary was drawn to compete in the first half. Following this draw, the shows' producers decided upon the running order of the final, as they had done for the semi-finals. Hungary was subsequently placed to perform in position 5, following the entry from Azerbaijan and before the entry from Italy.

Freddie once again took part in dress rehearsals on 13 and 14 May before the final, including the jury final where the professional juries cast their final votes before the live show. Freddie performed a repeat of his semi-final performance during the final on 14 May. Hungary placed nineteenth in the final, scoring 108 points: 56 points from the televoting and 52 points from the juries.

=== Voting ===
Voting during the three shows was conducted under a new system that involved each country now awarding two sets of points from 1-8, 10 and 12: one from their professional jury and the other from televoting. Each nation's jury consisted of five music industry professionals who are citizens of the country they represent, with their names published before the contest to ensure transparency. This jury judged each entry based on: vocal capacity; the stage performance; the song's composition and originality; and the overall impression by the act. In addition, no member of a national jury was permitted to be related in any way to any of the competing acts in such a way that they cannot vote impartially and independently. The individual rankings of each jury member as well as the nation's televoting results were released shortly after the grand final.

Below is a breakdown of points awarded to Hungary and awarded by Hungary in the first semi-final and grand final of the contest, and the breakdown of the jury voting and televoting conducted during the two shows:

==== Points awarded to Hungary ====
Points awarded to Hungary (Semi-final 1)
Score	Televote	Jury
12 points		Czech Republic
10 points		Spain
8 points	Austria; Croatia; Malta	Azerbaijan; Croatia
7 points	Azerbaijan; France; Greece; San Marino	Greece
6 points	Armenia; Cyprus; Czech Republic; Iceland; Moldova; Montenegro; Netherlands; Russia	Cyprus
5 points	Estonia; Spain	Estonia; France
4 points	Finland; Sweden	Bosnia and Herzegovina; Russia
3 points		Moldova; Netherlands
2 points		Iceland
1 point	Bosnia and Herzegovina	Montenegro

Points awarded to Hungary (Final)
Score	Televote	Jury
12 points		
10 points	Serbia	Czech Republic; Spain
8 points		
7 points	Azerbaijan	Montenegro
6 points	Poland	
5 points	Malta	Croatia
4 points	Cyprus	Azerbaijan; Cyprus
3 points	Armenia; Belarus; Croatia; Czech Republic; Montenegro	Greece; Slovenia
2 points	Georgia; Greece; Lithuania	San Marino; Ukraine
1 point	Albania; Bosnia and Herzegovina; San Marino	Albania; Russia

==== Points awarded by Hungary ====
Points awarded by Hungary (Semi-final 1)
Score	Televote	Jury
12 points	Azerbaijan	Malta
10 points	Russia	Russia
8 points	Austria	Czech Republic
7 points	Cyprus	Azerbaijan
6 points	Netherlands	Netherlands
5 points	San Marino	Armenia
4 points	Malta	Finland
3 points	Czech Republic	Croatia
2 points	Armenia	Cyprus
1 point	Finland	Iceland

Points awarded by Hungary (Final)
Score	Televote	Jury
12 points	Ukraine	Australia
10 points	Russia	Malta
8 points	Poland	Latvia
7 points	Sweden	Azerbaijan
6 points	Austria	Netherlands
5 points	Cyprus	Spain
4 points	Bulgaria	Sweden
3 points	Australia	Lithuania
2 points	Netherlands	Czech Republic
1 point	France	Armenia

==== Detailed voting results ====
The following members comprised the Hungarian jury:

- Viktor Rakonczai (jury chairperson) – composer, pianist, music producer, represented Hungary in the 1997 contest as member of V.I.P.
- Károly Frenreisz – musician, composer, lyricist
- Behnam "Begi" Lotfi – musical producer, disc jockey, represented Hungary in the 2012 contest as member of Compact Disco
- Péter Novák – performer
- Kati Wolf – singer, represented Hungary in the 2011 contest

Detailed voting results from Hungary (Semi-final 1)
R/O	Country	Jury							Televote	
R/O	Country	V. Rakonczai	K. Frenreisz	B. Lotfi	P. Novák	K. Wolf	Rank	Points	Rank	Points
01	Finland	9	8	12	4	2	7	4	10	1
02	Greece	12	16	13	13	6	14		16	
03	Moldova	6	12	16	16	7	13		15	
04	Hungary									
05	Croatia	5	9	8	6	11	8	3	12	
06	Netherlands	7	4	7	8	8	5	6	5	6
07	Armenia	8	2	9	3	12	6	5	9	2
08	San Marino	17	17	17	17	17	17		6	5
09	Russia	4	3	5	2	5	2	10	2	10
10	Czech Republic	3	5	4	7	1	3	8	8	3
11	Cyprus	10	7	6	14	13	9	2	4	7
12	Austria	15	13	15	5	9	12		3	8
13	Estonia	11	15	10	12	4	11		11	
14	Azerbaijan	1	6	1	11	3	4	7	1	12
15	Montenegro	13	14	14	15	16	16		17	
16	Iceland	14	10	3	10	14	10	1	13	
17	Bosnia and Herzegovina	16	11	11	9	15	15		14	
18	Malta	2	1	2	1	10	1	12	7	4

Detailed voting results from Hungary (Final)
R/O	Country	Jury							Televote	
R/O	Country	V. Rakonczai	K. Frenreisz	B. Lotfi	P. Novák	K. Wolf	Rank	Points	Rank	Points
01	Belgium	20	12	5	24	4	14		14	
02	Czech Republic	7	17	6	21	1	9	2	18	
03	Netherlands	6	5	7	16	8	5	6	9	2
04	Azerbaijan	5	13	1	18	5	4	7	16	
05	Hungary									
06	Italy	15	20	17	23	15	21		19	
07	Israel	25	18	3	11	9	16		17	
08	Bulgaria	23	14	16	20	20	22		7	4
09	Sweden	8	21	4	12	3	7	4	4	7
10	Germany	10	24	9	19	10	17		13	
11	France	14	19	10	22	19	20		10	1
12	Poland	24	23	24	25	18	25		3	8
13	Australia	4	8	2	1	2	1	12	8	3
14	Cyprus	13	11	11	13	17	15		6	5
15	Serbia	19	22	23	17	25	24		24	
16	Lithuania	1	16	8	10	16	8	3	23	
17	Croatia	17	7	12	14	24	18		21	
18	Russia	12	10	21	8	14	13		2	10
19	Spain	9	1	14	9	13	6	5	15	
20	Latvia	2	9	13	7	6	3	8	11	
21	Ukraine	18	4	15	6	21	12		1	12
22	Malta	3	2	20	3	7	2	10	20	
23	Georgia	16	15	18	4	11	11		22	
24	Austria	22	25	25	2	23	23		5	6
25	United Kingdom	21	6	19	15	22	19		25	
26	Armenia	11	3	22	5	12	10	1	12	
