= II =

II is the Roman numeral for 2.

II may also refer to:

== Biology and medicine ==
- Image intensifier, medical imaging equipment
- Invariant chain, a polypeptide involved in the formation and transport of MHC class II protein
- Optic nerve, the second cranial nerve

== Economics ==
- Income inequality, or the wealth gap, in economics
- Institutional Investor (magazine), an American finance magazine

== Music ==
=== Albums ===
- II (2 Unlimited album), 1998
- II (Aquilo album), 2018
- II (Bad Books album), 2012
- II (Boyz II Men album), 1994
- II (Capital Kings album), 2015
- II (Charade album), 2004
- II (The Common Linnets album), 2015
- II (Compact Disco album), 2011
- II (Cursed album), 2005
- II (Espers album), 2006
- II (Denzel Curry and Kenny Beats album), 2026
- II (Fuzz album), 2015
- II (Hardline album), 2002
- II (High Rise album), 1986
- II (Khun Narin album), 2016
- II (Kingston Wall album), 1993
- II (The Kinleys album), 2000
- II (Kurious album), 2009
- II (Last in Line album), 2019
- II (Lords of Black album), 2016
- II (Maylene and the Sons of Disaster album), 2007
- II (METZ album), 2015
- II (Moderat album), 2013
- II (The Presidents of the United States of America album), 1996
- II (Sahg album), 2008
- II (Seven Thorns album), 2013
- II (Unknown Mortal Orchestra album), 2013
- II (Xerath album), 2011
- II, by Krux, 2006
- II, by Majical Cloudz, 2011
- II, by Viva Brother, 2017
- II (EP), a 2026 EP by Riize
- II, an EP by TNGHT, 2019
- Crystal Castles II, 2010
- Led Zeppelin II, 1969
- Meat Puppets II, 1984
- Soul Assassins II, 2000
- Viva Koenji!, Koenji Hyakkei album, also known as 弐(II)
- Iris II, by Iris, 1987

=== Other uses in music ===
- Supertonic, in music
- "ii", 2018 song by CHVRCHES from Love Is Dead

== People and social groups ==
- Ii is a Japanese surname, daimyō of Hikone:
  - Ii clan, Japanese clan (Sengoku period)
  - Ii Naomasa, one of four Guardians of the Tokugawa clan
  - Ii Naotora, female daimyō and foster mother of Naomasa
  - Ii Naoyuki, a Japanese author
- II, drummer for the band Sleep Token
- John Papa ʻĪʻī, a Hawaiian noble

== Other uses ==
- ii (digraph), a digraph in certain romanized alphabets
- ii (IRC client), short for IRC It, an Internet Relay Chat client for Unix-like operating systems
- Ii, Finland, a municipality of Finland
- Illegal immigrant (especially in Hong Kong and Macau vernacular)
- Index Islamicus, a bibliography database of publications about Islam and the Muslim world
- Internet Infidels, a discussion forum
- IBC Airways (IATA code: II)
- Yi language (ISO 639-1: ii)
- Interactive Investor, an online investment platform in the United Kingdom.
- Independent Ireland, a political party in the Republic of Ireland
