= Miklós Both =

- Born: 3 June 1981 (age 45); Budapest, Hungary
- Origin: Budapest
- Genres: World, ethnic, rock
- Occupations: Musician, composer, folklorist
- Instruments: Guitar, violin
- Years active: 2001–present

Miklós Both (born 3 June 1981, Budapest) is a Hungarian composer, performer, folklorist, singer for the band Napra, guitarist, and vitar violin player. He won the Fonogram and Budai awards, and honored with the Hungarian Gold Cross of Merit. His folklore film database has recordings from Ukraine, China, Transylvania, Iran, India and others. In 2015, he was chosen by Öröm a Zene! as musician of the year.

== Career ==
Both attended Pázmány Péter Catholic University, majoring in aesthetics and also studied communications. He independently learned to play the guitar. In 2000, for a short period, he participated in the Galloping Coroners and Kárpát Möbiusz bands. In 2004, he founded his own band called Napra, and joined the legendary Hungarian band Barbaro. Napra's debut album, produced in 2007 by Ben Mandelson, won a Fonogram award, Best World Music Album of the Year.

In 2009, at the 100th anniversary celebration of Miklós Radnóti's birth, with Dániel Gryllus as host, Both was commissioned to create music for a reading of the poet's works by the series editor of Helicon Audio album. The album was recorded at the Budapest International Book Festival and received the Buda Award. In 2011, he became the head of Cafés & Citizenry, an international project for Romani integration. The project is funded by the European Union, whose members are Hungarian, Italian and Romanian musicians who hold workshops and concerts in several countries.

At the World Music Expo (WOMEX) in Copenhagen in 2011, Both was part of Hungary's opening ceremony along with four other musicians, who later in 2012, founded the Both Miklós Folkside project. The band members are cymbalist Miklós Lukács, Balázs Szokolay Dongó with brass instruments, András Dés with percussion, and Csaba Novák on the bass. Their first album, Csillagfészek, was released in 2013.

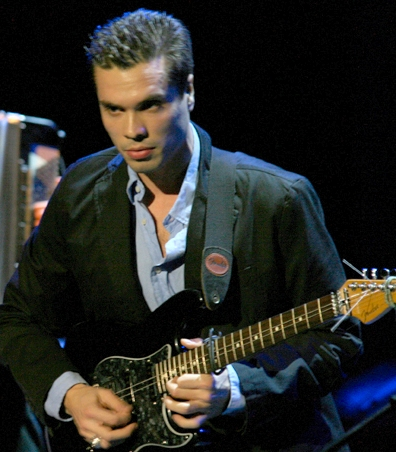
Miklós Both with Napra in 2008

In February 2014, he traveled to the Yunnan region of China to study the local music for four months and recorded an album. The disc incorporates the inspired songs beyond the purely aesthetic considerations and a higher overall arc of thought appears. During the time he spent in China, Both met with dozens of musicians and reworked and recorded many of their songs. The album also has performers of the contemporary music scene. Both and photos of a diary-documentary disc were released in October 2014, was presented at the Millenáris Theatre Café in Budapest with great success.

In 2014, he prepared an alternative talent search show on MTVA Palimo Story. A small crew traveled through Hungary searching for musicians. Through the series, they explore and actually succeed to showcase the unseen talents that are in the country. Both and musicians whom he has found appear on an eponymous album released in the summer of 2014.

In autumn 2014 he visits Ukraine for the first time, recording folk songs in 5 villages. This is an influential journey in his life; from this point onward, he travels to the country several times per year in order to build a database of folklore. He works alone in the first years, but his work is noticed by many people in Ukraine and he begins collaborating with a growing number of people. Collecting is carried out in increasingly improving technical quality.

In 2016, Both was a judge on A Dal, the Hungarian national selection for Hungary in the Eurovision Song Contest. He reprised this role for the 2017 edition and did so again for the 2018 edition.

In 2016, he was a guest of honor at the Ördögkatlan Festival, along with Dorottya Udvaros and Péter Gerzson Kovács. The festival has its own courtyard in three central Ukrainian villages.

In 2017, Fidelio Magazine elects him among the 50 most influential people in Hungarian culture in the frame of its KULT50 edition.

In 2017, his team is granted the European Union's Creative Europe grant, for which he devised the application, as the founder and leader of the newly launched Polyphony Project. In connection with this, he enters partnership with the Ivan Honchar museum in Kyiv.

In May 2018, recordings made over four years are published in an online database of academic quality, eliciting great interest and attention from all over the world. The intensity of interest is demonstrated by the fact that Ukraine's Minister of Culture Yevhen Nyshchuk gave a speech at the opening ceremony along with a number of Ukrainian and Hungarian folklorists.

By mid-2018, music, dances, interviews and documentaries had been recorded across nearly 130 villages; at this point, the database contains approximately 3000 songs.

In 2018, he was awarded the Gold Cross of Merit of the Republic of Hungary.

== Discography ==
- Tisztelgés az Illés zenekar előtt – Amikor én még kissrác voltam, 2005.
- Barbaro – Barbaro III, 2006.
- Berkó zenekar, Berkó 2007.
- Jaj, a világ!, Napra 2007.
- Both Miklós – Radnóti, Hangzó Helikon 2009.
- Blind Myself: Budapest, 7fok, eső, 2009.
- Rendhagyó Prímástalálkozó, I. 2010.
- Cseh Tamás emléklemez – Eszembe jutottál, 2010.
- Holdvilágos, Napra 2010.
- The Twist: Live Through The Cool, 2011.
- Naiv, Napra 2012 (EP)
- Csillagfészek, Both Miklós Folkside 2013.
- Rendhagyó Prímástalálkozó: II. 2013.
- Both Miklós és a Palimo Story, Fonó Records, 2014.
- Kínai utazólemez, Gryllus, 2014.
- Hej, Kapolcsról fúj a szél – vagány népdalok a Kaláka Versudvarból 2018.
- Nana Vortex – Aranylemez 2018.

== Awards ==
- Hungarian Music Awards: Best World Music Album of the Year (2008)
- Budai award (2009)
- Hungarian Music Awards: Best World Music Album of the Year (2011)
- Hungarian Music Awards: Best World Music Album of the Year (nominated, 2014)
- Hungarian Music Awards: Best World Music Album of the Year (nominated, 2015)
- Musician of the Year (2015)
- Hungarian Gold Cross of Merit (2018)

== Further information ==
- GitárVilág interjú
- KultúrPart interjú
- Origó vendégszoba
