= Zséda =

Hungarian singer

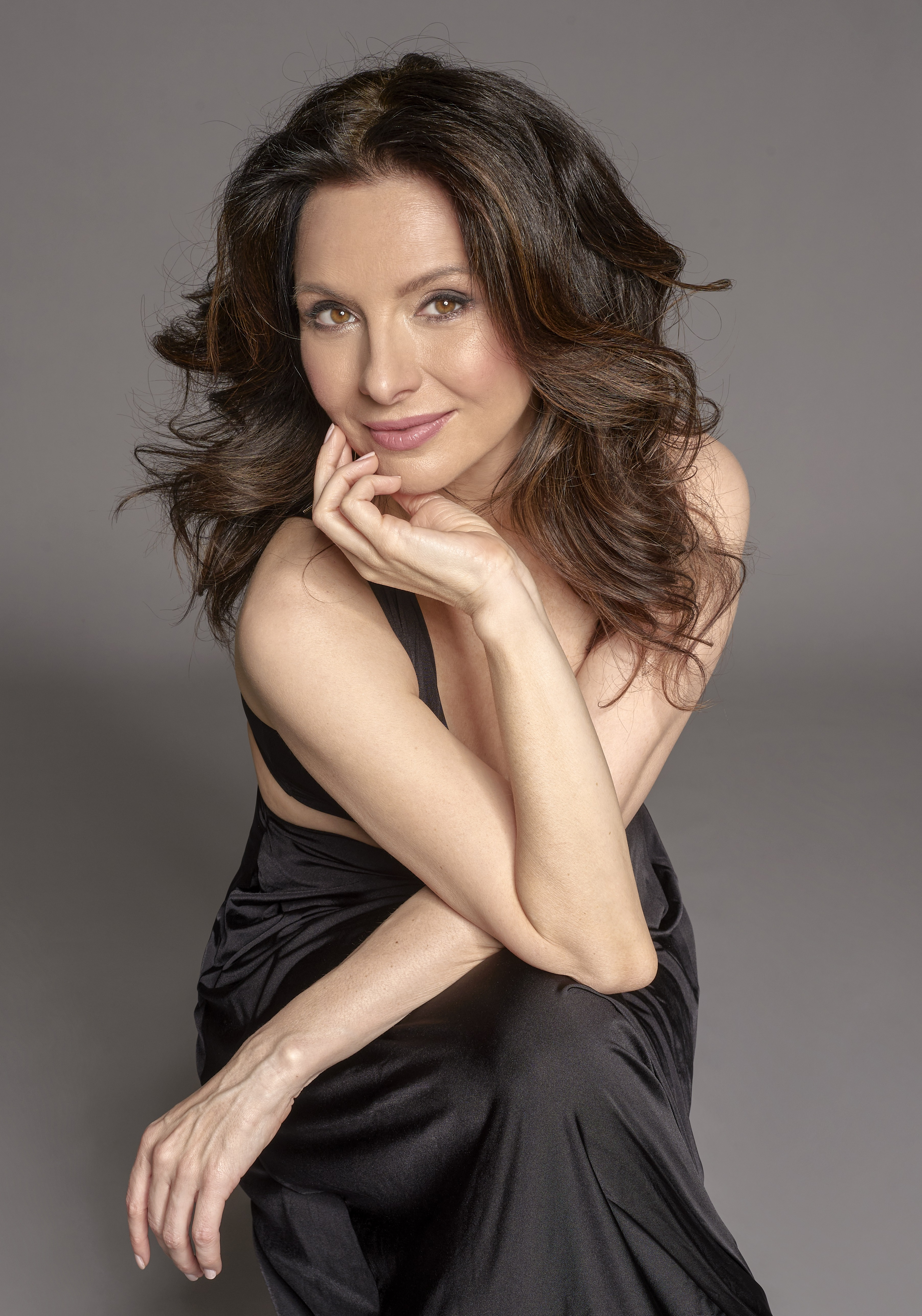
- Zséda in 2024

Background information
- Born: Adrienn Zsédenyi; 30 December 1974 (age 51); Pápa, Hungary
- Occupation: Singer
- Years active: 1994–present

Adrienn Zsédenyi (born 30 December 1974 in Pápa), known as Zséda, is a Hungarian singer.

== Life ==
Zséda grew up in Szentes and attended the Mihály Horváth Secondary School where she joined drama and literature groups. At 15 years of age, she studied singing with Olga Sík and also learnt to play the violin. Zséda acted at the Arany János Theatre, Independent Theatre, Krétakör Theatre, and New Theatre. She received an undergraduate degree in social work from the University of West Hungary.

== Career ==
=== Cotton Club Singers (1994–2001, 2020) ===
In 1994, Zséda, Gabi Szűcs, Péter Kovács, and Boldizsár László co-founded the Cotton Club Singers. They performed at venues including the Buda Park Stage and the Budapest Congress Center. Over a six year period, Zséda performed on five albums. She left the group in 2001 before the group disbanded in 2009. Zséda went on to form White Chocolate and also pursued a solo career. In 2020, Zséda planned to participate in a large 25th anniversary concert for the Cotton Club Singers at the Béla Bartók National Concert Hall, but it was cancelled due to the COVID-19 pandemic.

=== Solo career (2002–present) ===
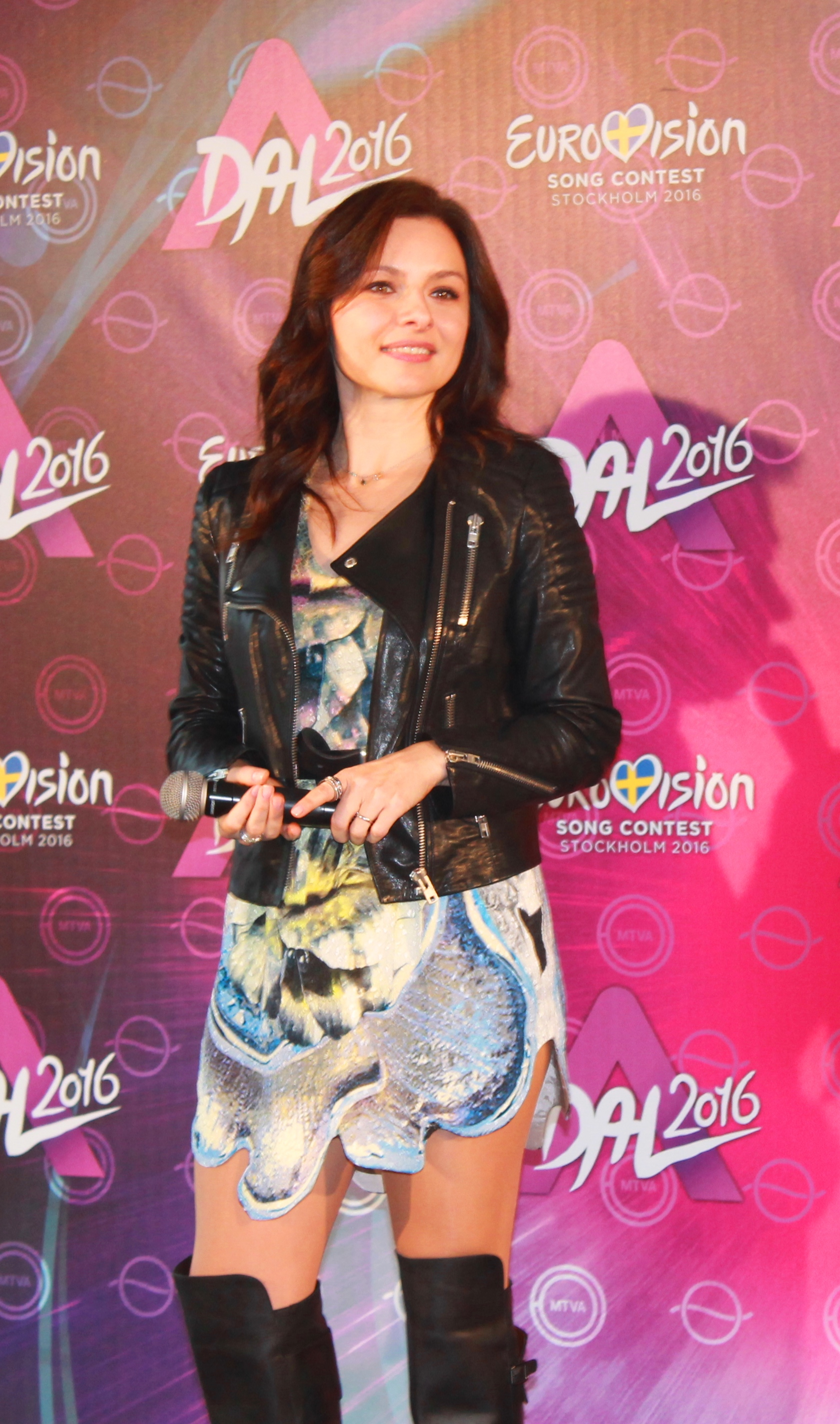
Zséda in 2015

Zséda performed with Mihály Tabányi in Washington D.C. as part of the Hungarian delegation to the Folger Shakespeare Library.

In 2002, Zséda released her debut solo album. It was produced by Viktor Rakonczai at the Kőbánya Music Studio. The album reached gold record certification. One of the most popular songs on the album was Valahol egy férfi vár. It was number one on the VIVA TV charts for three weeks. In 2003, Zséda performed the theme song of the RTL Klub soap opera, Szeress most!. This brought her recognition in Hungary.

In 2004, Zséda released her second album, Zséda-Vue. The album also produced several successful singles, including Motel, Mindhalálig mellettem vagy, and Újhold. This was her first album to reach platinum certification.

In 2005, Zséda released her first Christmas album, A szürke patás which also went platinum.

In 2007, Zséda and Ákos Létray recorded Valahol as a duet. The song was popular on VIVA TV and spent forty weeks on the MAHASZ radio charts.

In 2008, Zséda's fourth album, Rouge, was released. The album's first single, Fekete rúzs, was another VIVA TV hit. Zseda's concert at the Papp László Budapest Sports Arena on 28 May 2009 was sold-out.

In 2011, Zséda released her fifth album, Legyen úgy.further success followed in 2012 with Más világ, and Ötödik érzék.

In 2013, Zséda performed Dance, and released Hétköznapi mennyország. She released Hány percet élsz in 2014. In 2015, Zseda collaborated with Csaba Vastag in Legyél a másé. In 2016, she released Óceán and Adj még levegőt.

In 2016, Zséda was a judge on A Dal, the Hungarian national selection for the Eurovision Song Contest. In 2017, she was again a member of the selection jury.

== Discography ==
- Zséda (2002)
- Zséda-Vue (2004)
- Ünnep (2005)
- Rouge (2008)
- Ötödik érzék (2012)
- Kémia (2016)
- Szívizomláz (2021)

== Awards ==
- Fonogram award (2004, 2009 (x2), 2010)
- VIVA Comet (2005 (x2), 2009 (x3), 2010)
- BRAVO OTTO award (2010 (x4))
- Glamour Woman of the Year (2009, 2010)
- eMeRTon award
- Artisjus award (2004)

== Filmography ==
=== Film ===
- Nyugattól keletre, avagy a média diszkrét bája
- Csudafilm (theme song)
- Megy a gőzös (film music)

=== TV ===
- Szeress most! (theme song)
- Szombat esti láz (competed)
- Megasztár 4 (guest singer)
- Csináljuk a fesztivált
- X-Faktor (guest singer)
- A Dal (2016) (jury member)
- A Dal (2017) (jury member)

== Activism ==
Zséda has supported the Fight against Breast Cancer Campaign, the Together for Nature campaign, and the Uniting Against Domestic Violence campaign.

== Further information ==
- Zsédenyi Adrienn hivatalos oldala
- Zene.hu
- Mahasz.hu
- EURO 200
- Zséda rajongói oldal
