= Vásáry =

Vásáry is a Hungarian surname. Notable people with the surname include:

- André Vásáry (born 1982), Hungarian singer and sopranist
- István Vásáry (1887–1955), Hungarian politician
- Tamás Vásáry (1933–2026), Hungarian concert pianist and conductor
