= Stereoid =

Studio album by Compact Disco
- Released: 3 Dec 2009
- Recorded: August 2008 – March–June 2009, Compact Disco's home studio and Groovejack Studio, Budapest
- Genre: Electropop, synthpop
- Length: 43:50
- Language: English
- Label: CLS Records
- Producer: Compact Disco, Tits & Clits (Tits & Clits Remix)

Stereoid is the first album of the Hungarian electronic trio Compact Disco. It was released in 2009 by Hungarian independent record label CLS Records.

== Track listing ==
1. "Heartbeat" 3:23
2. "No Escape" 3:26
3. "Without You" 4:13
4. "Fly or Dive" 4:08
5. "Electropop" 3:03
6. "I'm in Love" (Album Version) 4:14
7. "Get it Right" 4:24
8. "Samantha Funk" 3:46
9. "All Night" 4:04
10. "Horizon" 4:28
11. "I'm in Love" (Tits & Clits Remix)

== Personnel ==
- Behnam Lotfi - loops, grooves, effects, recording (music) (tracks 1–10), composer, lyricist, producer (tracks 1–10)
- Gábor Pál - keyboards, recording (music) (tracks 1–10), composer, lyricist, producer (tracks 1–10)
- Csaba Walkó - lead and backing vocals, recording (music) (tracks 1–10), composer, lyricist, producer (tracks 1–10)
- Gábor Némethy - recording (vocals), mixing, and mastering
- Tits & Clits - remix, mixing, mastering, and producing on track 11
