= II (Compact Disco album) =

Second Album of Compact Disco

Studio album by Compact Disco
- Released: 14 May 2011
- Recorded: August 2010 – April 2011; Compact Disco's home studio and Groovejack Studio, Budapest
- Genre: Electropop, synthpop
- Length: 39:05
- Language: English
- Label: CLS Music
- Producer: Compact Disco

II is the second album of the Hungarian electronic band, Compact Disco. It was released in 2011 by Hungarian independent record label CLS Music.

== Track listing ==
1. "Always On My Mind" 4:09
2. "Beautiful Day" 3:46
3. "Feel The Rain" 3:55
4. "Fly With You" 4:21
5. "I Feel Love" 3:52
6. "I'm Gonna Get You" 3:38
7. "Going To Forget" 4:05
8. "One More Day" 3:34
9. "A Part Of You" 3:50
10. "Leave It Up To Me" 3:55

== Personnel ==
- Behnam Lotfi – loops, grooves, effects, recording (music), composer, lyricist, producer
- Gábor Pál – keyboards, recording (music), composer, lyricist, producer
- Attila Sándor – bass, guitars, recording (music), producer, cover design
- Csaba Walkó – lead and backing vocals, recording (music), composer, lyricist, producer
- Gábor Deutsch (aka. Anorganik) – mixing and mastering
- Gábor Némethy – recording (vocals)
- Georgina Győrik – lyricist on Feel The Rain
- Ádám Temesi – cover photography
