= Irigy Hónaljmirigy =

Hungarian comedy music group

Irigy Hónaljmirigy (literal translation: "Envious Armpit Gland", often abbreviated as IHM) are a Hungarian comedy/parody band, known around Hungary for their parodies of popular songs from both the country and abroad, as well as celebrities and TV shows. They had their own TV show, Irigy Hónaljmirigy Show, which ran on TV2 from 2000 until 2010. On their demos and their first album, they mostly parodied Hungarian rock songs, from their second album and onwards they started parodying the popular music scene in general. Since 2004, the band's albums are released by Hungarian major record label CLS Music.

== History ==
Irigy Hónaljmirigy formed at a New Year's Eve party in 1990 in Mátyásföld under the name "Fintorock." The band consisted of Imre Molnár, Péter Sipos, Zoltán "Zoli" Ambrus, Gábor "Katec" Katona, Attila Várszegi and László Kabai. Their first gig was at a pub called "Tüzesvíz" (literally: "Fiery Water", a Hungarian synonym for alcohol), in 1991. Gábor and Attila has left the band shortly after, and were replaced by Ferenc "Feri" Papp and László Uszkó. They released two demos in 1993, and they released their first album, Fetrengés, in the following year. The album features parodies of classic Hungarian rock/metal bands (Edda Művek, Ossian, Pokolgép, etc.) along with pop music parodies (Mester és tanítványai, Manhattan). After this album, their popularity started to rise, more and more people started knowing their name. The group released their second album, A csillagok háborognak (a pun on the Hungarian title for Star Wars), in 1996. By this time, the band became popular, they even started making concerts in large arenas such as the Budapest Sportaréna. In this album they started parodying popular music in general, but parodies of Hungarian rock bands still appeared in this album (Piramis, Karthago, P. Mobil).

They released a mini-album called Buliwood (a pun on Hollywood) in 1997. Irigy Hónaljmirigy released their third album, Snassz Vegasz (a pun on Las Vegas), in 1998. By this album, IHM completely stopped parodying rock music, instead they parodied the hits of that time. In the year 1999, they released a mini album called Sovány Vegasz which featured remixes of their earlier songs, along with some new songs which also appeared in their next album, Selejtező, which was also released in 1999. The next year saw the release of the album Ráncdalfesztivál, which parodied classic Hungarian songs, as well the event of Táncdalfesztivál (a popular music competition held from 1966 to 1994, and the direct precursor of A Dal, which has been held every year since 2012). in general. In New Year's Eve 2000, the Ráncdalfesztivál concert was broadcast live on TV2, which also started their TV show that run until 2010. In 2001, they released the album Flúgos Futam (translation: Wacky Races) which was built around the theme of Formula 1. In the year 2002, their only live album, Mirigy Nagydíj was recorded, which featured their Flúgos Futam concert. 2003 saw the release of ValóságShokk which made fun of reality TV. In 2004, Irigy Hónaljmirigy released Bazi nagy lagzi which parodied a style of Hungarian popular music known as mulatós, in Hungary, especially popular in the country's Romani community) 2005 saw the release of Retro Klub which parodied classic Hungarian rock bands and musicians (LGT, Omega, Charlie etc.), as well as Daléria, their first compilation album. In 2007, IHM released K.O.Média (a pun on the Hungarian world for "comedy"), which was built around the theme of celebrities and talent shows. They released 20 év 10 kedvence in 2010, which featured a compilation of their earlier songs, along with some new ones. The last studio album of IHM was 2014's Válogatás nélküli lemez.

Former Irigy Hónaljmirigy member Zoltán "Zoli" Ambrus died in 2019 with lung respiratory cancer. He was 54 years old.

== Members ==
Current members

- Péter "Peti" Sipos - vocals (1990–present)
- Tamás "Tomi" Sipos - vocals
- Ferenc Papp - guitar (1991–present)
- László "Laci" Kabai - drums and percussion (1990–present)
- Imre "Imi" Molnár - bass guitar, backing vocals (1990–present)
- László "Uszi" Uszkó - synthesizer and keyboards (1991–present)
- Antal "Atom" Csarnoki - guitar (2011–present)
- Győző Varga - vocals

Former members

- Zoltán "Zoli" Ambrus - guitar, vocals (1990-2012, died in 2019)
- Attila Várszegi (1990-1991)
- Gábor "Katec" Katona (1990-1991)

== Discography ==
Studio albums

- 1994 - Fetrengés
- 1996 - A csillagok háborognak
- 1998 - Snassz Vegasz
- 1999 - Selejtező
- 2000 - Ráncdalfesztivál
- 2001 - Flúgos Futam
- 2003 - ValóságShokk
- 2004 - Bazi nagy lagzi
- 2005 - Retro Klub
- 2007 - K.O.Média
- 2010 - 20 év 10 kedvence
- 2014 - Válogatás nélküli lemez

== Other releases ==
Live albums

- 2002 - Mirigy Nagydíj

EP-s

- 1997 - Buliwood
- 1999 - Sovány Vegasz

Demos

- 1993 - Emezoldal - Mirigy-Mix 1.
- 1993 - Amazoldal - Mirigy Mix 2.
