= Suckless.org =

Community of programmers

suckless
- Founder: Anselm R. Garbe
- Type: Community
- Purpose: Free software, Software minimalism
- Products: dwm, st, surf, and other tools
- Website: suckless.org

suckless.org is a free software community of programmers working on projects with a focus on minimalism, simplicity, clarity, and frugality. The group developed the dwm and wmii window managers, surf, tabbed, and other programs that are said to adhere strictly to the Unix philosophy of "doing one thing and doing it well". The development team follows the "Worse is better" principle and adheres to the KISS principle ("Keep it simple, stupid").

== History ==
The suckless community was founded by Anselm R. Garbe in 2006. He became a vocal proponent of the suckless philosophy, saying that "a lot [of what] went wrong in the IT industry recently [...] be recognized in order to rethink the common practice, and perhaps to think about the time when Moore's law stops being a valid assumption." The suckless manifesto deplores the common tendency for "complex, error-prone and slow software [that] seems to be prevalent in the present-day software industry", and argues that a programmer's performance should not be measured by the number of lines of code they write.

In October 2006, Garbe registered the domain suckless.org to replace 10kloc.org and wmii.de.

In 2007, Garbe called for the need for a "Plan 9 lover's and C hacker Ubuntu" which comes packed with dwm/wmii and all necessary tools for developing C code and suggested calling it 9ubuntu. Suckless later developed stali (static Linux), an operating system with statically linked executables that adheres to the suckless principles.

== Projects ==
- dwm – window manager
- dmenu – keyboard-driven menu utility
- ii – IRC client
- sbase – UNIX core utilities
- surf – web browser based on WebKitGTK
- wmii – window manager
- st – lightweight, 256 colour-enabled (with 24-bit colour support) terminal emulator
- stali – static Linux distribution

== Conferences ==
Starting in 2013 the suckless.org community organizes annual conferences and hackathon gatherings focusing on technical topics and socializing with community members, commonly referred to as "SLCon" (short for "SuckLess Conference").

=== suckless.org e.V. ===
In 2015 the legal entity suckless.org e.V. was founded during the suckless conference. Its aim and main purpose is supporting the projects of suckless.org and open source in general.
