= Parno Graszt =

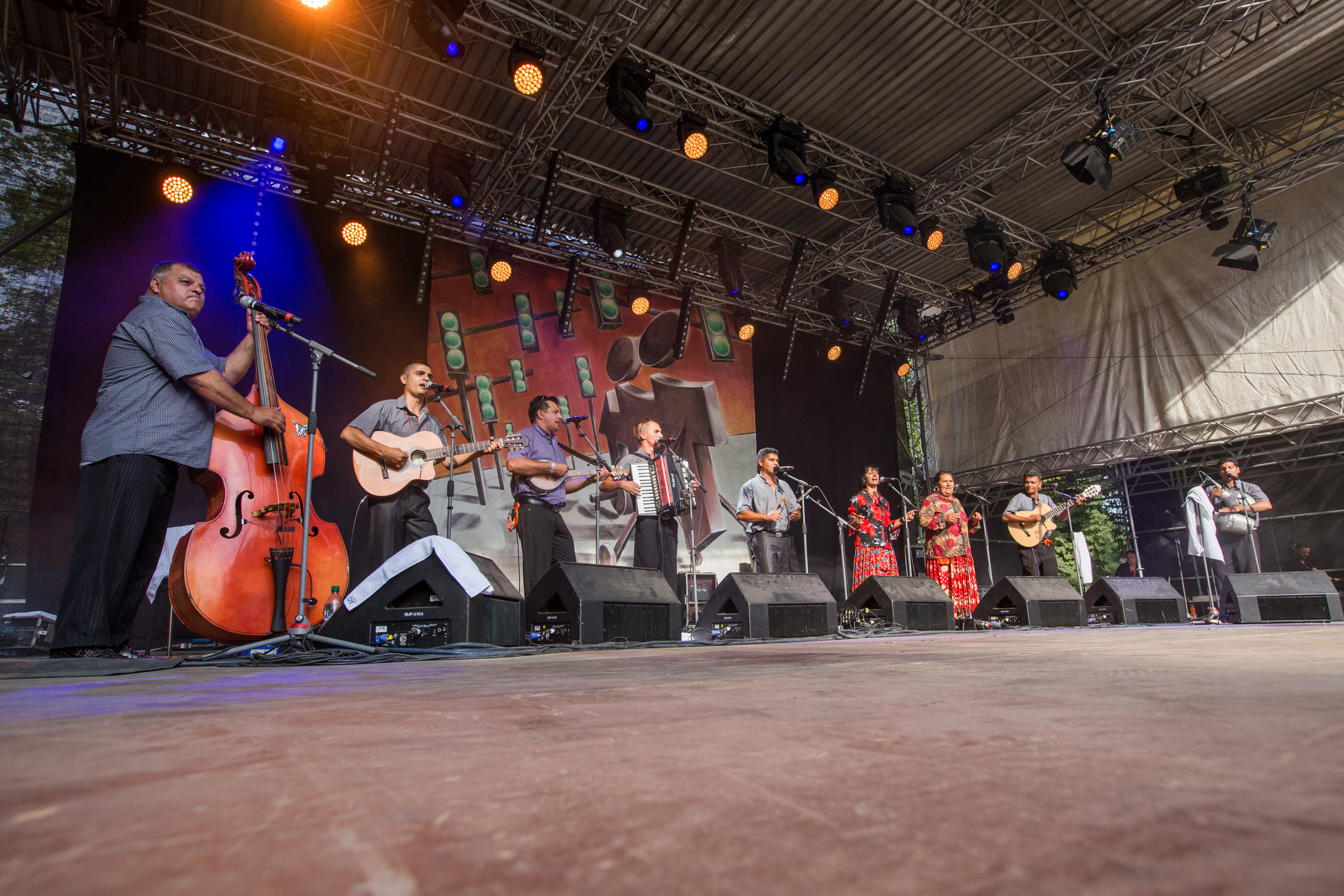
- Parno Graszt (2014)

Background information
- Origin: Paszab, Hungary
- Genres: Roma
- Years active: 1987–present
- Website: www.parnograszt.com

Parno Graszt is a Roma music ensemble from Paszab, Hungary founded in 1987. "Parno Grast" means "white horse" in the Romani language, with "graszt" using the Hungarian orthography 'sz' for 's'. In the Roma culture white is a symbol of purity and horses are a symbol of freedom. Their debut album Hit the piano reached Number 7 on the World Music Chart Europe in October 2002. In 2004 Hungarian Television and the BBC produced a music documentary about Parno Graszt. After their second album, Járom az utam (2004), Parno Graszt was voted in the top 10 for "best artist of the year", 2005, by the Swiss music magazine Vibrations. In 2016, they competed in A Dal, the national final selection for Hungary in the Eurovision Song Contest with the song Már nem szédülök, and reached the final.

== Members ==
- József Oláh (vocals, guitar, tambura)
- Géza Balogh (vocals, guitar, dance)
- Viktor Oláh (vocals, guitar, dance)
- Sándor Horváth (vocals, spoons, dance)
- Heléna Oláh (vocals)
- János Jakocska (vocals, guitar)
- Mária Váradi (vocals, dance)
- Mária Balogh (vocals, dance)
- Krisztián Oláh (accordion)
- János Oláh (double bass)[deceased]
- István Németh (oral bass, churn)

== Discography ==
- Rávágok a zongorára (2002) (Hit the Piano)
- Járom az utam (2004) (I'm On My Way)
- Ez a világ nekem való (2007) (This World Is Made for Me)
- Reggelig mulatok (2011) (I Revel Till the Break of Dawn)
- "Suttog a szél" (2024) ("The Wind Whispers")
