= Sbase =

sbase
- Developers: Connor Lane Smith, Dimitris Papastamos, Laslo Hunhold, Hiltjo Posthuma, et al.
- Written in: C
- Operating system: Unix-like
- License: MIT License
- Website: core.suckless.org/sbase/

sbase is a set of programs developed by suckless.org that implements several portable UNIX tools in a minimal way according to POSIX specifications. It is used in Google's Fuchsia operating system to provide standard UNIX utilities.
