= A38 (venue) =

Coordinates: 47°28′35.23″N 19°3′46.70″E

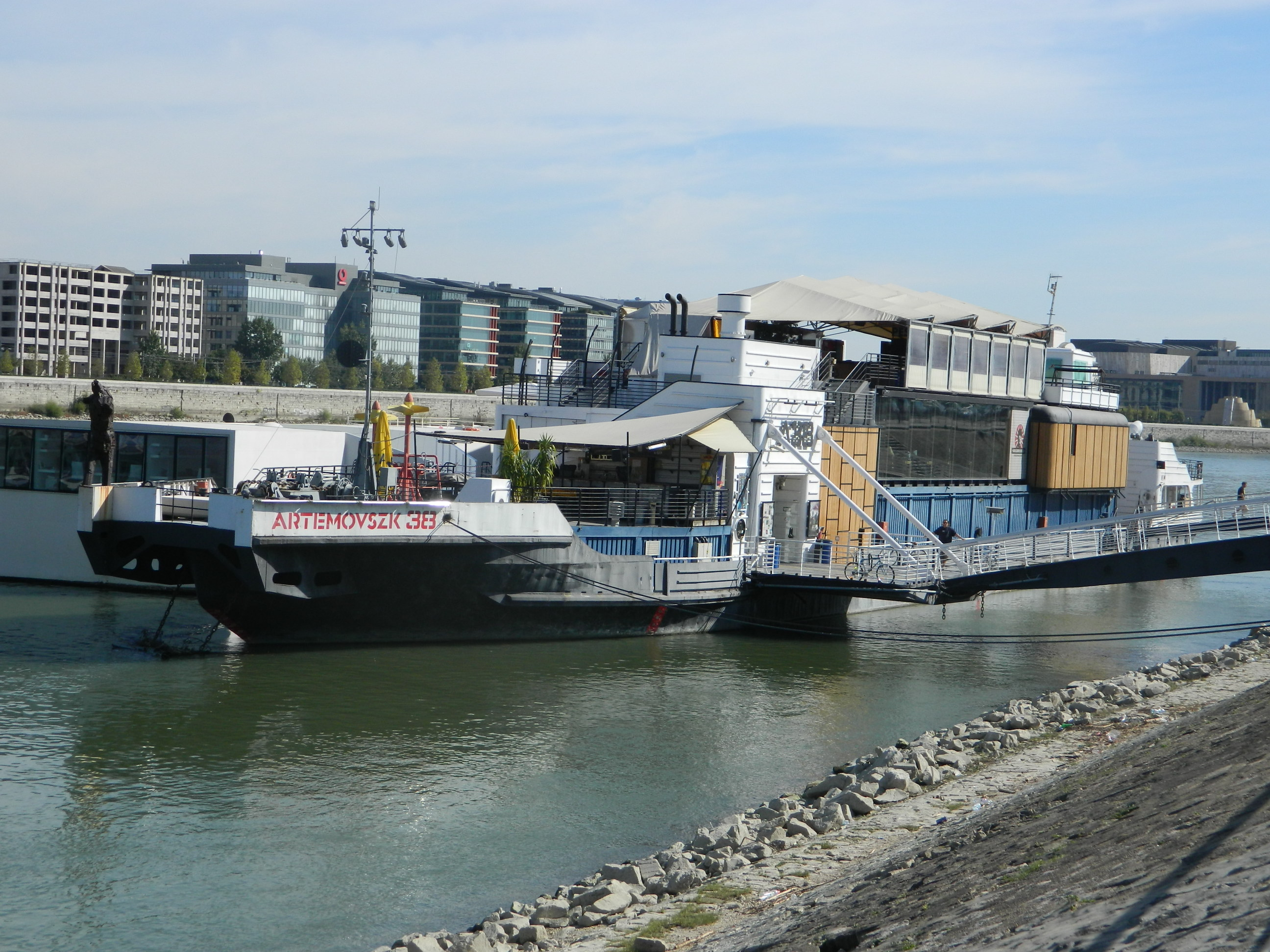
The A38 in 2011

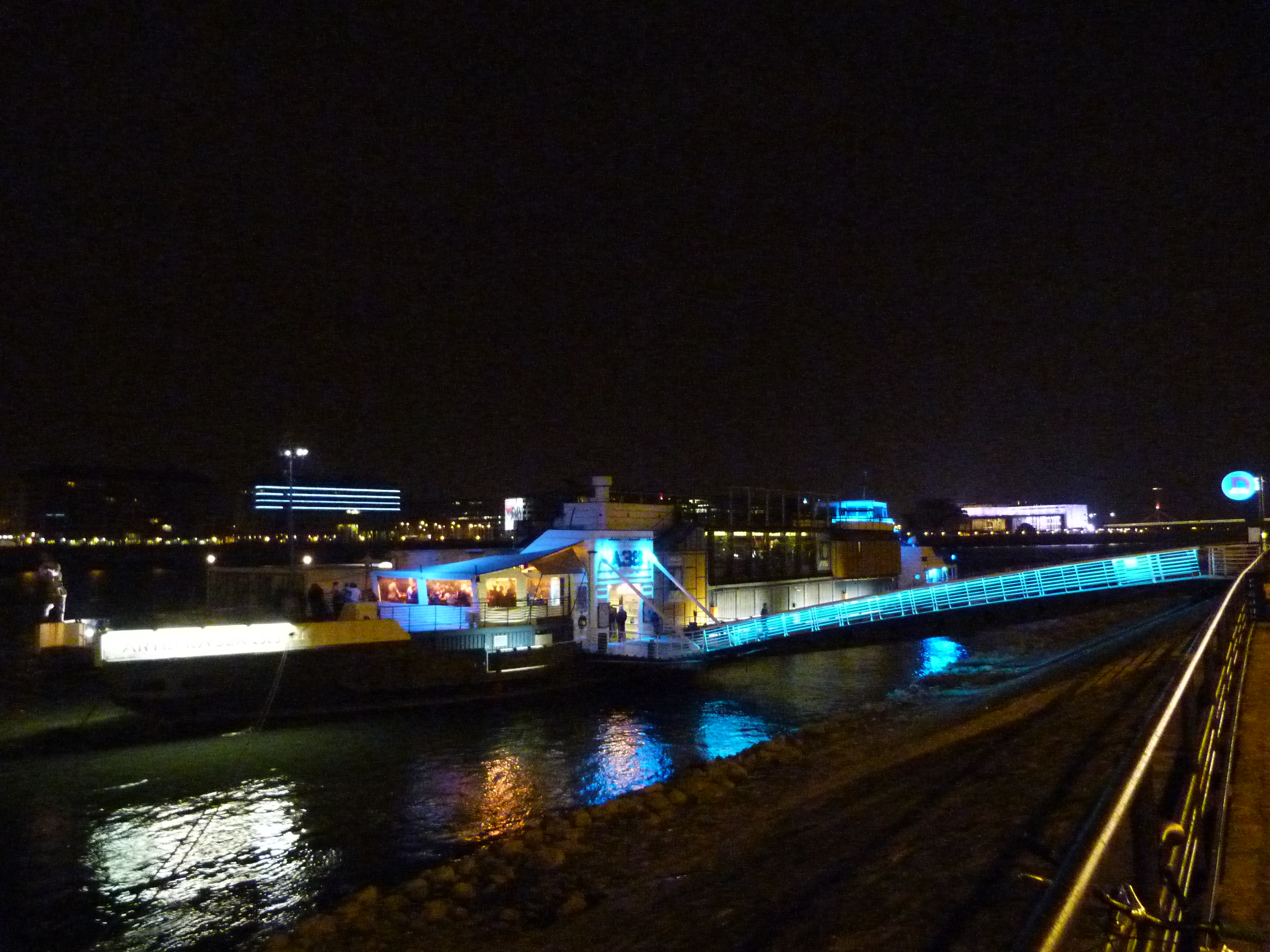
A38 ship at New Year's Eve 2013

A38 is an entertainment and cultural venue on the Danube river in Budapest, Hungary, opened on 30 April 2003. Its structure repurposes a decommissioned stone-carrier ship that operated in Ukraine and is now anchored permanently to the bottom of Petőfi Bridge. The venue variously encompasses a ruin bar, restaurant, exhibition hall, dancefloor, and concert hall.

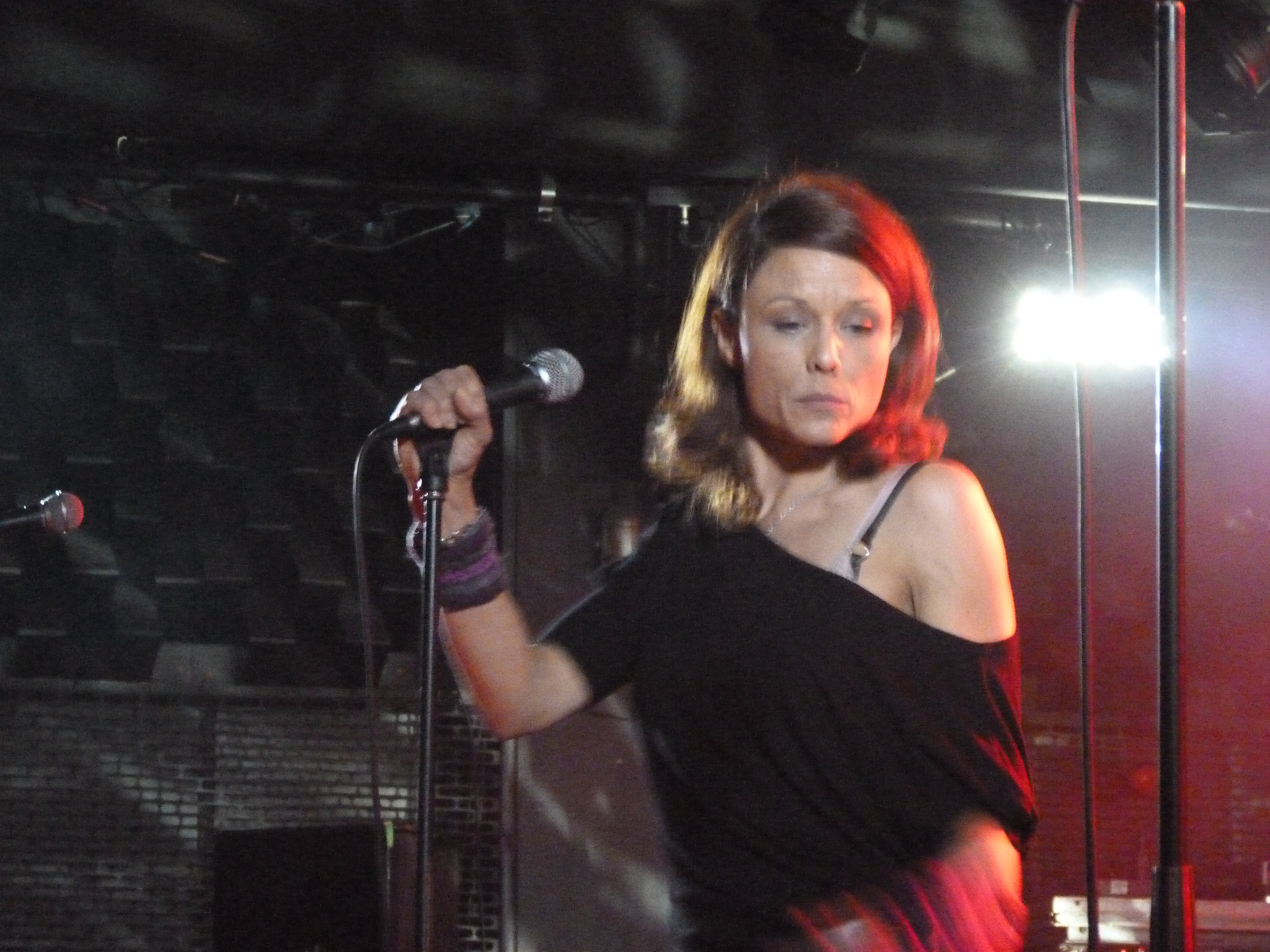
Gabriella Hänninen - elektroswing on board

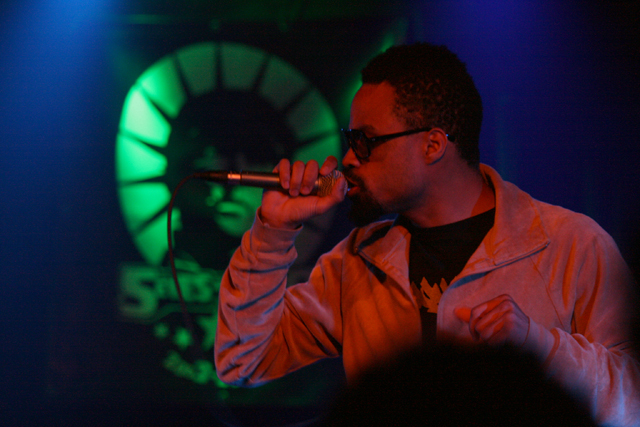
Bilal performing at the concert hall in 2008

The A38 is a member of the Trans Europe Halles organization.

== Reception ==
The travel guide publisher Lonely Planet has voted A38 the "Best Bar in the World" in an online poll. Travel writer Craig Turp ranks it number one on his list of the top-10 clubs in Budapest, writing in Top 10 Budapest (2010): "Budapest's top dance venue is located on a ship moored on the Danube. There are three floors to choose from – the upper deck terrace for listening to the latest mellow sounds, the lower deck-level restaurant and the concert and dance hall below. A38 is also popular for classical and rock concerts, held in the hold."

According to the guide website Ruin Bars Budapest, the venue is "one of the best places for non-mainstream music lovers in Budapest with its rich concert programmes ... it outperforms itself by offering cool original and tribute concerts ... it is a community place ... a cultural venue offering a wide range of jazz, punk, world, electronic, contemporary, rock music along with various cultural events (film clubs, gastronomy events etc)".

== See also ==
- Upcycling
