= Compact Disco =

Hungarian electronic music band

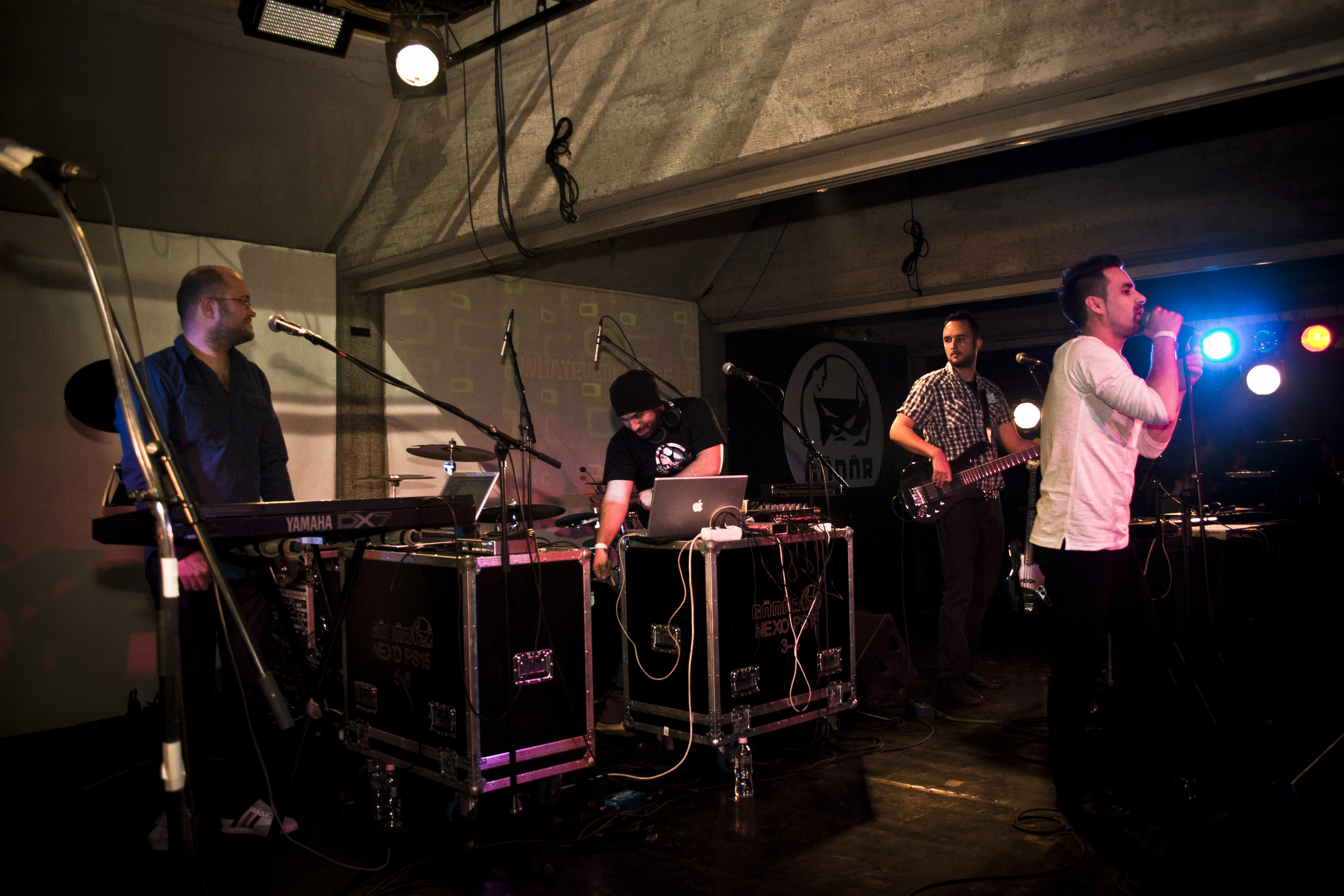
- Compact Disco in 2010 from left to right: Gábor Pál, Behnam Lotfi, Attila Sándor and Csaba Walkó

Background information
- Origin: Budapest, Hungary
- Genres: Electropop, synthpop
- Years active: 2008–present
- Label: CLS Music
- Members: Behnam Lotfi; Gábor Pál; Csaba Walkó
- Past members: Attila Sándor

Compact Disco is a Hungarian electronic music band and musical producer trio based in Budapest, founded in 2008 by three musicians of varying musical backgrounds. The band represented Hungary in the Eurovision Song Contest 2012 in Baku, Azerbaijan.

== History ==
=== Origins ===
Lotfi, Pál and Walkó first met in 2005, when Behnam Lotfi's techno producer duo, Collins and Behnam planned to produce a cover version of Adamski and Seal's Killer and was in search of a vocalist. He saw Csaba Walkó in an American Idol type talent show and asked him to sing the vocals for the cover. Walkó that time was singing in a funk-pop band called Brownfield and asked a couple of members of this band to accompany him to the recording session. One of these members were Gábor Pál, who was also the leader and founder of the renowned Hungarian nu-jazz ensemble, Toy Division. This was the first time when the three musicians met.

But it was not until the summer of 2008, when Lotfi pitched the idea of a band playing electronic vocal pop music to Walkó, who asked his keyboardist, Pál to join them. The three had their first meeting in August 2008, and they instantly started to produce their first song (later to be titled Fly or Dive).

They were composing and producing songs until March 2009. By this time everything was recorded, except the vocal tracks. The band started the studio sessions to finalize its yet unnamed first album in April 2009, recording the vocals, and mixing and mastering the complete recording. They were in Gábor Némethy's (aka. Collins, also a member of Collins & Behnam) Groovejack Studio until July 2009.

After album was finished – and by this time the band has finally agreed on the Compact Disco name, and the album title Stereoid – Hungarian independent record label, CLS Music (then called CLS Records) showed interest in releasing it, and in September 2009 they agreed upon the details and the album was released in December.

=== Concerts and II ===
The band started to perform live in January 2010, mostly in Hungary, but also in Transylvania, Romania. Their first video for the song I'm in Love gained considerable popularity, and it reached at least top ten position in various Hungarian dance charts. The video was shot shortly before the release of the first album in November 2009. It was produced by Hungarian independent video and commercial maker group, Studio X.

Shortly after the Stereoid's release, Compact Disco has been nominated to the 2010 Fonogram Awards in the category "Best Performance in Electronic Music"

In May 2010, the group shot its second video to the second single "Without You" again with Studio X behind the scenes. Although "I'm in Love"'s video gained popularity over time, the Hungarian audience failed to recognize the fresh faces believing it was the work of a foreign band. Therefore, they decided on a so-called "image video" picturing only the band.

In the same month, another nomination came along, Bravo magazine nominated the band to its Hungarian 2010 Otto Awards in the category "Best New Artist", and the band was to do and acoustic show in the "Akusztik" series on Magyar Rádió's pop music channel, MR2 Petőfi. The session was recorded before live audience in Magyar Rádió's Studio 8 and was aired in September creating demand for more "Akusztik-type" shows.

During the summer festival season, Compact Disco made an appearance at almost all major Hungarian music festivals, and has been asked to cover Ákos in the Hungarian MTV Icon series. For these, they asked Pál and Walkó's former bandmate from Brownfield, bassist Attila Sándor to join the band on stage, and in November 2010 he became the fourth member of Compact Disco. Occasionally a drummer was also performing the band in selected venues. Also in November 2010, on Red Bull's request they shot their third video to their song "Fly or Dive", once again with Studio X.

During the year, "I'm in Love" and its remixes entered various charts including the UK Buzz Chart, Swiss DJ Chart reaching top 40 positions. The track also topped the Hungarian dance chart, The VIVA Club Chart. Acclaimed DJs all around the world including Tiësto, Ferry Corsten, Alex Gaudino, Oliver Lang, Mischa Daniels, Henry John Morgan, Chris Finan, Ant Nichols, and Paul Ughes incorporated the track in their acts and shows.

The band was also asked to remix songs for several Hungarian artist, including folk-pop band, Holdviola's "Erdő, erdő" and their hit "Bánat utca" which became a club sensation, and for popular Hungarian solo artist, Ákos's second single, "A fénybe nézz" from his 2010 album.

In November 2010, after four weeks of voting, the band won the popular award MTV brand:new on November 15 with the help of their own viral video series "Segíts Antosnak" (Hungarian: "Help Antos!"), which was praised by the PR-community. On December 6, 2010 the band re-released its debut album, Stereoid as a free digital download.

The cover of II

In December 2010, the band started working on their second album, titled II. It was recorded in Compact Disco's home studio, except for the vocals which was recorded again in Groovejack Studio in April 2011 and mixed and mastered by Gábor Deutsch of Anorganik-fame in Berlin. The album was expected to be released on May 14, 2011. The first single of the track is Feel The Rain, which peaked at No. 2 on MR2 Petőfi Rádió's Top 30. From this point, the band's logo was redesigned to fit in with the new album's cover. The cover was designed by Sándor.

Before the album's release, as a sign signs of growing popularity in Hungary, the band was nominated for several awards, and won some of it. In January 2011 Compact Disco was nominated in three categories ("Best Performance in Electronic Music", "Best New Artist", "Best Song") for the 2011 Fonogram Awards. The band won the 2011 Fonogram Award for "Best Performance in Electronic Music" on March 2, 2011. On April 24 Compact Disco won the 2011 Antropos.hu Award for "Album of the Year 2010" after a four-month-long popular voting period. Also in April 2011 the band was nominated for VIVA Hungary's Comet award for 'Band of the Year 2010'.

Age Media signed the first three singles from "Stereoid" to release it worldwide, so did Universal Music for Romania and Bulgaria sometime in 2011.

In May 2011, Red Bull Hungary organized a special event to celebrate the bicentennial of the famous Hungarian composer and virtuoso, Franz Liszt's birth, called Liszt Remix. For this, four Hungarian bands were asked to rethink, remix and incorporate some of Liszt's oevre into their three or four piece performance. Compact Disco chose the Hungarian Rhapsody No. 2, which was made into an uptempo drum and bass piece and Liebestraum No. 3, which was incorporated into their song, Feel The Rain as an intro. As a bonus, they rearranged their second single from Stereoid, Without You into a classical orchestration, and this was recorded as well upon MR2 Petőfi Rádió's request to be played on air, and this song received heavy airplay.

This year, the band remixed famous Serbian Hungarian artist, Zorán's new single, Kóló.

=== Eurovision Song Contest 2012 ===
By the end of 2011, Compact Disco decided entered in the newly created and recently announced Hungarian national selection contest, A Dal to represent Hungary in the 2012 Eurovision Song Contest to get some wider exposure internationally in case of winning the contest. Since none of their songs from the recently released album, II could be qualified according to ESC rules, they entered the race with a brand new song titled Sound of Our Hearts. This song was co-produced by Krisztián Szakos, acclaimed Hungarian, music producer, composer and multi-instrumentalist and was recorded in his Baraka Studio.

The national selection was held in January and February 2011. The band qualified for the final after receiving 39 of the possible 40 points. In the two stage final, they won the second stage of four members by 2-1-1-0 votes.

Compact Disco invited guest musicians for A Dal and subsequently to ESC 2012 to fill the 6 member quota: Krisztián Szakos, the co-producer of the song and singer Helga Wéber, former lead singer of popular Hungarian pop band, Unisex for primary backing vocals. Secondary backing vocals were performed by keyboardist Gábor Pál.

Winning the national competition boosted their popularity immensely resulting in the song reaching numerous two on the Hungarian Top 40 chart– where it stayed for 45 weeks – and a significant rise in demand for live performances.

Before the song contest, the band participated in the annual Eurovision in Concert in Amsterdam, the Netherlands and the Eurovision Party in London. Israel's national television also invited them to perform their song.

In Baku they performed in the first semi-final finishing in 10th place and qualifying for the final. There they finished 24th of 26 finalist and 42 entrants.

After the song contest the popularity of the band remained high filling the summer concert schedule almost fully. Szakos also appeared at some of the larger performances as a guest. The band released its last single from II, Leave It Up To Me. The single version is featuring MC Columbo, acclaimed Hungarian raga MC. A social video was shot for the single, where fans sent videos of themselves "performing" the song.

For the international market a compilation album titled ‘2.5’ was released containing songs from Stereoid and II. It was remixed, remastered, and partially reproduced by Krisztián Szakos.

During this intensive summer period, tensions arose between Attila Sándor and the three founding members regarding the future of the band and each individuals role in it. At the very beginning of the band's two-month hiatus starting in mid-September 2012, these debates culminated in the decision that Compact Disco will prepare and start its Autumn-Winter 2012 Tour and continue afterwards without Sándor, becoming a three-piece again.

After the split and during the preparation for the upcoming tour with fellow Hungarian band The Carbonfools, Lotfi, Pál, and Walkó agreed upon revamping the live band with the addition of session musicians. They held auditions drummers and bassist in Walkó's musical alma mater and selected Emese Török as drummer and András Áldott as bassist. While the Áldott remained with the band only until the end of the year, Török remained, and she still is a permanent session musician ever since.

In December 2012, Compact Disco was invited to Tirana, Albania to perform as a special guest in one of the semi-finals of the national selection show for Eurovision Song Contest 2013. Also this month they released a video portraying their travels and exploits during the ESC adventure accompanied by their song, Fly With You.

=== 'The Storm’ and onwards ===
In January 2013, Compact Disco started to work on their third album. This album was produced in a significantly different manner than the previous two: based on their cooperation on Sound Of Our Hearts, Krisztián Szakos was asked to produce this third album. Contrary to the earlier albums, it was not produced by Compact Disco, only pre-produced to a lesser extent.

Since their previous contract with CLS Music expired and they could not come to an agreement, they parted ways amicably. In March, Compact Disco signed a one album record deal with Tom Tom Records.

The first single of this album was We Will Not Go Down, released in May 2012 and reaching top 10 positions again on different charts in Hungary. In sync with their previous musical gags, its instrumental wamp plays an homage to the sound of Depeche Mode. It was followed by The Storm in September for which the band shot its biggest music video to date, produced and directed by Berlin Music Video Awards nominee Miki 357.

During the spring and summer of 2013, the band continued to tour in Hungary. The minor concerts were performed by the base band, but major concerts were performed by a four-piece live band with the addition of session drummer Török. Occasionally, just as in 2012, Krisztián Szakos appeared as a guest guitarist.

The album The Storm was released in November 2013 which was followed by a tour. Since this tour, Compact Disco performs almost exclusively with two additional session musicians, Emese Török on drums and Krisztina Lahucsky on guitars. Before the tour, the band started to look for guitarists and Török suggested Lahucsky from a previous band of hers where they played together and also from a theater gig, where they were both members of an all-female rock band. This personnel remained in 2014 as well.

In 2014 the record contract expired with Tom Tom Records and Compact Disco decided not to renew. In fact they decided not to release any albums as a concept in the near future only singles and EPs which can later be collected to an album after their individual release. For this concept they signed a one-year contract with major Hungarian record label Magneoton in May 2014.

In March 2014, Compact Disco performed a one-off, two-hour acoustic show in Budapest's famous concert hall, Palace of Arts as the third guest in the monthly acoustic concert series "MR2 Akusztik+ a MüPából", jointly organized by Palace Of Arts and Petőfi Rádió, recorded and later broadcast by Hungarian Public Television. The band totally rearranged 20 songs into different genres and had a guest session musicians on double bass, András Csizmás, and had multiple special guests including world famous tuba master, Roland Szentpáli, popular Hungarian singers Magdi Rúzsa, MC Columbo; acclaimed jazz musicians, singer Zita Gereben and guitarist Bálint Gyémánt; and the choir of the Hungarian Army.

After the mixed reception of their third album, Lotfi, Pál, and Walkó decided to return to the original producing concept. In June 2014, they released their first post-The Storm single and second non-album single, Ms. Right. As a tradition of Compact Disco, the instrumental wamp salutes Bronski Beat's "Smalltown Boy".

== Members ==
=== Current members ===
- Behnam Lotfi – loops, grooves, additional tracks, effects (2008–present)
- Gábor Pál – keyboards (2008–present)
- Csaba Walkó – vocals (2008–present)

=== Former members ===
- Attila Sándor – bass (2010–2012)

=== Guests and session musicians ===
Name	Instrument	Period
Attila Sándor	bass	2010
Péter Somos	drums	2010
Helga Wéber	backing vocals	2012
Krisztián Szakos	guitars	2012–2013
Emese Török	drums	2012–present
András Áldott	bass	2012
Krisztina Lahucsky	guitars	2013–present

== Discography ==
=== Albums ===
Year	Title	Label
2009	Stereoid	CLS Music (Hungary)
2011	II	CLS Music (Hungary)
2012	Two Point Five	Mole Listening Pearls (Austria) (Germany) (Switzerland)
2013	The Storm	Tom Tom Records (Hungary)
2018	Compact Disco 4.	Magneoton (Hungary)

=== Singles ===
Year	Title	Peak chart positions			Certifications	Album
Year	Title	BEL Tip	HUN Dance	HUN	Certifications	Album
2009	"I'm in Love"	-	2	-		Stereoid
2010	"Without You"	-	-	-		Stereoid
2010	"Fly Or Dive"	-	-	-		Stereoid
2011	"Feel the Rain"	-	29	7		II
2012	"Sound of Our Hearts"	83	20	2		Two Point Five
2012	"Leave it Up to Me" (feat. MC Columbo)	-	26	28		II
2012	"Fly With You"	-	-	9		II
2013	"We Will Not Go Down"	-	-	9		The Storm
2013	"The Storm"	-	-	6		The Storm
2013	"You Don't Care"	-	-	-		The Storm
2014	"Ms. Right"	-	-	-		(single only)

=== Other releases ===
Year	Title	Label	Countries
2010	Without You (remixes)	CLS Music	(Hungary)
2011	Fly or Dive	Age Media	(United Kingdom) worldwide
2011	Without You	Age Media	(United Kingdom) worldwide
2012	The Plan	CLS Music	(United Kingdom) worldwide

=== Remixes by Compact Disco ===
Year	Artist	Song
2009	Odett és a Go Girlz	Móló
2010	Holdviola	Bánat utca
2010	Holdviola	Erdő, erdő
2010	Ákos	A fénybe nézz
2011	Zorán	Kóló

== Awards and nominations ==
Year	Award	Category	Result
2010	Fonogram Awards	Best Performance in Electronic Music	Nominated
2010	Bravo Otto Awards	Best New Artist	Nominated
2010	MTV brand:new	6th brand:new band	Nominated
2011	Fonogram Awards	Best Performance in Electronic Music	Won
2011	Fonogram Awards	Best New Artist	Nominated
2011	Fonogram Awards	Best Song (I'm in Love)	Nominated
2011	Antropos.hu Awards	Album of the Year 2010	Won
2011	VIVA Comet	Band of the Year 2010	Nominated
2011	MTV Europe Music Awards	Best Local Artist – Hungary	Won
2011	MTV Europe Music Awards	Worldwide Act – European Nominee	Nominated
2012	Fonogram Awards	Best Performance in Electronic Music	Nominated
2012	Fonogram Awards	Best Song (Feel The Rain)	Nominated
2015	Fonogram Awards	Best Release in Electronic Music	Nominated

== See also ==
- Hungarian pop
- Hungarian rock
- Eurovision Song Contest 2012

Awards and achievements
Preceded by Kati Wolf with "What About My Dreams?"	Hungary in the Eurovision Song Contest; 2012	Succeeded by ByeAlex with "Kedvesem"
