= Szimpla Kert =

Building in Budapest, Hungary

General information
- Location: 47.4970°N 19.0634°E

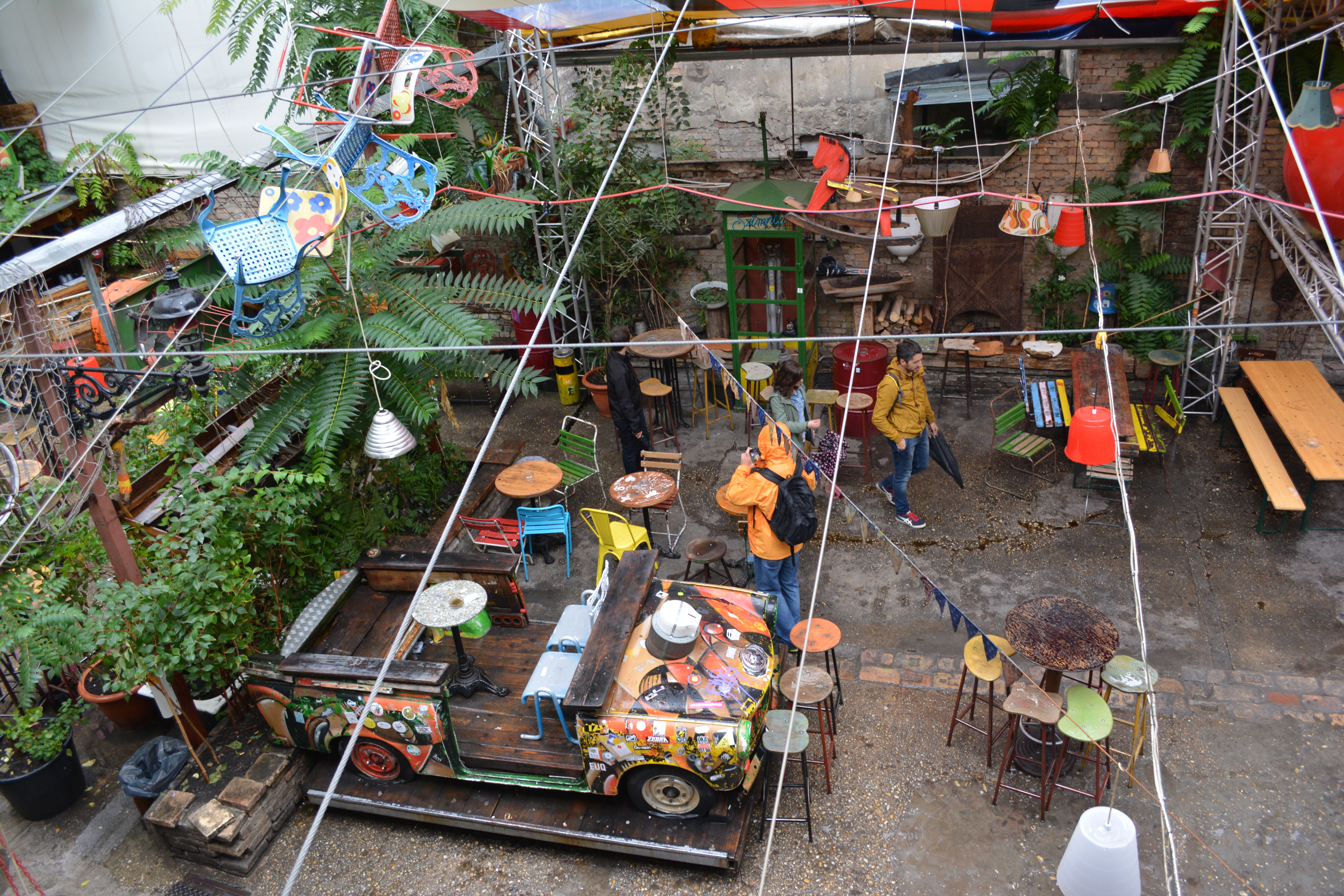
Szimpla Kert Trabant

Szimpla Kert is a ruin bar or romkocsma, which means "Simple Garden" in Hungarian, located in the Jewish Quarter of the 7th district of Budapest, Hungary. It is considered the pioneer of ruin bars. The pub started as a place for people to find a cheap drink in a relaxed environment, but has grown to become a tourist attraction and community center. Movie showings, live music performances, an art gallery, the Kazinczy Living Library, the Szimpla Farmers' Market, and the Szimpla Bringa bicycle flea market are just a few of the community activities that are held at the bar.

== History ==
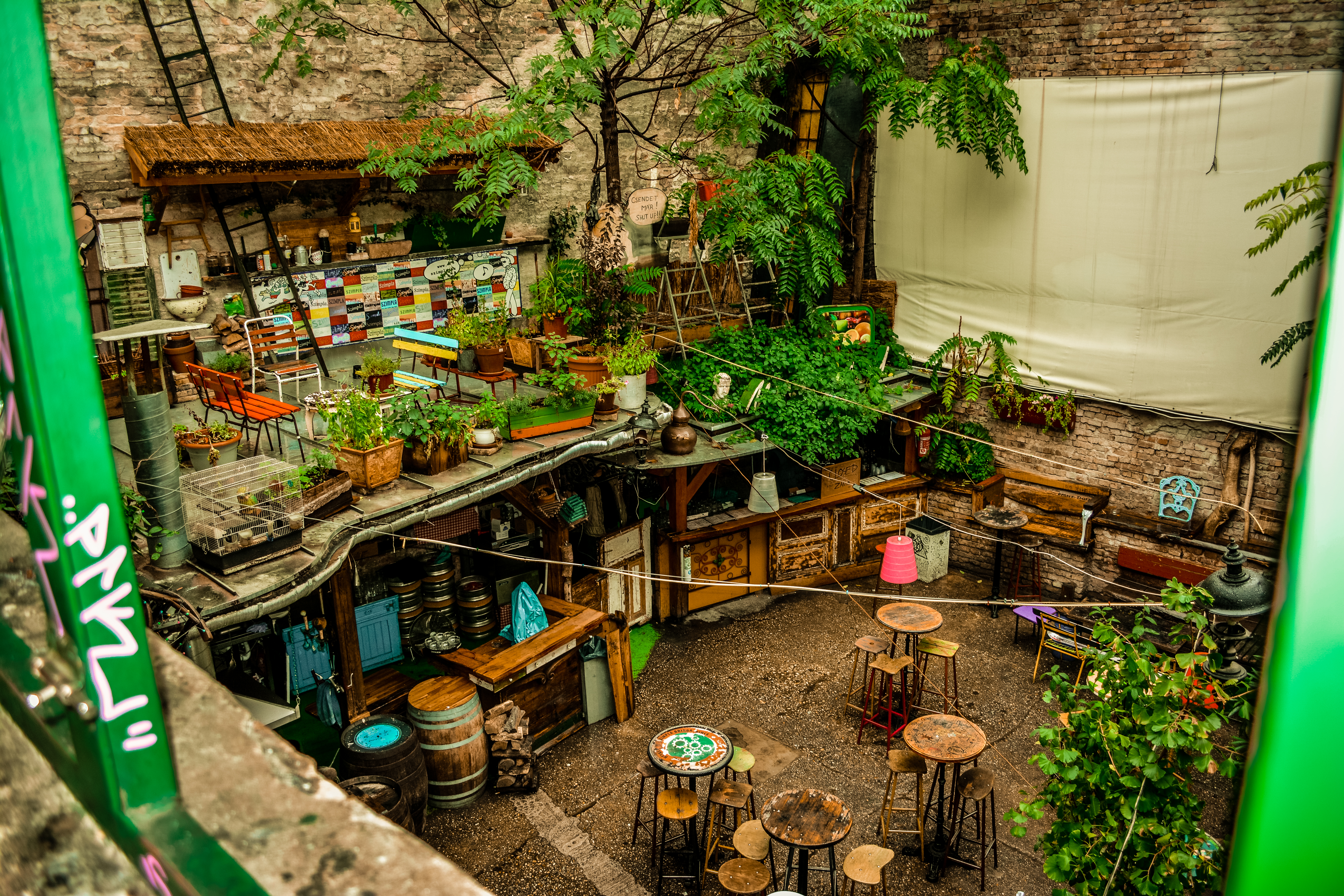
Szimpla Kert Open-air Theater

Szimpla Kert is the first ruin pub to open in Budapest, Hungary. The Szimpla Kert originally opened in 2002 in a location a few blocks away from its current location. The idea behind the pub was to provide a relaxing environment to socialize and have a drink. In 2004, a dilapidated area located at 14 Kazinczy Street that used to be homes and a stove factory was set to be demolished. The four owners of the Szimpla Kert decided to save the area from demolition and move the pub to this location. The group of owners made this decision because the structure provided more space and the environment they were looking for. The new location opened as Szimpla Kertmozi (kertmozi translating to open-air cinema in Hungarian) because of the large courtyard on the premises that was used to watch underground and indie films.

== Tourism ==
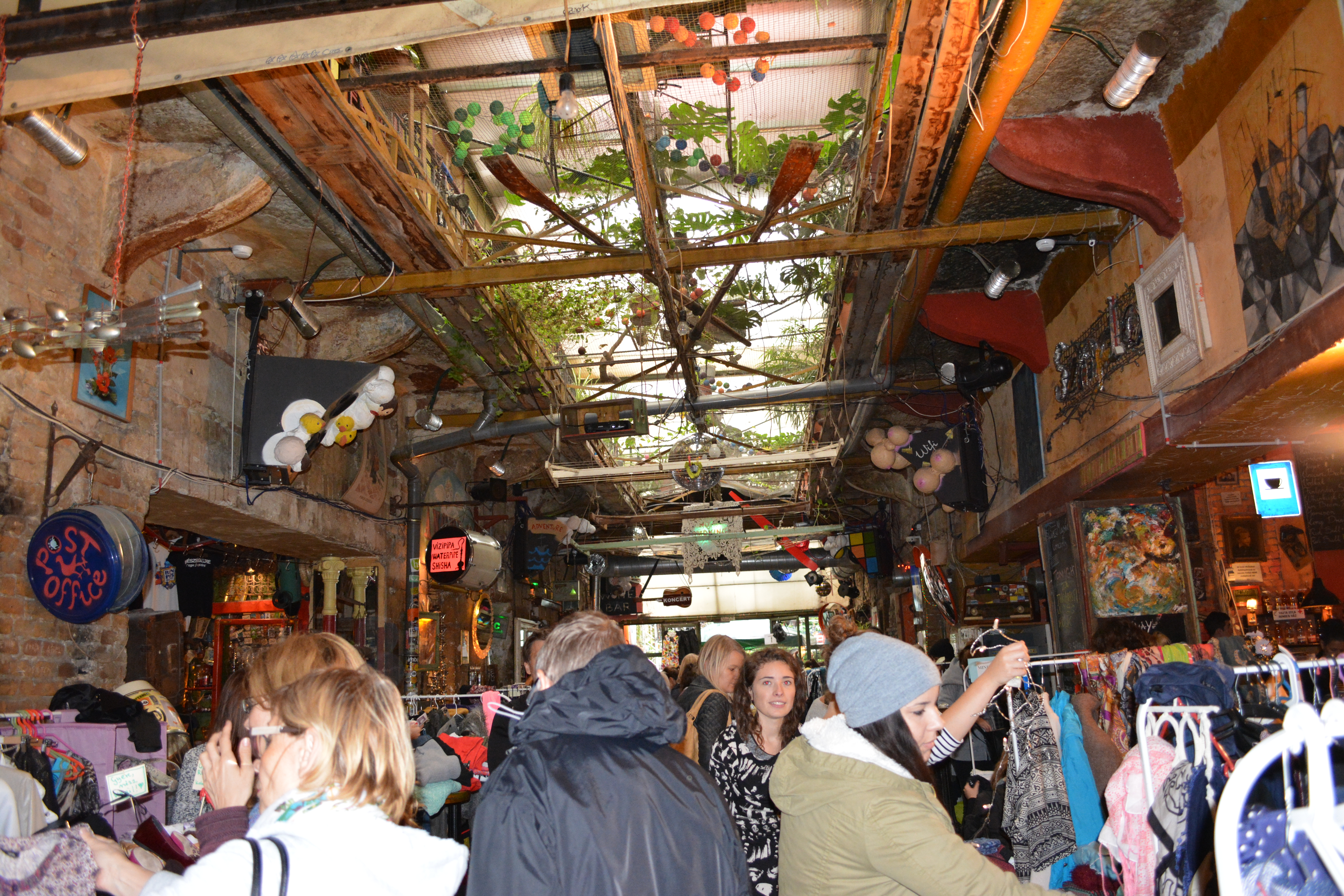
Tourists Shopping at Szimpla Kert

=== Transportation ===
The nearest bus stations are Nagy Diófa utca, Nyár utca and Uránia.

=== Popularity ===
The maximum capacity of the pub is 600 people, but it has been reported that the venue often sees 5000 people in a night, 80 percent of which are tourists. During the summer and the Sziget Festival the line to enter the pub is often longer than normal.
