= András Petruska =

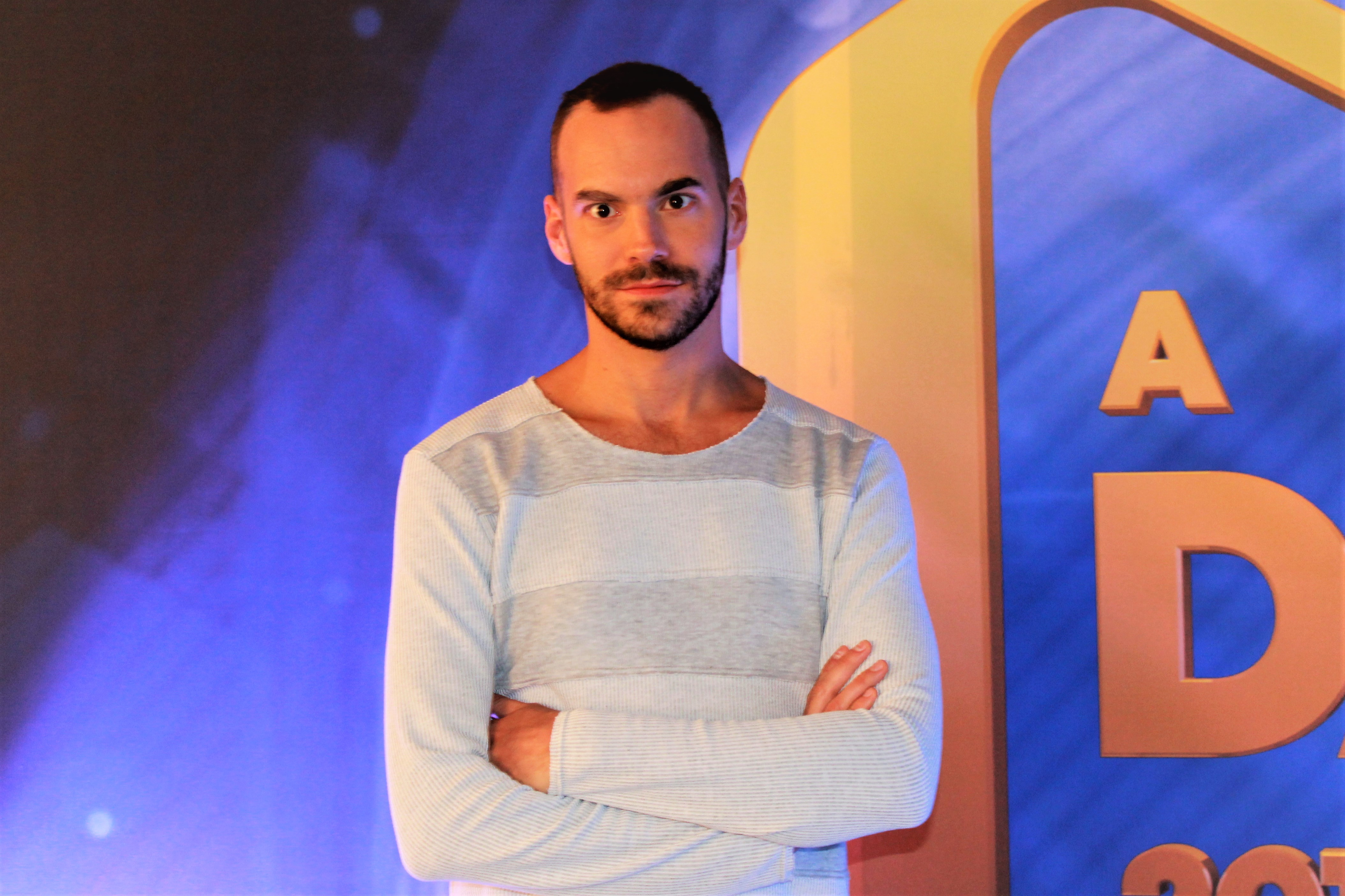
- Petruska in 2019

Background information
- Born: 19 March 1986 (age 39); Budapest, Hungary
- Genres: R&B; pop; blues
- Occupations: Singer; songwriter
- Instruments: Vocals; guitar
- Years active: 2010–present
- Website: http://petruskaandras.hu/

András Petruska (born 19 March 1986), professionally known as Petruska, is a Hungarian singer and songwriter. He is most notable for participating in A Dal 2016.

== Career ==
Petruska began playing guitar at age 9. In 2010, he won the Veszprém Street Music Festival, and the following year he toured with the orchestra for Quimby. He appeared at the TEDxYouth @ Budapest conference, appeared later in the Petofi Acoustic concert series and at Sziget Festival 2015 as well. His first album in 2014 was published by Metropolitan. A live album from the Line 4 was released. The music video for his song about Szent Gellért street made it to the final ranking for the first Hungarian Quarterly Clip Best Director category.

In 2016, Petruska attempted to represent Hungary at the Eurovision Song Contest 2016 with his song "Trouble in My Mind". He qualified for the final and made it to the superfinal. He also won the Breakthrough Award sponsored by MTVA. He again participated in A Dal, this time in the 2019 edition with the song "Help Me Out of Here". He made it to the final, but was disqualified after MTVA alleged that his song was a plagiarism of a song by Vampire Weekend, a claim which he denied. He was replaced by Gergő Oláh.

== Discography ==
=== Singles ===
- "Trouble in My Mind" (2016)
- "Help Me Out of Here" (2018)
