= Paszab =

Coordinates: 48°09′N 21°41′E

- Interactive map of Paszab
- Country: Hungary
- County: Szabolcs-Szatmár-Bereg

Area
  - Total: 12.96 km^{2} (5.00 sq mi)

Population (2015)
  - Total: 1,232
  - Density: 95.1/km^{2} (246/sq mi)
- Time zone: UTC+1 (CET)
  - Summer (DST): UTC+2 (CEST)
- Postal code: 4475
- Area code: 42

Location of Szabolcs-Szatmar-Bereg county in Hungary

Paszab is a village in Szabolcs-Szatmár-Bereg county, in the Northern Great Plain region of eastern Hungary.

== Geography ==
It covers an area of 12.96 km^{2} (5 sq mi) and has a population of 1232 people (2015).

== Culture ==
- Parno Graszt, Roma music ensemble.
