= Ruin bar =

Bar in a formerly abandoned building

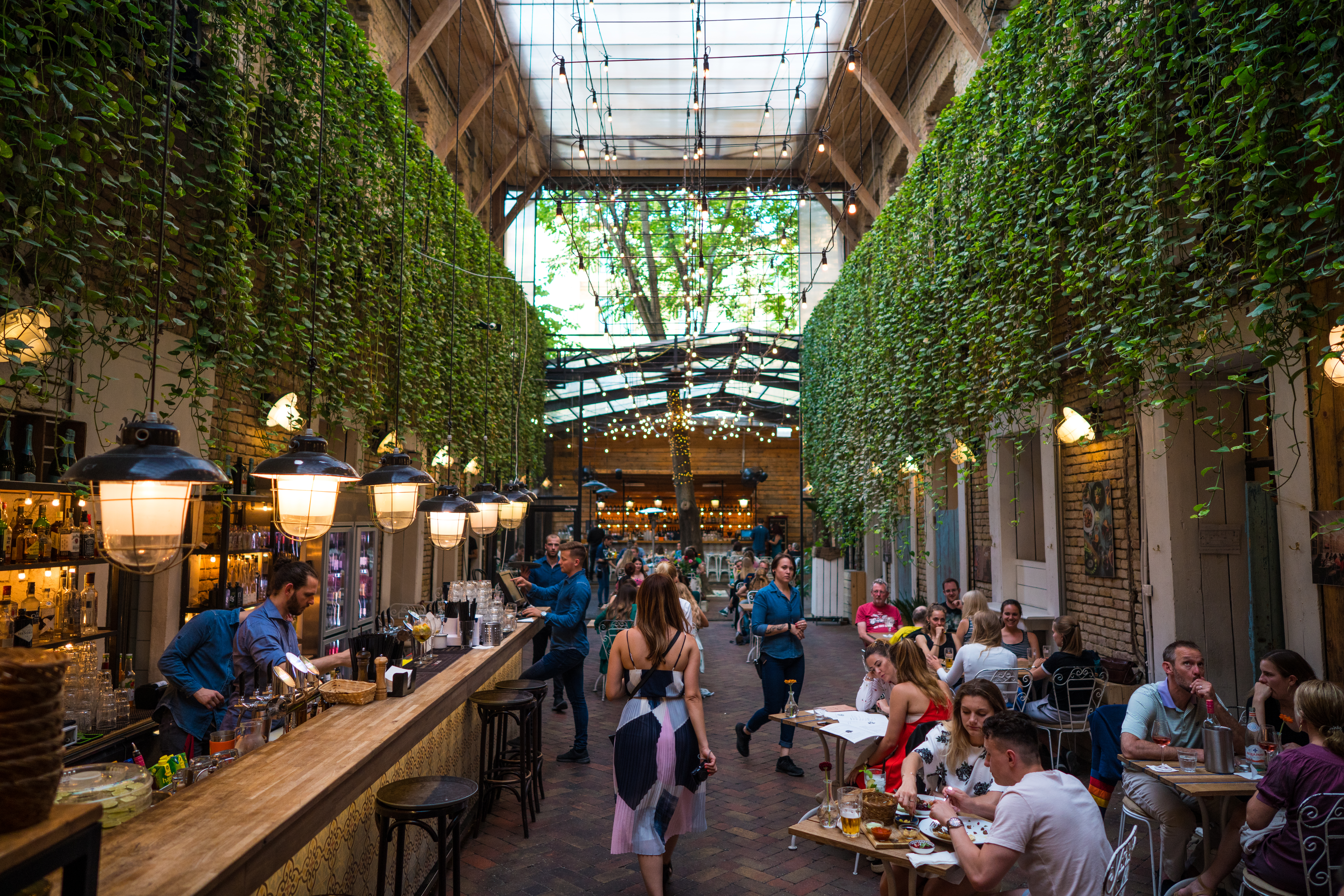
Mazel Tov Ruin Bar

Ruin bars or ruin pubs (Hungarian: romkocsmák) are bars that were former abandoned buildings and now are an integral part of Budapest's nightlife. These establishments are generally found in Budapest's Jewish Quarter.

The very first ruin bar claimed to be opened in 1999. However, the rise of ruin bars started in the early 2000s, and Szimpla Kert is widely considered to be the first pioneer. During that time, the inner part of VII District had many abandoned buildings especially in the historic Jewish Quarter. The very first venue opened on Kertész utca in 2002. In 2004, the concept increased in popularity when Ábel Zsendovits and his friends turned a condemned building complex on Kazinczy Street into a ruin bar. It started as an experimental bar with affordable drinks and bohemian ambience. It led to other ruin bars being opened, which had their own ambience and focus.

Ruin bars provide a relaxed environment for enjoying drinks, food, and dancing. They also often embrace the natural decay of their buildings, incorporating quirky furnishings and decor. These venues are appreciated by patrons of all ages. In addition to nighttime activities, ruin bars also serve as community hubs and live music venues during the day. They have become a significant tourist attraction to Budapest.
