= Ii (IRC client) =

Minimal IRC client

ii
- Original authors: Anselm R. Garbe, Nico Golde
- Stable release: 2.0 / 4 October 2022
- Written in: C
- Operating system: Unix-like
- Available in: English
- Type: IRC client
- License: MIT License
- Website: tools.suckless.org/ii/

IRC It, or ii is a free and open-source Unix IRC client written in C by the suckless.org community.

From the readme:

ii is a minimalist FIFO and filesystem-based IRC client. It creates an irc directory tree with server, channel and nickname directories. In every directory a FIFO in file and a normal out file is created. The in file is used to communicate with the servers and the out files contain the server messages. For every channel and every nickname there are related in and out files created. This allows IRC communication from command line and adheres to the Unix philosophy.

ii is described as a client "even more plain" than the usual CLI-based clients, which are "commonly thought to be the most basic". It consists of less than 500 lines of sourcecode. Its core command set includes "joining and parting, changing nickname and setting topics."

Author Tobias Schlitt called ii "fantastic" and his "tool of the year", which "simply uses the file system to structure IRC connections, channels and queries and offers FIFOs to communicate with the server. It allows you to write IRC bots in bash (or any other language that allows file access)".

ii became the ideological father of multiple similar FUSE-based chat clients like XMPP client jacc, sj, or ircfs.

== See also ==
- Comparison of Internet Relay Chat clients
