= Ocho Macho =

Hungarian pop band formed in Kőszeg, Hungary in 2003

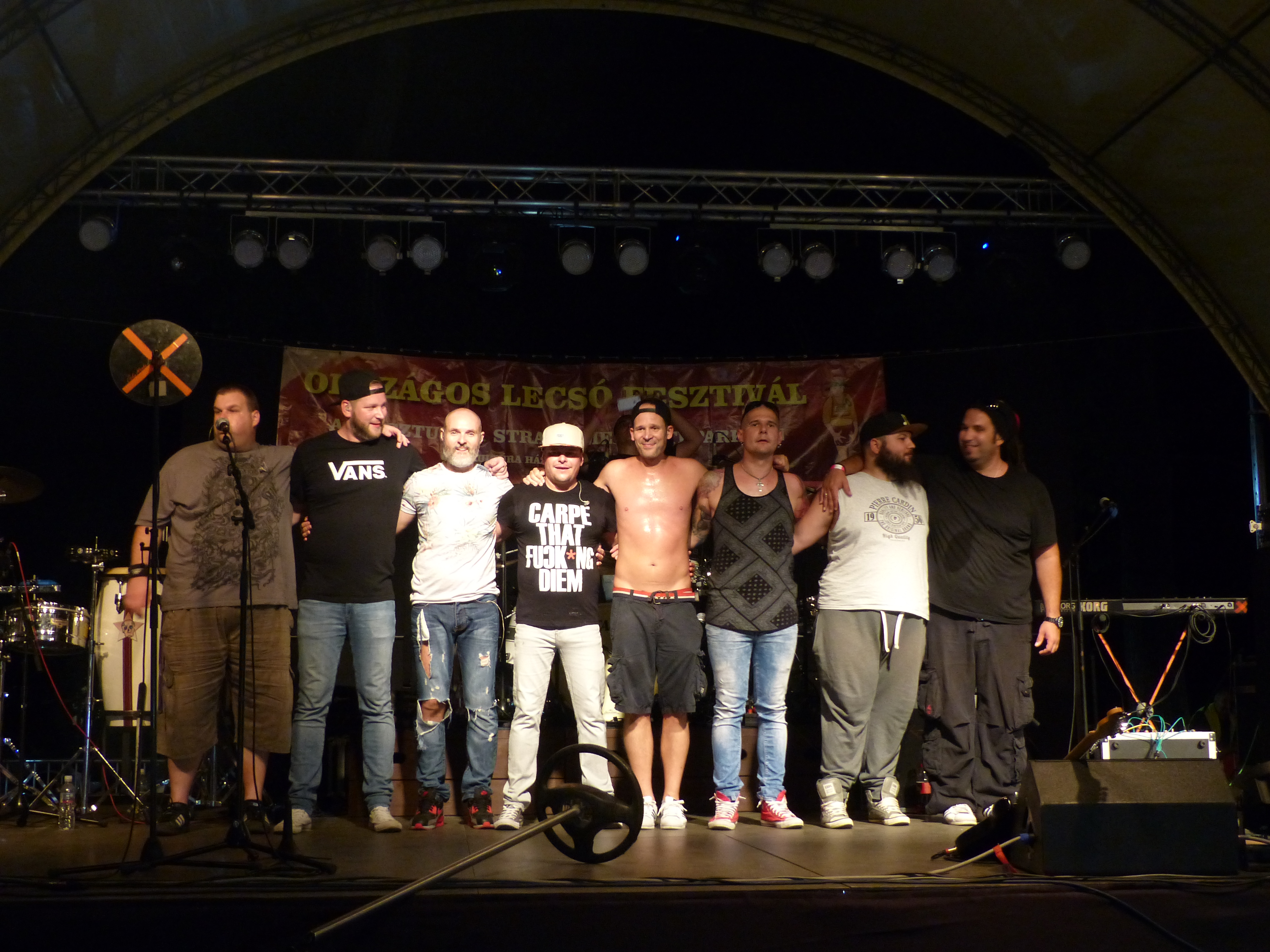
- Ocho Macho in 2016

Background information
- Origin: Szombathely, Hungary
- Genres: reggae, ska, punk, Latin
- Years active: 2003–present
- Label: CLS Music
- Members: Andor Csík; Gergő Kirchknopf; György Mersics; András Mórocz; Péter Müller; András Németh; Márton Szalai; Krisztián Tompa
- Past members: Csaba Biegner; Helga Döme; Gábor Drescher; Ákos Gyarmati; György Horváth; Ottó Kappel; György Kovacsics; Attila Milos; Gábor Pontyos
- Website: ochomacho.hu

Ocho Macho is a Hungarian pop band formed in Kőszeg, Hungary in 2003 playing a unique mixture of reggae, ska, Latin, and punk musical genres, which they call "huppogás".

The name was given by former bassist Attila Milos which is an incorrect Spanish expression for "eight males". In correct Spanish it would be "Ocho Machos".

== History ==
The band was founded in 2003 by percussionist Krisztián Tompa with intentions to form a party band in the Western region of Hungary. He sought for other musicians in and around Szombathely to play covers of popular songs. The band soon decided to write compositions of their own. The first bassist of the band, Attila Milos came up with the name, referring to the number and gender of the members, although it is incorrect in Spanish.

After several changes in the line-up they started to establish and grow a significant fanbase in the westernmost counties of Hungary and the adjacent regions of Austria.

In the fall of 2007, they released a maxi CD with three songs, which was the precursor to their debut album "El mundo fantástico", released in 2008 by the band. In 2009, CLS Music (previously CLS Records) reissued the album, this is considered their first official release.

After the album's release they started to perform frequently in Hungary and in Austria and by 2010 they became one of the most steady performers of festivals and different clubs. Austrian public radio, ORF and its Spanish affiliates put their songs in their playlist, which rarely happens to Hungarian bands.

In 2010, to honor the memory of world-famous legendary Hungarian footballer, Ferenc Puskás they released their second maxi single called "Pancho (Bum-Bum)". among others, they performed the title track which they performed in Madrid in the Santiago Bernabéu Stadium, home to Real Madrid football club, where Puskás played in the later years of his career, and still remembered by Real Madrid fans.

== Members ==
=== Current members ===
- Áron Daróczi – trumpet
- Gergő Kirchknopf – lead vocals
- Dominik Jánny – drums and percussion
- Ákos Frolov – trombone
- Benjamin Wolford – keyboards
- Zsolt Derzsi – guitars
- Adrián Roland Takács – bass guitar
- Ya Ou – guitar, vocals

=== Former members ===
- Csaba Biegner – drums
- Helga Döme – vocals
- Gábor Drescher – trumpet
- Ákos Gyarmati – trombone
- György Horváth -bass guitar
- Ottó Kappel – bass guitar
- György Kovacsics – drums
- Attila Milos – bass guitar
- Gábor Pontyos – guitars
- Andor Csik - trumpet
- György Mersics - drums
- Mike Gotthard - guitar

== Discography ==
=== Singles and Maxi singles ===
Year	Title	Label
2007	Ocho Macho	none
2010	Pancho (Bum Bum)	CLS Music

=== Albums ===
Year	Title	Label
2008	El mundo fantástico	none
2009	El mundo fantástico	CLS Music
2011	Online a Világ	CLS Music

== See also ==
- Hungarian pop
