= André Vásáry =

Hungarian singer and sopranist

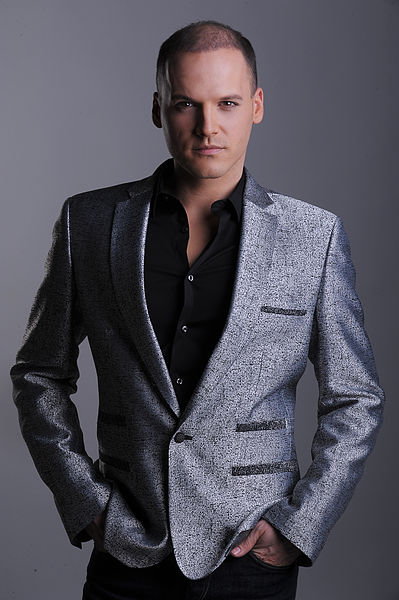
- André Vásáry in 2012

Background information
- Born: 17 July 1982 (age 43); Debrecen, Hungary
- Genres: Opera, Crossover, Pop
- Occupation: Singer,
- Instrument: vocals
- Years active: 2006–present
- Labels: EMI, Universal, Convention Budapest
- Website: www.andrevasary.com

André Vásáry (born 17 July 1982, Debrecen) is a Hungarian singer and sopranist. He is one of the leading countertenors in the contemporary classical scene, however his repertoire encompasses other genres as well. During his 10-year career, he has one gold and three platinum albums.

== Career ==
Vásáry started to train for his career in Boston. In his early days, he won the Miskolc Opera Festival. He participated in the Joint Adoro tour in Germany, featured in Paris, Vienna and many other European cities. With the advice of Riccardo Muti, he was invited to sing at the Vienna State Opera. He became domestically recognized by concerts performed at the Pesti Theatre between 2009-2012 and as a guest artist in Friedrich Schiller's Intrigue and Love by the National Theatre, where Kossuth Prize-winning artists on one stage formed a special song entirely for his singing voice role.

In addition to the classical style he portrays, concerts had songs in crossover style, and Vásáry had his own excursion into the world of pop music as well. He is also a frequent TV guest on many shows.

In November 2010, he appeared on the third CD of a special Christmas album, which reached gold in its first week in classical music, and has been certified platinum. It is the world's first recorded orchestral Christmas compilation that was made by a male sopranist.

André Vásáry been nominated for the 2011 Fonogram awards for the Hungarian contemporary classical music album category.

In September 2015, Vásáry was the leading soloist for the world-famous Hungarian Red Army Choir tour.

In December 2015, Vásáry was announced as one of the singers in the 2016 edition of A Dal, the Hungarian national final for the Eurovision Song Contest, competing with the song Why?. He competed in the final, but was not one of the superfinalist.
