= CLS Music =

- Founded: 2002 (as CLS Records)
- Genre: Various
- Country of origin: Hungary
- Location: Budapest
- Official website: cls.hu

CLS Music is a Budapest based independent record label, founded in 2002 as CLS Records. In 2010, the company changed its name to "CLS Music" to reflect a shift in the company's focus from releasing records to more wide-scope musical management. The company is also a major redistributor of foreign independent and electronic music releases in Hungary. At the end of 2013, the CLS Music label was run by Egység Média Kft, founded by one of the owners of CLS Records in 2008. From the second half of 2013, Egység Média releases music under the Egység Média / CLS Music label. In 2016, Egység Média was one of the 21 labels nominated for the IMPALA FIVEUNDERFIFTEEN campaign shining a light on Europe's most inspiring young labels. The label received the IMPALA Young Label Spotlight Award.

== Some artists in the CLS Music catalogue ==
- 30Y
- Andrewboy
- Anima Sound System
- Anna and the Barbies
- Background
- ByeAlex
- Compact Disco
- Éliás Jr.
- Hamvai PG
- Irie Rock Trió
- Irigy Hónaljmirigy
- Judie Jay
- Juli Fabian
- Karányi
- Kovbojok
- Kowalsky meg a Vega
- Magdolna Rúzsa
- Mocsok1Kölykök
- Ocho Macho
- Spigiboy
- Sziámi
- Tankcsapda
- We Plants Are Happy Plants
- Yonderboi
- Zagar
- Zoohacker
- Zsuzsa Varga

CLS Records logo until 2010

== See also ==
- List of record labels
