= Hungarian Music Awards =

Awards given to artists in the field of Hungarian music

The Hungarian Music Awards have been given to artists in the field of Hungarian music since 1992. The award categories are similar to Grammy Awards in the United States and Brit Awards in the United Kingdom.

The awards were known as the Golden Giraffe Awards until 2003. The award is presented by Mahasz, the Hungarian music industry association. The current official name is Fonogram – Hungarian Music Awards.

== Categories ==
The categories may have been added and/or removed in the past.

=== International categories ===
- Pop-Rock Album of the Year
- Modern Pop-Rock Album of the Year
- Alternative Music Album of the Year
- Hard Rock-Metal Album of the Year
- Dance-Pop Album of the Year

=== Domestic categories ===
- Pop-Rock Album of the Year
- Modern Pop-Rock Album of the Year
- Alternative Music Album of the Year
- Electronic Album of the Year
- Hard Rock-Metal Album of the Year
- Dance-Pop Album of the Year
- Jazz Album of the Year
- World Music Album of the Year
- Entertainment Music Album of the Year
- Children Album of the Year
- Newcomer of the Year
- Song of the Year
- Music DVD of the Year
