= X-Faktor series 5 =

X-Faktor
- Series 5
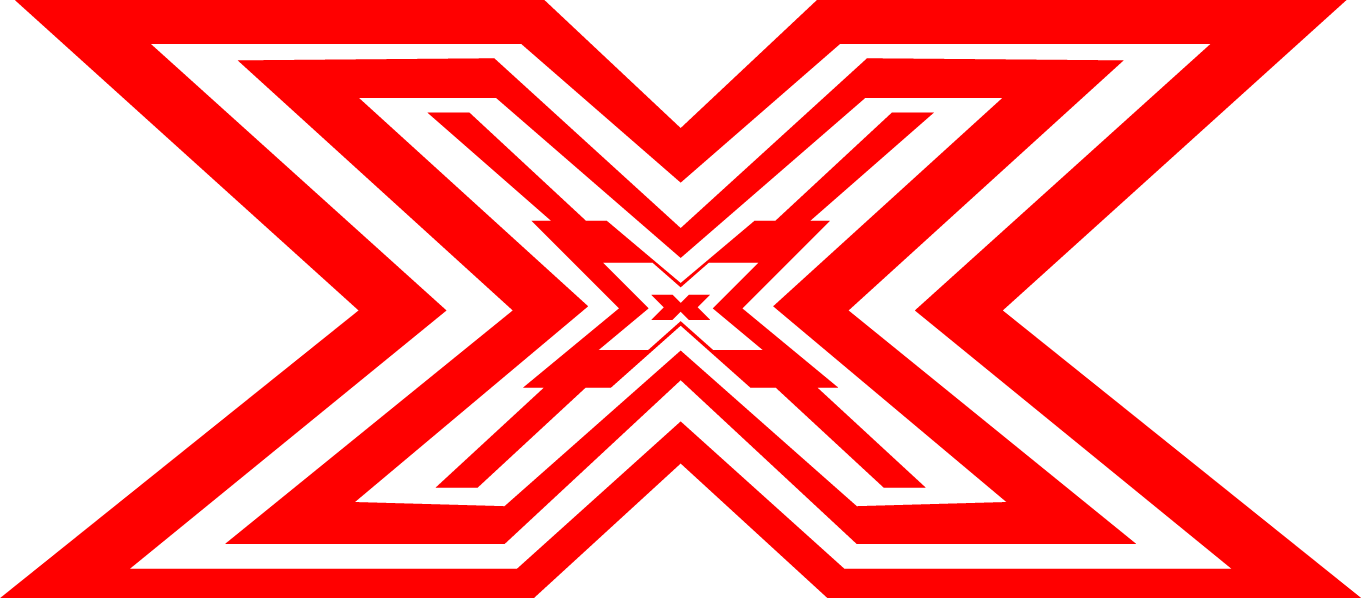
- Hosted by: Bence Istenes
- Judges: Róbert Szikora; Gabi Tóth; Róbert Alföldi; Gábor Szűcs
- Winner: Andrea Tóth
- Winning mentor: Robert Szikora
- Runner-up: Juli Horányi

Release
- Original network: RTL Klub
- Original release: 6 September – 21 December 2014

Series chronology
- ← Previous; Series 4 Next → Series 6

X-Faktor is a Hungarian television music competition to find new singing talent. The fifth series was broadcast on RTL Klub in 2014. Bence Istenes presented his second series of X-Faktor. Róbert Szikora, Gabi Tóth and Róbert Alföldi all returned to judge the talent for the second time. Gábor Szűcs, a new judge joined them, replacing the original judge Péter Geszti.

The series lowered the age limit from 16 to 14.

== Judges and presenters ==
Geszti, the only original judge left, announced his intention to leave the show after the fourth series to concentrate on his music career. The three other judges returned for a second series with the new judge Szűcs whose stage name is Little G. Weevil.

The original host, Nóra Ördög, was to return to the show for this series, but she became pregnant. RTL asked Bence Istenes back to host the show for a second run.

== Auditions ==
Open auditions took place in Budapest on 10 May 2014. The judges' auditions started on 31 May in Budapest.

== Bootcamp ==
The bootcamp was broadcast on 4 and 5 October.

The contestants sang live for an audience and the judges. At the end of the day, the judges revealed the 24 remaining acts for the judges' houses.

== Judges' houses ==
At this stage of the competition each judge mentored six acts. Each judge had help from a guest judge to choose their final acts.

The twelve eliminated acts were:

- Boys: Balázs Karancs, Benji (Le Quang Huy), László Sallai
- Girls: Anasztázia Bordás, Andrea Cseh, Gwendolin Krizsma
- Over 25s: Erika Albero, Ági Horváth, Krisztián Horváth
- Groups: Phoenix Rt, Rock-Inger, Rosewood

== Contestants ==
Key:

– Winner
– Runner-up
– Third place

Category (mentor)	Acts			
Boys (Alföldi)	Benji	Richárd Borbély	Richárd Nagy	Richárd Szabó
Girls (Szikora)	Jenifer Ilyés	Izabella Jakab-Péter	Andrea Tóth	
Over 25s (Szűcs)	Jonathan Andelic	Juli Horányi	Zsófi Kállai-Kiss	
Groups (Tóth)	Pálinka Republik	Spoon	Tha Shudras	

== Results summary ==
– mentored by Róbert Szikora (girls)	– Bottom two
– mentored by Róbert Alföldi (boys)	– Safe
– mentored by Gabi Tóth (groups)
– mentored by Gábor Szűcs (over 25s)

	Week 1	Week 2	Week 3	Week 4	Week 5	Week 6	Week 7	Week 8	Week 9	Final Week 10		
	Week 1	Week 2	Week 3	Week 4	Week 5	Week 6	Week 7	Week 8	Week 9	Round 1	Round 2	Round 3
Andrea Tóth	1st	1st	1st	1st	1st	1st	1st	1st	1st	1st	1st	Winner; 63.00%
Juli Horányi	4th	3rd	11th	5th	9th	4th	3rd	3rd	2nd	3rd	2nd	Runner-Up; 37.00%
Benji	7th	10th	6th	2nd	2nd	6th	4th	6th	4th	2nd	3rd	Eliminated (Week 10)
Richárd Nagy	2nd	2nd	5th	6th	4th	3rd	2nd	4th	3rd	4th	Eliminated (Week 10)	
Tha Shudras	11th	9th	8th	7th	6th	7th	6th	2nd	5th	Eliminated (Week 9)		
Spoon	10th	8th	9th	8th	7th	5th	5th	5th	Eliminated (Week 8)			
Richárd Borbély	8th	7th	4th	10th	5th	2nd	7th	Eliminated (Week 7)				
Izabella Jakab-Péter	12th	5th	2nd	3rd	3rd	8th	Eliminated (Week 6)					
Jonathan Andelic	9th	12th	7th	4th	8th	Eliminated (Week 5)						
Richárd Szabó	3rd	6th	3rd	9th	Eliminated (Week 4)							
Zsófi Kállai-Kiss	6th	4th	10th	Eliminated (Week 3)								
Jenifer Ilyés	5th	11th	Eliminated (Week 2)									
Pálinka Republik	13th	Eliminated (Week 1)										
Bottom Two	Pálinka Republik, Izabella Jakab-Péter	Jenifer Ilyés, Jonathan Andelic	Juli Horányi, Zsófi Kállai-Kiss	Richárd Borbély, Richárd Szabó	Juli Horányi, Jonathan Andelic	Izabella Jakab-Péter, Tha Shudras	Tha Shudras, Richárd Borbély	Benji-Huy Le Quang, Spoon	Benji-Huy Le Quang, Tha Shudras	No judges' vote or final showdown: public votes alone decide who is eliminated and who ultimately wins		
Szűcs's vote to eliminate	Pálinka Republik	Jenifer Ilyés	Zsófi Kállai-Kiss	Richárd Szabó	Jonathan Andelic	Tha Shudras	Tha Shudras	Spoon	Tha Shudras	No judges' vote or final showdown: public votes alone decide who is eliminated and who ultimately wins		
Szikora's vote to eliminate	Pálinka Republik	Jonathan Andelic	Zsófi Kállai-Kiss	Richárd Borbély	Jonathan Andelic	Tha Shudras	Richárd Borbély	Spoon	Benji	No judges' vote or final showdown: public votes alone decide who is eliminated and who ultimately wins		
Tóth's vote to eliminate	Izabella Jakab-Péter	Jenifer Ilyés	Zsófi Kállai-Kiss	Richárd Szabó	Juli Horányi	Izabella Jakab-Péter	Richárd Borbély	Benji	Benji	No judges' vote or final showdown: public votes alone decide who is eliminated and who ultimately wins		
Alföldi's vote to eliminate	Pálinka Republik	Jenifer Ilyés	Zsófi Kállai-Kiss	Richárd Szabó	Jonathan Andelic	Izabella Jakab-Péter	Tha Shudras	Spoon	Tha Shudras	No judges' vote or final showdown: public votes alone decide who is eliminated and who ultimately wins		
Eliminated	Pálinka Republik; 3 from 4 votes Majority	Jenifer Ilyés; 3 from 4 votes Majority	Zsófi Kállai-Kiss; 4 from 4 votes Majority	Richárd Szabó; 3 from 4 votes Majority	Jonathan Andelic; 3 from 4 votes Majority	Izabella Jakab-Péter; 2 from 4 votes Deadlock	Richárd Borbély; 2 from 4 votes Deadlock	Spoon; 3 from 4 votes Majority	Tha Shudras; 2 from 4 votes Deadlock	Richárd Nagy; Fewest votes to win	Benji; 3rd Place	Juli Horányi; 2nd Place
Eliminated	Pálinka Republik; 3 from 4 votes Majority	Jenifer Ilyés; 3 from 4 votes Majority	Zsófi Kállai-Kiss; 4 from 4 votes Majority	Richárd Szabó; 3 from 4 votes Majority	Jonathan Andelic; 3 from 4 votes Majority	Izabella Jakab-Péter; 2 from 4 votes Deadlock	Richárd Borbély; 2 from 4 votes Deadlock	Spoon; 3 from 4 votes Majority	Tha Shudras; 2 from 4 votes Deadlock	Richárd Nagy; Fewest votes to win	Benji; 3rd Place	Andrea Tóth; 1st Place

== Live shows ==
=== Week 1 (18 October) ===
- Theme: Songs that describe the contestants
- Celebrity performer: Dóra Danics ("Jelenidő")
- Group performance: "Lay Me Down"

A summary of the contestants' performances on the first live show and results show, along with the results.
Act	Order	Song	Result
Pálinka Republik	1	"Disko Partizani"/"Smooth"/"Represent Cuba"	Bottom two
Izabella Jakab-Péter	2	"Titanium"	Bottom two
Tha Shudras	3	"Music"	Safe
Zsófi Kállai-Kiss	4	"The Best"	Safe
Richárd Borbély	5	"Dream On"	Safe
Jonathan Andelic	6	"With a Little Help from My Friends"	Safe
Jenifer Ilyés	7	"Listen"	Safe
Spoon	8	"Freedom"	Safe
Juli Horányi	9	"Skinny Love"	Safe
Richárd Szabó	10	"Unchained Melody"	Safe
Benji	11	"Mad World"	Safe
Andrea Tóth	12	"Walk This Way"	Safe
Richárd Nagy	13	"Belehalok"	Safe
Final showdown details
Pálinka Republik	1	"Uprising"	Eliminated
Izabella Jakab-Péter	2	"Your Song"	Safe

Judge's vote to eliminate

- Tóth: Izabella Jakab-Péter
- Szikora: Pálinka Republik
- Alföldi: Pálinka Republik
- Szűcs: Pálinka Republik

=== Week 2 (25 October) ===
- Theme: Love songs
- Celebrity performer: Gergő Rácz ("Shotgun")
- Group performance: "One"

A summary of the contestants' performances on the second live show and results show, along with the results.
Act	Order	Song	Result
Richárd Szabó	1	"Crazy Little Thing Called Love"	Safe
Jenifer Ilyés	2	"Bleeding Love"	Bottom two
Spoon	3	"It Will Rain"	Safe
Jonathan Andelic	4	"Mercy"	Bottom two
Tha Shudras	5	"She's a Lady"	Safe
Juli Horányi	6	"Bridge over Troubled Water"	Safe
Richárd Borbély	7	"I'd Do Anything for Love (But I Won't Do That)"	Safe
Andrea Tóth	8	"Right Here Waiting"	Safe
Benji	9	"Every Breath You Take"	Safe
Izabella Jakab-Péter	10	"Ég veled"	Safe
Richárd Nagy	11	"Love Somebody"	Safe
Zsófi Kállai-Kiss	12	"Lelketlen ember"	Safe
Final showdown details
Jenifer Ilyés	1	"I Have Nothing"	Eliminated
Jonathan Andelic	2	"Recovery"	Safe

Judge's vote to eliminate

- Szűcs: Jenifer Ilyés
- Szikora: Jonathan Andelic
- Tóth: Jenifer Ilyés
- Alföldi: Jenifer Ilyés

=== Week 3 (1 November) ===
- Theme: Songs by deceased artists
- Celebrity performer: ByeAlex ("Az én rózsám")
- Group performance: "Imádok élni" with the judges

A summary of the contestants' performances on the third live show and results show, along with the results.
Act	Order	Song	Result
Richárd Nagy	1	"T.N.T."	Safe
Juli Horányi	2	"Kék és narancssárga"	Bottom two
Jonathan Andelic	3	"My Love Is Your Love"	Safe
Izabella Jakab-Péter	4	"Még nem veszíthetek"	Safe
Benji	5	"Smile"	Safe
Tha Shudras	6	"Hit the Road Jack"	Safe
Richárd Borbély	7	"Hosszú az a nap"	Safe
Zsófi Kállai-Kiss	8	"Earth Song"	Bottom two
Spoon	9	"Azért vannak a jó barátok"	Safe
Richárd Szabó	10	"What a Wonderful World"	Safe
Andrea Tóth	11	"The Show Must Go On"	Safe
Final showdown details
Zsófi Kállai-Kiss	1	"Who Wants to Live Forever"	Eliminated
Juli Horányi	2	"Játssz még!"	Safe

Judge's vote to eliminate

- Szűcs: Zsófi Kállai-Kiss
- Szikora: Zsófi Kállai-Kiss
- Tóth: Zsófi Kállai-Kiss
- Alföldi: Zsósi Kállai-Kiss

=== Week 4 (8 November) ===
- Theme: Current party songs
- Celebrity performer: Kelemen Kabátban ("Maradjatok gyerekek")
- Group performance: "Bang Bang"

A summary of the contestants' performances on the fourth live show and results show, along with the results.
Act	Order	Song	Result
Andrea Tóth	1	"Free Your Mind"	Safe
Richárd Szabó	2	"Cheating"	Bottom two
Spoon	3	"Thrift Shop"	Safe
Benji	4	"Faith"	Safe
Izabella Jakab-Péter	5	"Burn"	Safe
Tha Shudras	6	"I Want It That Way"/"Everybody (Backstreet's Back)"	Safe
Jonathan Andelic	7	"Szólj rám, ha hangosan énekelek"	Safe
Richárd Nagy	8	"Gangnam Style"	Safe
Juli Horányi	9	"The Edge of Glory"	Safe
Richárd Borbély	10	"Kiss"	Bottom two
Final showdown details
Richárd Szabó	1	"Freedom"	Eliminated
Richárd Borbély	2	"Billie Jean"	Safe

Judge's vote to eliminate

- Alföldi: Richárd Szabó
- Tóth: Richárd Szabó
- Szikora: Richárd Borbély
- Szűcs: Richárd Szabó

=== Week 5 (15 November) ===
- Theme: Songs sung by the contestants opposite sex
- Celebrity performer: Honeybeast ("Egyedül")
- Group performance: "Little Talks"

A summary of the contestants' performances on the fifth live show and results show, along with the results.
Act	Order	Song	Result
Juli Horányi	1	"Moves like Jagger"	Bottom two
Richárd Borbély	2	"Hello"	Safe
Izabella Jakab-Péter	3	"Billionaire"	Safe
Tha Shudras	4	"Boldogság, gyere haza"	Safe
Jonathan Andelic	5	"Next to Me"	Bottom two
Andrea Tóth	6	"Jailhouse Rock"	Safe
Richárd Nagy	7	"Félteni kell"	Safe
Spoon	8	"Wannabe"	Safe
Benji	9	"Ha én rózsa volnék..."	Safe
Final showdown details
Jonathan Andelic	1	"Change the World"	Eliminated
Juli Horányi	2	"All by Myself"	Safe

Judge's vote to eliminate

- Szűcs: Jonathan Andelic
- Szikora: Jonathan Andelic
- Tóth: Juli Horányi
- Alföldi: Jonathan Andelic

=== Week 6 (22 November) ===
- Theme: Success, money, glamour
- Celebrity performer: Gergő Oláh ("A tükör előtt")
- Group performance: "Hall of Fame"

A summary of the contestants' performances on the sixth live show and results show, along with the results.
Act	Order	Song	Result
Benji	1	"Happy"	Safe
Juli Horányi	2	"Hero"	Safe
Richárd Borbély	3	"Fame"	Safe
Spoon	4	"Eye of the Tiger"	Safe
Izabella Jakab-Péter	5	"Material Girl"	Bottom two
Richárd Nagy	6	"Shape of My Heart"	Safe
Tha Shudras	7	"Money, Money, Money"	Bottom two
Andrea Tóth	8	"Cabaret"	Safe
Final showdown details
Tha Shudras	1	"Szomorú vasárnap"	Safe
Izabella Jakab-Péter	2	"A szabadság vándorai"	Eliminated

Judge's vote to eliminate

- Tóth: Izabella Jakab-Péter
- Szikora: Tha Shudras
- Alföldi: Izabella Jakab-Péter
- Szűcs: Tha Shudras

=== Week 7 (29 November) ===
- Theme: Rock
- Celebrity performer: Illés-együttes" ("Miért hagytuk, hogy így legyen?"), Bea Palya ("Szabadon")
- Group performance: "Amikor én még kissrác voltam", "Hé’ 67’" with András Kern

A summary of the contestants' performances on the seventh live show and results show, along with the results.
Act	Order	Song	Result
Tha Shudras	1	"Come Together"	Bottom two
Richárd Nagy	2	"You Really Got Me"	Safe
Benji	3	"Don't Let Me Be Misunderstood"	Safe
Andrea Tóth	4	"Ő még csak most 14"	Safe
Richárd Borbély	5	"Paint it Black"	Bottom two
Spoon	6	"Ne gondold"/"Az utcán"	Safe
Juli Horányi	7	"Nem leszek a játékszered"	Safe
Final showdown details
Tha Shudras	1	"We Are the Champions"	Safe
Richárd Borbély	2	"Iris"	Eliminated

Judge's vote to eliminate

- Alföldi: Tha Shudras
- Tóth: Richárd Borbély
- Szikora: Richárd Borbély
- Szűcs: Tha Shudras

=== Week 8 (6 December) ===
- Theme: All that jazz
- Celebrity performer: Tibor Kocsis ("Hello Budapest")
- Group performance: "Santa Claus Is Coming to Town"

A summary of the contestants' performances on the eighth live show and results show, along with the results.
Act	Order	Song	Result
Spoon	1	"Get Lucky"	Bottom two
Juli Horányi	2	"It's a Man's Man's Man's World"	Safe
Richárd Nagy	3	"Welcome to the Jungle"	Safe
Tha Shudras	4	"Stayin' Alive"	Safe
Andrea Tóth	5	"Sweet Child o' Mine"	Safe
Benji	6	"Wonderwall"	Bottom two
Duet
Andrea Tóth & Tha Shudras	1	"Shout"	
Benji & Spoon	2	"Rise & Fall"	
Juli Horányi & Richárd Nagy	3	"Just Give Me a Reason"	
Final showdown details
Spoon	1	"Felnőtt gyermekek"	Eliminated
Benji	2	"The Climb"	Safe

Judge's vote to eliminate

- Alföldi: Spoon
- Tóth: Benji
- Szikora: Spoon
- Szűcs: Spoon

=== Week 9 (13 December) ===
- Theme: Film songs
- Celebrity performer: The Biebers ("Memories")
- Group performance: "Changing"

A summary of the contestants' performances on the ninth live show and results show, along with the results.
Act	Order	First song	Order	Second song	Result
Richárd Nagy	1	"Love Runs Out"	10	"Legyen úgy"	Safe
Juli Horányi	2	"Szerelem első vérig"	9	"Someone like You"	Safe
Tha Shudras	3	"S&M"	6	"Egy új élmény"	Bottom two
Benji	4	"A Thousand Years"	7	"My Baby"	Bottom two
Andrea Tóth	5	"Elég volt!"	8	"I Will Always Love You"	Safe
Final showdown details
Tha Shudras	1	"Enough" (original song)			Eliminated
Benji	2	"Open Arms"			Safe

Judge's vote to eliminate

- Alföldi: Tha Shudras
- Tóth: Benji
- Szikora: Benji
- Szűcs: Tha Shudras

=== Week 10 (20/21 December) ===
Saturday

- Theme: Mentors' favourite song of the series, duet with a surprise partner
- Celebrity performer: Szabó Balázs Bandája feat. Julie Rens ("Hétköznapi")
- Group performance: "Animals"

A summary of the contestants' performances on the tenth live show and results show, along with the results.
Act	Order	First song	Order	Second song	Order	Third song	Result
Richárd Nagy	1	"Love Somebody"	5	"Álmodtam egy világot"	9	"Holnapra kiderül" (with Viktor Varga)	Eliminated
Juli Horányi	2	"Bridge Over Troubled Water"	6	"Chandelier"	10	"Like a Child" (with Juli Fábián)	Safe
Andrea Tóth	3	"Cabaret"	8	"One Night Only"	12	"Játszom" (with Csipa)	Safe
Benji	4	"Ha én rózsa volnék..."	7	"Don't You Remember"	11	"We All" (with Bogi)	Safe

Sunday

- Theme: Act's choice, Christmas, contestants' favorite performance, winner's single
- Celebrity performer: Dóra Danics, Csaba Vastag
- Group performance: "Meglepetés" (all finalists)

A summary of the contestants' performances on the first part of the final live show and results show, along with the results.
Act	Order	First song	Order	Second song	Result
Andrea Tóth	1	"Legyen valami"	4	"Shake Up Christmas"	Safe
Benji	2	"Too Close"	5	"All I Want for Christmas is You"	Third place
Juli Horányi	3	"Soon We'll Be Found"	6	"Legyen ünnep"	Safe

A summary of the contestants' performances on the second part of the final live show and results show, along with the results.
Act	Order	Third song	Order	Fourth song	Result
Andrea Tóth	8	"The Show Must Go On"	10	"Legyek én"	Winner
Juli Horányi	7	"The Edge of Glory"	9	"Legyek én"	Runner-Up
