= X-Faktor series 2 =

X-Faktor
- Series 2
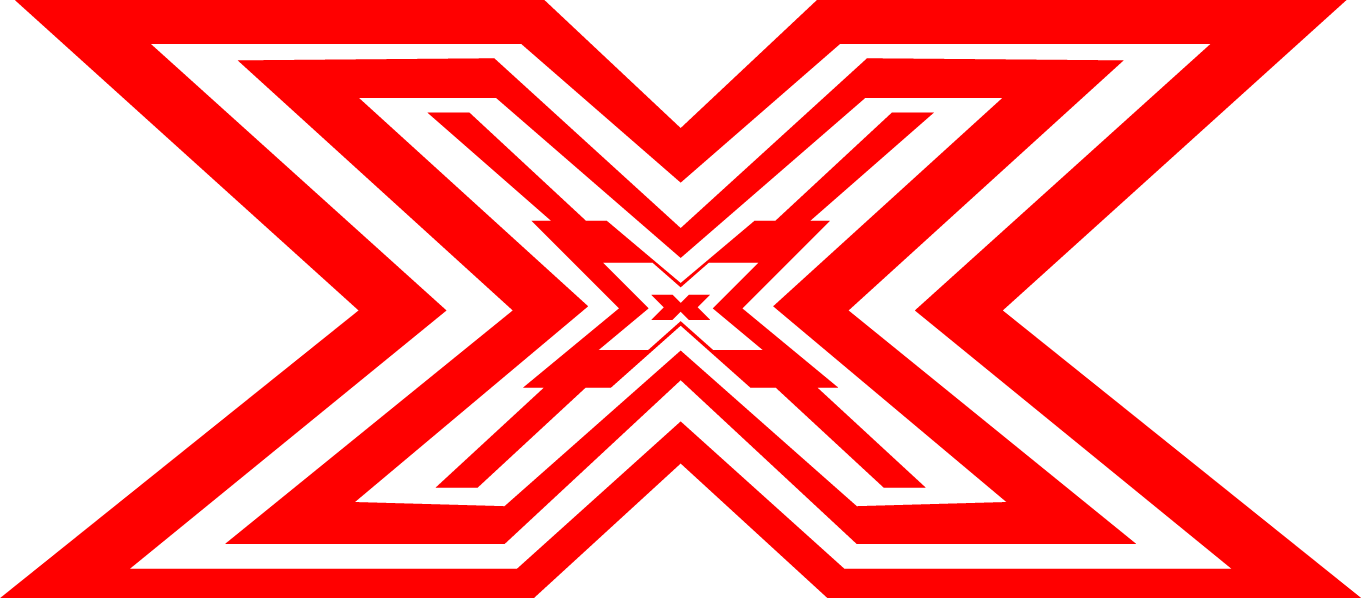
- Hosted by: Nóra Ördög
- Judges: Péter Geszti; Ildikó Keresztes; Miklós Malek; Feró Nagy
- Winner: Tibor Kocsis
- Winning mentor: Miklós Malek
- Runner-up: Enikő Muri

Release
- Original network: RTL Klub
- Original release: 3 September – 18 December 2011

Series chronology
- ← Previous; Series 1 Next → Series 3

The second season of the Hungarian television music talent show X-Faktor ended on 18 December 2011. Tibor Kocsis was announced as the winner. It was broadcast on the privately owned RTL Klub television station.

== Auditions ==
Auditions started in spring 2011, with thousands of candidates.

== Bootcamp ==
Bootcamp was in Thalia Theatre where 150 singers competed. In the first round the contestants sang a song of their choice. The judges immediately told the contestants if they were safe or not. In the second round only 50 contestants competed and they chose a song for themselves from a list. After this, based on the judges decision, 24 contestants went to the third round called "Judges' houses".

== Judges' houses ==
At this stage of the competition, each judge mentored six acts. Each judge had help from a guest judge to choose their final acts. Keresztes was helped by László Kicska, Malek by Gabriella Tóth, Nagy by Kati Wolf and Geszti by Béla Patkó. Contestants performed one song for their respective judge. Each judge and their guest eliminated three acts, leaving twelve remaining. The judges' houses stage was broadcast in two episodes on 8 and 9 October 2011.

The twelve eliminated acts were:

- Boys: Barna Gergely, Attila Oltyán, Arnold Tarsoly
- Girls: Blanka Abodi-Nagy, Éva Farkas, Petra Gubik
- Over 25s: András Géczi, Violetta Borzné Kovács, Beuka Luther
- Groups: Angler Balázs and Simon Boglárka, Szilvia Csótó and Kitti Berta, Tamás Czékmány and Hajnalka Wunderli

== Contestants ==
Key:

– Winner
– Runner-up
– Third Place

Category (mentor)	Acts		
Boys (Keresztes)	Gergő Baricz	Tamás Demes	Lil C. (Csaba Kelemen)
Girls (Nagy)	Alexa Bagosi	Vera Kováts	Enikő Muri
Over 25s (Malek)	Tibor Gyurcsík	Tibor Kocsis	Tamás Tarány
Groups (Geszti)	Apollo23	Ikrek	Rocktenors

== Results summary ==
– mentored by Feró Nagy (Girls)	– Bottom two
– mentored by Ildikó Keresztes (Boys)	– Most public votes that week
– mentored by Péter Geszti (Groups)
– mentored by Miklós Malek (Over 25s)

	Week 1	Week 2	Week 3	Week 4	Week 5	Week 6	Week 7	Week 8	Week 9	Final Week 10	
	Week 1	Week 2	Week 3	Week 4	Week 5	Week 6	Week 7	Week 8	Week 9	Round 1	Round 2
Tibor Kocsis	4th 11,70%	1st 28,10%	2nd 20,00%	1st 22,00%	1st 25,52%	6th 10,52%	1st 24,25%	1st 29,02%	1st 30,34%	1st 41,53%	Winner; 54,10%
Enikő Muri	1st 22,00%	2nd 18,80%	1st 23,10%	3rd 17,24%	2nd 14,62%	1st 22,40%	2nd 19,50%	2nd 20,50%	3rd 23,34%	2nd 33,08%	Runner-up; 45,90%
Gergő Baricz	2nd 14,80%	4th 8,00%	3rd 15,10%	2nd 19,87%	4th 13,53%	2nd 20,94%	3rd 18,15%	4th 16,15%	2nd 24,05%	3rd 25,29%	Eliminated (Week 10)
Tamás Tarány	3rd 12,90%	3rd 11,30%	4th 8,20%	4th 13,92%	3rd 13,89%	3rd 15,33%	5th 16,32%	3rd 19,44%	4th 22,19%	Eliminated (Week 9)	
Vera Kováts	5th 7,40%	5th 7,20%	6th 6,10%	6th 7,05%	5th 12,91%	4th 11,55%	4th 16,33%	5th 14,90%	Eliminated (Week 8)		
Rocktenors	11th 2,40%	8th 6,00%	9th 4,60%	8th 1,80%	6th 9,21%	5th 10,71%	6th 5,45%	Eliminated (Week 7)			
Lil C.	7th 6,30%	10th 3,40%	5th 7,30%	5th 10,36%	8th 4,28%	7th 8,55%	Eliminated (Week 6)				
Alexa Bagosi	8th 5,80%	7th 6,10%	8th 6,10%	7th 6,08%	7th 5,04%	Eliminated (Week 5)					
Apollo23	6th 6,30%	6th 6,40%	7th 6,10%	9th 1,69%	Eliminated (Week 4)						
Ikrek	9th 4,5%	9th 3,70%	10th 3,40%	Eliminated (Week 3)							
Tamás Demes	10th 3,90%	11th 1,00%	Eliminated (Week 2)								
Tibor Gyurcsík	12th 2,10%	Eliminated (Week 1)									
Bottom Two	Rocktenors, Tibor Gyurcsík	Tamás Demes, Lil C.	Ikrek, Rocktenors	Apollo23, Rocktenors	Alexa Bagosi, Lil C.	Lil C., Tibor Kocsis	Rocktenors, Tamás Tarány	Gergő Baricz, Vera Kováts	Enikő Muri, Tamás Tarány	No judges' vote or final showdown: public votes alone decide who is eliminated and who ultimately wins	
Geszti's vote to eliminate	Tibor Gyurcsík	Lil C.	Ikrek	Rocktenors	Alexa Bagosi	Tibor Kocsis	Tamás Tarány	Vera Kováts	Enikő Muri	No judges' vote or final showdown: public votes alone decide who is eliminated and who ultimately wins	
Keresztes's vote to eliminate	Rocktenors	Tamás Demes	Ikrek	Rocktenors	Alexa Bagosi	Tibor Kocsis	Rocktenors	Vera Kováts	Tamás Tarány	No judges' vote or final showdown: public votes alone decide who is eliminated and who ultimately wins	
Malek's vote to eliminate	Rocktenors	Tamás Demes	Ikrek	Apollo23	Alexa Bagosi	Lil C.	Rocktenors	Gergő Baricz	Enikő Muri	No judges' vote or final showdown: public votes alone decide who is eliminated and who ultimately wins	
Nagy's vote to eliminate	Tibor Gyurcsík	Tamás Demes	Rocktenors	Apollo23	Lil C.	Lil C.	Rocktenors	Gergő Baricz	Tamás Tarány	No judges' vote or final showdown: public votes alone decide who is eliminated and who ultimately wins	
Eliminated	Tibor Gyurcsík; 2 from 4 votes Deadlock	Tamás Demes; 3 from 4 votes Majority	Ikrek; 3 from 4 votes Majority	Apollo23; 2 from 4 votes Deadlock	Alexa Bagosi; 3 from 4 votes Majority	Lil C. 2 from 4 votes Deadlock	Rocktenors; 3 from 4 votes Majority	Vera Kováts; 2 from 4 votes Deadlock	Tamás Tarány; 2 from 4 votes Deadlock	Gergő Baricz; 3rd Place	Enikő Muri; 2nd Place
Eliminated	Tibor Gyurcsík; 2 from 4 votes Deadlock	Tamás Demes; 3 from 4 votes Majority	Ikrek; 3 from 4 votes Majority	Apollo23; 2 from 4 votes Deadlock	Alexa Bagosi; 3 from 4 votes Majority	Lil C. 2 from 4 votes Deadlock	Rocktenors; 3 from 4 votes Majority	Vera Kováts; 2 from 4 votes Deadlock	Tamás Tarány; 2 from 4 votes Deadlock	Gergő Baricz; 3rd Place	Tibor Kocsis; 1st Place

== Live Shows ==
=== Week 1 (15 October) ===
- Theme: Musical role models
- Celebrity performer: Csaba Vastag ("Szállj!")
- Group performance: "Egy másik nemzedék"

A summary of the contestants' performances on the first live show and results show, along with the results.
Act	Order	Song	Result
Lil C	1	"More"	Safe
Ikrek	2	"Beautiful"	Safe
Tibor Gyurcsík	3	"Rehab"	Bottom two
Tamás Tarány	4	"Vertigo"	Safe
Tamás Demes	5	"Let It Be"	Safe
Vera Kováts	6	"Breakaway"	Safe
Rocktenors	7	"Bad"/"Thriller"	Bottom two
Alexa Bagosi	8	"You'll See"	Safe
Tibor Kocsis	9	"Could It Be Magic"	Safe
Apollo23	10	"Patience"	Safe
Gergő Baricz	11	"A Little Less Conversation"	Safe
Enikő Muri	12	"If I Were A Boy"	Safe
Final showdown details
Rocktenors	1	"The Show Must Go On"	Safe
Tibor Gyurcsík	2	"Mindentől távol"	Eliminated

Judge's vote to eliminate

- Nagy: Tibor Gyurcsík
- Malek: Rocktenors
- Keresztes: Rocktenors
- Geszti: Tibor Gyurcsík

As both Acts got 2 Votes, they went to deadlock and Tibor Gyurcsík was eliminated.

=== Week 2 (22 October) ===
- Theme: Love songs
- Celebrity performer: Gabi Tóth ("Jöjj még")
- Group performance: "Tevagyazakitalegjobban"

A summary of the contestants' performances on the second live show and results show, along with the results.
Act	Order	Song	Result
Enikő Muri	1	"I Will Love Again"	Safe
Apollo23	2	"All Rise"	Safe
Tamás Tarány	3	"A csúnya fiúknak is van szíve"	Safe
Lil C	4	"Grenade"	Bottom two
Rocktenors	5	"Adagio"	Safe
Vera Kováts	6	"Love Song"	Safe
Gergő Baricz	7	"Love Is All Around"	Safe
Alexa Bagosi	8	"Jump"	Safe
Tamás Demes	9	"Hamu és gyémánt"	Bottom two
Ikrek	10	"Big Girls Don't Cry"	Safe
Tibor Kocsis	11	"Somebody to Love"	Safe
Final showdown details
Tamás Demes	1	"Fallin'"	Eliminated
Lil C	2	"Man in the Mirror"	Safe

Judge's vote to eliminate

- Geszti: Lil C
- Malek: Tamás Demes
- Keresztes: Tamás Demes
- Nagy: Tamás Demes

=== Week 3 (29 October) ===
- Theme: Rock
- Celebrity performer: Veca Janicsák ("Labirintus")
- Group performance: "Salalla"

A summary of the contestants' performances on the third live show and results show, along with the results.
Act	Order	Song	Result
Gergő Baricz	1	"Csak a szívemet teszem eléd"	Safe
Rocktenors	2	"(I Can't Get No) Satisfaction"	Bottom two
Alexa Bagosi	3	"My Immortal"	Safe
Tamás Tarány	4	"Best of You"	Safe
Ikrek	5	"Ő még csak most 14"	Bottom two
Tibor Kocsis	6	"Under the Bridge"	Safe
Vera Kováts	7	"Highway to Hell"	Safe
Apollo23	8	"Mielőtt elmegyek"	Safe
Enikő Muri	9	"U + Ur Hand"	Safe
Lil C	10	"Give In to Me"	Safe
Final showdown details
Ikrek	1	"Maradj velem"	Eliminated
Rocktenors	2	"Who Wants to Live Forever"	Safe

Judge's vote to eliminate

- Malek: Ikrek
- Geszti: Ikrek
- Nagy: Rocktenors
- Keresztes: Ikrek

=== Week 4 (5 November) ===
- Theme: Cover Songs
- Celebrity performer: Ary Bery ("A szavak eltalálnak ") and Vanilla Ágnes ("Ne higgy nekem")
- Group performance: "Szabadulj fel"

A summary of the contestants' performances on the fourth live show and results show, along with the results.
Act	Order	Song	Covered By	Result
Vera Kováts	1	"How Do You Do!"	Cascada	Safe
Tamás Tarány	2	"Music"	Roy & Ádám	Safe
Apollo23	3	"Umbrella"	The Baseballs	Bottom two
Tibor Kocsis	4	"I Want to Know What Love Is"	Mariah Carey	Safe
Rocktenors	5	"Take On Me"	Northern Kings	Bottom two
Enikő Muri	6	"Érzés"	Auth Csilla	Safe
Lil C	7	"It's My Life"	Paul Anka	Safe
Gergő Baricz	8	"Állj meg, kislány"	Csonka András & Zorall	Safe
Alexa Bagosi	9	"Mizu"	Kesh	Safe
Final showdown details
Rocktenors	1	"Always"		Safe
Apollo23	2	"Most kell eldöntenem"		Eliminated

Judge's vote to eliminate

- Malek: Apollo23
- Geszti: Rocktenors
- Nagy: Apollo23
- Keresztes: Rocktenors

As both Acts got 2 Votes, they went to deadlock and Apollo23 were eliminated.

=== Week 5 (12 November) ===
- Theme: Award-winning songs
- Celebrity performer: Kati Wolf ("Vár a holnap)")
- Group performance: "Sorskerék"

A summary of the contestants' performances on the fifth live show and results show, along with the results.
Act	Order	Song	Result
Rocktenors	1	"Don't Cry"	Safe
Alexa Bagosi	2	"I Don't Need a Man"	Bottom two
Gergő Baricz	3	"Use Somebody"	Safe
Vera Kováts	4	"Elég volt!"	Safe
Tamás Tarány	5	"Minden most kezdődik el"	Safe
Lil C	6	"Hol van az a lány"	Bottom two
Enikő Muri	7	"Feel"	Safe
Tibor Kocsis	8	"Kinek mondjam el vétkeimet?"	Safe
Final showdown details
Alexa Bagosi	1	"Heaven"	Eliminated
Lil C	2	"I Believe I Can Fly"	Safe

Judge's vote to eliminate

- Keresztes: Alexa Bagosi
- Malek: Alexa Bagosi
- Nagy: Lil C
- Geszti: Alexa Bagosi

=== Week 6 (19 November) ===
- Theme: Current party songs
- Celebrity performer: The Carbonfools ("Hideaway") and Fluor ("Mizu" / "Lájk" / "Halenda")
- Group performance: "A zenétől felforr a vérem"

A summary of the contestants' performances on the sixth live show and results show, along with the results.
Act	Order	Song	Result
Tibor Kocsis	1	"If I Had You"	Bottom two
Rocktenors	2	"Into the Night"	Safe
Lil C	3	"Beautiful Monster"	Bottom two
Vera Kováts	4	"Vuk"/"Party in the U.S.A."	Safe
Tamás Tarány	5	"Maniac"	Safe
Enikő Muri	6	"The Edge of Glory"	Safe
Gergő Baricz	7	"Are You Gonna Be My Girl"	Safe
Final showdown details
Lil C	1	"Hero"	Eliminated
Tibor Kocsis	2	"Against All Odds (Take a Look at Me Now)"	Safe

Judge's vote to eliminate

- Geszti: Tibor Kocsis
- Keresztes: Tibor Kocsis
- Malek: Lil C
- Nagy: Lil C

As both Acts got 2 Votes, they went to deadlock and Lil C was eliminated.

=== Week 7 (26 November) ===
- Theme: Weather-themed songs
- Celebrity performer: Norbi L. Király ("Valahol elveszett")
- Group performance: "Az én órám másképp jár"

A summary of the contestants' performances on the seventh live show and results show, along with the results.
Act	Order	Song	Result
Tamás Tarány	1	"Summer in the City"	Bottom two
Enikő Muri	2	"Március végétől"	Safe
Gergő Baricz	3	"Wonderful Life"	Safe
Tibor Kocsis	4	"Ain't No Sunshine"	Safe
Vera Kováts	5	"Set Fire to the Rain"	Safe
Rocktenors	6	"Homok a Szélben"	Bottom two
Duet
Enikő Muri & Tibor Kocsis	1	"As"	
Tamás Tarány & Rocktenors	2	"In the Shadows"	
Vera Kováts & Gergő Baricz	3	"Time After Time"	
Final showdown details
Rocktenors	1	"I Don't Want to Miss a Thing"	Eliminated
Tamás Tarány	2	"Second Chance"	Safe

Judge's vote to eliminate

- Keresztes: Rocktenors
- Nagy: Rocktenors
- Malek: Rocktenors
- Geszti: Tamás Tarány

=== Week 8 (3 December) ===
- Theme: One English song & One Hungarian song
- Celebrity performer: Aurea and Nikolas Takács ("Where Is The Love")
- Group performance: "Careless Whisper" and "Sosem vagy egyedül"

A summary of the contestants' performances on the eighth live show and results show, along with the results.
Act	Order	First song	Order	Second song	Result
Vera Kováts	1	"Hip-hop"	7	"Mine"	Bottom two
Tamás Tarány	2	"Closer to the Edge"	8	"Gyémánt"	Safe
Enikő Muri	3	"Sweet Dreams"	10	"Magányos csónak"	Safe
Gergő Baricz	4	"Hajolj bele a hajamba"	9	"True Blood"	Bottom two
Tibor Kocsis	5	"Feeling Good"	6	"Nem adom fel"	Safe
Final showdown details
Vera Kováts	1	"When I Look at You"			Eliminated
Gergő Baricz	2	"Dream On"			Safe

Judge's vote to eliminate

- Keresztes: Vera Kováts
- Nagy: Gergő Baricz
- Geszti: Vera Kováts
- Malek: Gergő Baricz

As both Acts got 2 Votes, they went to deadlock and Vera Kováts was eliminated.

=== Week 9 (10 December) ===
- Theme: One English song & One Hungarian song
- Celebrity performer: Anti Fitness Club, Anna Pásztor and Jonny K. Palmer ("Moves like Jagger"/"Satisfaction") and Ádám Szabó ("Magyarország")
- Group performance: "Vidéki sanzon"

A summary of the contestants' performances on the ninth live show and results show, along with the results.
Act	Order	First song	Order	Second song	Result
Tamás Tarány	1	"Lehetek én is"	7	"Cryin'"	Bottom two
Gergő Baricz	2	"Hard to Handle"	5	"Apám hitte"	Safe
Enikő Muri	3	"Kockahas"	6	"Because of You"	Bottom two
Tibor Kocsis	4	"Just the Way You Are"	8	"Legyen ünnep"	Safe
Final showdown details
Tamás Tarány	1	"Elfelejtett dal"			Eliminated
Enikő Muri	2	"The Voice Within"			Safe

Judge's vote to eliminate

- Geszti: Enikő Muri
- Nagy: Tamás Tarány
- Malek: Enikő Muri
- Keresztes: Tamás Tarány

As both Acts got 2 Votes, they went to deadlock and Tamás Tarány was eliminated.

=== Week 10 (17 December) ===
==== Saturday Night ====
- Theme: One chosen as the judges' favourite, one with a surprise duet partner, one song performed on the audition,
- Duets:
  - Gergő Baricz and KFT
  - Enikő Muri and Attila Dolhai
  - Tibor Kocsis and Zséda

A summary of the contestants' performances on the tenth live show and results show, along with the results.
Act	Order	First song	Order	Second song	Order	Third song	Result
Gergő Baricz	1	"Are You Gonna Be My Girl"	4	"Afrika"	7	"Wicked Game"	3rd
Enikő Muri	2	"Játssz még!"	5	"A zene az kell"	8	"Hurt"	Safe
Tibor Kocsis	3	"Somebody to Love"	6	"Mindhalálig mellettem"	9	"I Will Talk and Hollywood Will Listen"	Safe

==== Sunday Night ====
- Theme: Finalist's favourite previously performed song, Christmas, Winner Song

A summary of the contestants' performances on the finals and results show, along with the results.
Act	Order	First song	Order	Second song	Order	Third song	Result
Enikő Muri	1	"If I Were a Boy"	3	"Where Are You, Christmas"	5	"Mit ér egy hang?"	Runner-Up
Tibor Kocsis	2	"Feeling Good"	4	"Silent Night"	6	"Mit ér egy hang?"	Winner
