= Spoon 21 =

Hungarian band

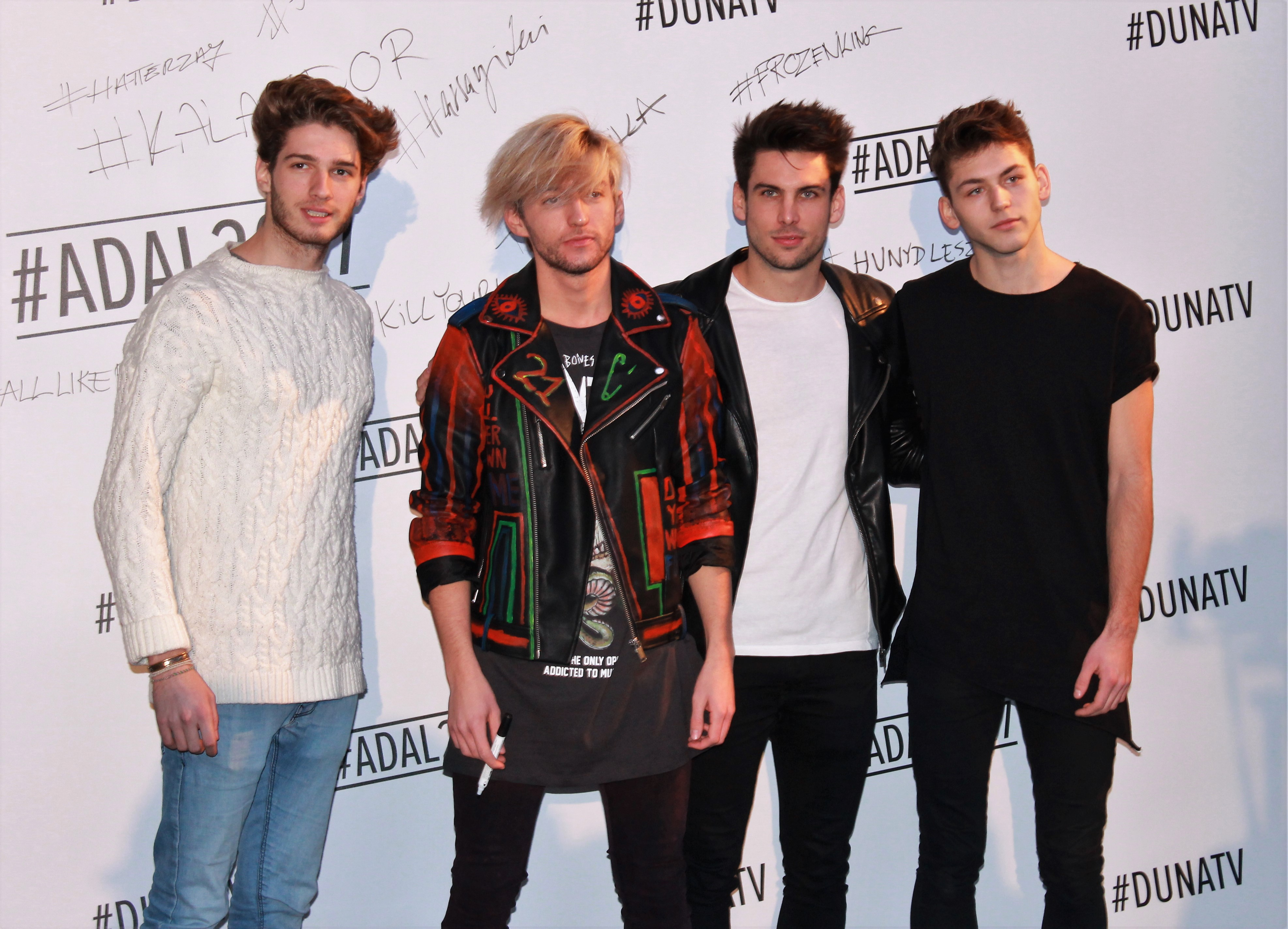
- Spoon 21 in 2016.

Background information
- Origin: Hungary
- Genres: Pop
- Years active: 2014–2017
- Members: Péter Földesi; Márton Grósz; Miklós Adrián Nagy; Kristóf Teremy

Spoon 21 (formerly known as Spoon) is a Hungarian band formed in 2013.

The four-member band was initially composed of three classmates at Arany János Sashegyi Gymnasium in Budapest, where they played regularly at school events. Their first major milestone was their appearance in the fifth season of the Hungarian TV music competition X-Faktor, where they were mentored by Gabi Tóth and reached sixth place. They participated in A Dal 2015, the 2015 edition of the national selection for Hungary for the Eurovision Song Contest 2015 with the song Keep Marching On. They were discovered by Gábor Heinz during the summer of 2014, playing on the streets of Balatonfüred, playing Heinz's own song for A Dal, Learning to Let Go. They reached the top four in the superfinal, but Boggie was selected to be the representative for Hungary that year.

In 2016, in addition to working on their first album, they undertook a month-long tour performing street music on the streets of European cities. They played in Berlin, Amsterdam, London, Paris, and Majorca. In September, they performed a concert at theatre shows in London.

It was announced on 8 December 2016 that Spoon, now known as Spoon 21, would return to A Dal for the 2017 edition with the song Deák, the title being a reference to Deák Ferenc tér. They reached the semi-finals and were eliminated.

== Members ==
- Péter Földesi
- Márton Grósz
- Miklós Adrián Nagy
- Kristóf Teremy

== Discography ==
- Keep Marching On (2015)
- A város (2015)
- Deák (2016)
- Húzzunk el (Éljen a nyár!) (2017)
