= Gina Kanizsa =

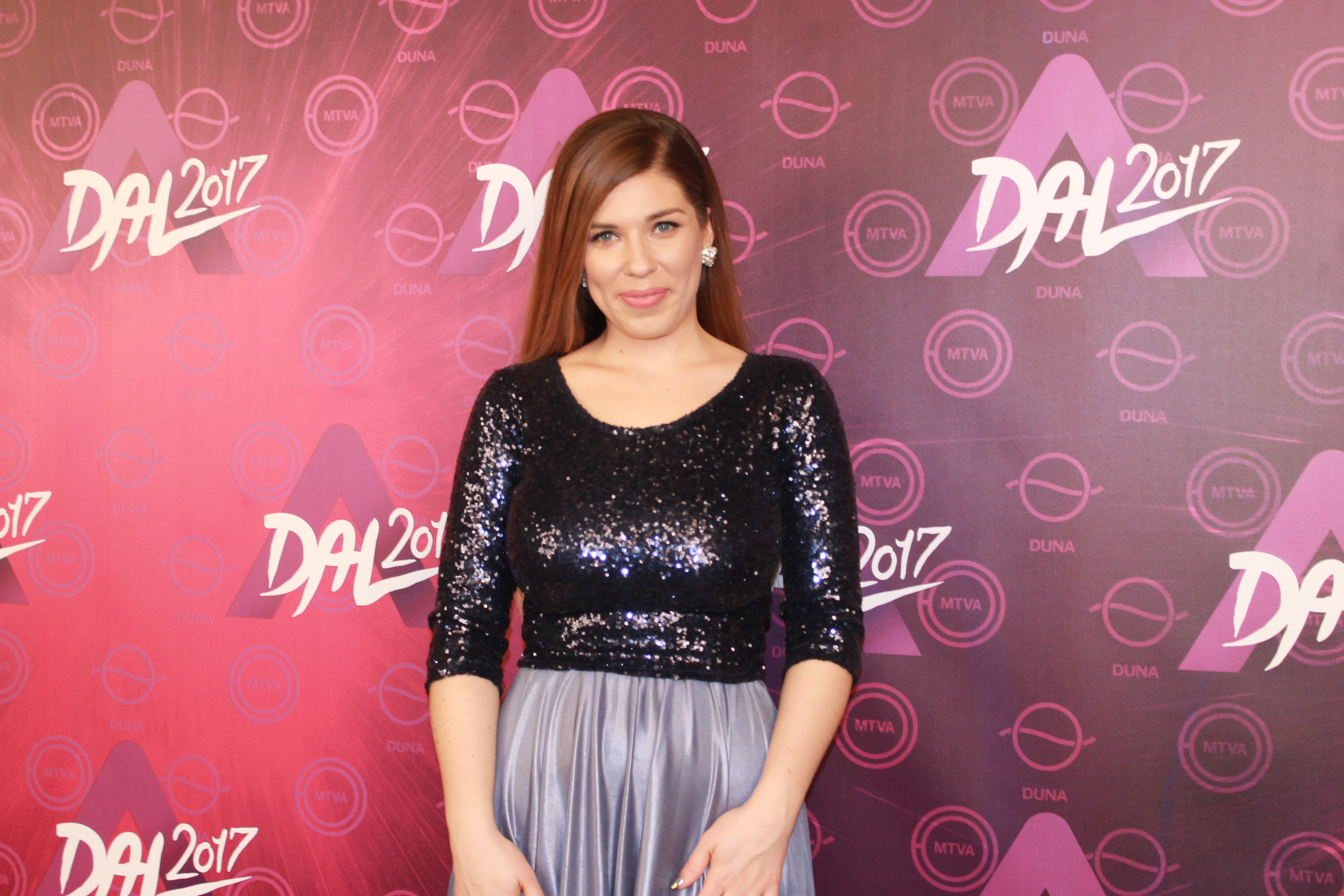
- Gina Kanizsa on 10 February 2017

Background information
- Born: Georgina Kanizsa; 28 April 1988 (age 37); Szolnok, Hungary
- Genres: Jazz
- Occupation: Singer
- Instrument: vocals
- Years active: 2008–present

Georgina Kanizsa, also known as Gina Kanizsa (born 28 April 1988, Szolnok) is a Hungarian jazz singer and performer, most notable for participating in A Dal 2017.

== Career ==
Between 2008 and 2013, she was the lead singer and songwriter of the band E.T.a.P, which in 2011 won first place in the electronic category in the first Talentométer competition, winning the audience award and the jury's special prize. Between 2010 and 2015, she was a vocalist and songwriter in the band Calm Spirit, and until 2012 she was also the singer and band leader of Gina Kanizsa & Third Plan. In 2013, she became the singer, songwriter and composer for the alternative jazz quartet Silence Fiction, with which she recorded her debut album in 2015.

In 2012, she joined the a cappella group Jazzation. The group took part in the 2013 Vokal Total A Cappella Competition in Graz, Austria, winning the grand prize in the jazz category, the Ward Swingle Award. In 2014, at the international Winter Vocal Festival in Pinerolo, Italy, she won both the grand prize in the a cappella category and the Voice of the Festival prize. In 2015, Jazzation won the Leipzig a cappella Award and the Audience Award at the International a cappella Contest in Leipzig, Germany. In 2015 she graduated from the Jazz faculty of the Franz Liszt Academy of Music, where she is currently a masters student.

In 2015, the song Beautiful Love from Jazzation's album Twisted was nominated for the Independent Music Awards Vox Populi audience award. In 2016, she won the Lakatos Ablakos Dezső jazz performer scholarship, performed at the CAFé Budapest Contemporary Arts Festival, and entered the Jazzy Song Content with the song How We Love, which she performed jointly with AnnaElza. She works with several well-known jazz bands such as Equinox, for whom she wrote the lyrics on their 2017 album. Since 2015, she has been teaching jazz singing at Etűd Music High School.

On 8 December 2016, Kanizsa was one of thirty acts chosen to participate in A Dal 2017, the national selection for Hungary in the Eurovision Song Contest, with the song Fall Like Rain. She reached the final of the competition.

== Awards ==
- International Winter Vocal Festival, Pinerolo (IT) - Voice Of The Festival (2014)
- A Dal 2017 Breakthrough Award (2017)
- Best Female Jazz Singer, jazz.hu (2023)
- Best Female Jazz Singer, jazz.hu (2024)

== Discography ==
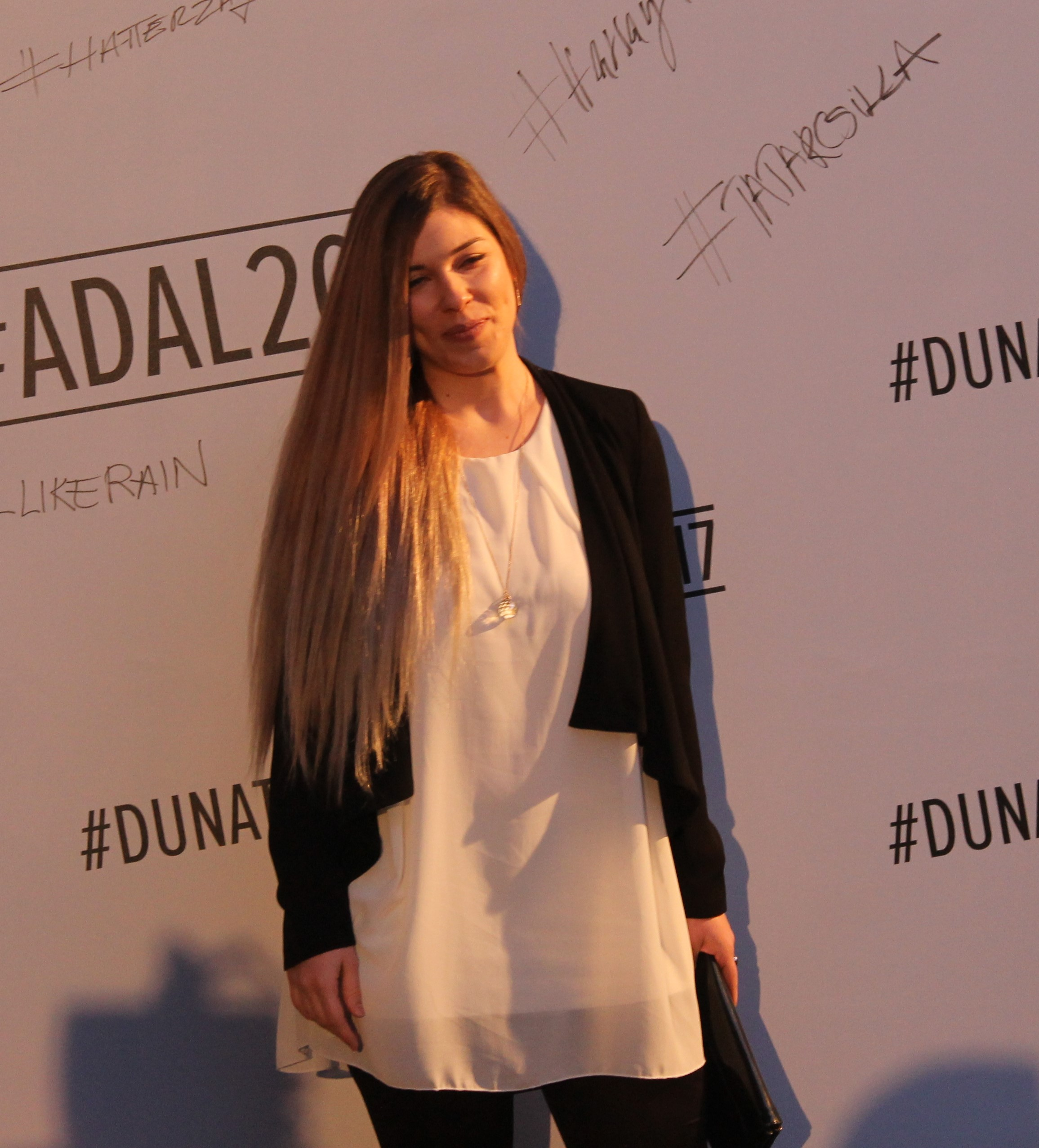
Gina Kanizsa at the first press conference for A Dal 2017, 8 December 2016

=== Studio albums ===
- Jazzation: Twisted (2014)
- Jazzation: LIVE (2018)
- Jazzation: Aeternum (2023)
- Budapest Orchestra Project feat. Jazzation: Macskafogó (2024)

=== Singles ===
- How We Love (2016) (with AnnaElza)
- Fall Like Rain (2017)
- Jazzation: Moonshiners (2020)
- Jazzation: 'Round Midnight (2022)
- Jazzation: Lotsva (2022)
- Jazzation: Come Sunday (2022)
- Jazzation: Blue Monk (2022)
