= Hungary in the Eurovision Song Contest 2017 =

- Eurovision Song Contest 2017
- Country: Hungary
- Selection process: A Dal 2017
- Selection date: 18 February 2017

Competing entry
- Song: "Origo"
- Artist: Joci Pápai
- Songwriters: József Pápai

Placement
- Semi-final result: Qualified (2nd, 231 points)
- Final result: 8th, 200 points

Participation chronology

Hungary was represented at the Eurovision Song Contest 2017. The local Media Services and Support Trust Fund (MTVA) and the Hungarian broadcaster Duna Media Service organised the national final A Dal 2017 in order to select the Hungarian entry for the 2017 contest in Kyiv, Ukraine.

== Background ==
Prior to the 2017 contest, Hungary had participated in the Eurovision Song Contest fourteen times since its first entry in 1994. Hungary's best placing in the contest was fourth, which they achieved with their début entry in 1994 with the song "Kinek mondjam el vétkeimet?" performed by Friderika Bayer. Hungary had attempted participate in the contest in 1993, however, their entry was eliminated in the preselection show Kvalifikacija za Millstreet. Hungary withdrew from the contest for six years between 1999 and 2004 and also missed the 2006 and 2010 contests. In 2014, Hungary achieved their second-best result in the contest since their début, placing fifth with the song "Running" performed by András Kállay-Saunders. In 2016, Hungary placed 19th in the Eurovision final with the song "Pioneer" performed by Freddie.

The Hungarian national broadcaster, Media Services and Support Trust Fund (MTVA), broadcasts the event within Hungary and organises the selection process for the nation's entry. MTVA confirmed their intentions to participate at the 2017 Eurovision Song Contest on 7 May 2016. Since 2012, MTVA has organised A Dal, a national selection show which has managed to, thus far, produce entries that have qualified the nation to the final of the Eurovision Song Contest each year and has resulted in two top 10 placings in 2013 and 2014. The Hungarian broadcaster continued selecting their entry through this process for 2017 with details regarding the organization of the A Dal 2017 national final being released along with their participation confirmation.

== Before Eurovision ==
=== A Dal 2017 ===
A Dal 2017 was the sixth edition of the Hungarian national selection A Dal, which selected Hungary's entry for the Eurovision Song Contest 2017. The competition consisted of 30 entries competing in three heats, two semi-finals, and a final. The hosts are Levente Harsányi, Krisztina Rátonyi, and Csilla Tatár.

==== Format ====
===== Judges =====
The A Dal 2017 judges

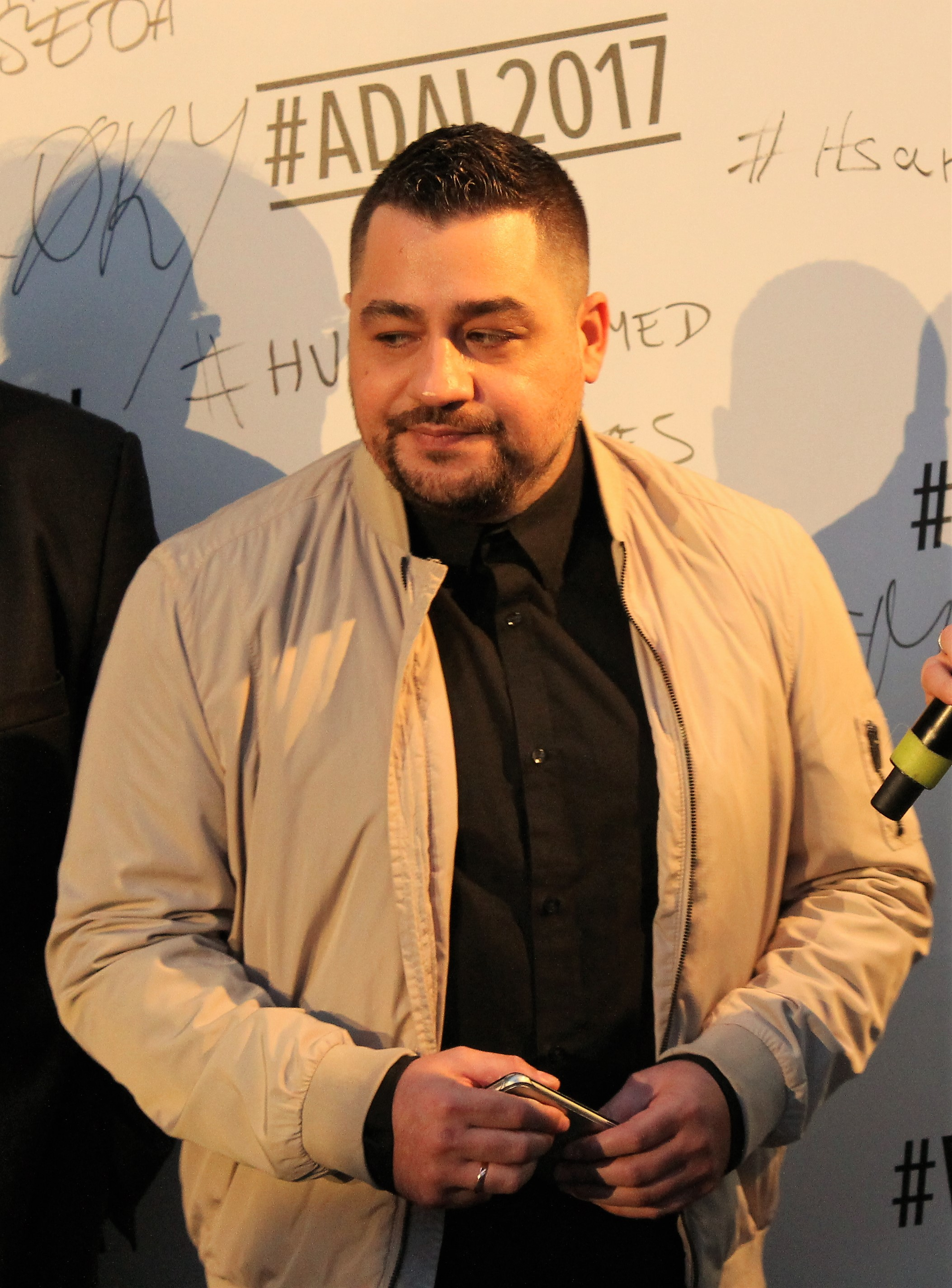
Caramel

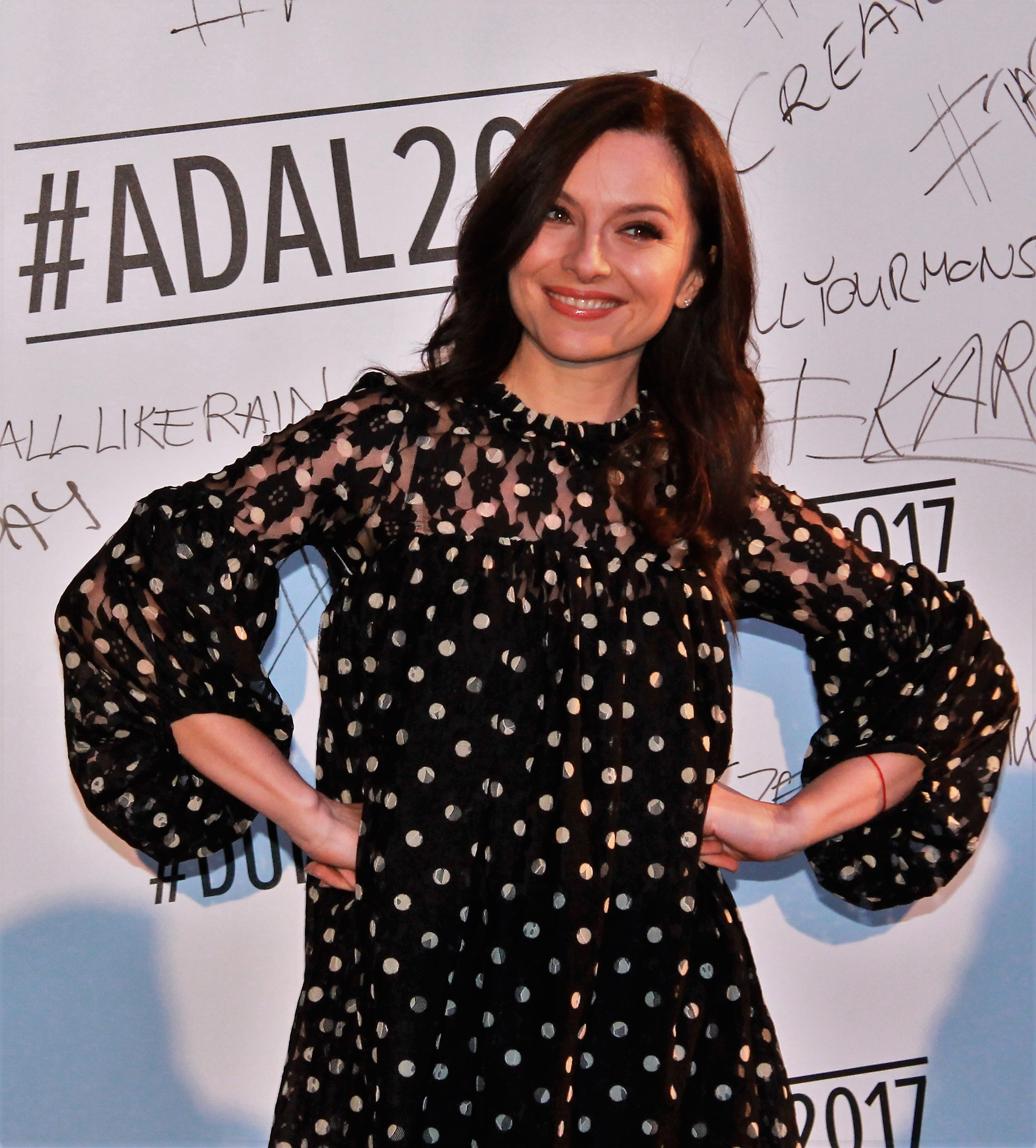
Zséda

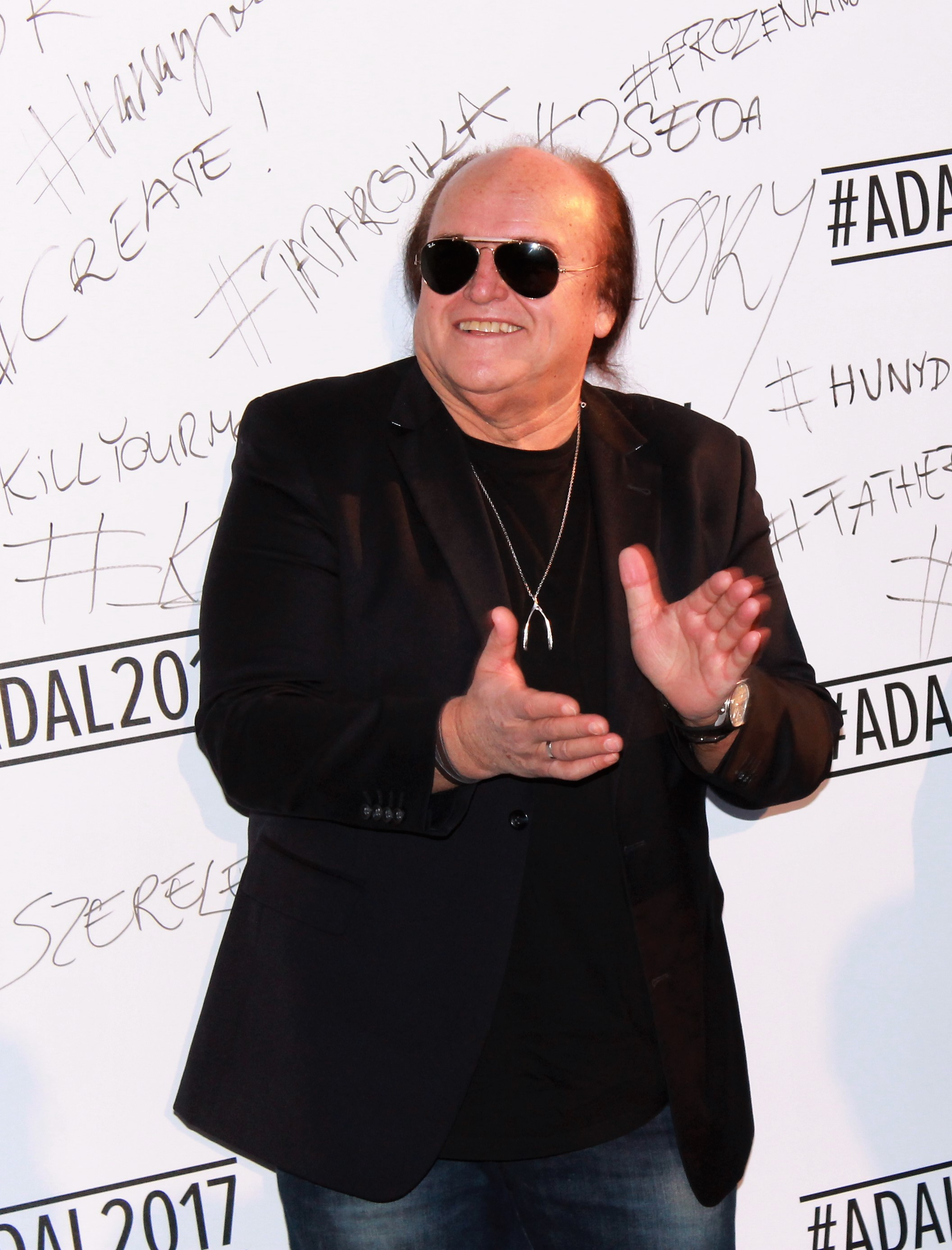
Károly Frenreisz

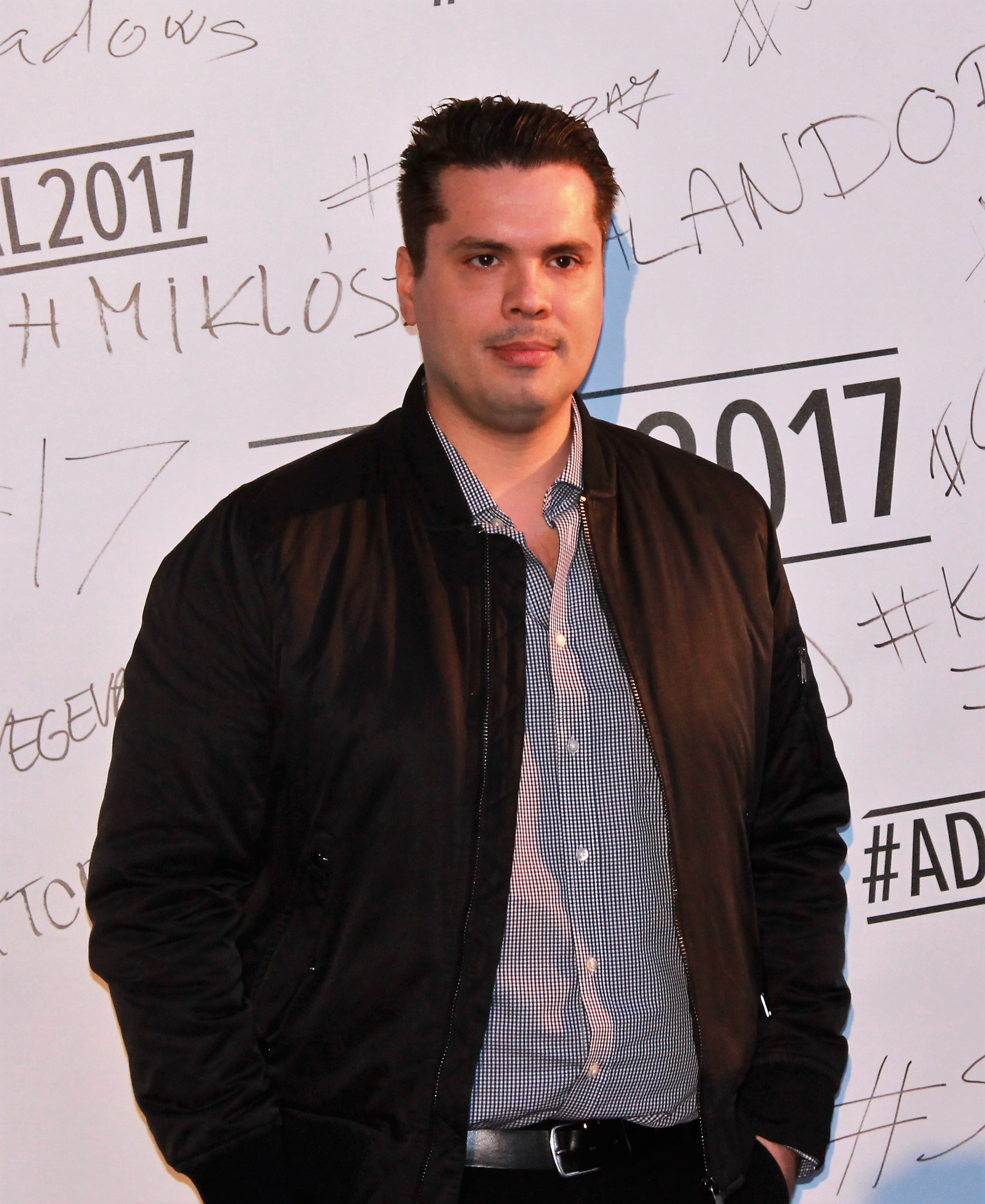
Miklós Both

==== Competing entries ====
On 11 October 2016, MTVA opened the submission period for artists and composers to submit their entries up until 20 November 2016. Two new rules for aspiring participants were created; all artists must belong to a record label or have a contract with a professional music manager, while also performers must have released an album previously or have performed their music on Hungarian television or radio. In January 2017, it was announced that Jetlag and the song "Keresem a bajt" would be replaced by Chase and the song "Dust in the Wind". Later, it was announced that Szabyest was disqualified due to his song being available to the public before 1 September 2016, which is against Eurovision rules. He was replaced by Rocktenors and their song "Ősz".

Disqualified/Withdrawn song
Replaced song

Artist	Song	Songwriter(s)
AnnaElza feat. Júli Kása	"Jártam"	Anna Elza Garay
Benji	"Karcok"	Zsolt Szepesi, Huy Quang Le, Máté Gyárfás, Gábor Budai
Calidora	"Glory"	Dóra Oberritter, Zsolt Szepesi, Attila Baross
Chase	"Dust in the Wind"	Johnny K. Palmer, Dániel Somogyvári, Dávid Henderson
The Couple	"Vége van"	Gábor Berkó
Kata Csondor	"Create"	Kata Csondor, Roland Balogh, Péter Mihola
Kyra Fedor	"Got to Be a Day"	Kyra Fedor, Csaba Nemes, Balázs Janky
Dávid Henderson	"White Shadows"	Dávid Henderson, Dávid Tóth, Péter Ferencz Peet
Jetlag	"Keresem a bajt"	Tamás Molnár
Kállay Saunders Band	"17"	András Kállay-Saunders, Zsolt Szepesi, Ádám Tóth
Gina Kanizsa	"Fall Like Rain"	Petra Várallyay, Katus Várallyay
Peter Kovary and the Royal Rebels	"It's a Riot"	Péter Zsolt Kővári
Leander Kills	"Élet"	Leander Köteles
Mrs. Columbo	"Frozen King"	Dorina Galambos, Dániel Somogyvári, Katalin Héjja
Zoltán Mujahid	"On My Own"	Zoltán Mujahid, Johnny K. Palmer
Enikő Muri	"Jericho"	Sebastian Arman, Joacim Persson
Benjámin Pál	"Father's Eyes"	Zoltán G. Tóth, Péter Halász
Joci Pápai	"Origo"	József Pápai
Peet Project	"Kill Your Monster"	Péter Ferencz, Olivér Magán, Dávid Henderson
Gigi Radics	"See It Through"	Georgina Radics, Tamás Radics, Zoltán Riba, Johnny K. Palmer
Rocktenors	"Ősz"	Márió Mező, Márk Táborosi, Zoltán Mező
Roma Soul	"Nyitva a ház"	István Farkas, Tamás Pajor
Orsi Sapszon	"Hunyd le szemed"	Bálint Sapszon, Dóra Csenki, Orsolya Sapszon
Viki Singh	"Rain"	Szabolcs Harmath, Angelika Iványi
Soulwave	"Kalandor"	Máté Fodor, Ádám Huszár, Gábor Góczán, Ferenc Szabó
Spoon 21	"Deák"	Péter Földesi, Márton Grósz, Miklós Adrián Nagy, Kristóf Teremy
Ádám Szabó	"Together"	Dániel Somogyvári, Ádám Szabó, Kata Kozma
Szabyest	"Szerelem kell"	Szabolcs Achilles Szabó
Andi Tóth	"I've Got a Fire"	Johnny K. Palmer, Dániel Somogyvári
Gabi Tóth and Freddie Shuman feat. Begi Lotfi	"Hosszú idők"	Gabriella Tóth, Tibor Molnár, Begi Lotfi, Dávid Nagy
The Wings	"Mint a hurrikán!"	Balázs Szobolits
Zävodi and Olivér Berkes	"#háttérzaj"	Marcel Závodi, Gábor Závodi

==== Shows ====
===== Heats =====
Three heats took place on 14 January, 28 January and 4 February 2017. The second heat was originally to take place on 21 January 2017, but a few hours before the show, it was announced that the heat would be postponed, due to the 2017 Verona bus crash, where several Hungarian students were killed. The timeslot was replaced by a vigil for the victims of the accident. The new date for the heat was announced on 24 January; the original third heat took place as scheduled as the second heat, with the original second heat taking place one week later as the new third heat.

In each heat ten entries competed and six entries qualified to the semi-finals after two rounds of voting. In the first round of voting, five qualifiers were determined by the combination of scores from each judge and an aggregate score from a public SMS and mobile app vote. In the second round of voting, the remaining five entries that were not in the initial top five faced a public vote consisting of votes submitted through SMS in order to determine one additional qualifier. In addition to the competing entries, other performers featured during the shows. Margaret Island performed as the interval act in heat 1, Csaba Vastag performed in heat 2, and Irie Maffia performed in heat 3.

Jury and public voting qualifier Public voting qualifier

Heat 1 – 14 January 2017
R/O	Artist	Song	Caramel	Zséda	K. Frenreisz	M. Both	Viewers	Total	Result
1	Dávid Henderson	"White Shadows"	9	8	8	7	5	37	Advanced
2	Leander Kills	"Élet"	9	8	8	9	6	40	Advanced
3	Calidora	"Glory"	7	7	5	6	5	30	—N/a
4	The Wings	"Mint a hurrikán"	7	7	7	6	5	32	—N/a
5	Viki Singh	"Rain"	9	9	8	7	6	39	Advanced
6	Spoon 21	"Deák"	9	9	8	7	6	39	Advanced
7	Kata Csondor	"Create"	6	7	6	7	6	32	—N/a
8	Benji	"Karcok"	6	8	9	7	6	36	Advanced
9	Rocktenors	"Ősz"	7	7	7	6	6	33	—N/a
10	Roma Soul	"Nyitva a ház"	9	8	8	9	6	40	Advanced

Heat 2 – 28 January 2017
R/O	Artist	Song	Caramel	Zséda	K. Frenreisz	M. Both	Viewers	Total	Result
1	Peet Project	"Kill Your Monster"	8	9	9	8	6	40	Advanced
2	Andi Tóth	"I've Got a Fire"	7	8	7	6	6	34	—N/a
3	AnnaElza feat. Juli Kása	"Jártam"	8	7	6	8	5	34	—N/a
4	Chase	"Dust in the Wind"	9	9	8	7	6	39	Advanced
5	Mrs. Columbo	"Frozen King"	8	8	8	8	6	38	Advanced
6	Kállay Saunders Band	"17"	9	9	9	8	7	42	Advanced
7	Zoltán Mujahid	"On My Own"	8	8	7	6	7	36	—N/a
8	Peter Kovary and the Royal Rebels	"It's a Riot"	8	7	8	7	6	36	—N/a
9	Gina Kanizsa	"Fall Like Rain"	10	9	9	9	5	42	Advanced
10	Ádám Szabó	"Together"	8	8	7	7	8	38	Advanced

Heat 3 – 4 February 2017
R/O	Artist	Song	Caramel	Zséda	K. Frenreisz	M. Both	Viewers	Total	Result
1	Kyra Fedor	"Got to Be a Day"	7	7	8	6	6	34	—N/a
2	Zävodi and Olivér Berkes	"#háttérzaj"	9	9	9	9	5	41	Advanced
3	Gabi Tóth and Freddie Shuman feat. Begi Lotfi	"Hosszú idők"	9	9	8	8	7	41	Advanced
4	Orsi Sapszon	"Hunyd le szemed"	8	8	8	8	5	37	—N/a
5	Soulwave	"Kalandor"	7	8	6	6	7	34	Advanced
6	The Couple	"Vége van"	8	8	8	9	5	38	Advanced
7	Enikő Muri	"Jericho"	8	8	7	7	6	36	—N/a
8	Benjámin Pál	"Father's Eyes"	8	8	8	6	7	37	—N/a
9	Gigi Radics	"See It Through"	10	9	9	8	7	43	Advanced
10	Joci Pápai	"Origo"	10	9	8	8	6	41	Advanced

===== Semi-finals =====
Two semi-finals took place on 10 and 11 February 2017. In each semi-final nine entries competed and four entries qualified to the final after two rounds of voting. In the first round of voting, three qualifiers were determined by the combination of scores from each judge and an aggregate score from a public SMS and mobile app vote. In the second round of voting, the remaining six entries that were not in the initial top three faced a public vote consisting of votes submitted through SMS in order to determine one additional qualifier.

In addition to the competing entries, other performers featured during the shows. Szilvia Péter Szabó performed as the interval act in semi-final 1 and Magdi Rúzsa performed in semi-final 2.

Jury and public voting qualifier Public voting qualifier

Semi-final 1 – 10 February 2017
R/O	Artist	Song	Caramel	Zséda	K. Frenreisz	M. Both	Viewers	Total	Result
1	Soulwave	"Kalandor"	8	8	7	7	7	37	Advanced
2	Viki Singh	"Rain"	8	8	9	7	6	38	—N/a
3	Chase	"Dust in the Wind"	8	8	8	7	6	37	—N/a
4	The Couple	"Vége van"	8	7	7	9	5	36	—N/a
5	Spoon 21	"Deák"	8	8	8	7	6	37	—N/a
6	Gigi Radics	"See It Through"	9	9	9	8	7	42	Advanced
7	Dávid Henderson	"White Shadows"	8	7	8	8	6	37	—N/a
8	Joci Pápai	"Origo"	10	10	9	9	7	45	Advanced
9	Gina Kanizsa	"Fall Like Rain"	10	10	10	10	5	45	Advanced

Semi-final 2 – 11 February 2017
R/O	Artist	Song	Caramel	Zséda	K. Frenreisz	M. Both	Viewers	Total	Result
1	Ádám Szabó	"Together"	8	8	7	7	7	37	—N/a
2	Mrs. Columbo	"Frozen King"	8	8	7	8	6	37	—N/a
3	Roma Soul	"Nyitva a ház"	9	8	7	8	6	38	—N/a
4	Peet Project	"Kill Your Monster"	8	9	8	7	6	38	—N/a
5	Kállay Saunders Band	"17"	9	9	9	8	7	42	Advanced
6	Zävodi and Olivér Berkes	"#háttérzaj"	10	9	10	9	5	43	Advanced
7	Leander Kills	"Élet"	9	10	9	9	6	43	Advanced
8	Gabi Tóth and Freddie Shuman feat. Begi Lotfi	"Hosszú idők"	9	10	9	9	7	44	Advanced
9	Benji	"Karcok"	8	7	7	6	5	33	—N/a

===== Final =====
The final took place on 18 February 2017 where the eight entries that qualified from the semi-finals competed. The winner of the competition was selected over two rounds of voting. In the first round, the jury determined the top four entries that advanced to the second round. The voting system for the four jurors was different from the method used in the heats and semi-finals. Each juror announced their scores after all songs had been performed rather than assigning scores following each performance and the jurors ranked their preferred top four entries and assigned points in the following manner: 4 (lowest), 6, 8 and 10 (highest). The four entries with the highest total scores proceeded to the second round. In the second round, "Origo" performed by Joci Pápai was selected as the winner via a public vote consisting of votes submitted through SMS, mobile app and online voting. In addition to the performances of the competing entries, guest performers included one of the judges, Caramel and A Dal 2016 winner and the 2016 Hungarian Eurovision entrant Freddie.

Advanced to the second round Winner

Final – First Round – 18 February 2017
R/O	Artist	Song	Caramel	Zséda	K. Frenreisz	M. Both	Total	Place
1	Gabi Tóth and Freddie Shuman feat. Begi Lotfi	"Hosszú idők"	4	4	0	4	12	5
2	Soulwave	"Kalandor"	0	0	0	0	0	7
3	Gigi Radics	"See It Through"	6	8	0	0	14	3
4	Kállay Saunders Band	"17"	0	0	0	0	0	8
5	Leander Kills	"Élet"	0	0	8	0	8	6
6	Zävodi and Olivér Berkes	"#háttérzaj"	8	6	10	6	30	2
7	Joci Pápai	"Origo"	10	10	6	8	34	1
8	Gina Kanizsa	"Fall Like Rain"	0	0	4	10	14	3

Final – Second Round – 18 February 2017
Artist	Song	Place
Gina Kanizsa	"Fall Like Rain"	—N/a
Joci Pápai	"Origo"	1
Gigi Radics	"See It Through"	—N/a
Zävodi and Olivér Berkes	"#háttérzaj"	—N/a

== At Eurovision ==
The Eurovision Song Contest 2017 took place at the International Exhibition Centre in Kyiv, Ukraine and consisted of two semi-finals on 9 and 11 May and the final on 13 May 2017. According to Eurovision rules, all nations with the exceptions of the host country and the "Big Five" (France, Germany, Italy, Spain and the United Kingdom) are required to qualify from one of two semi-finals in order to compete for the final; the top ten countries from each semi-final progress to the final. The European Broadcasting Union (EBU) split up the competing countries into six different pots based on voting patterns from previous contests, with countries with favourable voting histories put into the same pot.

=== Voting ===
==== Points awarded to Hungary ====
Points awarded to Hungary (Semi-final 2)
Score	Televote	Jury
12 points	Austria; Croatia; Romania; Serbia	Israel; Serbia
10 points	Belarus; Germany; Netherlands; San Marino	Croatia
8 points	Bulgaria; Estonia; Switzerland	
7 points	France; Israel	Ukraine
6 points	Ireland; Macedonia; Malta; Norway; Ukraine	
5 points	Lithuania	Macedonia; Switzerland
4 points	Denmark	
3 points		Austria; Denmark; San Marino
2 points		Estonia; Lithuania; Norway
1 point		

Points awarded to Hungary (Final)
Score	Televote	Jury
12 points	Croatia; Serbia	Croatia
10 points	Romania	Serbia
8 points	Belarus; Estonia	Ukraine
7 points	Azerbaijan; Montenegro	
6 points	Albania; Bulgaria; Netherlands	
5 points	Austria; Poland; Slovenia; Switzerland	Austria
4 points	Finland; Italy; Norway; San Marino; Sweden; Ukraine	Iceland
3 points	Denmark; Germany; Macedonia	Malta; Switzerland
2 points	France; Iceland; Ireland; Latvia; Lithuania; Malta; Portugal	
1 point	Belgium; Israel; United Kingdom	Estonia; Germany; Moldova

==== Points awarded by Hungary ====
Points awarded by Hungary (Semi-final 2)
Score	Televote	Jury
12 points	Bulgaria	Bulgaria
10 points	Croatia	Netherlands
8 points	Israel	Austria
7 points	Romania	Norway
6 points	Netherlands	Denmark
5 points	Norway	Ireland
4 points	Estonia	Serbia
3 points	Austria	Belarus
2 points	Belarus	Macedonia
1 point	Switzerland	Israel

Points awarded by Hungary (Final)
Score	Televote	Jury
12 points	Bulgaria	Portugal
10 points	Moldova	Bulgaria
8 points	Belgium	Netherlands
7 points	Portugal	Australia
6 points	Romania	Norway
5 points	Croatia	Denmark
4 points	Italy	Azerbaijan
3 points	Sweden	United Kingdom
2 points	Cyprus	Armenia
1 point	France	Sweden

==== Detailed voting results ====
The following members comprised the Hungarian jury:

- Ferenc Molnár (Caramel; jury chairperson) – singer, songwriter
- Gábor Závodi – songwriter, producer, sound engineer
- Viktor Király – singer, songwriter
- Adrienn Zsédenyi (Zséda) – singer, actress
- Petra Várallyay – composer, singer, violinist

Detailed voting results from Hungary (Semi-final 2)
R/O	Country	Jury							Televote	
R/O	Country	Caramel	G. Závodi	V. Király	Zséda	P. Várallyay	Rank	Points	Rank	Points
01	Serbia	8	7	8	11	7	7	4	16	
02	Austria	2	5	1	4	4	3	8	8	3
03	Macedonia	6	11	7	12	12	9	2	12	
04	Malta	13	4	9	14	16	11		15	
05	Romania	17	17	17	17	17	17		4	7
06	Netherlands	3	2	3	1	5	2	10	5	6
07	Hungary									
08	Denmark	4	10	4	9	1	5	6	14	
09	Ireland	9	3	6	5	8	6	5	11	
10	San Marino	16	12	14	16	13	15		13	
11	Croatia	12	15	10	8	14	14		2	10
12	Norway	5	6	5	2	2	4	7	6	5
13	Switzerland	10	14	11	10	11	12		10	1
14	Belarus	7	8	13	13	6	8	3	9	2
15	Bulgaria	1	1	2	3	3	1	12	1	12
16	Lithuania	15	16	12	6	9	13		17	
17	Estonia	14	13	15	15	15	16		7	4
18	Israel	11	9	16	7	10	10	1	3	8

Detailed voting results from Hungary (Final)
R/O	Country	Jury							Televote	
R/O	Country	Caramel	G. Závodi	V. Király	Zséda	P. Várallyay	Rank	Points	Rank	Points
01	Israel	12	23	22	19	22	21		14	
02	Poland	19	7	17	18	17	17		12	
03	Belarus	14	17	18	12	16	15		20	
04	Austria	6	13	9	16	10	11		15	
05	Armenia	15	6	15	13	2	9	2	19	
06	Netherlands	4	3	2	3	3	3	8	11	
07	Moldova	17	16	10	11	15	14		2	10
08	Hungary									
09	Italy	16	15	21	22	18	20		7	4
10	Denmark	2	14	5	8	5	6	5	23	
11	Portugal	5	1	1	1	4	1	12	4	7
12	Azerbaijan	11	5	12	9	8	7	4	17	
13	Croatia	23	24	25	17	25	24		6	5
14	Australia	3	4	4	7	9	4	7	16	
15	Greece	22	19	19	24	21	22		21	
16	Spain	24	22	23	25	24	25		25	
17	Norway	7	9	6	4	1	5	6	13	
18	United Kingdom	8	12	7	5	14	8	3	18	
19	Cyprus	18	10	20	20	20	18		9	2
20	Romania	25	25	24	14	23	23		5	6
21	Germany	21	20	14	15	19	19		22	
22	Ukraine	13	18	16	23	7	16		24	
23	Belgium	20	21	8	6	13	13		3	8
24	Sweden	10	8	11	10	12	10	1	8	3
25	Bulgaria	1	2	3	2	6	2	10	1	12
26	France	9	11	13	21	11	12		10	1
