= Zävodi =

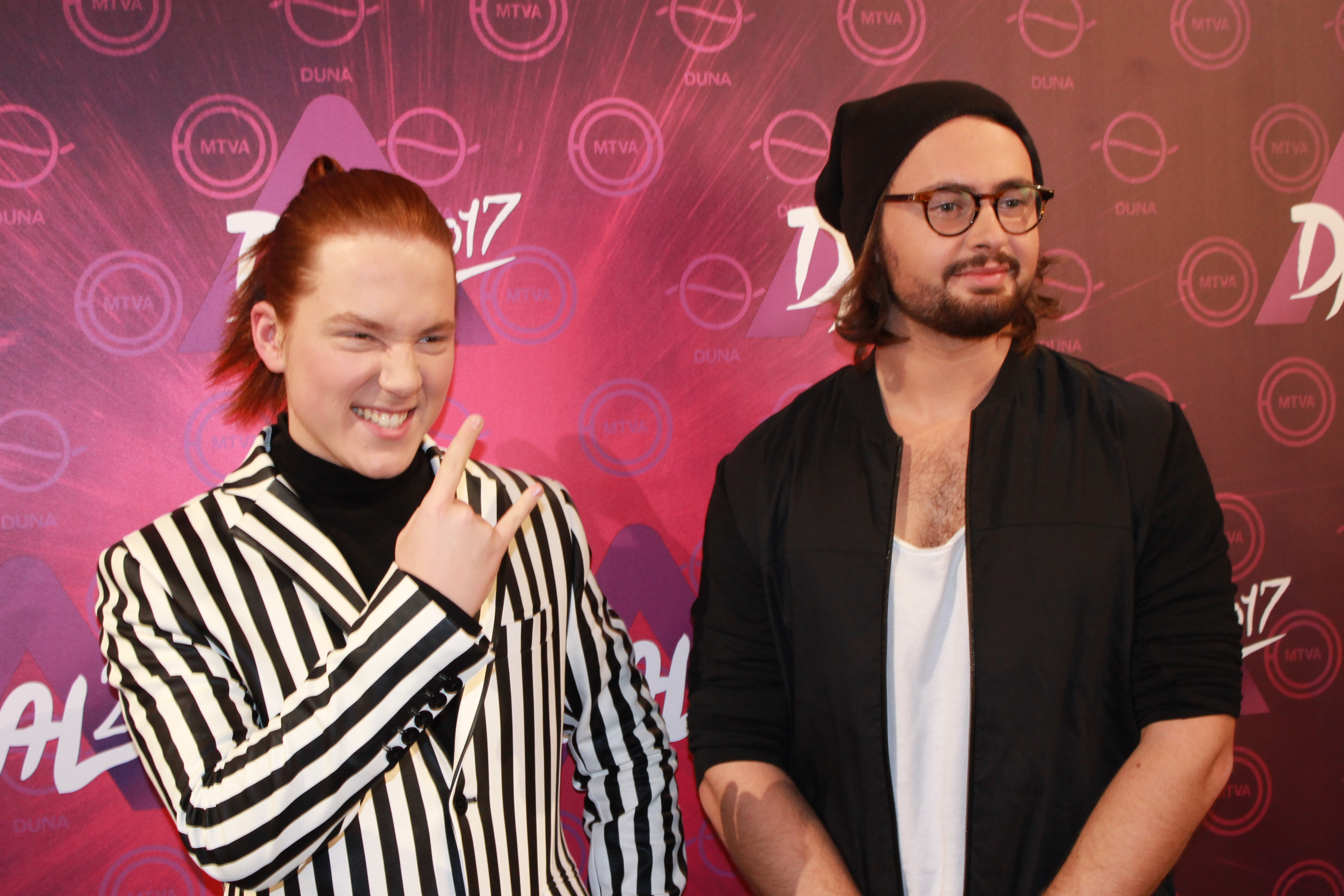
- Zävodi (left) and Olivér Berkes (right) on 10 February 2017.

Background information
- Birth name: Marcel Závodi
- Born: 4 June 1999 (age 25)
- Occupation: Singer
- Instrument(s): vocals, piano
- Years active: 2013–present
- Labels: Magneoton

Marcel Závodi, popularly known as Zävodi (born 4 June 1999), is a Hungarian singer-songwriter, most notable for participating in A Dal 2017.

== Career ==
At five years of age, Zävodi sang with Margit Földessy. During the administration of Róbert Alföldi, he played at the National Theatre, playing in Jagdszenen aus Niederbayern for three years, which was a part of the 2011 Audience Award, directed by Gergely Fonyó and was cast into Matula kalandpark. He also dubbed films, including Liv and Maddie at six and Hős hatos. By age 14, he signed up with the record producer Magneoton.

He released his first solo song, Say (sung by Ádám Szabó), which spawned a number of remixes. In the summer of 2016, he released a song with MC Kemon, titled Moneytalks, of which the video clip ranked the top five of music videos. In the summer of 2016, he became the keyboardist of the band of and music producer of Marge. Her most notable song with Zävodi was Repülünk. He also collaborated with Csaba Vastag in early 2016 with Phoenix. In the same year in November, he released a second song, Open Your Eyes. András Hajós approached him in the autumn of 2016 to ask him to participate in Dalfutár, a courier music show as a young producer. There, he met with Viktor Király, who he has been working together with. At the same time, he became part a music album produced by Linda Király. In December 2016, zeneszoveg.hu sent him to Poland as a delegate to an international music camp, where he represented Hungary.

On 8 December 2016, it was announced that Zävodi would participate in A Dal 2017, the 2017 edition of the Hungarian national selection for Hungary for the Eurovision Song Contest 2017. He performed in a duo with Olivér Berkes with the song #háttérzaj. They progressed to the final. He also co-wrote the Viktor Király song Budapest Girl, which is currently competing in A Dal 2018.

== Discography ==
=== Singles ===
- Moneytalks (with MC Kemmon)
- #háttérzaj (with Olivér Berkes)

== See also ==
- A Dal 2017
