= Soulwave =

Hungarian band

- Origin: Körmend, Hungary
- Genres: Alternative rock
- Years active: 2007–present
- Labels: Universal Music Group
- Members: Máté Fodor; Barnabas Tóth; Gergely Varga; Attila Pap
- Past members: Gábor Szeifert; Zsolt Mihály; András Németh; Dávid "Dave" Bencsics; Dr. Márton Lajos

Soulwave is a Hungarian indie and folk alternative rock band from Körmend.

== History ==
=== Formation: 2007–2009 ===
The band was founded in 2007 by singer Máté Fodor. Their first EP was recorded with Gábor Szeifert on bass and drummer Zsolt Mihály, titled "Butterflies EP". The EP was found by Karmatronic, the founder of Karmatronic Records, and afterwards, Soulwave released the band's first single titled Lonely, and was subsequently contracted to prepare another song, which ultimately was not issued. Their first video clip was that of their song Lonely.

=== First album and troubles: 2010–2012 ===
In 2010, their first album was released, titled One Night Stand. This first shows the rock and roll and blues influence that is an important element in Soulwaves' music. The album, however, did not bring a major success, and due to this the band was forced to shorter breaks, which were never officially announced. Fodor and Mihály still performed together, but they virtually and temporarily ceased Soulwave as a band.

=== Changes: 2012–2015 ===
After returning from the hiatus, Fodor and Ocho Macho member András Németh revived Soulwave and worked actively. After a number of domestic and foreign concerts, the Swedish Substream Records announced on the band's new EP, 1975, which began to show Soulwaves' contemporary influences. The EP was critically acclaimed in Hungary, and their subsequent singles, I Can't Be Loved and Gimme Gimme, both debuted on Petőfi Radio. Subsequently, the band has performed in several countries and made their domestic debut at festivals and senior clubs. Their first television appearances were in 2014 on the Magyar Televízió show Szerencseszombat and Petőfi Radio and MR2 Akusztik entitled on live radio.

=== Record deal and A Dal 2017: 2015–present ===
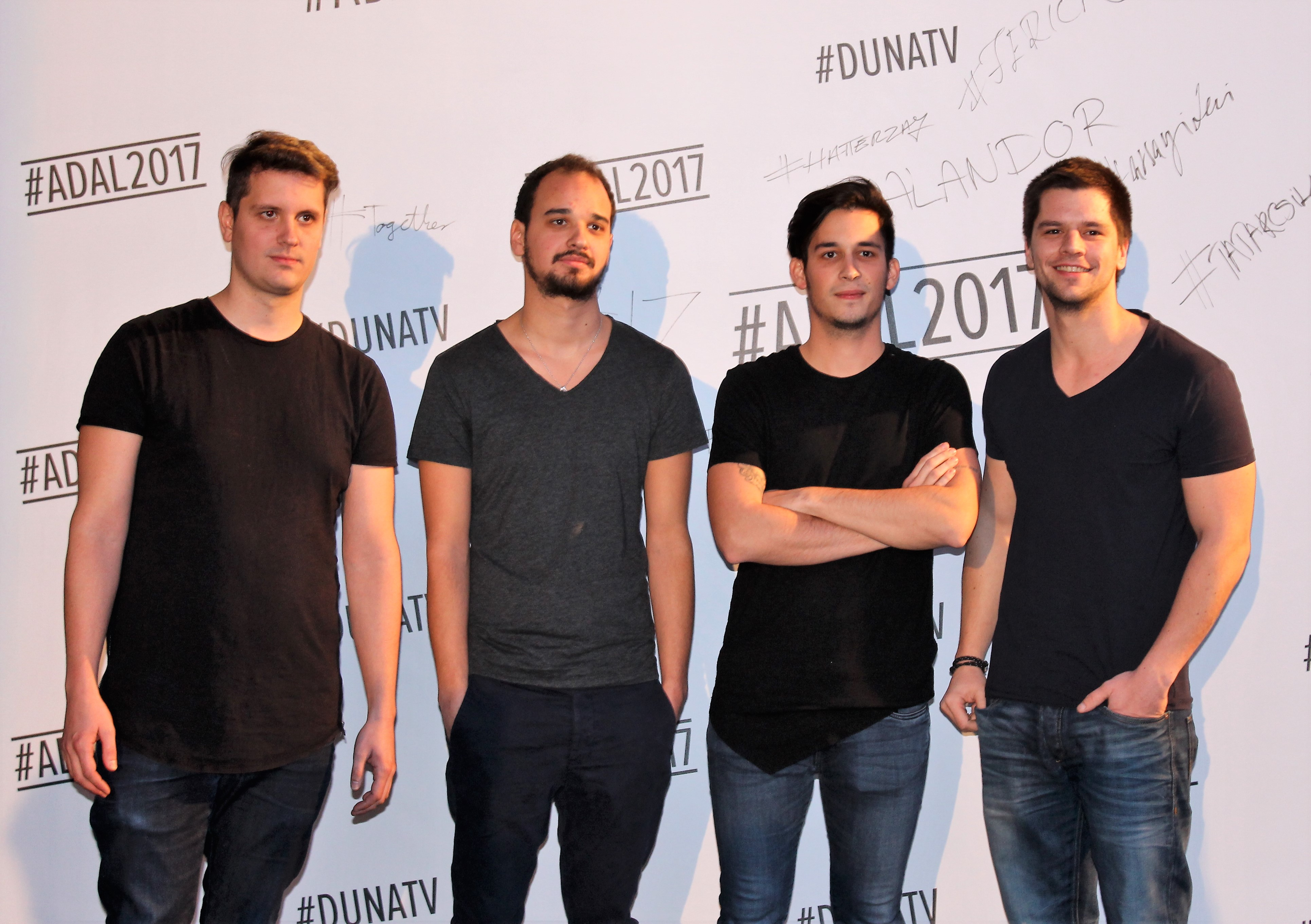
Soulwave in 2016

Domestic interest increased in Soulwave, which released its first Hungarian-language song, Szélcsend, which also debuted on Petőfi Radio and topped at 27th place on national music charts, which had a decisive influence on the band's decision to further record Hungarian songs. Soulwave signed a recording contract with Universal Music Group, the main music publisher of Hungary. Their first single under Universal was Mindent Elhittem which was a hit. The video clip on VIVA TV local chart was ranked the sixth best music video for 2015. This was followed by Kalandor, which instantly became another hit and simultaneously topped the charts again. Kalandor is also their entry into A Dal 2017, the national selection for Hungary in the Eurovision Song Contest 2017. They have progressed to the finals.

== Members ==
- Máté Fodor - vocals
- Gergely Varga - guitar
- Ádám Huszár - guitar
- Ferenc Szabó
- Attila Pap - bass guitar
- Barnabas Tóth - drums and percussion

=== Former members ===
- Gábor Szeifert - bass guitar
- Zsolt Mihály - drums
- András Németh - guitar
- Dávid "Dave" Bencsics - bass guitar
- Dr. Márton Lajos - drums

== Discography ==
| Year | | Top position | | | | | Album |
| Year | | MAHASZ Radio Top 40 | MAHASZ Singles | Class FM | Petőfi TOP 40 | Viva Chart | Album |
|---|---|---|---|---|---|---|---|
| 2014 | Szélcsend | | | | 27 | | – |
| 2016 | Mindent elhittem | | | | 11 | 5 | |
| 2016 | Kalandor | 3 | 2 | 1 | 1 | | – |
| 2017 | Szaladok | 17 | | | 1 | | |
