= Kata Csondor =

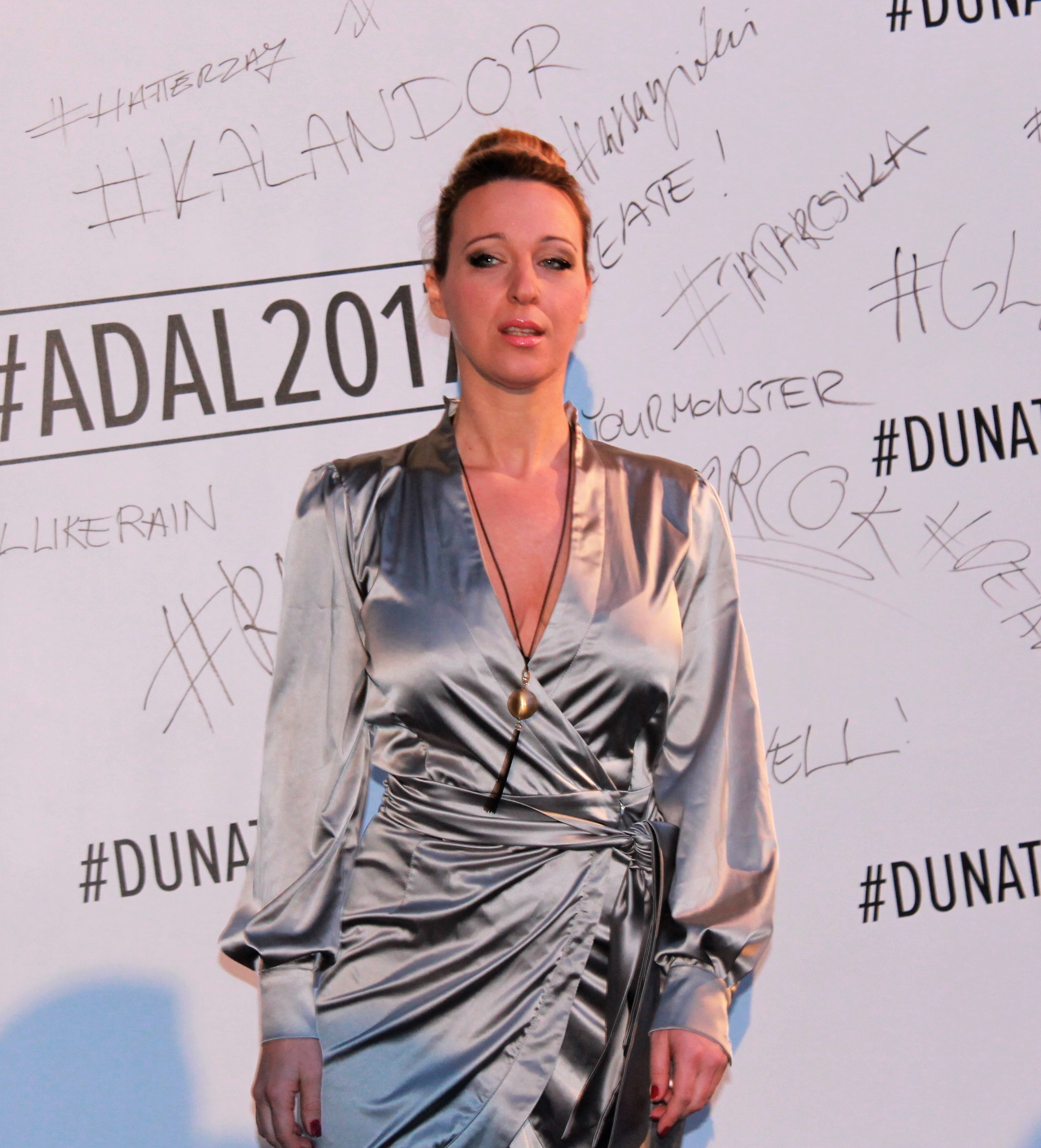
- Csondor in 2016

Background information
- Born: 15 March 1978 (age 48); Budapest, Hungary
- Occupations: Voice actress; singer; songwriter
- Years active: 1989–present

Kata Csondor (born 15 March 1978) is a Hungarian voice actress, singer, and songwriter.

== Career ==
Csondor has dubbed since childhood. Some of her most well-known dubs were that of Chloe Sullivan in the TV series Smallville and Black Widow Scarlett Johansson in the movie Avengers. She also sings. In the Christmas season of 2009 she sang the "Hóban ébred majd az ünnep, minden percben nevet ránk" jingle for the Hungarian branch of T-Mobile's advertising, which was later brought back by popular demand. Ágnes Szabó wrote the lyrics, while Gábor Madarász wrote the music. Titeled "Add tovább" Song has become not only a hit but a Christmas anthem since then. This is the most covered Hungarian song on the internet with over 500 covers. In 2012, she released her first album: "Hóban ébred...az ünnep dalai", which charted on the "MAHASZ Top 40" list, and in 2013, was nominated for the Fonogram award for "Best home entertainment musical album of the year." In December 2016, it was announced that she would compete at A Dal 2017, the national selection for Hungary in the Eurovision Song Contest 2017, with the song Create.
