= Freddie Shuman =

Hungarian musician, born 1990

Tibor Attila Molnár, known popularly as Freddie Shuman (born 30 September 1990, Szeged, Hungary) is a Hungarian composer, artist, and frontman of the band Tha Shudras. He is also known for competing in A Dal 2017 with Gabi Tóth and Begi Lotfi.

== Career ==
Born in Szeged, he was born to a chemist and a physicist. He became interested in music in elementary school at the age of seven and became acquainted with theatre and dance as well. He began writing poetry at the age of nine, which was furthered during his gymnasium years. After a decade, he has become a prominent element of the hip-hop underground, and at the age of 18, attended private singing lessons in jazz bands and singing. There, he began to employ the instrumentation and computer songwriting during that time. He was also the frontman for the band Tha Shudras.

On 8 December 2016, it was announced that Freddie Shuman would participate in A Dal 2017, the 2017 edition of the Hungarian national selection for Hungary for the Eurovision Song Contest 2017. He is performing with Gabi Tóth and Begi Lotfi with the song Hosszú idők. They progressed to the finals.

== See also ==
- A Dal 2017
- Gabi Tóth
- Begi Lotfi
