= Olivér Berkes =

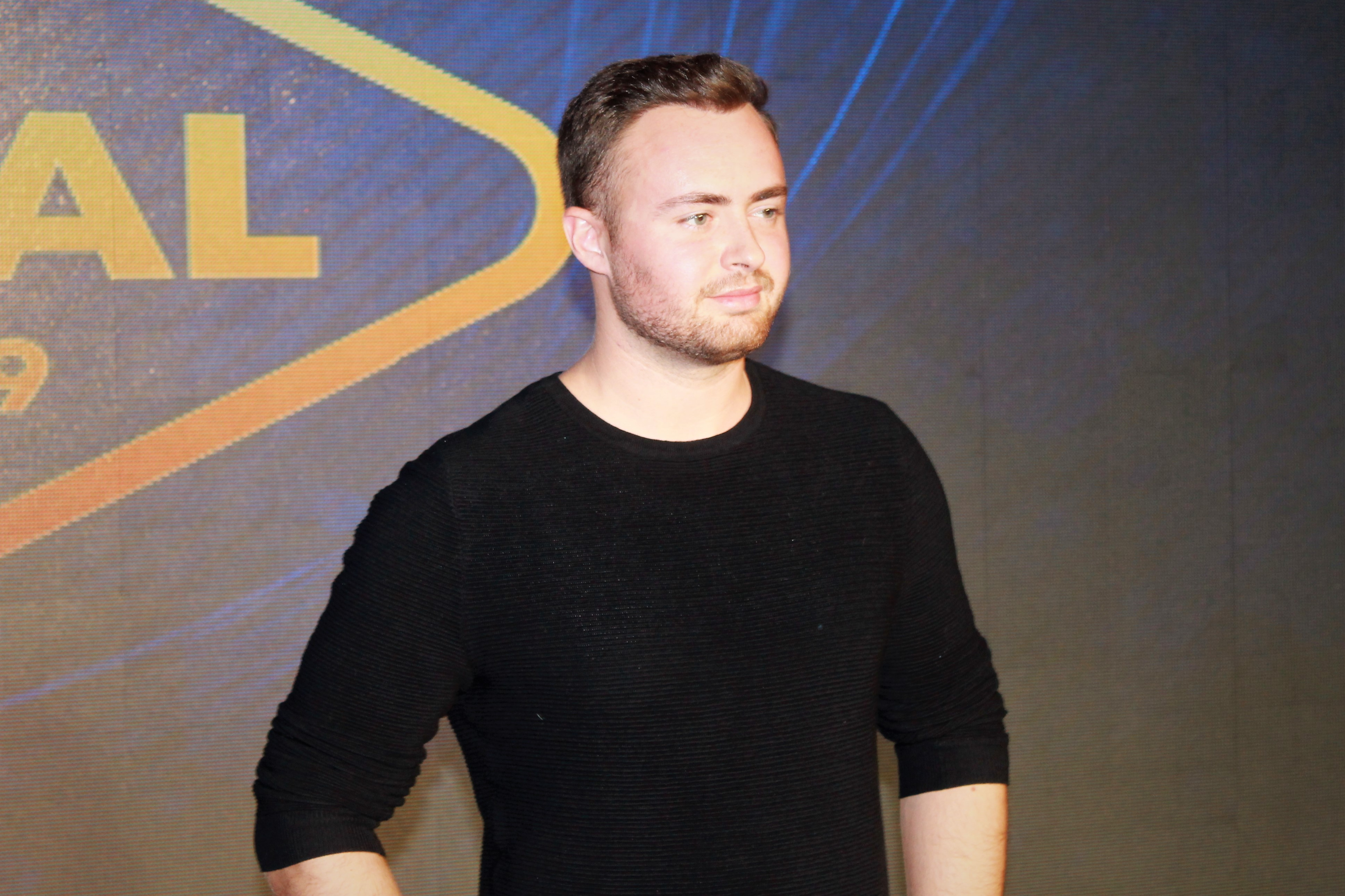
- Olivér Berkes in 2018.

Background information
- Born: 13 August 1992 (age 33); Nuremberg, Germany
- Occupation: Singer
- Instrument: vocals
- Years active: 2012–present

Olivér Berkes (born 13 August 1992, Nuremberg, Germany) is a Hungarian singer-songwriter. Born in Germany, at the age of 5, he moved with his family to Hungary and is currently an International Business School student. While playing competitive tennis for a long time, his music career was launched in 2012 by competing in the Hungarian version of The Voice, The Voice – Magyarország hangja, where, as a member of Caramel's team, he reached the semi-finals. Since then, he regularly performs and is a permanent member of the club Orpheum Pest, where he most notably acts in an adaptation of The Great Gatsby, where he performed the role of Jay Gatsby.

His first solo song was titled Első érintés, created along with DJ Newikkel, and Goodbye in 2014 has been on popular domestic music radio stations.

In 2015, he published his first solo album and EP titled Don't Be Anxious. He has thrice participated in A Dal, the Hungarian national selection for Hungary in the Eurovision Song Contest: First in 2016, in a duet with Andi Tóth and titled Seven Seas, and reached the final. He also competed in A Dal 2017, in another duet, this time with Zävodi, titled #háttérzaj. They progressed to the final. He also competed in A Dal 2019, this time as a solo artist with the song Viágítótorony, where he failed to qualify past the heat.

== Discography ==
=== Singles ===
- Give Me Some
- Goodbye
- Don't Be Anxious
- Seven Seas (with Andi Tóth; A Dal 2016)
- #háttérzaj (with Zävodi; A Dal 2017)
- Viágítótorony (A Dal 2019)
