= Rocktenors =

Hungarian rock band

- Origin: Szigetszentmiklos, Hungary
- Genres: Rock
- Years active: 2010–present
- Label: Sony Music Hungary
- Members: Zoltán Mező; Márió Mező; Márk Táborosi

Rocktenors is a Hungarian rock band from Szigetszentmiklos formed in 2010, which was started by the second season of the RTL Klub series X-Faktor, and came in sixth place, and subsequently became one of the most successful groups in the series.

== History ==
=== 2010–2011 – Origins and X-Faktor ===
Rocktenors was founded in 2010 by Zoltán Mező, Márió Mező, and Márk Táborosi. The three of them met at the Sziget Theatre, where they had worked as actors for six years. They initially launched under the name "The 3 Rock Tenors".

Their first song was a cover of Metallica's "Nothing Else Matters", which later successfully passed the qualification round of X-Faktor. Their mentor was Péter Geszti.

The band's first live broadcast in X-Faktor was with "Bad" by Michael Jackson. Mentors liked the majority of productions, with Miklós Malek saying "Geszti and Rocktenors puts out rock". They were ultimately successful in a duel based on viewers' votes with the Queen song "The Show Must Go On" song against Tibor Gyurcsík. Gyurcsík was voted against by Geszti, while Malek and Ildikó Keresztes voted against the Rocktenors.

In the second round of X-Faktor, they played a 300-year old Adagio.

They then, on the third day, played Rolling Stones' "(I Can't Get No) Satisfaction". For Feró and Keresztes, while there was too much choreography, the rock was held and urged them to safely undertake themselves because they did not need others to imitate like a parody. The band's duel against Ikrek with the Queen song "Who Wants To Live Forever", which was won once again voted by judges. Malek said the team duel was "overwhelmingly well-sung."

On the fourth day, Rocktenors sang the Northern Kings cover of the A-ha song "Take On Me". Again, they were dueling position, this time by the mentor of the other team, Apollo23. The band sang "Always" by Bon Jovi. Geszti and Keresztes voted against the Rocktenors, while Malek and Feró voted against Apollo23, tying the vote. The viewers' votes surprisingly fell out of the Apollo23.

In the fifth round, they performed "Don't Cry" by Guns N' Roses and was unanimously beloved by the mentors and the spectators.

At the sixth round, they then performed the Santana & Chad Kroeger song "Into The Night", which successfully passed again, this time in the top 6th

On the seventh live show, they sang Fecó Balázss' "Homok a szélben". The performance was well received by the jury, with Malek saying that "It was the best I've ever been on the show." In their final show, the team lost the duel against Tamvs Tarány when they sang Aerosmith's "I Don't Want to Miss a Thing".

Live broadcasts and results of their X-Faktor performances
Broadcast	Song	Bottom two showdown	Result
Audition	"Nothing Else Matters"	N/A	Through
Top 150	"Elég Volt"	N/A	Through
Top 50	"Smooth Criminal"	N/A	Through
Week 1	"Bad"/"Thriller"	"The Show Must Go On"	Safe
Week 2	"Adagio"	N/A	Safe
Week 3	"(I Can't Get No) Satisfaction"	"Who Wants to Live Forever"	Safe
Week 4	"Take On Me"	"Always"	Safe
Week 5	"Don't Cry"	N/A	Safe
Week 6	"Into the Night"	N/A	Safe
Week 7	"Homok a Szélben"	"I Don't Want to Miss a Thing"	Eliminated

Rocktenors, on the final show, performed their first song, "Szabadság", which Marió Mező composed.

The end of the X-Factor live broadcasts of the threes tour started in the year 2011 with an album of the Top 6 contestants for sale. Their first concert was held on 21 December in front of more than 8,000 people.

=== 2012–present – Tours and singles, A Dal 2017 ===
Rocktenors were a part of the X-Faktor nationwide tour in Hungary and nearby major cities. The concerts ended after a showing in Transylvania. The group of nearly 300 independent shows, among them, most in Hungary and abroad (Transylvania, Slovakia).

Some performances - "Do not Cry" and "Adagio", was featured on the compilation album, which was issued in 2011 under the program. Their first album came out in the summer of 2012, Ha menni kell. The band's third album, Szabadesés, was published in January 2013, which was an independent compilation album released by Sony Music Hungary. The song appeared in the 2013 Eurovision Song Contest as well.

The second single album, Szív Nélkül, was released by Edge Records on 20 November 2013.

While not initially chosen to participate in the 2017 edition of A Dal, the national selection for Hungary at the Eurovision Song Contest 2017 in Ukraine, Szabyest, one of the singers that were selected, was disqualified for releasing his song before the 1 September cut-off point. On 4 January 2017, Rocktenors was announced as his replacement. They participated in the first semi-final on 14 January 2017 with the song Ősz, and were eliminated.

== Theatre careers ==
The band also has a parallel acting career, separate from their musical career. Many of their plays at the Sziget Theatre include Jesus Christ Superstar, Hair, Joseph and the Amazing Technicolor Dreamcoat, and István, a király. They also performed many musicals and numerous operettas that include Die Csárdásfürstin and The Marriage Market. Zoltán and Márk also performed Starfactory, Zoltán's play, at Thalia Theatre in 2013. In December 2012, Márk and Márió were included in a production of Dance of the Vampires at the Hungarian Theatre. Zoltán, in 2012, was included in the Madách Theatres production of Macskák, playing as Mefisztulész.

They also toured theatres in other countries, including Austria, Germany, and Switzerland.

== Discography ==
Type	Year	Album	Song	Producer
Selection	2011	X-Faktor – A 10 legjobb	Don't Cry	Sony Music Hungary
Selection	2012	X-Faktor – Love – 10 szerelmes dal	Adagio	Sony Music Hungary
Single	2012	Ha menni kell	Ha menni kell	Sony Music Hungary
Selection	2012	X-Faktor 2011 – Az első saját dalom	Ha menni kell	Sony Music Hungary
Selection	2013	Eurovíziós Dalfesztivál 2013 – A Sony Music jelöltjei	Szabadesés	Sony Music Hungary
Single	2013	Szív nélkül	Szív nélkül	Edge Records (HMR Music Kft.)
Single	2014	Szabadság	Szabadság	Edge Records (HMR Music Kft.)
