= Benji (singer) =

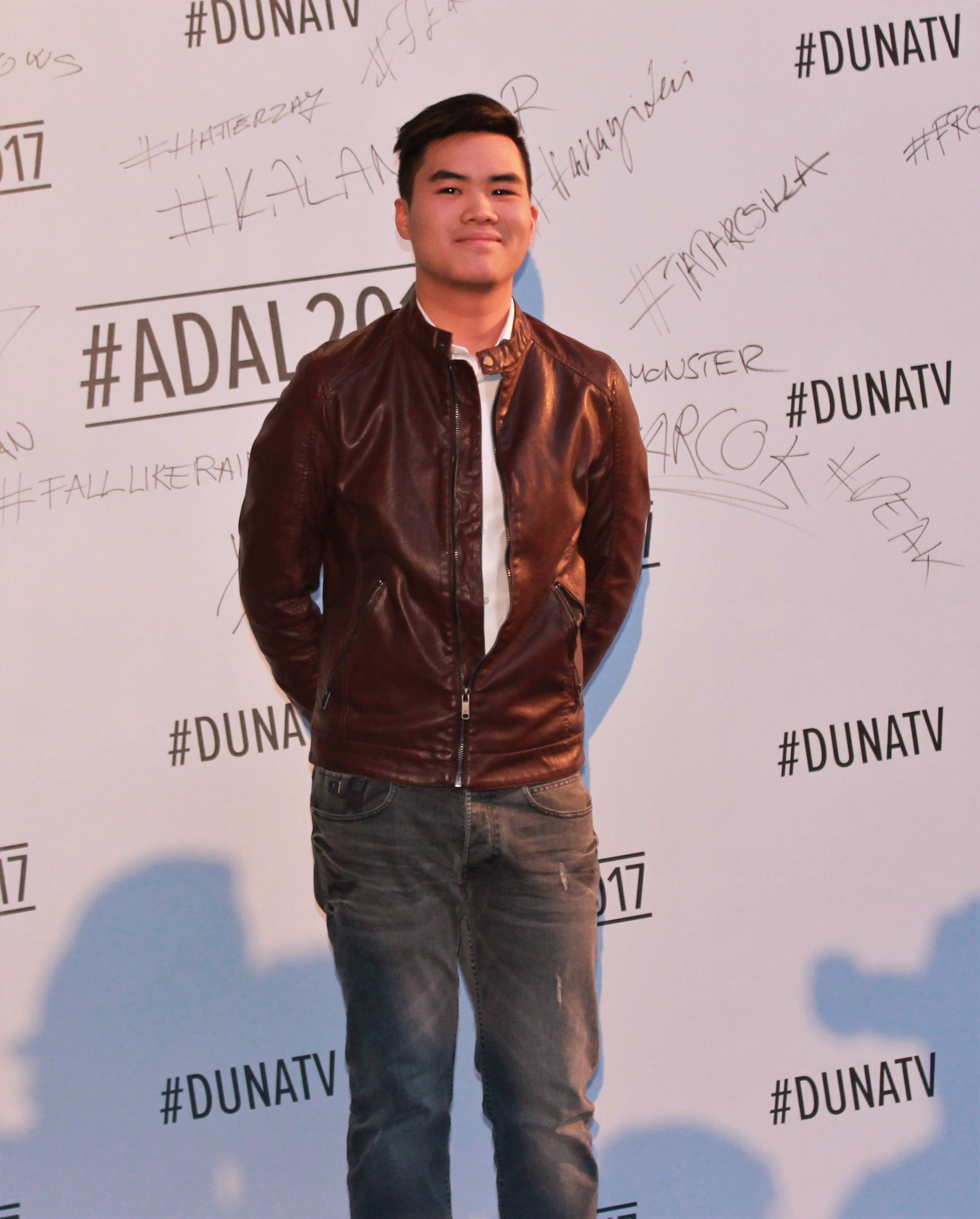
- Benji in 2016

Background information
- Born: Quang Huy Le; December 9, 1997 (age 27); Budapest, Hungary
- Years active: 2015–present

Huy Quang Le (born 9 December 1997), known professionally as Benji, is a Hungarian singer-songwriter, known for coming in third place in X-Faktor and his participations in A Dal 2016 and 2017.

== Life ==
He was born 9 December 1997 in Budapest. His parents are Vietnamese. Since his childhood, he has held an interest in music and plays several instruments.

In 2014, he participated in the fifth series of X-Faktor and was included in the subsequent webcast by mentor Róbert Alföldi. In addition to approval by the three judges, he was a fourth competitor in his class. Benji became one of the contenders to potentially win. Benji eventually finished the race and was named the best in the male group in that season of X-Faktor, in third place.

In the summer of 2015, he released his first self-titled song, Atmosphere.

In 2016, Benji participated in A Dal 2016, the national selection for Hungary in the Eurovision Song Contest with the song Kötéltánc.

In the spring of 2016, he released a new song entitled New Day.

He later released a song entitled Filteres álmok along with a music video. This song was the biggest radio hit of his career as it was, for 7 weeks, featured on the MAHASZ Playing Radio Top 40 list, and peaked at 15th.

In 2017, Benji again participated in A Dal, this time in the 2017 edition, with the song Karcok. He qualified to the semi-finals and was eliminated.

== Discography ==
=== Singles ===
- 2015 – Atmosphere/Az élet szép
- 2016 – Kötéltánc (A Dal 2016)
- 2016 – New Day
- 2016 – Filteres álmok
- 2016 – Karcok (A Dal 2017)

== More information ==
- Benji on Facebook
