= Andi Tóth =

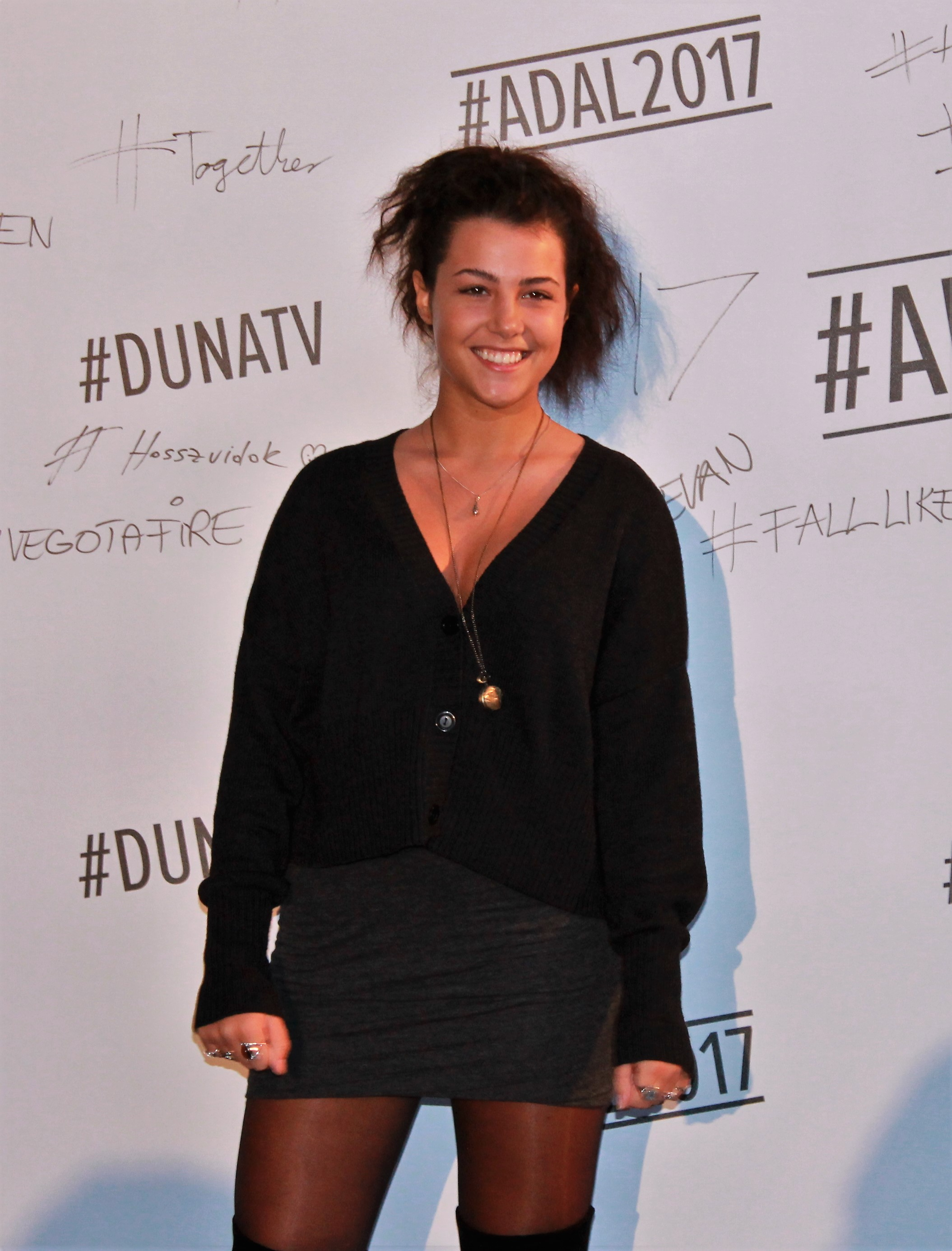
- Tóth in 2016

Background information
- Born: Andrea Tóth; 18 January 1999 (age 27); Oradea, Transylvania, Romania
- Occupation: Singer
- Instrument: Vocals
- Years active: 2012–present

Andrea "Andi" Tóth (born 18 January 1999) is a Hungarian actress and singer, most notable for winning of the fifth series of X-Faktor, acting in the television show Válótársak, and for participating in A Dal.

== Life ==
Tóth was born in Oradea (Nagyvárad), in Romania on 18 January 1999. She has been interested in singing since childhood and went to the Lyceum of Arts in her hometown, where she studied drawing. By age 13, she had already participated in various competitions and small performances. In 2014, she participated in the fifth season of X Faktor, of which she did not duel until the finale, and won. She became one youngest winners in X Factor history, as well as the first winner in Hungary from the Girls category. She was mentored by Róbert Szikora.

In 2015, the then 16-year-old released her first music video for Legyek én!, and was cast in Madách Theatre's production of Les Misérables. She then was a part of a new series on RTL Klub, Válótársak, as Noémi Jakab.

In 2016, she participated in A Dal 2016, the 2016 of the national selection of Hungary for the Eurovision Song Contest, in a duet with Olivér Berkes, with the song "Seven Seas". In 2016, she also released Itt vagyok! and Tovább.

She competed in A Dal 2017 with the song "I've got a Fire" and was eliminated in the second heat.

She currently acts at the Madách Theatre. She last played Eponine in Les Misérables.

== X-Faktor ==
- Legyen valami
- Let's Get Rocked
- Purple Rain
- Walk This Way
- Right Here Waiting
- The Show Must Go On
- Free Your Mind
- Jailhouse Rock
- Cabaret
- Ő még csak most 14
- Sweet Child O' Mine
- No Diggity/Shout
- Elég volt
- I Will Always Love You
- One Night Only
- Játszom
- Shake up Christmas
- Legyek én! (Winning song)

== Discography ==
=== Chart-topping songs ===
Year	Song	Highest rank							Album
Year	Song	VIVA Chart	Class 40	MAHASZ Editors' Choice	MAHASZ Rádiós Top 40	MAHASZ Dance Top 40	MAHASZ Single (track) Top 10	EURO 200	Album
2015	Legyek én!								
2016	Seven Seas (duet with Olivér Berkes)								
2016	Itt vagyok!								
2016	Tovább								
2016	I've got a Fire								
		Totals							
#1 position									
Top 10 positions									
Top 40 positions									

== Personal life ==
She has briefly dated with Hungarian singer Peti Marics from the music duo Valmar. They broke up in March 2023.
