= Gabi Tóth =

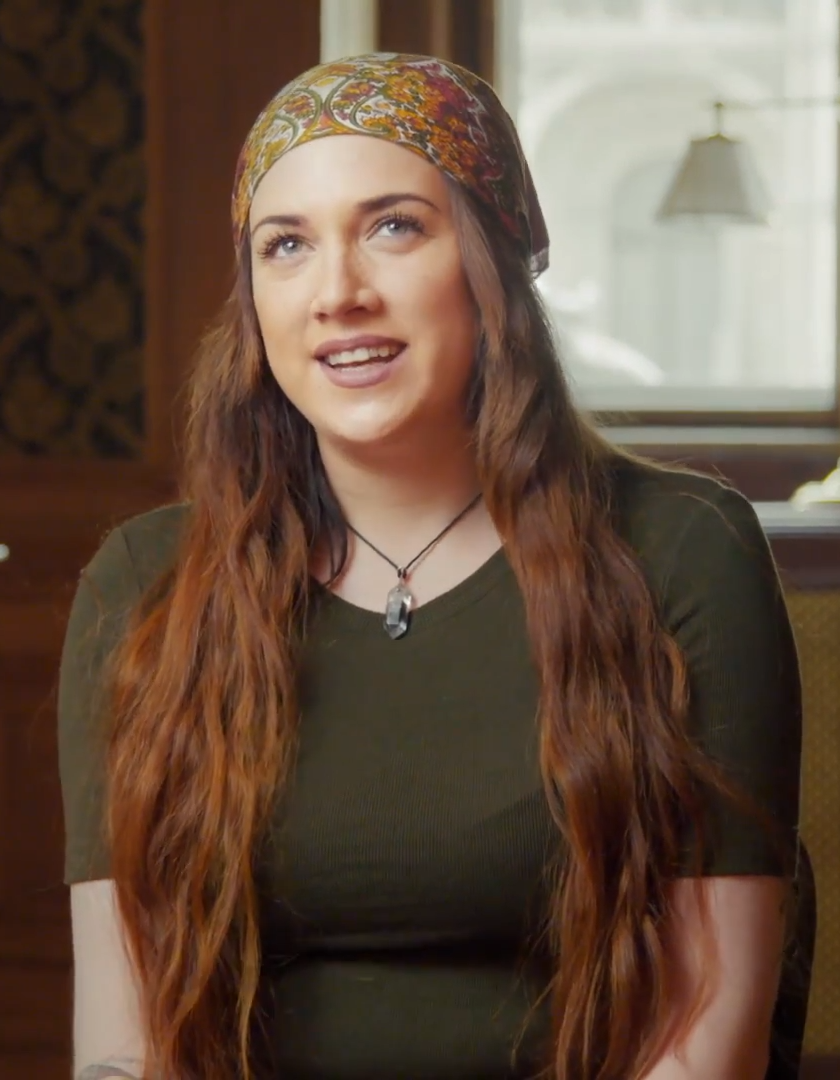
- Tóth in 2017

Background information
- Also known as: Kárpátok Madonnája
- Born: Gabriella Tóth; 17 January 1988 (age 38); Tapolca, Hungary
- Genre: Pop
- Occupation: Singer
- Instrument: Vocals
- Years active: 2004–present

Gabriella Tóth (born 17 January 1988), also known as Gabi Tóth is a Hungarian television personality, dancer and singer. She was featured as a mentor on X-Faktor from 2013 to 2016. Her sister, Vera Tóth, is also a Hungarian singer, who won the first season of Megasztár.

== Life ==
Tóth began her career in the Autumn of 2004 the second season of Megasztár, where she placed third and also achieved the best female artist prize for 2005. Her debut album Fekete virág was released in 2005. Two of the songs, the titular Fekete virág and Vágyom rád had music videos. The album was released in concert in 2006 at Müpa Budapest with a live orchestral accompaniment and an opening with TNT in the evening. A single, Szívemet adnám, was released in 2007, along with a video clip. Later that year, she starred in the VIVA Hungary reality show A Stáb, along with Tamás Molnár and Linda Zimány, which became the most watched show of VIVA Hungary.

In 2008, Tóth became one of the faces of the Tiszta Fejjel Projekt. Her songs have been featured on their video clips. She has worked with composer Tibor Kasza on her second full album, which was released in 2009. Tóth numbers begin to pick up and completed by the latest clip to the song Salalla. The following year, it appeared on her second studio album Elég volt!. In 2010, she was a guest performer on X-Faktor and recorded the theme for the reality TV show Való Világ for its fourth series. The song was so successful that it was also used in the fifth, sixth and seventh seasons.

In 2012, Tóth participated in A Dal, the national selection process for Hungary in the Eurovision Song Contest for that year where the audience and the professional jury chose who would represent Hungary at the 2012 Eurovision Song Contest. She participated with the song Nem Kell Végszó and came in a tied 5th place overall. The song came into 4th place on the MAHASZ song charts. In 2013, she became a mentor on the X-Faktor along with Péter Geszti, Róbert Szikora, and Róbert Alföldi. In 2014, she returned to the series, along with Geszti, Szikora, Alföldi, and new judge Little G Weevil (Gábor Szűcs). In 2015, she moved on to participate in the RTL Klub and TV2 based show Sztárban sztár. She finished third overall. She returned to X-Faktor to mentor alongside Gáspár Laci, Péter Puskás, and ByeAlex.

In 2016, it was announced that Tóth would participate again in A Dal, this time in the 2017 edition with the song Hosszú idők, along with Freddie Shuman and Begi Lotfi. She progressed to the finals.

== Discography ==
=== Albums ===
Year	Album	Top ranking	Certifications
Year	Album	MAHASZ Top 40	Certifications
2005	Fekete Virág: 1. studio album	27	
2010	Elég volt!: 2. studio album	24	

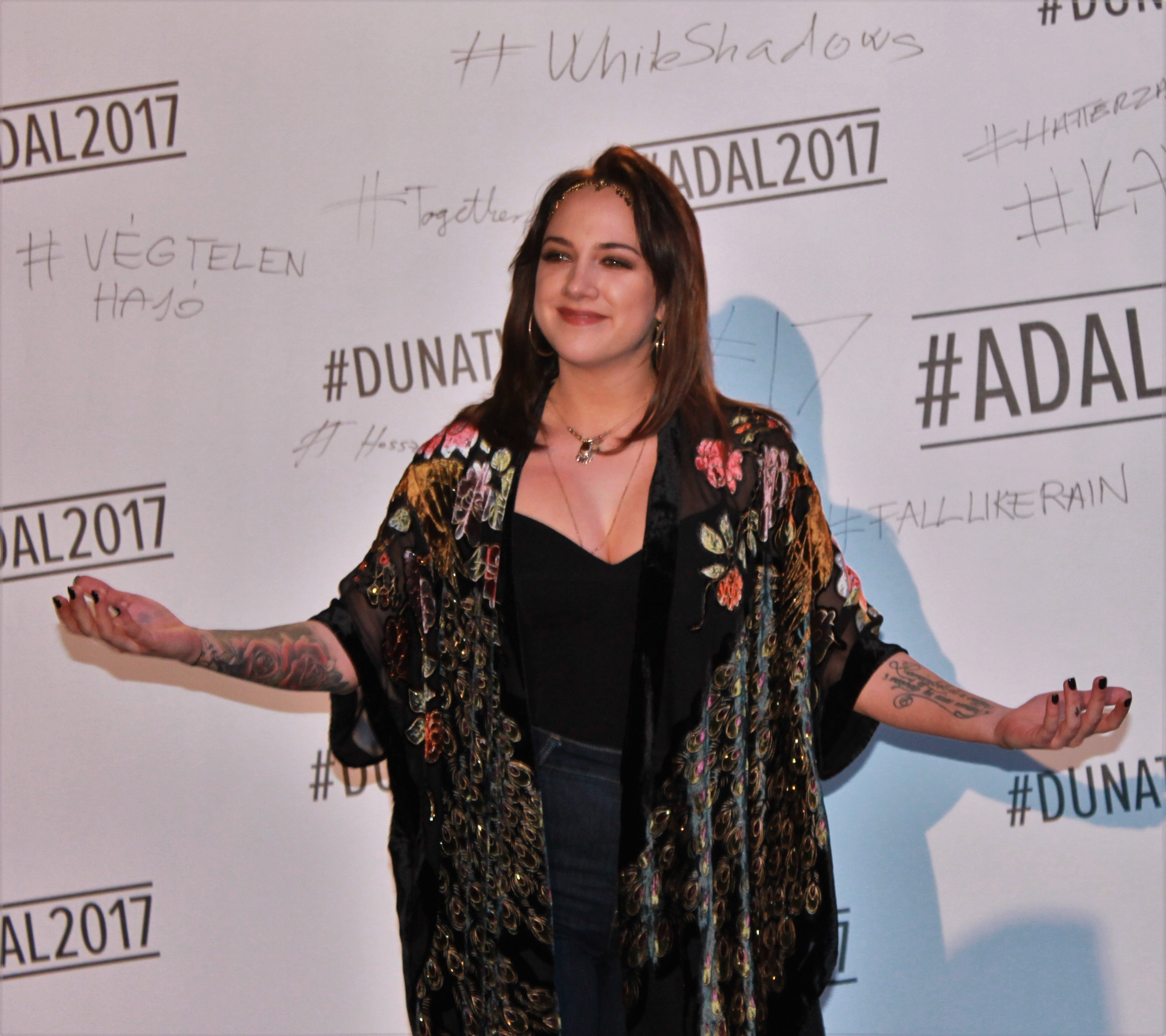
Gabi Tóth in 2016

=== Video clips ===
- 2005 – Fekete Virág
- 2006 – Vágyom rád
- 2007 – Szívemet adnám
- 2007 – Élünk ahogy bárki (A Stáb)
- 2008 – Érte megérte
- 2008 – Kell még valami (A Stáb)
- 2009 – Tiszta fejjel (Tiszta Fejjel Projekt)
- 2009 – Valami Amerika Még feat. Csipa
- 2009 – Salalla
- 2009 – Mi a szívemen, a számon vs. AFC Tomi
- 2010 – Elég volt!
- 2011 – Jöjj még
- 2012 – Nem kell végszó
- 2012 – Hív az élet
- 2013 – Éjjel-nappal Budapest
- 2013 – Sors
- 2016 – Ez vagyok én
- 2016 – Hosszú idők

== Honors and awards ==
- 2006 – Fonogram díj - Az év hazai felfedezettje (jelölés)
- 2008 – VIVA Comet - Legjobb videoklip (Stáb-Élünk, ahogy bárki) (jelölés)
- 2009 – Fonogram díj - Az év hazai dala (Szívemet adnám) (jelölés)
- 2009 – Glamour Women of the Year - Az év énekesnője (jelölés)
- 2009 – VIVA Comet - Legjobb női előadó (jelölés)
- 2009 – BRAVO OTTO - A legjobb magyar női előadó (jelölés)
- 2009 – BRAVO OTTO - Cool TV Különdíj (díjazott)
- 2010 – Glamour Women of the Year - Az év énekesnője (jelölés)
- 2010 – BRAVO OTTO - Az év magyar női előadója (díjazott)
- 2010 – BRAVO OTTO - Az év magyar videoklipje (Mi a szívemen, a számon) (jelölés)
- 2011 – Glamour Women of the Year - Az év énekesnője (díjazott)
- 2011 – BRAVO OTTO -Az év magyar női előadója (jelölés)
- 2011– BRAVO OTTO -Az év magyar videoklipje (Elég volt!) (jelölés)
- 2011 – VIVA Comet - Legjobb női előadó (jelölés)
- 2011 – VIVA Comet -Legjobb videoklip (Elég volt!) (díjazott)
- 2012 – Story Ötcsillag-díj - Az év legjobb énekese (díjazott)
- 2012 – BRAVO OTTO - Az év legjobb női előadója (díjazott)
- 2012 – VIVA Comet - Legjobb női előadó (díjazott)
- 2013 – BRAVO OTTO - Az év magyar női előadója (jelölés)
- 2014 – BRAVO OTTO - Az év magyar női előadója (jelölés)
- 2014 – VIVA Comet - Legjobb női előadó (jelölés)
- 2016 – Comet - Legjobb női előadó (jelölés)
- 2016 – Comet - Legjobb dal (Ez vagyok én) (jelölés)

== Personal life ==
Since 2017 her partner is Hungarian chef Gábor Krausz. Since they got married in 2020, Gabi's changed her surname to Krausz-Tóth. On 3 December 2019 was born their first daughter, named Hannaróza Mária Krausz.

On 9 August 2023, their marriage has been over and they are going to be divorced soon.

Her current partner is Hungarian dancer Máté Bence Papp, with whom she performed live on TV on 5 November 2023.

== See also ==
- Megasztár
- Vera Tóth
