= List of number-one singles of the 2010s (Hungary) =

This is a list of the songs that have reached number one on the Mahasz Rádiós Top 40 airplay chart during the 2010s. The issue date is the date the song began its run at number one.

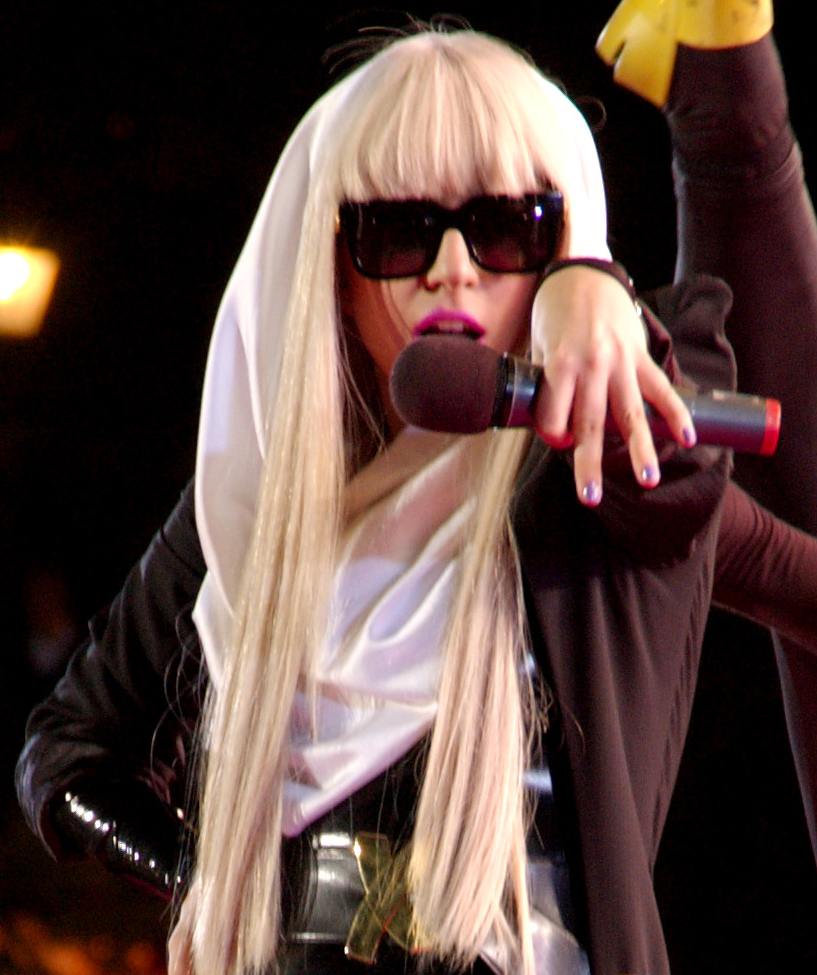
"Bad Romance", Lady Gaga's first single off her second studio album The Fame Monster was the most played song in the Hungarian radios for five weeks, while "Alejandro topped the chart for eight weeks.

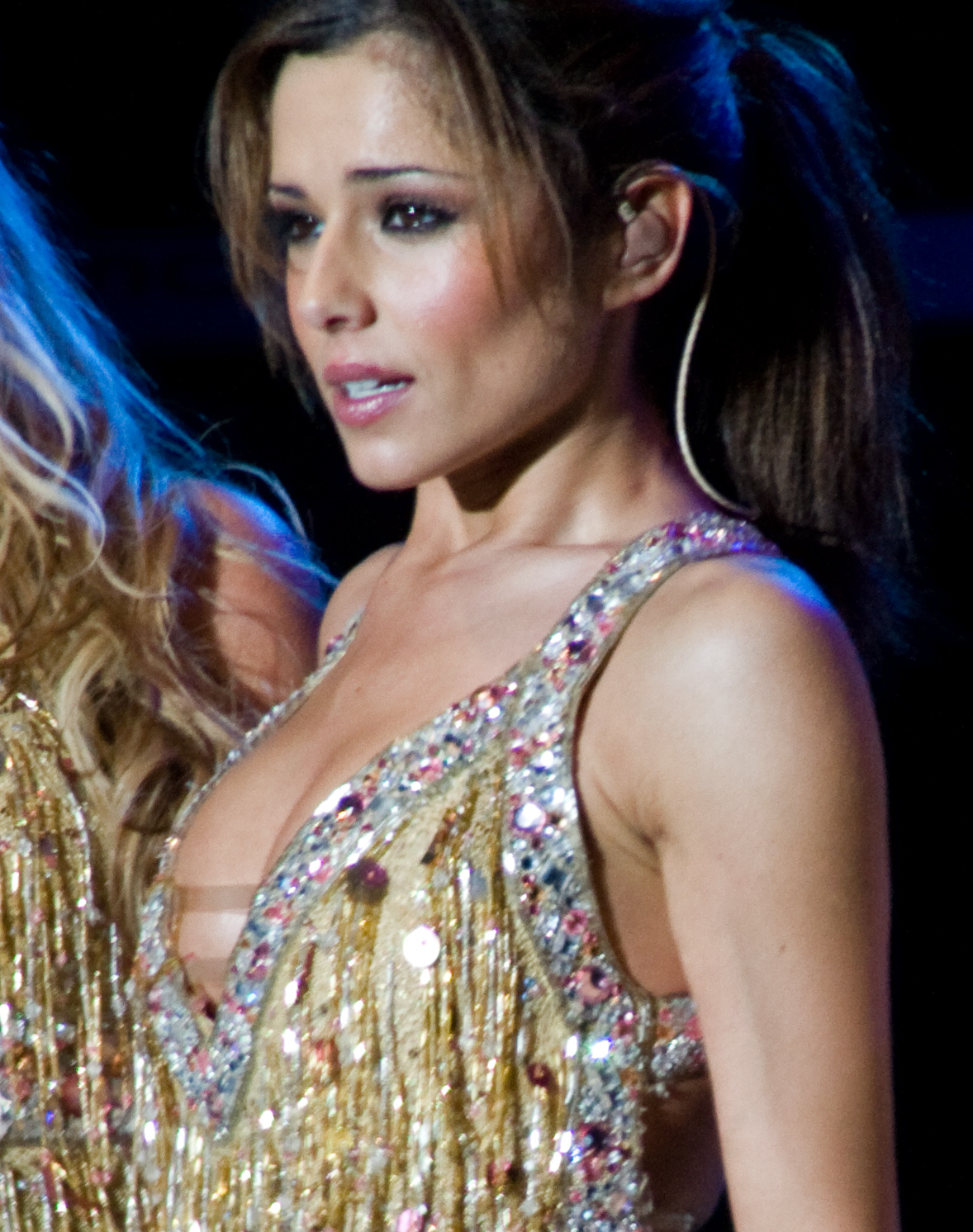
Cheryl Cole's "Fight for This Love" was at number one for 14 weeks.

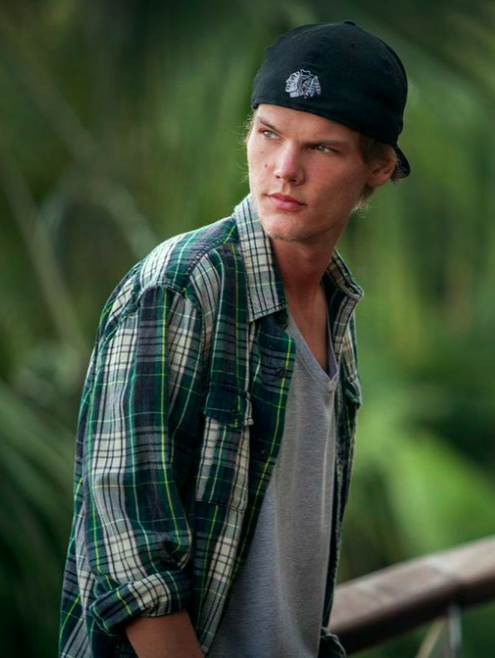
Avicii scored 9 number ones this decade, the most among all artists.

| Issue date | Song | Artist(s) | Weeks at number one |
2010
| 4 January | "Bodies" | Robbie Williams | 2 |
| 18 January | "Celebration" | Madonna | 1 |
| 25 January | "Hush Hush" | Pussycat Dolls | 1 |
| 1 February | "Bodies" | Robbie Williams | 1 |
| 8 February | "Bad Romance" | Lady Gaga | 5 |
| 15 March | "Fight for This Love" | Cheryl Cole | 11 |
| 31 May | "Hey, Soul Sister" | Train | 1 |
| 7 June | "Fight for This Love" | Cheryl Cole | 3 |
| 28 June | "Waka Waka (This Time for Africa)" | Shakira featuring Freshlyground | 2 |
| 12 July | "Lehet zöld az ég" | Viktor Varga | 1 |
| 19 July | "Illúzió" | Hooligans | 1 |
| 26 July | "Hey, Soul Sister" | Train | 2 |
| 9 August | "California Gurls" | Katy Perry | 4 |
| 6 September | "Monday Morning" | Melanie Fiona | 1 |
| 13 September | "Illúzió" | Hooligans | 1 |
| 20 September | "Alejandro" | Lady Gaga | 8 |
| 15 November | "Love the Way You Lie" | Eminem featuring Rihanna | 1 |
| 22 November | "Shame" | Robbie Williams & Gary Barlow | 1 |
| 29 November | "If I Had You" | Adam Lambert | 1 |
| 6 December | "Take It Off" | Kesha | 1 |
| 13 December | "If I Had You" | Adam Lambert | 1 |
| 20 December | "Only Girl (In the World)" | Rihanna | 1 |
| 27 December | "Raise Your Glass" | Pink | 6 |
2011
| 7 February | "A főnököm" | Magna Cum Laude | 1 |
| 14 February | "Solo" | Viktor Király | 1 |
| 21 February | "What's My Name?" | Rihanna | 3 |
| 14 March | "Born This Way" | Lady Gaga | 5 |
| 18 April | "Price Tag" | Jessie J featuring B.o.B. | 1 |
| 25 April | "What About My Dreams?" | Kati Wolf | 1 |
| 2 May | "Price Tag" | Jessie J featuring B.o.B. | 1 |
| 9 May | "What About My Dreams?" | Kati Wolf | 2 |
| 23 May | "Price Tag" | Jessie J featuring B.o.B. | 1 |
| 30 May | "What About My Dreams?" | Kati Wolf | 1 |
| 6 June | "The Lazy Song" | Bruno Mars | 1 |
| 13 June | "Mr. Saxobeat" | Alexandra Stan | 1 |
| 20 June | "The Lazy Song" | Bruno Mars | 1 |
| 27 June | "Mr. Saxobeat" | Alexandra Stan | 2 |
| 11 July | "S&M" | Rihanna | 1 |
| 18 July | "Party Rock Anthem" | LMFAO featuring Lauren Bennett & GoonRock | 4 |
| 15 August | "Give Me Everything" | Pitbull featuring Ne-Yo, Afrojack & Nayer | 3 |
| 5 September | "Party Rock Anthem" | LMFAO featuring Lauren Bennett & GoonRock | 1 |
| 12 September | "Moves Like Jagger" | Maroon 5 featuring Christina Aguilera | 18 |
2012
| 16 January | "We Found Love" | Rihanna featuring Calvin Harris | 1 |
| 23 January | "Moves Like Jagger" | Maroon 5 featuring Christina Aguilera | 2 |
| 6 February | "Levels" | Avicii | 2 |
| 20 February | "Give Me All Your Luvin'" | Madonna featuring Nicki Minaj & M.I.A. | 6 |
| 2 April | "Wild Ones" | Flo Rida featuring Sia | 3 |
| 23 April | "Somebody That I Used to Know" | Gotye featuring Kimbra | 1 |
| 30 April | "Drive By" | Train | 3 |
| 21 May | "Call Me Maybe" | Carly Rae Jepsen | 1 |
| 28 May | "Drive By" | Train | 2 |
| 11 June | "Call Me Maybe" | Carly Rae Jepsen | 1 |
| 18 June | "Payphone" | Maroon 5 featuring Wiz Khalifa | 6 |
| 30 July | "Whistle" | Flo Rida | 2 |
| 13 August | "Euphoria" | Loreen | 2 |
| 27 August | "Blow Me (One Last Kiss)" | Pink | 1 |
| 3 September | "Learning to Let Go" | Gábor Heincz | 1 |
| 10 September | "Somebody That I Used to Know" | Gotye featuring Kimbra | 1 |
| 17 September | "This Is Love" | will.i.am featuring Eva Simons | 1 |
| 24 September | "Never Played the Bass" | Nabiha | 1 |
| 1 October | "Spectrum (Say My Name)" | Florence and the Machine | 3 |
| 22 October | "We'll Be Coming Back" | Calvin Harris featuring Example | 1 |
| 29 October | "Never Played the Bass" | Nabiha | 2 |
| 12 November | "Skyfall" | Adele | 1 |
| 19 November | "Never Played the Bass" | Nabiha | 1 |
| 26 November | "Vadonatúj érzés" / "Daydream" | Gigi Radics | 9 |
2013
| 28 January | "Turn Around" | Conor Maynard featuring Ne-Yo | 3 |
| 18 February | "Locked Out of Heaven" | Bruno Mars | 4 |
| 18 March | "One Day / Reckoning Song (Wankelmut Rmx)" | Asaf Avidan | 1 |
| 25 March | "Locked Out of Heaven" | Bruno Mars | 1 |
| 1 April | "My Baby" | Kállay Saunders | 1 |
| 8 April | "Kedvesem" | ByeAlex | 2 |
| 22 April | "I Could Be the One (Nicktim)" | Avicii vs. Nicky Romero | 1 |
| 29 April | "Kedvesem" | ByeAlex | 1 |
| 6 May | "Get Lucky" | Daft Punk featuring Pharrell Williams | 8 |
| 1 July | "Blurred Lines" | Robin Thicke featuring T.I. & Pharrell | 4 |
| 29 July | "Wake Me Up" | Avicii featuring Aloe Blacc | 2 |
| 12 August | "Fire" | Viktor Király | 1 |
| 19 August | "Wake Me Up" | Avicii featuring Aloe Blacc | 3 |
| 9 September | "Blurred Lines" | Robin Thicke featuring T.I. & Pharrell | 1 |
| 16 September | "Applause" | Lady Gaga | 1 |
| 23 September | "Mire vársz" | Gigi Radics | 1 |
| 30 September | "Burn" | Ellie Goulding | 3 |
| 21 October | "My Love" | Newik | 1 |
| 28 October | "Burn" | Ellie Goulding | 1 |
| 4 November | "My Love" | Newik | 4 |
| 2 December | "Burn" | Ellie Goulding | 1 |
| 9 December | "Hey Brother" | Avicii | 2 |
| 23 December | "My Love" | Newik | 1 |
| 30 December | "Hey Brother" | Avicii | 2 |
2014
| 13 January | "Happy" | Pharrell Williams | 1 |
| 20 January | "Timber" | Pitbull featuring Ke$ha | 1 |
| 27 January | "Happy" | Pharrell Williams | 8 |
| 24 March | "We All" | Bogi | 1 |
| 31 March | "Addicted to You" | Avicii | 1 |
| 7 April | "Waves" | Mr. Probz | 6 |
| 19 May | "Rather Be" | Clean Bandit featuring Jess Glynne | 2 |
| 2 June | "Waves" | Mr. Probz | 2 |
| 16 June | "Nélküled" | Magdolna Rúzsa | 2 |
| 30 June | "She Moves (Far Away)" | Alle Farben featuring Graham Candy | 2 |
| 14 July | "Rather Be" | Clean Bandit featuring Jess Glynne | 1 |
| 21 July | "She Moves (Far Away)" | Alle Farben featuring Graham Candy | 1 |
| 28 July | "Prayer in C" | Lilly Wood & The Prick and Robin Schulz | 7 |
| 15 September | "The Chamber" | Lenny Kravitz | 1 |
| 22 September | "Prayer in C" | Lilly Wood & The Prick and Robin Schulz | 5 |
| 27 October | "The Days" | Avicii | 2 |
| 10 November | "Lovers on the Sun" | David Guetta featuring Sam Martin | 1 |
| 17 November | "Igazán" | Ákos | 1 |
| 24 November | "The Days" | Avicii | 4 |
| 22 December | "Blame" | Calvin Harris featuring John Newman | 1 |
2015
| 29 December | "The Days" | Avicii | 4 |
| 26 January | "Back Home" | Fritz Kalkbrenner | 1 |
| 2 February | "Uptown Funk" | Mark Ronson featuring Bruno Mars | 9 |
| 6 April | "Fade Out Lines" | The Avener | 2 |
| 20 April | "Uptown Funk" | Mark Ronson featuring Bruno Mars | 1 |
| 27 April | "Cheerleader" | OMI | 1 |
| 4 May | "Firestone" | Kygo featuring Conrad Sewell | 1 |
| 11 May | "Walk" | Kwabs | 1 |
| 18 May | "Firestone" | Kygo featuring Conrad Sewell | 2 |
| 1 June | "Don't Worry" | Madcon featuring Ray Dalton | 1 |
| 8 June | "Emlékszem, Sopronban (A Volt Fesztivál Himnusza)" | Wellhello x Halott Pénz | 1 |
| 15 June | "Cheerleader" | OMI | 1 |
| 22 June | "Don't Worry" | Madcon featuring Ray Dalton | 1 |
| 29 June | "Ain't Nobody (Loves Me Better)" | Felix Jaehn featuring Jasmine Thompson | 1 |
| 6 July | "Lean On" | Major Lazer and DJ Snake featuring MØ | 3 |
| 23 July | "Waiting for Love" | Avicii | 8 |
| 19 September | "Ain't Nobody (Loves Me Better)" | Felix Jaehn featuring Jasmine Thompson | 1 |
| 28 September | "Gyere és táncolj" | Wellhello | 2 |
| 12 October | "Reality" | Lost Frequencies featuring Janieck Devy | 2 |
| 26 October | "For a Better Day" | Avicii | 1 |
| 2 November | "Reality" | Lost Frequencies featuring Janieck Devy | 1 |
| 9 November | "For a Better Day" | Avicii | 1 |
| 16 November | "Reality" | Lost Frequencies featuring Janieck Devy | 1 |
| 23 November | "For a Better Day" | Avicii | 1 |
| 30 November | "Hello" | Adele | 2 |
| 14 December | "Here for You" | Kygo featuring Ella Henderson | 1 |
| 21 December | "Hello" | Adele | 3 |
2016
| 11 January | "Darabokra törted a szívem" | Halott Pénz | 2 |
| 25 January | "Még mindig..." | ByeAlex és a Slepp / Lotfi Begi | 1 |
| 1 February | "Fast Car" | Jonas Blue featuring Dakota | 2 |
| 15 February | "Sax" | Fleur East | 1 |
| 22 February | "Egy szó miatt" | Begi Lotfi featuring Misi Mező | 1 |
| 29 February | "Fast Car" | Jonas Blue featuring Dakota | 1 |
| 7 March | "Egy szó miatt" | Begi Lotfi featuring Misi Mező | 1 |
| 14 March | "Sax" | Fleur East | 1 |
| 21 March | "Egy szó miatt" | Begi Lotfi featuring Misi Mező | 2 |
| 4 April | "Stay" | Kygo featuring Maty Noyes | 1 |
| 11 April | "Broken Arrows" | Avicii | 2 |
| 25 April | "Cheap Thrills" | Sia featuring Sean Paul | 3 |
| 16 May | "Can't Stop the Feeling!" | Justin Timberlake | 1 |
| 23 May | "Cheap Thrills" | Sia featuring Sean Paul | 1 |
| 30 May | "This Is What You Came For" | Calvin Harris featuring Rihanna | 1 |
| 6 June | "Can't Stop the Feeling!" | Justin Timberlake | 2 |
| 20 June | "This Girl" | Kungs vs. Cookin' on 3 Burners | 1 |
| 27 June | "Can't Stop the Feeling!" | Justin Timberlake | 3 |
| 18 July | "This Girl" | Kungs vs. Cookin' on 3 Burners | 1 |
| 25 July | "Can't Stop the Feeling!" | Justin Timberlake | 2 |
| 8 August | "This Girl" | Kungs vs. Cookin' on 3 Burners | 1 |
| 15 August | "Balatoni nyár" | Pixa & Stereo Palma featuring Wellhello | 2 |
| 29 August | "Cry" | Sigma | 1 |
| 5 September | "Duele el Corazón" | Enrique Iglesias featuring Wisin | 1 |
| 12 September | "Élnünk kellett volna" | Halott Pénz feat. Agebeat & Kovary | 1 |
| 19 September | "Duele el Corazón" | Enrique Iglesias featuring Wisin | 3 |
| 10 October | "My Way" | Calvin Harris | 1 |
| 17 October | "The Greatest" | Sia featuring Kendrick Lamar | 1 |
| 24 October | "My Way" | Calvin Harris | 3 |
| 14 November | "The Greatest" | Sia featuring Kendrick Lamar | 1 |
| 21 November | "My Way" | Calvin Harris | 2 |
| 5 December | "Human" | Rag'n'Bone Man | 8 |
2017
| 27 January | "Shape of You" | Ed Sheeran | 10 |
| 7 April | "Chained to the Rhythm" | Katy Perry featuring Skip Marley | 3 |
| 28 April | "Shape of You" | Ed Sheeran | 4 |
| 26 May | "Despacito" | Luis Fonsi featuring Daddy Yankee | 3 |
| 16 June | "Shape of You" | Ed Sheeran | 1 |
| 23 June | "Despacito" | Luis Fonsi featuring Daddy Yankee | 5 |
| 28 July | "OK" | Robin Schulz featuring James Blunt | 2 |
| 11 August | "Despacito" | Luis Fonsi featuring Daddy Yankee | 1 |
| 18 August | "OK" | Robin Schulz featuring James Blunt | 3 |
| 8 September | "More Than You Know" | Axwell and Ingrosso | 3 |
| 29 September | "OK" | Robin Schulz featuring James Blunt | 1 |
| 6 October | "More Than You Know" | Axwell and Ingrosso | 6 |
| 17 November | "New Rules" | Dua Lipa | 2 |
| 1 December | "Wild Thoughts" | DJ Khaled featuring Rihanna & Bryson Tiller | 2 |
| 15 December | "Havana" | Camila Cabello featuring Young Thug | 8 |
2018
| 9 February | "What Lovers Do" | Maroon 5 featuring SZA | 1 |
| 16 February | "Havana" | Camila Cabello featuring Young Thug | 1 |
| 23 February | "Wolves" | Selena Gomez & Marshmello | 2 |
| 9 March | "OK" | Robin Schulz featuring James Blunt | 4 |
| 6 April | "Havana" | Camila Cabello featuring Young Thug | 2 |
| 20 April | "Crazy" | Lost Frequencies and Zonderling | 4 |
| 18 May | "Breathe" | Jax Jones featuring Ina Wroldsen | 3 |
| 8 June | "Flames" | David Guetta & Sia | 2 |
| 22 June | "One Kiss" | Calvin Harris & Dua Lipa | 5 |
| 27 July | "Unforgettable" | Robin Schulz featuring Marc Scibilia | 2 |
| 10 August | "Melody" | Lost Frequencies featuring James Blunt | 6 |
| 21 September | "Solo" | Clean Bandit featuring Demi Lovato | 6 |
| 2 November | "In My Mind" | Dynoro and Gigi D'Agostino | 3 |
| 23 November | "Promises" | Calvin Harris & Sam Smith | 2 |
| 7 December | "Solo" | Clean Bandit featuring Demi Lovato | 2 |
| 21 December | "In My Mind" | Dynoro and Gigi D'Agostino | 2 |
2019
| 4 January | "Promises" | Calvin Harris & Sam Smith | 2 |
| 18 January | "Remedy" | Alesso | 2 |
| 1 February | "Sweet but Psycho" | Ava Max | 18 |
| 7 June | "Body" | Loud Luxury featuring Brando | 1 |
| 14 June | "Sweet but Psycho" | Ava Max | 1 |
| 21 June | "Fading" | Alle Farben & Ilira | 3 |
| 12 July | "Body" | Loud Luxury featuring Brando | 1 |
| 19 July | "Giant" | Calvin Harris & Rag'n'Bone Man | 1 |
| 26 July | "Body" | Loud Luxury featuring Brando | 5 |
| 30 August | "Señorita" | Shawn Mendes & Camila Cabello | 7 |
| 18 October | "Don't Call Me Up" | Mabel | 1 |
| 25 October | "Bad Guy" | Billie Eilish | 3 |
| 15 November | "Dance Monkey" | Tones and I | 1 |
| 22 November | "Bad Guy" | Billie Eilish | 2 |
| 6 December | "Dance Monkey" | Tones and I | 9 |
