= Hungary in the Eurovision Song Contest 2013 =

- Eurovision Song Contest 2013
- Country: Hungary
- Selection process: A Dal 2013
- Selection date: 2 March 2013

Competing entry
- Song: "Kedvesem"
- Artist: ByeAlex
- Songwriters: Alex Márta; Zoltán Palásti Kovács

Placement
- Semi-final result: Qualified (8th, 66 points)
- Final result: 10th, 84 points

Participation chronology

Hungary was represented at the Eurovision Song Contest 2013 in Malmö, Sweden. The Hungarian entry was selected through a national selection format titled again A Dal (which means "The Song"), consisting of three heats, two semi-finals and a final, organised by the Hungarian broadcaster MTVA. ByeAlex represented Hungary with the song "Kedvesem", which qualified from the second semi-final of the competition and finished in 10th place in the final, scoring 84 points.

== Before Eurovision ==
=== A Dal 2013 ===
A Dal 2013 was the second edition of A Dal which selected the Hungarian entry for the Eurovision Song Contest 2013. Thirty entries competed in the competition that consisted of six shows which commenced on 2 February 2013 and concluded with an eight-song final on 2 March 2013. All shows in the competition were broadcast on m1 and Duna TV World.

==== Format ====
The format of the competition consisted of six shows: three heats, two semi-finals and a final. The six shows took place at MTVA studios in Budapest and were hosted by Gábor Gundel-Takács and Éva Novodomszky, with Márton Buda conducting backstage interviews. The three heats, held on 2 February 2013, 9 February 2013 and 16 February 2013, each featured ten entries with six advancing to the semi-finals from each show. The semi-finals, held on 23 and 24 February 2013 during A Dal-hétvége (A Dal-weekend), each featured nine entries with four advancing to the final from each show. The final, held on 2 March 2013, selected the Hungarian entry for Malmö from the eight remaining entries.

==== Voting ====
Results during each show were determined by each member of the five-member judging panel and votes from the public. During the heats and the semi-finals, two rounds of voting determined which entries advanced to the next stages of the competition. In the first round of voting, each judge assigned scores to each entry ranging from 1 (lowest score) to 10 (highest score) immediately after the artist(s) conclude their performance. The summation of the judges scores determined the final scores for the first round. In the heats, the top three entries with the highest scores advanced to the semi-finals. In the semi-finals, the top two entries with the highest scores advanced to the final in the first round of voting. In the case of a tie among the entries in the first round of voting, the judging panel would deliberate and determine which entries would advance. In the second round of voting, the remaining entries that did not qualify during the first round faced a public vote via submitting an SMS. The three entries that received the most votes from each heat would also advance to the semi-finals, while the two entries that received the most votes from each semi-final would also advance to the final. In the case of a tie during the second round of voting, the entry which received a higher score during the first round of voting would advance and should a tie still persist, the judging panel would deliberate and determine which entry advanced.

In the final, the eight remaining entries also faced two rounds of voting. In the first round, the judges assigned points to their four preferred entries: 4 (lowest), 6, 8 and 10 (highest). The top four entries determined by the judges qualified to the second round of voting. In the second round, a public vote exclusively determined the winning entry.

==== Judges ====
The members of the judging panel were announced on 4 January 2013. The judging panel participated in each show by providing feedback to the competing artists and selecting entries to advance in the competition. The panel consisted of:

- Viktor Rakonczai – Composer and member of V.I.P. who represented Hungary in the Eurovision Song Contest 1997
- Csaba Walkó – Member of Compact Disco who represented Hungary in Baku in 2012 with "Sound Of Our Hearts"
- Magdi Rúzsa – Singer who represented Hungary in 2007 in Helsinki with "Unsubstantial Blues"
- Philip Rákay – Programme director
- Jenő Csiszár – Radio anchor

==== Competing entries ====
Artists and composers were able to submit their applications and entries for the competition between 24 October 2012 and 31 December 2012. Competing artists were required to either hold Hungarian citizenship or be able to speak Hungarian fluently. Artists were permitted to collaborate with international composers and submit songs in English, however, in such cases a translation of the lyrics to Hungarian were required. After the submission deadline had passed, 244 entries were received by the broadcaster. A five-member preselection jury selected thirty entries for the competition. The competing entries were announced during a press conference on 10 January 2013. Among the competing artists was former Eurovision Song Contest entrant Gergő Rácz, who represented Hungary in the 1997 Contest as a member of V.I.P..

The songs "Ha virág lennék" and "Anyáddal", written by Edina Mókus Szirtes and Balázs Horváth respectively, and to have been performed by Edina Mókus Szirtes and The Hated Tomorrow respectively, were disqualified on 11 January 2013 as the songs were presented before 1 September 2012, breaching the rules of the competition. "Hullócsillag" by Mónika Hoffman and "Ne engedj el" by Odett were announced as the replacements. The song "Katatón dal", written by Jenő Bartalos and to have been performed by Egy Másik Zenekar was disqualified on 14 January 2013 as the song was also presented before 1 September 2012. "Élj pont úgy" by Laura Cserpes was announced as the replacement.

Artist	Song	Songwriter(s)
Szilvia Agárdi and Dénes Pál	"Szíveddel láss"	Zé Szabó, Tamás Molnár
Background	"Neonzöld"	Gábor Berkó
Gergő Baricz	"Húz"	Gergő Baricz
Bogi	"Tükörkép"	Ádám Kovacsics, Adrienn Bata "Barbee"
Bence Brasch	"Túl egyszerű"	Krisztián Szakos, Krisztián Éder
Krisztián Burai	"Született szívtörő"	Krisztián Burai, Balázs Megyeri, András Kállay-Saunders
ByeAlex	"Kedvesem"	Alex Márta, Zoltán Palásti Kovács "Zoohacker"
Laura Cserpes	"Élj pont úgy"	Tamás Kolozsvári, Péter Krajczár, István Tabár
Egy Másik Zenekar	"Katatón dal"	Jenő Bartalos
Gyula Éliás	"Mindhalálig várni rád"	Gyula Éliás, Norbert Kardos, Péter Geszti
Zoltán Fehér	"Nincs baj"	Zoltán Fehér, Krisztián Burai, Péter Geszti
Flash Travel	"Soha ne add fel"	András Szabó, Péter Újvári, Viktor László, Elemér Szabó, Tamás Simó
Tibor Gyurcsík	"Örök harc"	Márton Vödrös, Tamás Molnár, Péter Geszti
The Hated Tomorrow	"Anyáddal"	Balázs Horváth
Mónika Hoffman	"Hullócsillag"	Mónika Hoffman, Jonas Gladnikoff, Primož Poglajen, Michael James Down, Péter Puskás
Veca Janicsák	"Új generáció"	Veronika Janicsák
András Kállay-Saunders	"My Baby"	András Kállay-Saunders, Krisztián Burai, Ernő Bodóczki, Leslie Tay, John Alexis
Ildikó Keresztes	"Nem akarok többé játszani"	Leander Köteles
Fatima Mohamed	"Nem baj"	Tibor Fehér, Laci Nagy
Mrs. Columbo	"Játszd újra!"	Dorina Galambos, Zsófi Hudák, Fanni Sárközy, Norbert Kovács, András István Fecske
Odett	"Ne engedj el"	Gergő Kovács, Zoltán Takács, Kamilla Fátyol, Odett Polgár
Tamás Palcsó	"Ezt látnod kell"	István Tabár, Tamás Palcsó, István Tabár
Plastikhead feat. Laci Gáspár	"A szeretet él"	László Gáspár, Zoltán Tóth, Tamás Orbán
Lilla Polyák	"Valami más"	Máté Bella, Vajk Szente, Attila Galambos
Péter Puskás	"Amíg a tűz ég"	László Diaz Csöndör, Düki, Péter Puskás
Gergő Rácz	"Csak állj mellém"	Gergő Rácz, Péter Geszti
Gigi Radics	"Úgy fáj"	Huba Kelemen, Jack D. Elliot, Jánosi
Rami	"Puzzle"	Tamás Kálmán, Judit Ramóna Hideg
Ádám Szabó	"Hadd legyen más"	Ádám Szabó, Levente Molnár, Ágnes Szabó
Edina Mókus Szirtes	"Ha virág lennék"	Edina Mókus Szirtes
United	"Tegnap még más voltál"	Áron Romhányi, Barna Pély, Gergő Mits
Tamás Vastag	"Holnaptól"	Zé Szabó, Vajk Szente
Gabi Völgyesi	"Csak te légy"	Ádám Kovacsics, Eszter Major

==== Shows ====
===== Heats =====
Three heats took place on 2, 9 and 16 February 2013. In each heat ten entries competed and six entries qualified to the semi-finals after two rounds of voting. In the first round of voting, three qualifiers were determined by the combination of scores from each judge. In the second round of voting, the remaining seven entries that were not in the initial top three faced a public vote consisting of votes submitted through SMS in order to determine three additional qualifiers.

Jury qualifier Public voting qualifier

Heat 1 – 2 February 2013
R/O	Artist	Song	V. Rakonczai	C. Walkó	M. Rúzsa	P. Rákay	J. Csiszár	Jury Total	Result
1	Zoltán Fehér	"Nincs baj"	7	7	7	8	8	37	—N/a
2	Mrs. Columbo	"Játszd újra!"	7	8	8	8	7	38	—N/a
3	Gergő Baricz	"Húz"	8	9	9	8	9	43	Advanced
4	Bogi	"Tükörkép"	7	7	7	8	8	37	—N/a
5	Tamás Palcsó	"Ezt látnod kell"	7	7	7	7	7	35	Advanced
6	Background	"Neonzöld"	7	7	7	7	7	35	—N/a
7	Tibor Gyurcsík	"Örök harc"	9	8	8	8	8	41	Advanced
8	Ildikó Keresztes	"Nem akarok többé játszani"	9	10	10	9	9	47	Advanced
9	Gergő Rácz	"Csak állj mellém"	9	10	9	9	8	45	Advanced
10	Szilvia Agárdi and Dénes Pál	"Szíveddel láss"	9	10	10	10	9	48	Advanced

Heat 2 – 9 February 2013
R/O	Artist	Song	V. Rakonczai	C. Walkó	M. Rúzsa	P. Rákay	J. Csiszár	Jury Total	Result
1	Plastikhead feat. Laci Gáspár	"A szeretet él"	8	8	9	10	9	44	Advanced
2	Odett	"Ne engedj el"	9	8	10	8	8	43	Advanced
3	Ádám Szabó	"Hadd legyen más"	7	6	6	8	7	34	—N/a
4	Gabi Völgyesi	"Csak te légy"	8	7	10	9	8	42	—N/a
5	Gyula Éliás	"Mindhalálig várni rád"	9	8	10	7	8	42	—N/a
6	Rami	"Puzzle"	6	5	5	5	6	27	—N/a
7	Tamás Vastag	"Holnaptól"	9	8	9	9	8	43	Advanced
8	ByeAlex	"Kedvesem"	8	9	9	8	9	43	Advanced
9	Veca Janicsák	"Új generáció"	8	9	9	8	8	42	Advanced
10	András Kállay-Saunders	"My Baby"	9	10	10	10	9	48	Advanced

Heat 3 – 16 February 2013
R/O	Artist	Song	V. Rakonczai	C. Walkó	M. Rúzsa	P. Rákay	J. Csiszár	Jury Total	Result
1	Lilla Polyák	"Valami más"	9	9	9	8	8	43	Advanced
2	Krisztián Burai	"Született szívtörő"	7	7	7	8	7	36	—N/a
3	Mónika Hoffman	"Hullócsillag"	7	7	8	7	7	36	—N/a
4	United	"Tegnap még más voltál"	8	8	9	9	7	41	Advanced
5	Laura Cserpes	"Élj pont úgy"	9	9	10	10	7	45	Advanced
6	Flash Travel	"Soha ne add fel"	9	9	8	9	7	42	—N/a
7	Fatima Mohamed	"Nem baj"	7	8	8	6	8	37	Advanced
8	Bence Brasch	"Túl egyszerű"	8	7	7	9	6	37	—N/a
9	Gigi Radics	"Úgy fáj"	9	9	10	10	9	47	Advanced
10	Péter Puskás	"Amíg a tűz ég"	8	9	9	9	7	42	Advanced

===== Semi-finals =====
Two semi-finals took place on 23 and 24 February 2013. In each semi-final nine entries competed and four entries qualified to the final after two rounds of voting. In the first round of voting, two qualifiers were determined by the combination of scores from each judge. In the second round of voting, the remaining seven entries that were not in the initial top two faced a public vote consisting of votes submitted through SMS in order to determine two additional qualifiers.

Jury qualifier Public voting qualifier

Semi-final 1 – 23 February 2013
R/O	Artist	Song	V. Rakonczai	C. Walkó	M. Rúzsa	P. Rákay	J. Csiszár	Jury Total	Result
1	Péter Puskás	"Amíg a tűz ég"	7	6	6	9	6	34	—N/a
2	Laura Cserpes	"Élj pont úgy"	6	7	6	8	6	33	Advanced
3	Plastikhead feat. Laci Gáspár	"A szeretet él"	8	7	7	9	7	38	—N/a
4	Ildikó Keresztes	"Nem akarok többé játszani"	8	8	8	8	7	39	Advanced
5	Tibor Gyurcsík	"Örök harc"	8	7	7	7	6	35	—N/a
6	Odett	"Ne engedj el"	7	7	6	7	6	33	—N/a
7	András Kállay-Saunders	"My Baby"	9	9	9	9	9	45	Advanced
8	Lilla Polyák	"Valami más"	7	7	7	7	7	35	—N/a
9	Gergő Rácz	"Csak állj mellém"	9	9	8	9	8	43	Advanced

Semi-final 2 – 24 February 2013
R/O	Artist	Song	V. Rakonczai	C. Walkó	M. Rúzsa	P. Rákay	J. Csiszár	Jury Total	Result
1	United	"Tegnap még más voltál"	8	8	9	9	8	42	—N/a
2	Tamás Palcsó	"Ezt látnod kell"	7	6	6	7	6	32	—N/a
3	Fatima Mohamed	"Nem baj"	7	7	7	6	7	34	—N/a
4	Gergő Baricz	"Húz"	7	7	7	8	8	37	—N/a
5	Veca Janicsák	"Új generáció"	7	7	7	8	7	36	—N/a
6	ByeAlex	"Kedvesem"	8	8	7	7	7	37	Advanced
7	Szilvia Agárdi and Dénes Pál	"Szíveddel láss"	8	7	8	8	7	38	Advanced
8	Gigi Radics	"Úgy fáj"	9	8	9	8	8	42	Advanced
9	Tamás Vastag	"Holnaptól"	9	8	9	9	8	43	Advanced

===== Final =====
The final took place on 2 March 2013 where the eight entries that qualified from the semi-finals competed. The winner of the competition was selected over two rounds of voting. In the first round, the jury determined the top four entries that advanced to the second round. The voting system for the four jurors was different from the method used in the heats and semi-finals. Each juror announced their scores after all songs had been performed rather than assigning scores following each performance and the jurors ranked their preferred top four entries and assigned points in the following manner: 4 (lowest), 6, 8 and 10 (highest). In the second round, "Kedvesem" performed by ByeAlex was selected as the winner via a public vote consisting of votes submitted through SMS. More than 244,000 votes were registered in the second round.

Advanced to the second round Winner

Final – First Round – 2 March 2013
R/O	Artist	Song	V. Rakonczai	C. Walkó	M. Rúzsa	P. Rákay	J. Csiszár	Total	Place
1	Tamás Vastag	"Holnaptól"	6	4	0	6	6	22	3
2	Ildikó Keresztes	"Nem akarok többé játszani"	4	0	4	0	0	8	5
3	András Kállay-Saunders	"My Baby"	8	10	10	8	10	46	1
4	Gigi Radics	"Úgy fáj"	10	8	8	10	8	44	2
5	Gergő Rácz	"Csak állj mellém"	0	0	0	0	0	0	7
6	Szilvia Agárdi and Dénes Pál	"Szíveddel láss"	0	0	0	0	0	0	7
7	Laura Cserpes	"Élj pont úgy"	0	0	0	4	0	4	6
8	ByeAlex	"Kedvesem"	0	6	6	0	4	16	4

Final – Second Round – 2 March 2013
Artist	Song	Place
Tamás Vastag	"Holnaptól"	4
András Kállay-Saunders	"My Baby"	2
Gigi Radics	"Úgy fáj"	3
ByeAlex	"Kedvesem"	1

== At Eurovision ==
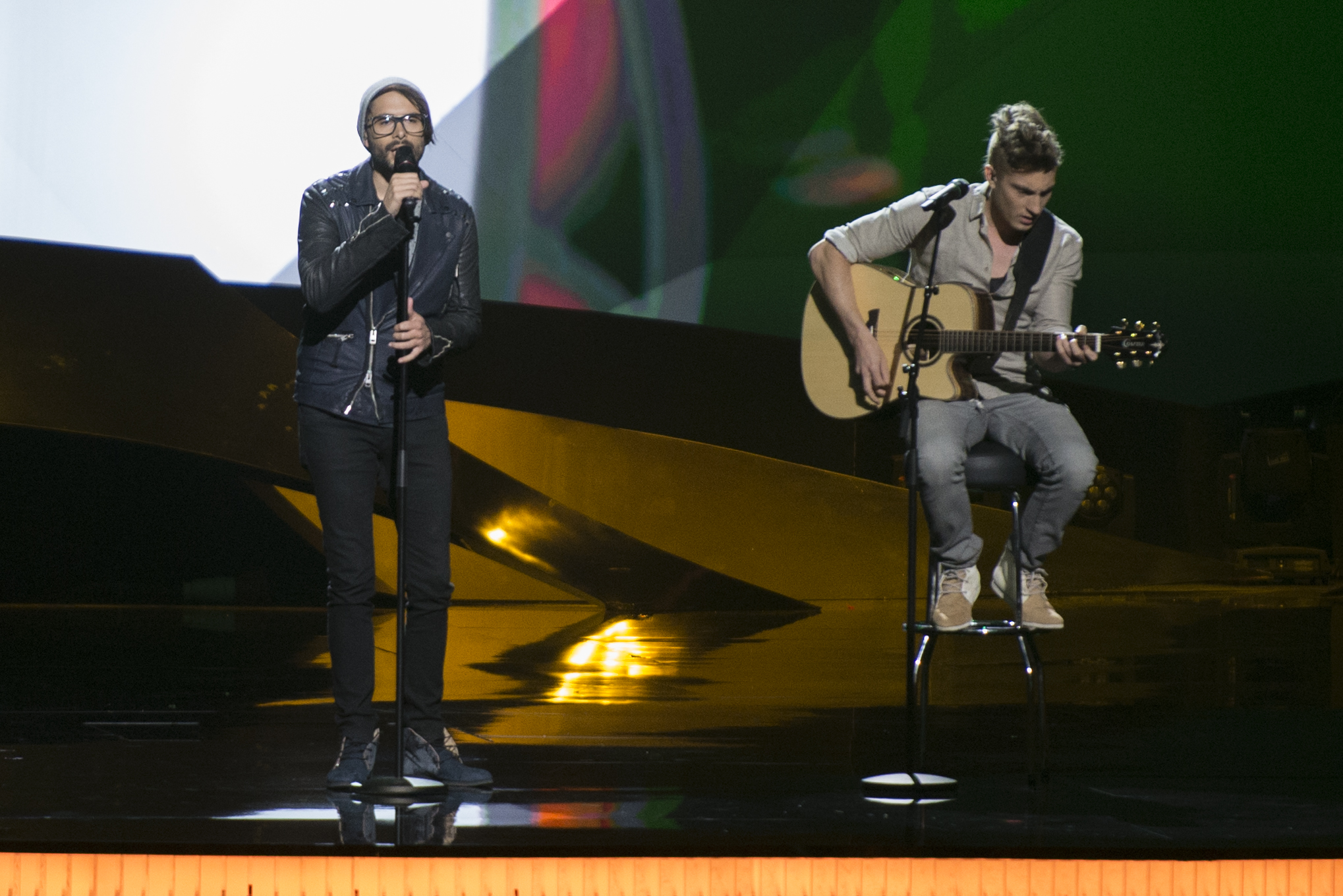
ByeAlex with Dániel Kővágó at the second semi-final dress rehearsal in Malmö.

Hungary was allocated to compete in the second semi-final on 16 May for a place in the final on 18 May. In the second semifinal, the producers of the show decided that Hungary would perform 12th, following Armenia and preceding Norway. On stage, ByeAlex was joined by backing vocalist Helga Wéber and guitarist Dániel Kővágó.

Hungary qualified from the second semi-final, placing 8th and scoring 66 points. At the second semi-final winners' press conference, Hungary was allocated to perform in the second half of the final. In the final, the producers of the show decided that Hungary would perform 17th, following Sweden and preceding Denmark. Hungary placed 10th in the final, scoring 84 points.

In Hungary, both the semi-finals and the final were broadcast on M1, with commentary provided by Gábor Gundel Takács.

The national jury that provided 50% of the Hungarian vote in the second semi-final and the final consisted of: Fecó Balázs, Erzsébet Jeney, Áron Kiss, Viktor Rakonczai, and Magdi Rúzsa. The Hungarian spokesperson in the grand final was Éva Novodomszky.

=== Voting ===
==== Points awarded to Hungary ====
Points awarded to Hungary (Semi-final 2)
Score	Country
12 points	Switzerland
10 points	Germany
8 points	Finland
7 points	Albania
6 points	Bulgaria; Romania
5 points	
4 points	San Marino
3 points	France; Georgia; Israel
2 points	Latvia; Norway
1 point	

Points awarded to Hungary (Final)
Score	Country
12 points	Germany
10 points	Finland; Switzerland
8 points	Albania
7 points	Netherlands
6 points	Bulgaria; San Marino
5 points	Lithuania
4 points	Croatia; Estonia
3 points	Italy; Sweden
2 points	Greece; Norway; Serbia
1 point	

==== Points awarded by Hungary ====
Points awarded by Hungary (Semi-final 2)
Score	Country
12 points	Azerbaijan
10 points	Iceland
8 points	Malta
7 points	Norway
6 points	Switzerland
5 points	Finland
4 points	Georgia
3 points	Greece
2 points	San Marino
1 point	Bulgaria

Points awarded by Hungary (Final)
Score	Country
12 points	Azerbaijan
10 points	Denmark
8 points	Malta
7 points	Ukraine
6 points	Iceland
5 points	Netherlands
4 points	Belgium
3 points	Armenia
2 points	Norway
1 point	Greece
