= The Voice of Hungary season 2 =

The second season of The Voice Magyarország (The Voice of Hungary) premiered on September 2, 2023, after the show was renamed and switched to RTL. The show was previously called The Voice – Magyarország hangja and was originally released in 2012. The reboot of the show in 2023 marked the longest ever hiatus between two seasons in the franchise.

== Coaches and Host ==
It was announced in early 2023 that Hungarian artists Curtis, Nóri Trokán, Manuel, and Erika Miklósa would be the four coaches for the second season. Meanwhile, Bence Istenes joined the show as the new host of this season.

== Teams ==
Coaches' teams
Coach	Top Artists				
Curtis	Dávid Dani János	Jaber Gábor	György Ádám Bakti	Krisztián Mata	Cinzia Conso
Nóri Trokán	Lilla Anna Kalocsa	Szonja Fóris	Viktória Doan	Nina Eszes	
Manuel	Rebeka Brigitta Deák	Harmat Kovács	Jázmin Beáta Haga	Sándor Toldi	
Erika Miklósa	Gábor Homoki	András Beck	Bence Szabó	Aliz Kovács	

Note: Italicized names are artists stolen from another team during the battles or the knockouts (names struck through within former teams).

== Blind auditions ==
The show began with the Blind Auditions on September 2, 2023. In each audition, an artist sings their piece in front of the coaches, whose chairs are facing the audience. If a coach is interested in working with the artist, they may press their button to face the artist. If a singular coach presses the button, the artist automatically becomes part of their team. If multiple coaches turn, they will compete for the artist, who will decide which team they will join. This season, the coaches have 14 spots each on their teams.

Blind auditions color key
✔	Coach pressed "I WANT YOU" button
	Artist joined this coach's team
	Artist was eliminated with no coach pressing their button
✘	Coach pressed "I WANT YOU" button, but was blocked by another coach from getting the artist
	Blocked by Curtis; Blocked by Nóri; Blocked by Manuel; Blocked by Erika

Blind Auditions Results
Episode	Order	Artist	Age	Hometown	Song	Coach's and artist's choices			
Episode	Order	Artist	Age	Hometown	Song	Curtis	Nóri	Manuel	Erika
Episode 1 (September 2)	1	Dávid Dani János	14	Budapest	"Szállj fel magasra"	✔	✔	✔	✔
Episode 1 (September 2)	2	Lilla Anna Kalocsa	22	Attala	"Old Town Road"	–	✔	–	✔
Episode 1 (September 2)	3	Liza Márkus	26	Budapest	"Something's Got a Hold On Me"	–	–	–	–
Episode 1 (September 2)	4	Gábor Homoki	33	Budapest	"Toxic"	✔	✔	✔	✔
Episode 1 (September 2)	5	Rebeka Brigitta Deák	24	Budapest	"Nem kell" (Original Song)	✔	✔	✔	✔
Episode 1 (September 2)	6	András Beck	35	Ajka	"I (Who Have Nothing)"	–	✔	–	✔
Episode 1 (September 2)	7	Harmat Kovács	17	Budapest	"No Time to Die"	✔	✔	✔	✔
Episode 1 (September 2)	8	Jaber Gábor	27	Budapest	"Moshpit" (Original Song)	✔	✔	✔	✔
Episode 1 (September 2)	9	Luca Gálos	20	Ászár	"Veled Minden"	–	–	–	–
Episode 1 (September 2)	10	Bence Szabó	18	N/A	"Reptér"	✔	✔	✔	✔
Episode 2 (September 9)	1	Aliz Kovács	18		"Language"	✔	✔	✔	✔
Episode 2 (September 9)	2	György Ádám Bakti	19		"Magamról" (Original Song)	✔	✔	✘	✔
Episode 2 (September 9)	3	Krisztián Mata	18		"Rabszolgalány"	✔	✔	–	–
Episode 2 (September 9)	4	Cinzia Conso	37		"(You Make Me Feel Like) A Natural Woman"	✔	✔	✔	✔
Episode 2 (September 9)	5	Szonja Fóris	15		"Nobody's Perfect"	✔	✔	✔	–
Episode 2 (September 9)	6	Norbert Farkas	16		"Még mindig"	–	–	–	–
Episode 2 (September 9)	7	Jázmin Beáta Haga			"Shoop"	✔	✔	✔	✔
Episode 2 (September 9)	8	Sándor Toldi	19		"A Song for You"	✘	✔	✔	✔
Episode 2 (September 9)	9	Viktória Doan	19		"Love on the Brain"	–	✔	–	–
Episode 2 (September 9)	10	Zoltán Lénárt			"Lehetne újra február"	–	–	–	–
Episode 2 (September 9)	11	Nina Eszes	19		"Summertime"	✔	✔	✔	✔
Episode 3 (September 16)	1	Erika Szakács			"Creep"	✔	✘	✔	✔
Episode 3 (September 16)	2	Roland Sárközi			"Könnyű álmot hozzon az éj"	–	–	–	–
Episode 3 (September 16)	3	Noémi Laura Sztojcsev			"Azt gondoltam, eső esik"	✔	✔	✔	✘
Episode 3 (September 16)	4	Benjámin Balogh			"Bukott diák"	–	–	–	–
Episode 3 (September 16)	5	Gergő Szekér			"Szabadság vándorai"	–	✔	–	–
Episode 3 (September 16)	6	Aurél Sándor			"7 Years"	✔	✔	✔	✘
Episode 3 (September 16)	7	Anita Patrícia Lakatos			"Halo"	✔	✔	✔	✔
Episode 3 (September 16)	8	Györgyi Deffent			"Highway to Hell"	–	–	✔	–
Episode 3 (September 16)	9	Anett Loghin			"Réten, réten, sej a györgyfalvi réten"	✔	✘	✔	✔
Episode 3 (September 16)	10	Roberta Lakner			"Nem alszom ma nálad" (Original Song)	✔	–	–	✔
Episode 3 (September 16)	11	Antónió Máté Teran Villarel	19	Budapest	"La Mordidita"	✔	–	–	✔
Episode 4 (September 23)	1	Péter Galambos	29	Budapest	"I Won't Let You Go"	–	✔	–	–
Episode 4 (September 23)	2	Nilla Duró	20	Szentendre	"Oops!... I Did It Again"	✔	–	–	✔
Episode 4 (September 23)	3	Ádám Kassai	21	Sopron	"Prey"	–	–	–	–
Episode 4 (September 23)	4	Carmen Jolis	22	Szentendre	"Hulló falevelek"	✔	✔	✔	✔
Episode 4 (September 23)	5	Zoltán Bagi	21	Alattya	"New York, New York"	–	–	–	✔
Episode 4 (September 23)	6	Katalin Ruzsik	36	Budapest	"Blame It on the Boogie"	–	–	–	–
Episode 4 (September 23)	7	Richard Fehér	33	Dömsöd	"Rise Like a Phoenix"	✔	–	–	–
Episode 4 (September 23)	8	Nóra Nagy	29	Budapest	"Bodak Yellow"	✔	–	–	–
Episode 4 (September 23)	9	Sebestyén Rónaszéki	28	Budapest	"A távollét"	✔	✔	–	–
Episode 4 (September 23)	10	Kevin Chukovich	18	Sopron	"Bye Bye" (Original Song)	–	–	–	–
Episode 4 (September 23)	11	Priscilla Megan Salva	23	London	"Dangerous Woman"	✔	✔	✔	✔
Episode 4 (September 23)	12	Elektra Magyar	25	Tahitótfalu	"Legyen valami"	–	–	–	–
Episode 4 (September 23)	13	Roland László Szabó	18	Agárd	"Csavargó"	✔	–	–	–
Episode 4 (September 23)	14	Gergő Palócz	30	Ajka	"Three Little Birds"	✔	✔	✔	✔
