= Gigi Radics =

Hungarian singer

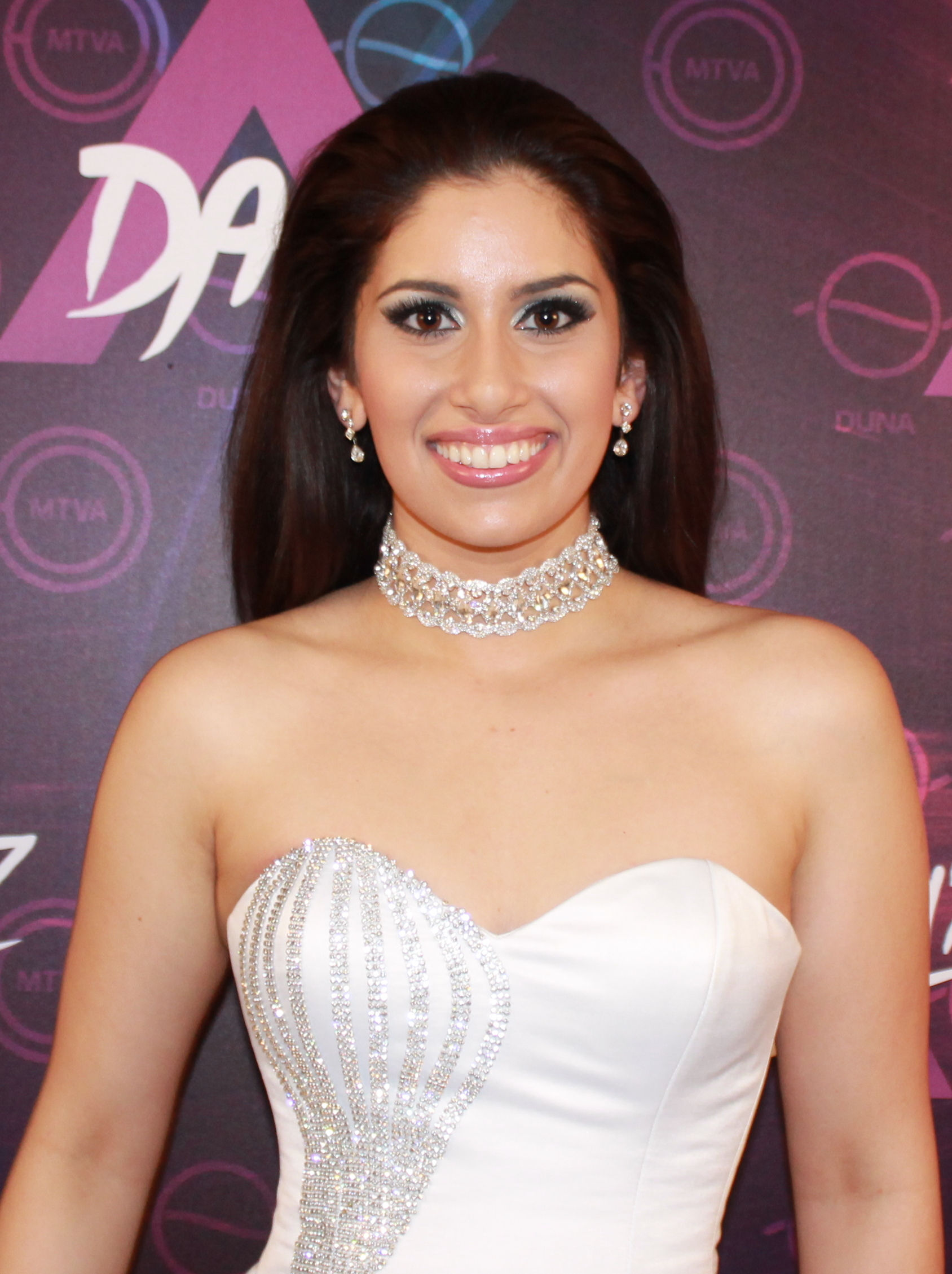
- Gigi Radics in February 2017

Background information
- Born: Georgina Radics; 17 August 1996 (age 30); Endrefalva, Hungary
- Genres: Pop; dance-pop; R&B
- Occupations: Singer, songwriter
- Years active: 2012–present
- Label: Magneoton
- Website: radicsgigi.hu

Georgina Radics (born 17 August 1996) known as Gigi Radics is a Hungarian singer-songwriter and media personality who is best known for participating in A Dal 2013 and 2014 and being one of the judges on the Hungarian X-Factor.

== Career ==
=== 2012: Megasztár ===
In February 2012, Radics was chosen to be one of the finalists of season six of the Hungarian music show, Megasztár. In her first live performance, she was paired against Andreas Csonka and performed "Hate That I Love You" by Rihanna and Ne-Yo. Radics ended up victorious. Radics was consistent each week and ended up winning the competition.

=== 2013–present: A Dal ===
On 10 January 2013, Radics was announced as one of the thirty finalists for A Dal 2013 with her song "Úgy fáj". She competed in the first heat, held on 16 February 2013. Radics was awarded the most jury points of the heat and was able to qualify to the semi-finals without having to face the public vote. Radics later competed in the second semi-final held on 24 February 2013. After receiving 42 points from the jury, there was a tie between herself and the group United. The jury later decided that Radics would be their second jury qualifier and she once again did not need to face the public vote. The final of A Dal took place on 2 March 2013. Radics performed fourth and received the second most jury points, advancing to the public vote round. In the public vote, she placed third only behind András Kállay-Saunders and his song "My Baby" and the winner ByeAlex and his song "Kedvesem".

On 11 December 2013, Radics was announced once again to be one of the thirty competitors in A Dal, this time with an English language dance-pop song "Catch Me". She competed in the third heat on 8 February 2014, performing first, but did not receive enough jury points to be a jury qualifier. However, Radics was later announced as one of the qualifiers through the public vote and moved on to the semi-finals. Radics performed eighth in the first semi-final held on 15 February 2014. She once again did not receive enough jury points, but this time the public vote did not send her through to the finals and she was eliminated.

She was again announced to partake in A Dal, this time in the 2017 edition with See it Through. She has progressed to the final.
