= Mihály Mező =

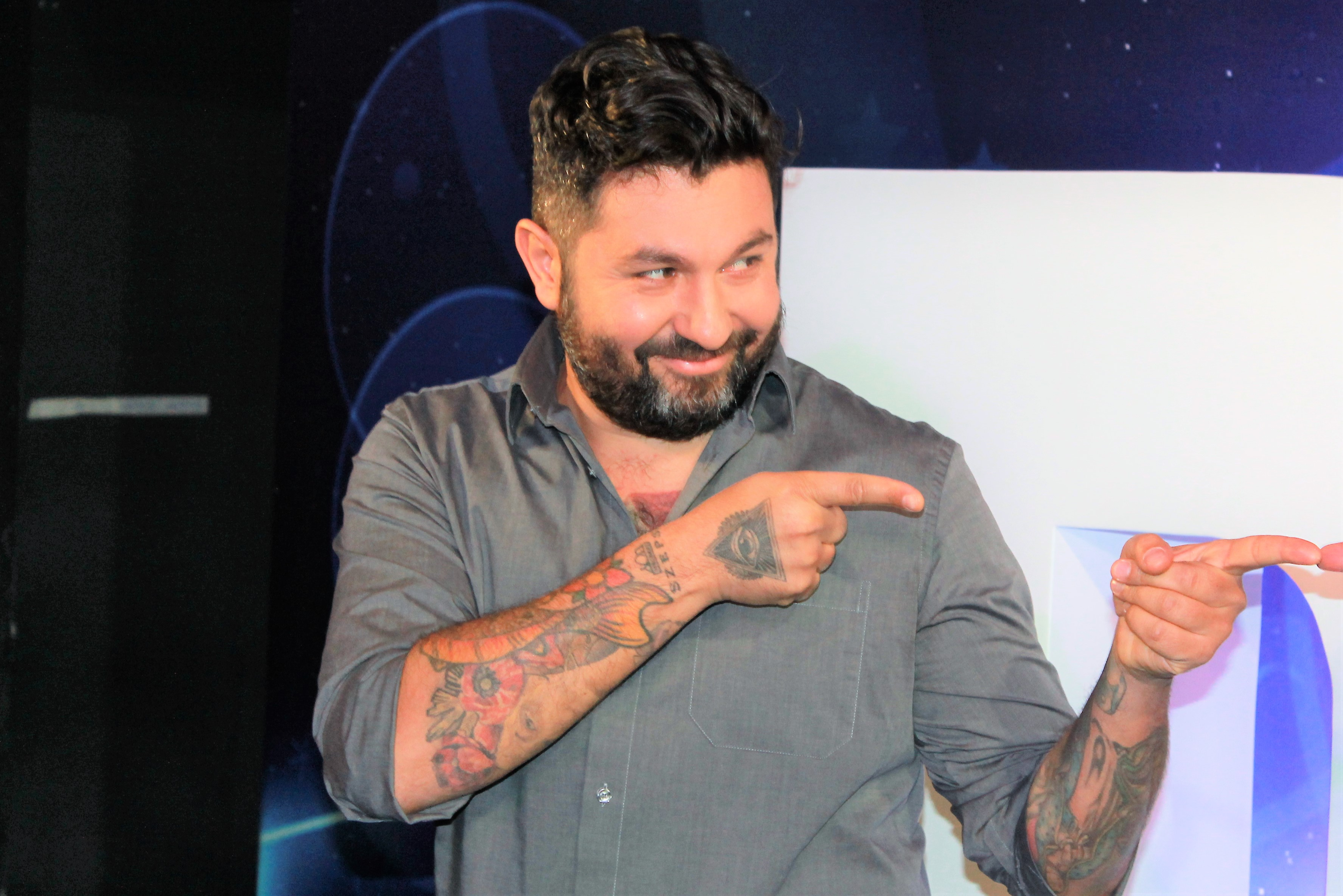
- Mező in 2017.

Background information
- Born: 1 August 1978 (age 46); Gyula, Hungary
- Genres: Funk rock, Pop
- Occupation: Singer
- Instrument: vocals
- Years active: 1989–present

Mihály Mező (born 1 August 1978, in Gyula), better known as Misi Mező, is a Hungarian singer and musician, most well known for being the lead vocalist for the rock band Magna Cum Laude.

== Life ==
Mező was raised in Doboz with his parents and three siblings: Kitti, Tünde and Róbert.

Between 1984 and 1992, he completed primary school in Doboz, and in 1989, he was in a traditional Gypsy band whose artistic director was his father. During his secondary school years, between 1992 and 1996, he played in the Three Amigo School Orchestra and later La Bomb band. He also holds a degree in Theology.

== Personal life ==
He and his wife Dóri have three children: Nimród, Bíborka and another daughter.

== Musical career ==
In 1999, Magna Cum Laude was founded. In 2009, they released their 10th anniversary album, 999, and their joint jubilee concert was performed at Petőfi Csarnok.

In 2011, Mező and 18 other singers sang Váltsd for the Hajrá Peti! Foundation. He was accompanied by Dorka Schodeinde, Mariann Szabó, Eszter Bartók, Barna Pély, Dorina Galambos, Péter Szolnoki, Péter Gerendás, Eszter Váczi, Laci Nagy, Mónika Veress, Évi Kolipka, Mátyás Pribojszki, Gréta Kovács, Zsófia Kállai-Kiss, György Petrik, Adrienn Nagy, and Klára Hajdu. The song was written by Galambos and Péter Nánási, while Petrik wrote the lyrics.

In 2011, with a 25-member military band, the ABS Big Band project, some Magna Cum Laude songs were covered into the swing genre and performed a concert with those songs.

Their songs started to become very popular. This was illustrated by songs such as Színezd újra!, that was used for the Szegedi Ifjúsági Napok celebration, as the anthem of SZIN, as well as with Pálinka dal, which was used by Sándor Buza for the Pálinka Festival.

His song, "Vidéki Sanzon", became the slogan of the movie SOS Love in 2007.

In 2014, he joined Budapest Bár for the band's fifth album.

== Other activities ==
In a charity Santa Claus Ceremony held in Doboz in 2010, he donated a valuable musical instrument to his former school.

=== The Voice ===
He was a judge for the only season of The Voice – Magyarország hangja, along with Andrea Malek, Tamás Somló, and Ferenc Molnár. His team, led by Dénes Pál, won the competition.

=== Rising Star ===
From 2014 to 2015, he was a judge on the first season of the TV2 talent show Rising Star.

=== A Dal ===
Mező was part of the interval act with Második Műszak for the first semi-final of A Dal 2016. On 6 December 2017, it was announced that Mező would be a judge in A Dal 2018, the 2018 edition of the selection process in Hungary for the Eurovision Song Contest 2018 in Lisbon, Portugal.

== Awards ==
- Fonogram Award - Pop album of the year (2007)
