= Dániel Kővágó =

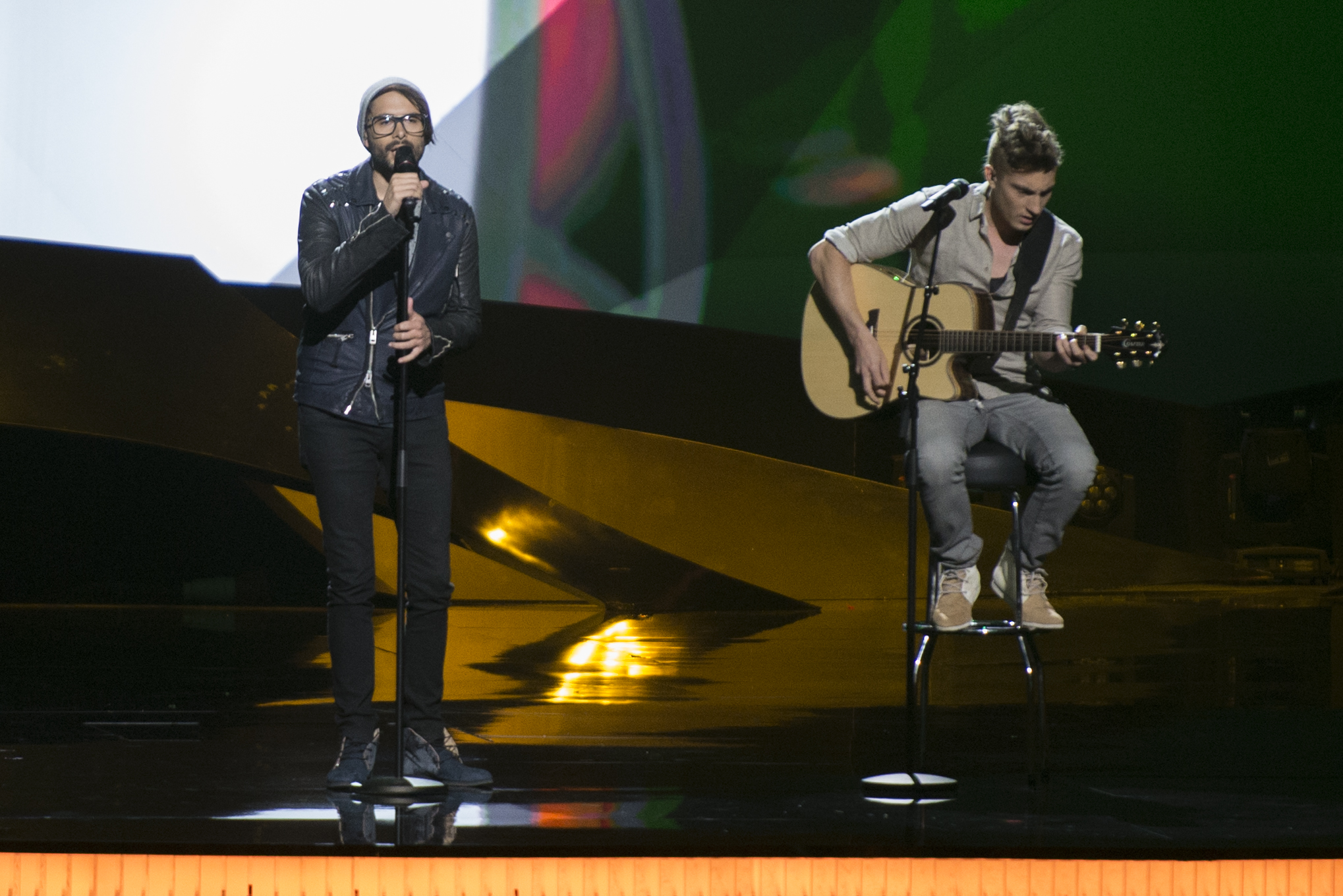
- Dániel Kővágó (right) with ByeAlex in 2013

Background information
- Also known as: Monstaz
- Born: 20 August 1990 (age 35); Budapest, Hungary
- Genres: Electronic rock
- Occupations: Guitarist; producer; DJ
- Instrument: Guitar

Dániel Kővágó (born 20 August 1990), sometimes known as Monstaz, is a Hungarian guitarist, producer and DJ.

== Career ==
In May 2013, Kővágó was the guitarist of ByeAlex during the Eurovision Song Contest 2013, performing the song "Kedvesem". The song ultimately placed tenth in the final with a score of 84 points.
