= Dénes Pál =

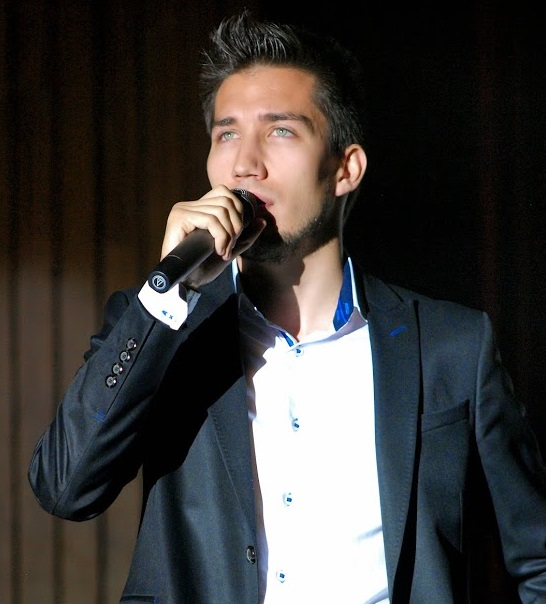

Background information
- Born: 19 March 1991 (age 35); Miskolc, Hungary
- Genres: Pop, Rock
- Occupation: Singer
- Instrument: vocals
- Years active: 2012 – present
- Label: Universal

Dénes Pál (born 19 March 1991, Miskolc) is a Hungarian singer and artist, most notable for winning the first season of the Hungarian version of The Voice, The Voice – Magyarország hangja.

== Personal life and career ==
Dénes Pál was born on 19 March 1991, in the town of Miskolc. His mother is a primary school teacher, whom he attended the school for 4 years. He graduated from primary school in the Fráter György Katolikus Gimnázium (George Martinuzzi Catholic Secondary School). He is currently part of the faculty at the University of Miskolc. In 2013, he won the first season of the Hungarian version of The Voice. In 2014, he also won the second season of the talent show Sztárban sztár. He is considered one of Hungary's most versatile performers. He has a baritone voice. In 2016 he participated in show A nagy duett with Zsuzsa Demcsák as his partner. He won the contest show Sztárban sztár +1 kicsi with his partner Vivien Varga on 5 February 2017.

=== A Dal ===
He first participated in A Dal, the national selection for Hungary in the Eurovision Song Contest, in 2013. The song was performed as a duet with Szilvia Agárdi with the song Szíveddel láss. They progressed from the 1st heat with 48 points (qualifying by the jury), to the second semi-final with 38 points (qualifying by the televote), to the final, where, despite qualifying for the superfinal where they could have been chosen to represent Hungary in the Eurovision Song Contest 2013, ByeAlex was chosen by the televote to represent Hungary that year.

The second (and as of the 2016 edition of A Dal, his last) time he participated in A Dal was in the 2014 edition of A Dal, performing solo with the song Brave New World. The song went from the third heat with 38 points (qualifying by jury), to the second semifinal with again 38 points (qualifying by the televote this time), and to the final where he did not qualify for the superfinal.

Awards and achievements
Preceded by N/A	The Voice – Magyarország hangja Winner; 2012-13	Succeeded by N/A
