= The Voice Magyarország =

- Genre: Reality competition
- Created by: John de Mol Jr. Roel van Velzen
- Presented by: Tamás Szabó Kimmel (1); Miklós Bányai (1); Bence Istenes (2)
- Judges: Mihály Mező (1); Ferenc Molnár (1); Andrea Malek (1); Tamás Somló (1); Curtis (2); Erika Miklósa (2); Nóra Trokán (2); Manuel (2)
- Country of origin: Hungary
- No. of seasons: 2
- No. of episodes: 31

Production
- Producers: Talpa Media Holding (1); ITV Studios (2)
- Production locations: Mafilm Movie Factory (1); Média Center Campona (2)

Original release
- Network: TV2
- Release: 12 October 2012 – 25 January 2013
- Network: RTL
- Release: 2 September – 18 November 2023

Related
- The Voice (franchise)

The Voice Magyarország (The Voice of Hungary in English), formerly The Voice – Magyarország hangja (The Voice – Voice of Hungary in English) is a Hungarian singing reality competition television series aimed to find new singing talent. Based on the reality singing competition The Voice of Holland, it is part of an international franchise created by Dutch television producer John de Mol Jr.. The first season was broadcast on TV2 from 12 October 2012 to 25 January 2013, as its first HD-quality show.

The Hungarian version of the show follows the original Dutch The Voice of Holland set of rules used by the show program. The show's arrival was originally announced in 2012, on the season 6 finale of Megasztár.

On 3 February 2023, it was announced that The Voice would return to Hungary with a second season, only this time it was broadcast on RTL.

== Format ==
During the pre-selection of candidates to the program makers select the best 150 singers who get into the auditions.

The specialty of pickups to take up the singer back to back in the Masters, and will only occur if the current voice of a singer you like them. A master's reversal is enough to get someone on the válogatóról. The Masters in ledfal under the seating position where the foreign version of "I Want You", Hungarian version of "I need you" is displayed.

If the driver is just a masterpiece turns while singing, you will be automatically turned the master team, more people, possibly all four turns critic, the competitor will select which team you want to be a master.

The argument has been dueling circuits, each team has its own master. The master himself paired racers and shares itself decides what to do with the duel. After the duel of the jury members to decide whom to allocate more of the live show into the actual duel.

During the live shows of singers they are sizing up one another to live only a two masters team to participate. The two master schedule, that is, which team will be the master Whose team pairing will be included in a steady performance. At the end of every live show they will decide the fate of four men and two master lecture in a man escapes, while the other falls. This continued until all four master rider remains only two, they participate in the 8 finals, each rider is a master (who (audience & judges) has fewer total votes) are eliminated. The remaining one of the four singers taking part in the finals, in the finale (in which each of the four participating in a master, one of the best).

=== Coaches' teams ===
Winner
Runner-up
Third place
Fourth place

- Winners are in bold, the finalists in the finale are in italicized font, and the eliminated artists are in small font.

Season	Ferenc Molnár	Andrea Malek	Tamás Somló	Mihály Mező
1	Bálint Gájer; Olivér Berkes; Dávid Henderson; Anh Quan Nguyen; Anna Karai; Fatima Mohamed	Dávid Nádor; Dávid Schwartz; Péter Schrott; Gabriella Torzsa; Zsolt Bakonyi; Dóra Schweitzer	Viktor Weisz; Regina Husnulinna; Saci Szécsi; Heni Czerovszky; Réka Piroska Kriszta; Erik Dózsa	**Dénes Pál**; Mónika Veres; Böbe Szécsi; Bűdi Szilárd; Petra Pákai; Tamás Gyöngyösi
2	Curtis	Nóra Trokán	Manuel	Erika Miklósa
2	Timóteus Virág; Ádám Bakti; Cinzia Conso	Szonja Fóris; Péter Galambos; Lilla Anna Kalocsa	Harmat Kovács; Artúr Berki; Jázmin Haga	**Erika Szakács**; Aliz Kovács; Gábor Homoki

== Series overview ==
Season	First aired	Last aired	Winner	Runner-up	Third place	Fourth place	Winning coach	Host(s)		Coaches (chair's order)			
Season	First aired	Last aired	Winner	Runner-up	Third place	Fourth place	Winning coach	Host(s)		1	2	3	4
1	12 Oct 2012	25 Jan 2013	Dénes Pál	Bálint Gájer	Dávid Nádor	Viktor Weisz	Mihály Mező	Tamás Kimmel	Miklós Bányai	Ferenc	Andrea	Tomás	Mihály
2	2 Sep 2023	18 Nov 2023	Erika Szakács	Aliz Kovács	Harmat Kovács	—N/a	Erika Miklósa	Bence Istenes		Curtis	Nóra	Manuel	Erika

== Coaches ==
Coaches gallery

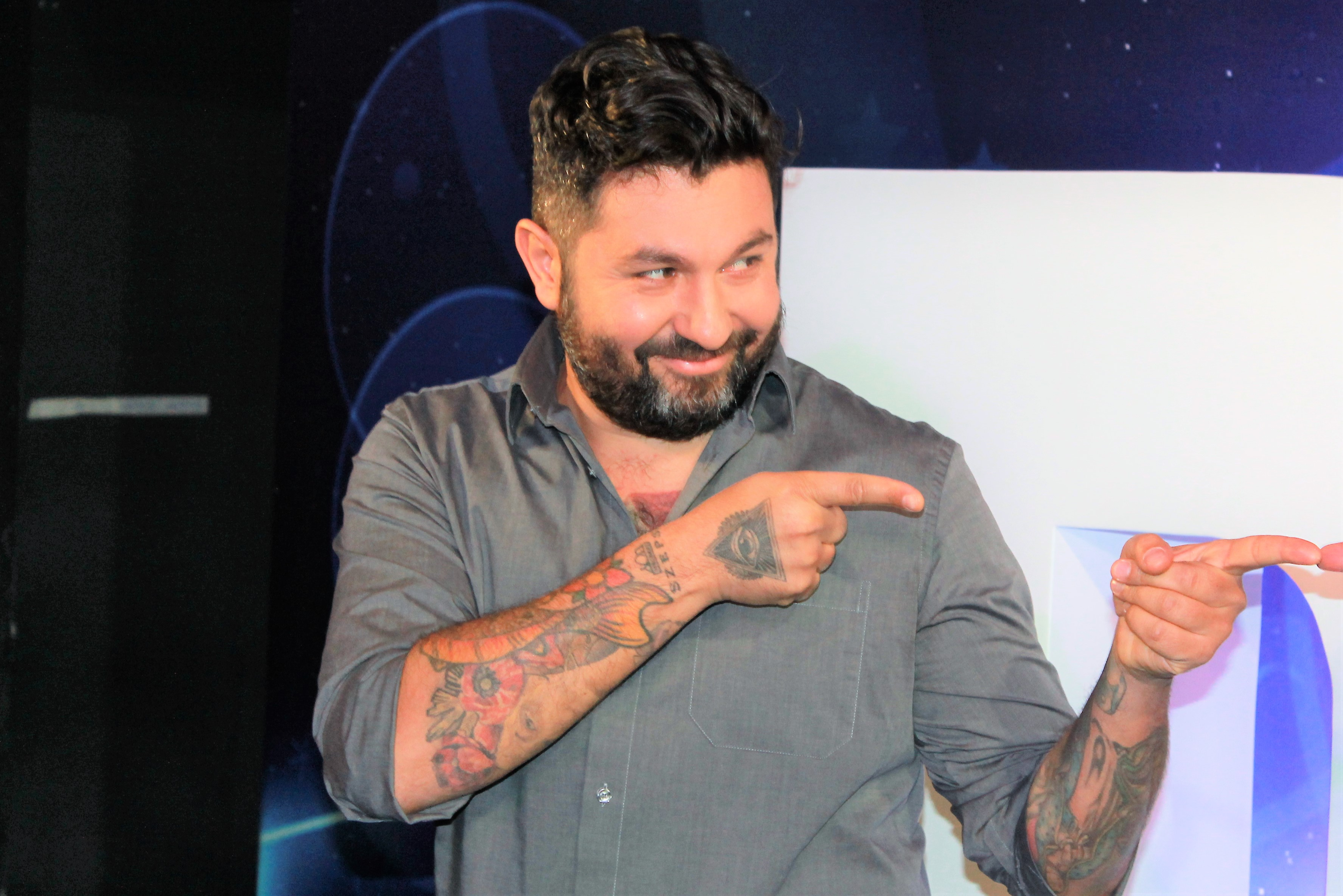
Mihály Mező (2012–13)

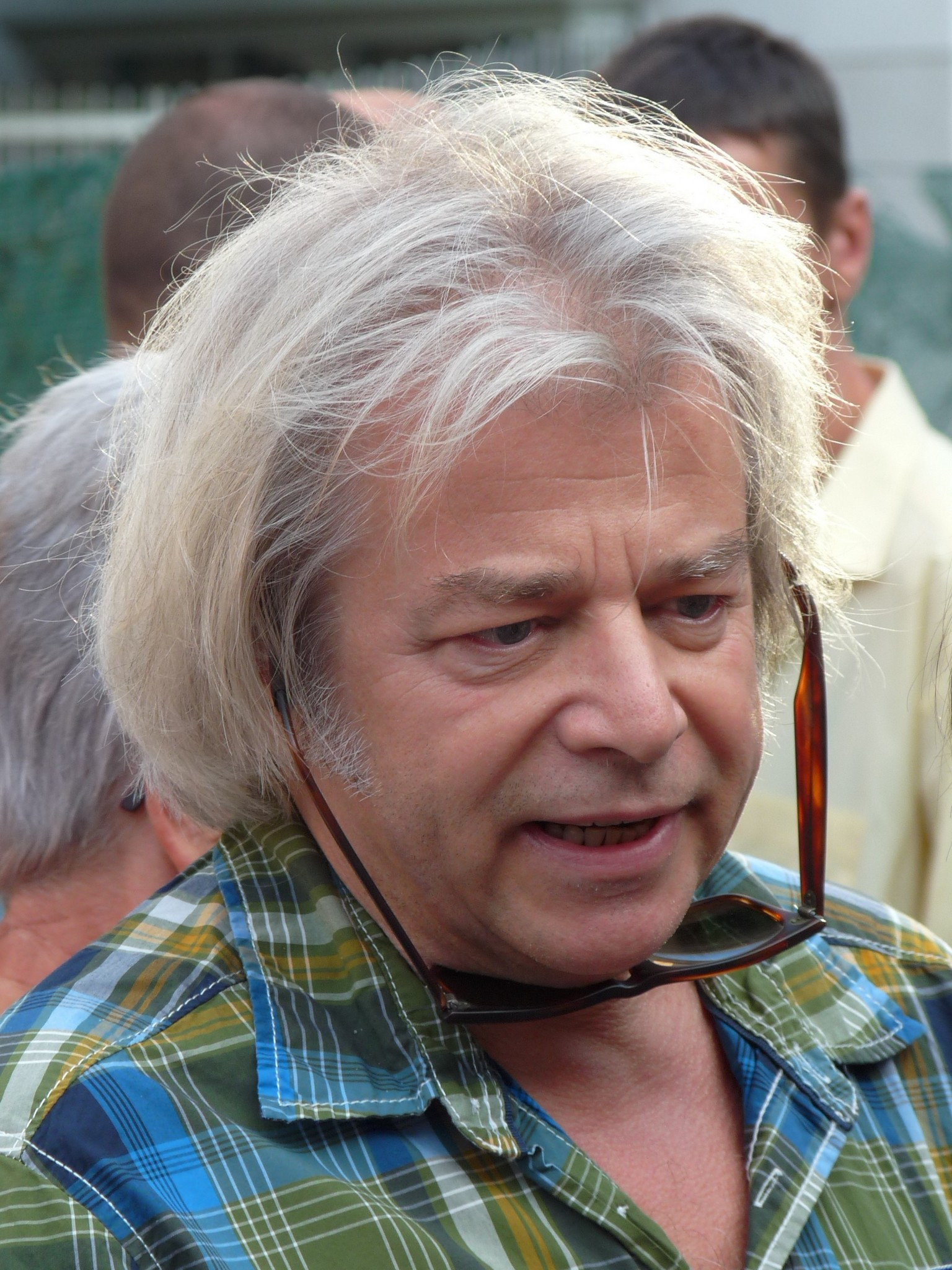
Tamás Somló (2012–13)

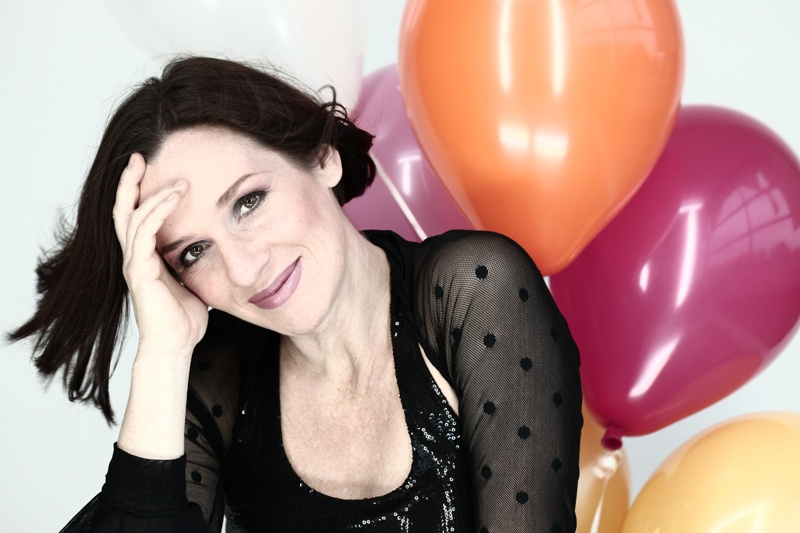
Andrea Malek (2012–13)

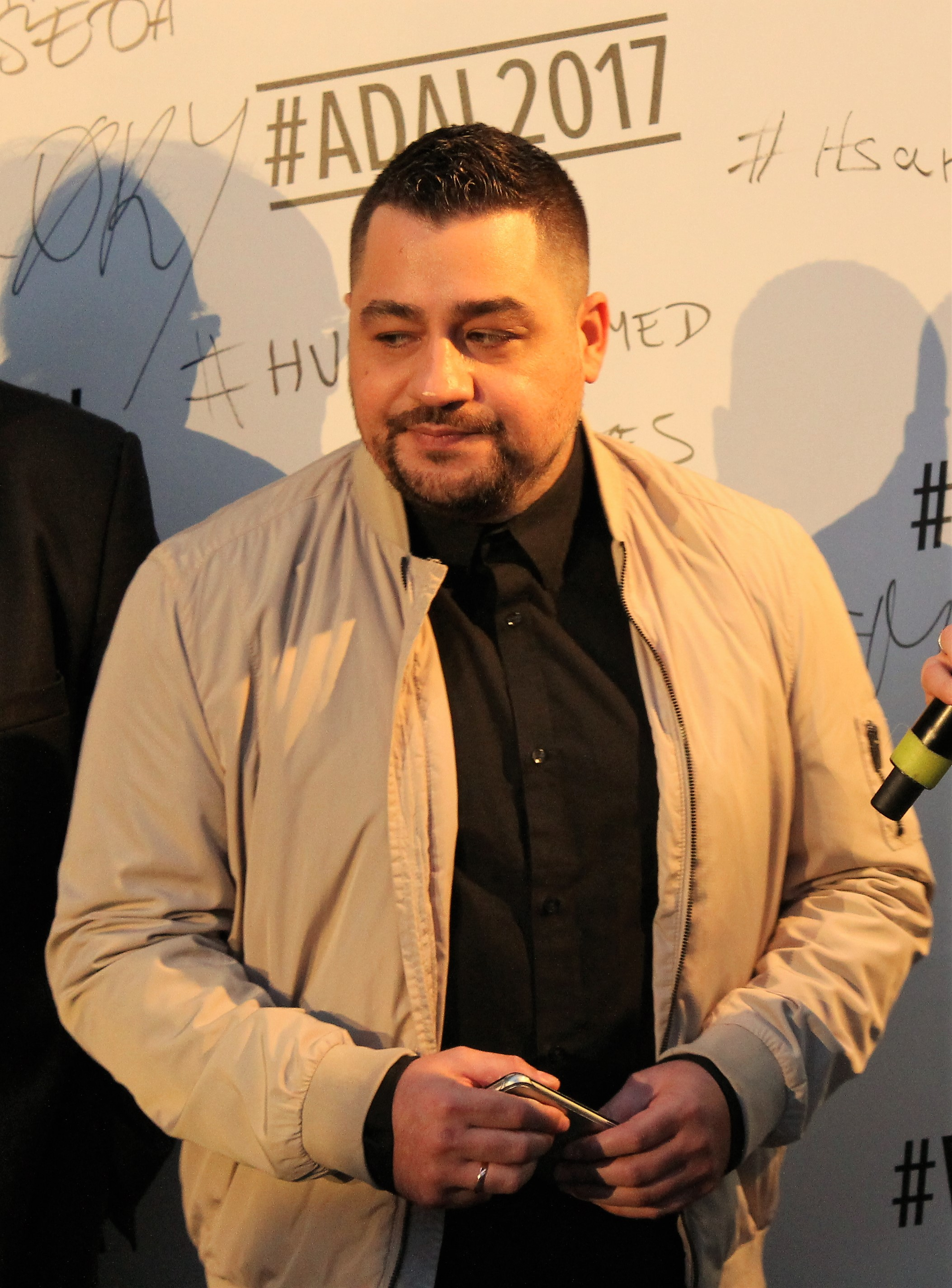
Ferenc Molnár (2012–13)

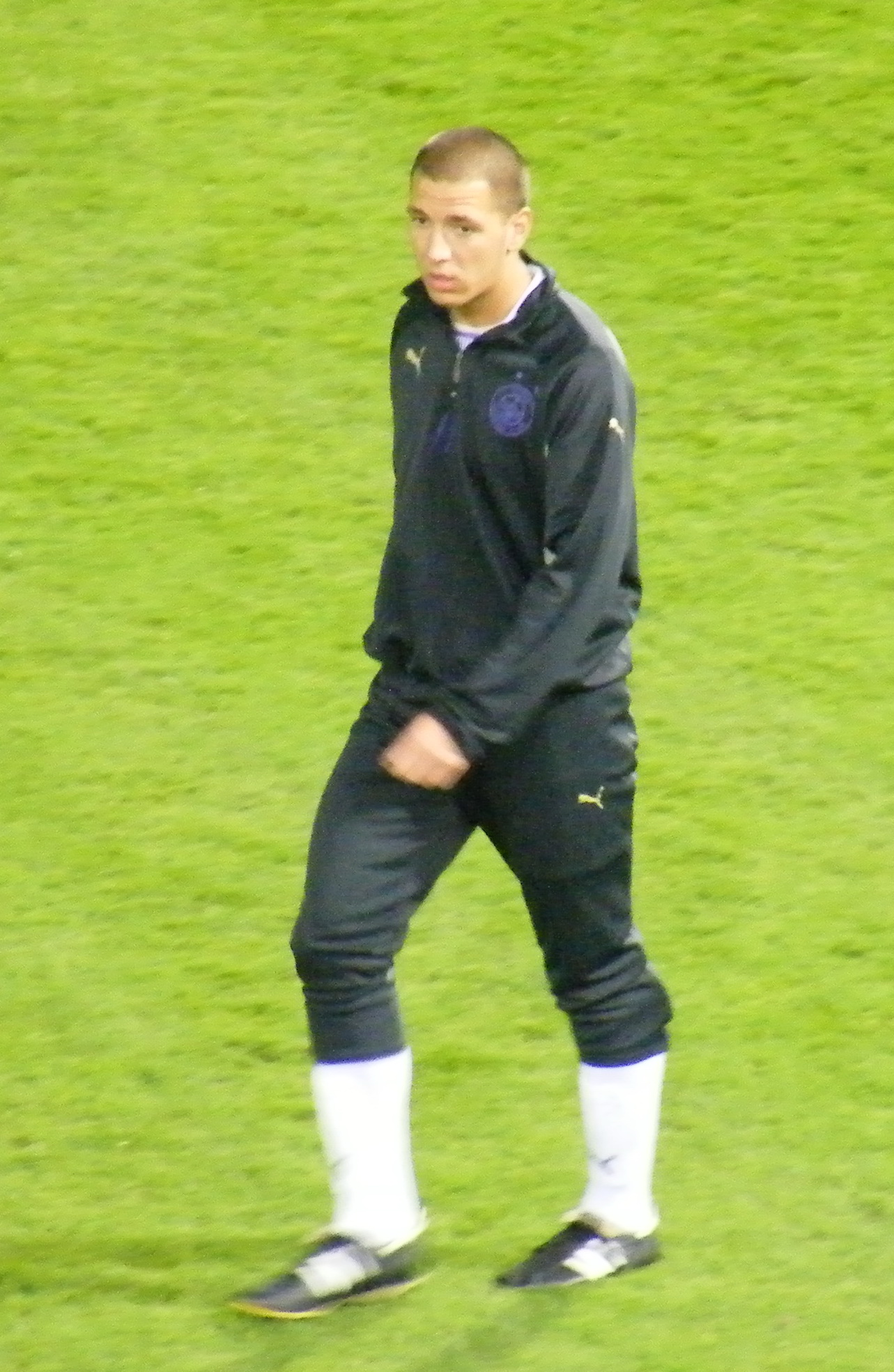
Curtis (2023)

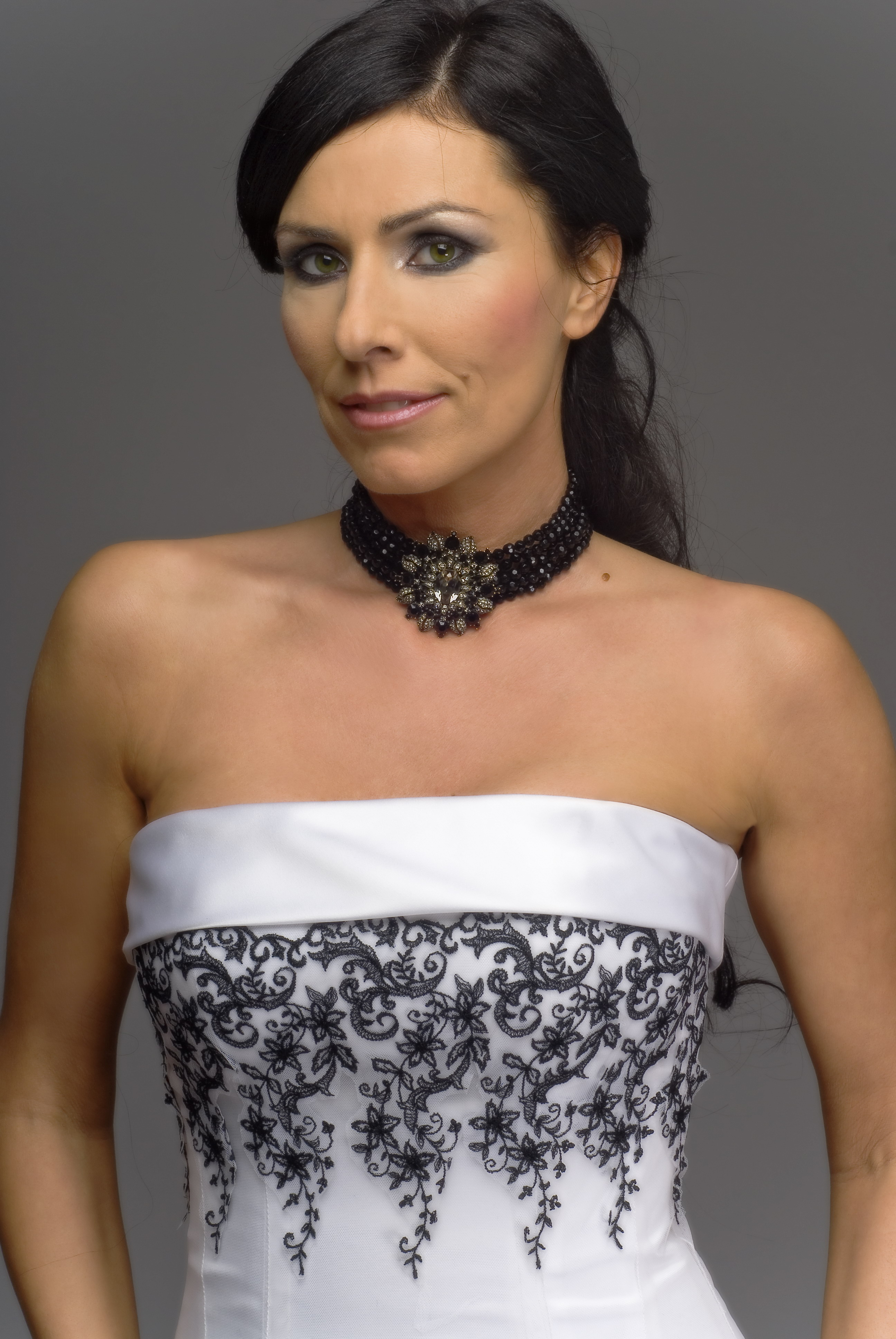
Erika Miklósa (2023)

Manuel (2023)

Nóra Trokán (2023)
