= Rising Star (Hungarian TV series) =

- Developed by: Screenz Cross Media LTD
- Presented by: Nóra Ördög; Péter Majoros
- Judges: Gábor Miklós Kerényi; Anna Pásztor; Pál Feke; Mihály Mező
- Original language: Hungarian
- No. of series: 1
- No. of episodes: 16

Production
- Production company: Keshet Broadcasting

Original release
- Network: TV2
- Release: October 26, 2014 – February 15, 2015

Rising Star is a Hungarian singing reality competition television series, and the Hungarian edition of the international reality television franchise Rising Star. It is based on the Israeli singing competition HaKokhav HaBa (meaning The Next Star) produced by Keshet Broadcasting Ltd. The program format lets viewers vote for contestants via mobile apps. The show premiered in 2014 on channel TV2.

== Series summary ==
Season	Premiere	Finale	Winner	Runner-up	Third place	Fourth place	Host(s)	Judges
1	October 26, 2014	February 15, 2015	Palmira Várhegyi Lucas	Norbert Czibi	Peter Srámek	Alfréd Fehérvári	Nóra Ördög; Péter Majoros	Gábor Miklós Kerényi; Anna Pásztor; Pál Feke; Misi Mező

== Season 1 (2014–2015) ==
=== Elimination table ===
– The contestant with highest percentage on the week
– Took part in the Elimination Duel
– The contestant is eliminated

#	Artist	Week 1 (December 14)	Week 2 (December 21)	Week 3 (January 4)	Week 4 (January 11)	Week 5 (January 18)	Week 6 (January 25)	Week 7 (February 1)	Semi-Final (February 8)	Final (February 15)		
#	Artist	Week 1 (December 14)	Week 2 (December 21)	Week 3 (January 4)	Week 4 (January 11)	Week 5 (January 18)	Week 6 (January 25)	Week 7 (February 1)	Semi-Final (February 8)	Round 1	Round 2	Victory Duel
1.	Palmira Várhegyi Lucas	Not in the show	Returned to the show	5th 79%	1st 86%	1st 84%	4th 75%	1st 81%	1st 79%	1st 53%	1st 56%	Winner; 52,51%
2.	Norbert Czibi	1st 85%	2nd 86%	2nd 83%	2nd 78%	3rd 81%	1st 79%	3rd 78%	2nd 74%	1st 53%	2nd 54%	Runner-up; 52,15%
3.	Peter Srámek	3rd 83%	5th 79%	8th 73%	5th 68%	9th 54%	2nd 78%	3rd 78%	5th 58%	3rd 50%	3rd 53%	3rd place in the final
4.	Gábor Alfréd Fehérvári	6th 73%	4th 85%	6th 75%	6th 55%	2nd 83%	6th 63%	5th 70%	3rd 72%	4th 53%	4th place in the final	
5.	Viki Singh	5th 77%	1st 89%	3rd 81%	4th 76%	5th 72%	3rd 77%	2nd 79%	4th 70%	Eliminated in the Semi-final		
6.	Helén Gondi	2nd 84%	3rd 85%	3rd 81%	2nd 78%	6th 70%	5th 73%	6th 66%	6th 43%	Eliminated in the Semi-Final		
7.	Gyopár Kovács	10th 62%	10th 43%	11th 43%	10th 40%	7th 64%	7th 57%	7th 40%	Eliminated in Week 12			
8.	Alexandra Szén	8th 69%	8th 63%	1st 86%	8th 48%	4th 79%	8th 44%	Eliminated in Week 11				
9.	Izsák Palmer	4th 80%	6th 75%	6th 75%	6th 55%	8th 60%	Eliminated in Week 10					
10.	Anna Udvarias	9th 67%	7th 70%	9th 62%	9th 44%	Eliminated in Week 9						
11.	Krisztián Ádám	7th 72%	9th 62%	10th 44%	Eliminated in Week 8							
12.	Lili & Józsi Sárközi	10th 40%	11th 40%	Eliminated in Week 7								
13.	Ádám Heiser	12th 35%	Eliminated in Week 6									
