= Bogi (singer) =

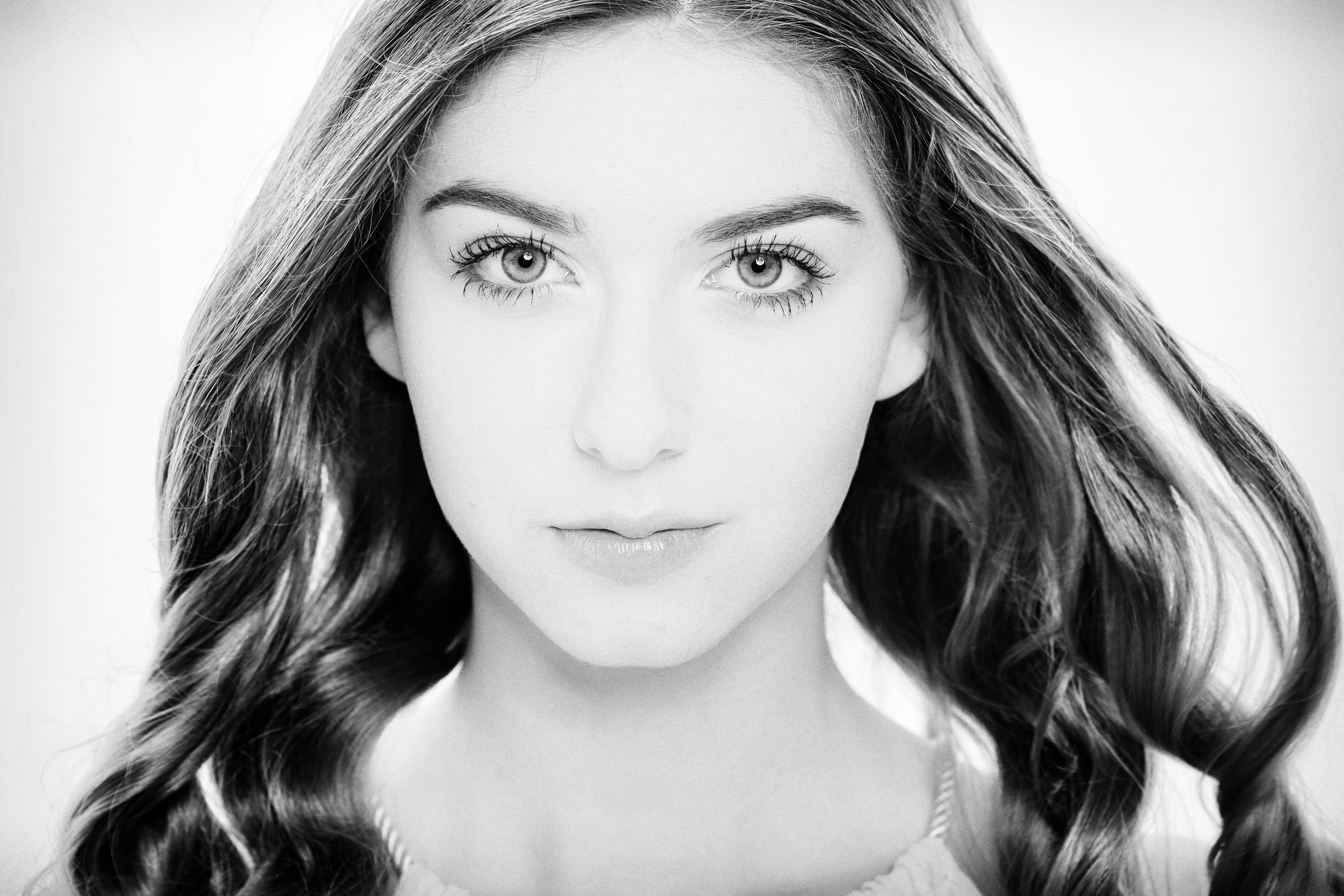
- Dallos-Nyers in 2013

Background information
- Also known as: Bogi Dallos
- Born: Boglárka Dallos-Nyers; 2 April 1997 (age 29); Győr, Hungary
- Genres: Pop, R&B, indie pop
- Occupation: Singer
- Years active: 2011–present
- Label: Magneoton
- Website: bogimusic.hu

Boglárka Dallos-Nyers (born 2 April 1997), better known as simply Bogi or Bogi Dallos, is a Hungarian music coach, singer-songwriter and actress, best known for participating in A Dal 2013, 2014 and 2015.

== Career ==
=== 2013–present: A Dal and breakthrough ===
On 10 January 2013, Bogi was announced as one of the thirty finalists for A Dal 2013 with her Hungarian language R&B song "Tükörkép" (Reflection). She competed in the first heat held on 2 February 2013, but did not receive enough jury or public votes to move on to the semi-finals and was eliminated.

On 11 December 2013, Bogi was announced once again to be one of the thirty competitors in A Dal 2014, this time with an English language indie pop song "We All". She competed in the second heat on 1 February 2014, and was one of the three jury qualifiers, advancing to the semi-finals. She competed in the first semi-final held on 15 February 2014, and once again achieved enough jury votes to become one of the jury qualifiers and advance to the final. In the final held on 22 February 2014, Bogi performed second. It was later announced she was one of the four contestants who received enough jury votes to move on to the top four, where the winner will be decided by public votes. Bogi did not win, but placed in the top four. She represented Hungary in the OGAE Second Chance Contest 2014 with "We All", placing fifteenth.

On 8 December 2014, it was announced that Bogi would take part in A Dal once again with the song "World of Violence". She participated in the first heat, and passed onto the semi-final courtesy of the jury vote, where she was eliminated.

== Discography ==
=== Singles ===
Year	Title	Chart positions	Notes
Year	Title	HU	Notes
2012	"Mesehős"	–	Non-album single(s)
2013	"Tükörkép"	–	A Dal 2013
2013	"Végzet"	–	Non-album single(s)
2013	"We All"	1	A Dal 2014
2014	"Feels So Right"	–	Non-album single(s)
2014	"World of Violence"	–	A Dal 2015
