= Caramel (singer) =

Hungarian singer (born 1982)

Ferenc Molnár
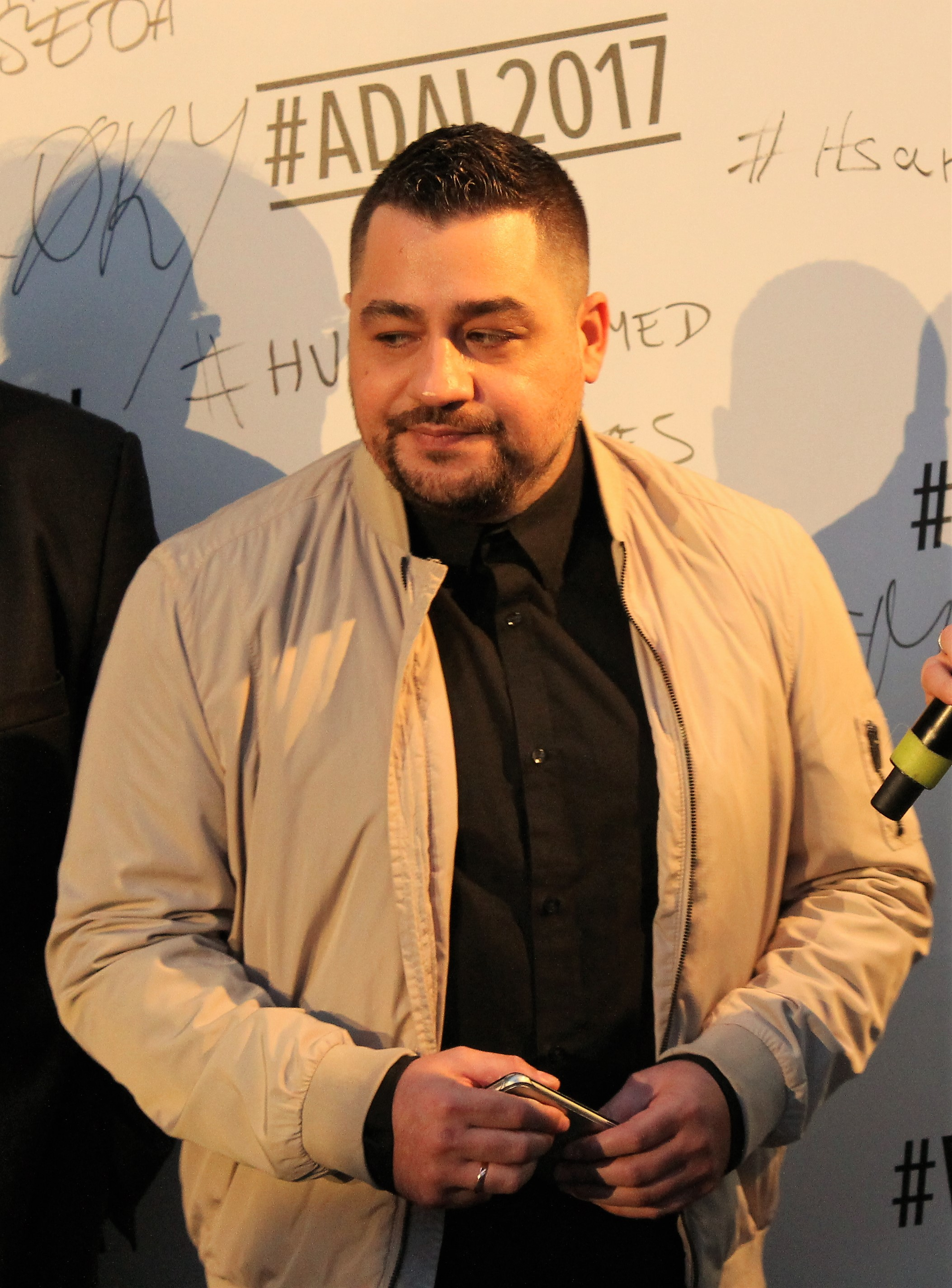
- Ferenc Molnár in 2016.

Background information
- Also known as: Caramel
- Born: 1 February 1982 (age 44); Szolnok, Hungary
- Genre: R'n'b
- Occupation: Singer
- Instrument: vocals
- Years active: 2004–present
- Label: Tom Tom Records

Ferenc Molnár (born 1 February 1982, Szolnok), known by the stage name Caramel, is a Hungarian musician and singer. He is most well known for winning the second season of Megasztár.

== Personal life ==
Caramel was born on 1 February 1982 in the town of Szolnok. He is of Hungarian Roma descent. At age 16, he moved to Törökszentmiklós with his stepfather, mother and siblings. His parents' relationship deteriorated after his brother was killed in a car crash, leading him to move out at age 17. Work was hard to find because of his herniated disc. He got his nickname Caramel from a friend when he received a negative response from a publisher. He is married to Szilvia Molnár-Szilágyi and together they have two children (a daughter and a son) named Sophia and Miron.

== Musician ==
In 2004, he applied to Megasztár. In 2005, Caramel narrowly won over fellow contestant Tamás Palcsó to become the first contest's winner. He started to compile his first album in his apartment. In 2005, he released two albums: a compilation of the songs he sang at Megasztár, the second one being called Nyugalomterápia. Both reached number one at the JAHASZ charts. In December of that year, he held his first release concert with other artists, such as István Lerch, Eszter Szabó, Joci Pápai, and Eszter Bartók.

In 2006, he released his next album, Újrahangolva, with music videos filmed in London. More albums followed in 2010, 2011 and 2014. He took part in multiple music shows as judges, including the Hungarian version of The Voice, and Az ének iskolája, a school-inspired music competition show.

In 2011, Caramel was selected as a contestant for A Dal 2012, the first edition for the national selection of Hungary in the Eurovision Song Contest, with the song "Vízió". It was one of the top 4 by televoting, but lost to Compact Disco. He was a judge for the only season of The Voice – Magyarország hangja. He was a judge in A Dal 2017 and was also a jury member for Hungary for the Eurovision Song Contest 2017.
