= Monika Hoffman =

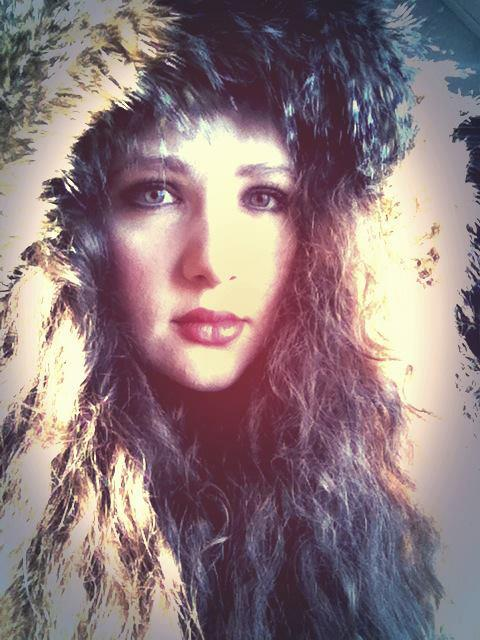

Background information
- Born: 11 March 1982 (age 44); Malmö, Sweden
- Genres: Jazz, pop
- Occupations: Singer; songwriter
- Website: monikahoffman.com

Monika Reneé Hoffman (11 March 1982) is a Swedish–Hungarian singer and songwriter from Malmö, Sweden.

== Life and career ==
Monika Hoffman's was born in Malmö. Her father is Swedish and her mother is Hungarian, so she grew up speaking fluent Hungarian, Swedish, and English. At the age of three she began playing the violin and later on she also began playing the piano and the saxophone. As a child and teenager, she went to various music schools and later went on to study at Berklee College of Music. She was granted the Berklee College of Music World Tour Scholarship and got the opportunity to share the stage with people like Michael Brecker and Charlie Hayden.

In 2005, she auditioned for the Hungarian Megasztar (Idol) and was selected to be part of the final 12. In spite of only placing ninth overall, she became one of the most popular and successful contestants from that season, kickstarting her career as a singer in Hungary. It resulted in two studio albums, the pop oriented "Én vagyok a nő" (I'm the woman), followed by the jazz album "Monika Hoffman And The Scandinavian Knights". The latter one featured one of Hungary's best jazz-pianists, Róbert Lakatos.

Monika Hoffman has twice competed in the Hungarian preselection for the Eurovision Song Contest. In 2008 with the song "Légy te az első" and in 2013 with the song "Hullócsillag".

== Discography ==
=== Studio albums ===
- Én vagyok a nö
- Monika Hoffman and the Scandinavian Knights
- Let's Run Away featuring Paquito D'Rivera
- Snowbound
