= Erika Miklósa =

Hungarian coloratura soprano

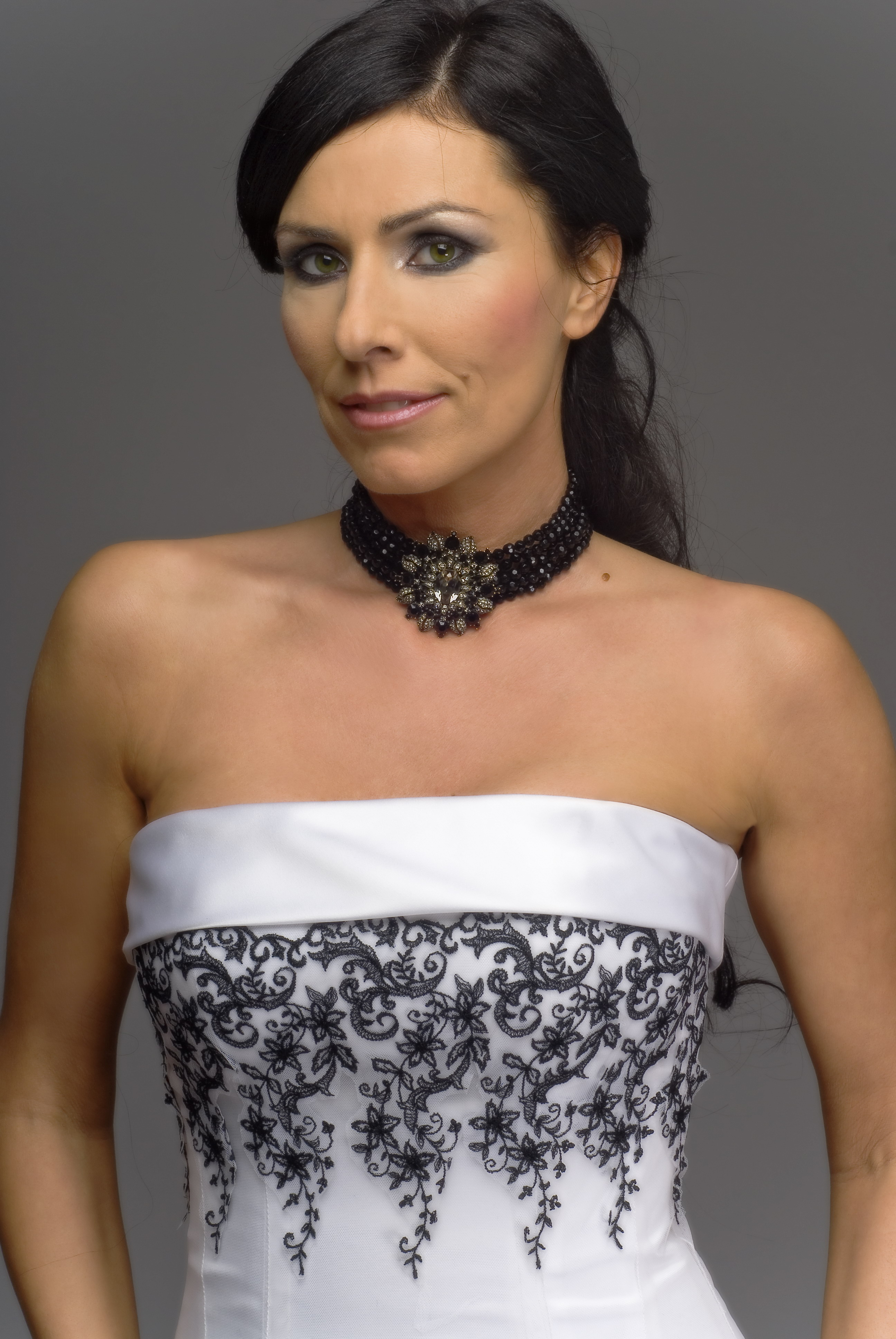
- Born: 9 June 1970 (age 55); Kiskunhalas, Hungarian People's Republic
- Occupation: Operatic soprano
- Years active: 1991–present
- Organization: Hungarian State Opera
- Website: miklosaerika.hu

Erika Miklósa (born 9 June 1970) is a Hungarian coloratura soprano.

== Career ==
Born in the southern Hungarian town of Kiskunhalas, she spent her youth as an athlete training for the heptathlon. Miklósa was Hungarian Junior Champion in the high jump. However, an accident forced her to switch career paths. Because of her good singing skills she chose to be a singer. At first, she sang at family gatherings, weddings, and formal celebrations. On one such occasion, a singing-master heard her and almost immediately began to teach the 16-year-old. Soon she went on to study music at the Franz Liszt Conservatory of Music in Szeged as well as in Milan and New York. She became a soloist at the Hungarian State Opera in 1990. Her signature role is the Queen of the Night from Mozart's The Magic Flute. She sang also at the Royal Opera House in London, at the Vienna State Opera, at the Metropolitan Opera in New York and many more famous opera houses. In 2004, she debuted at the Metropolitan Opera in her signature Queen of the Night role.

== Awards and commendations ==
- Pro Opera Lyrica – Opera Singer of the Year 1993 (Hungary)
- International Mozart Competition – 1st Prize in voice category (1993)
- European Award for Culture, Zurich (1995)
- Order of Merit Member Cross (Hungary, 1998)
- Honorary Citizen of Kiskunhalas (1999)
- Artist of Bács County (2003)
- Kossuth Prize (2012)

== Discography ==
- Die Zauberflöte (2006) with Dorothea Röschmann, Christoph Strehl, René Pape; Claudio Abbado conducting; Deutsche Grammophon
- West Side Story (2009) Sony
- The Magic Flute (2011), Metropolitan Opera
