= Kedvesem =

ByeAlex song

Single by ByeAlex

from the album Szörpoholista
- Released: 18 November 2012
- Genre: Indie pop; Minimal
- Length: 3:24; 3:09 (Zoohacker Remix)
- Label: Goldilox
- Songwriters: Alex Márta, Zoltán Palásti Kovács (Zoohacker)

ByeAlex singles chronology
| "Te vagy" (2012) | "Kedvesem" (2012) | "Nekemte" (2013) |

Eurovision Song Contest 2013 entry
- Country: Hungary
- Artist: ByeAlex
- Language: Hungarian
- Composers: Alex Márta & Zoltán Palásti Kovács
- Lyricist: Alex Márta

Finals performance
- Semi-final result: 8
- Semi-final points: 66
- Final result: 10
- Final points: 84

Entry chronology
- ◄ "Sound Of Our Hearts" (2012)
- "Running" (2014) ►

"Kedvesem" is a song by performed by Hungarian indie-pop singer ByeAlex. The Zoohacker remix of the song was selected as the entry to represent Hungary in the Eurovision Song Contest 2013 in Malmö.

== Release and background ==
Kedvesem was first heard on ByeAlex's YouTube channel on 14 November 2012. However it was officially released on iTunes on 18 November 2012. The Zoohacker Remix version of the song was Hungary's entry in the Eurovision Song Contest 2013.

=== A Dal and Eurovision Song Contest 2013 ===
ByeAlex performed the song in A Dal 2013 where qualified to the final and won the competition by viewer votes. Therefore, he represented Hungary in the Eurovision Song Contest 2013. Kedvesem (Zoohacker Remix) competed in the second semi-final of the Eurovision Song Contest 2013 on 16 May 2013 and managed to qualify for a spot in the final on 18 May 2013. In the final, the song finished in tenth position with 84 points, the third-highest position Hungary had ever achieved in the competition.

== Track listing ==
Digital download

1. "Kedvesem" - 3:24
2. "Kedvesem" (Zoohacker Remix) - 3:09
3. "One For Me" - 3:24

== Charts ==
| Chart (2013) | Peak position |
|---|---|
| Austria (Ö3 Austria Top 40) | 59 |
| Belgium (Ultratip Bubbling Under Flanders) | 36 |
| Belgium (Ultratip Bubbling Under Wallonia) | 44 |
| Finland (The Official Finnish Download Chart) | 22 |
| Germany (GfK) | 39 |
| Hungary (Rádiós Top 40) | 1 |
| Hungary (Single Top 40) | 1 |
| Iceland (Tonlist) | 18 |
| Netherlands (Single Top 100) | 35 |
| Sweden (DigiListan) | 10 |
| Switzerland (Schweizer Hitparade) | 40 |
