= ByeAlex =

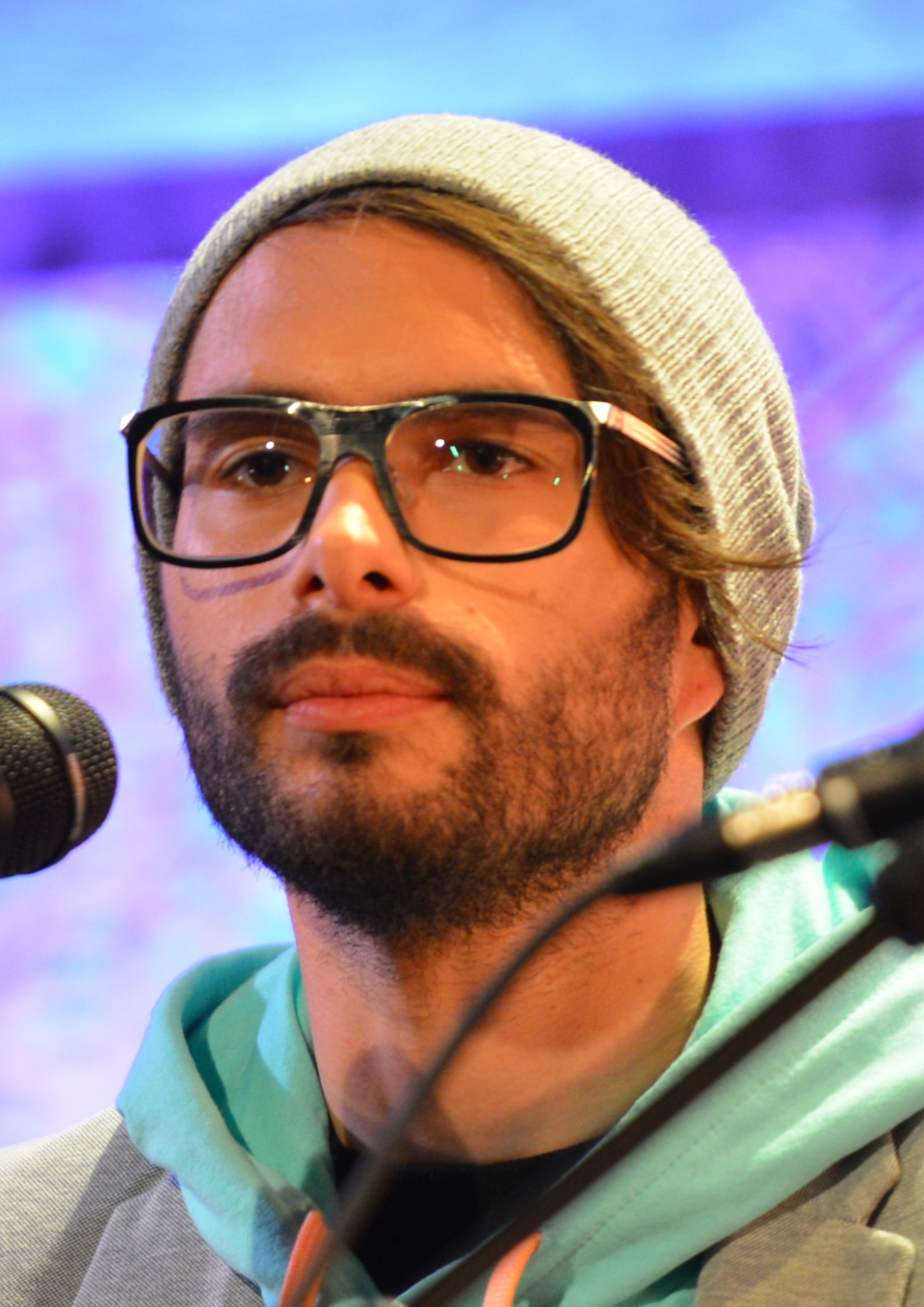
- ByeAlex (2013)

Background information
- Born: Alex Márta; 6 June 1984 (age 42); Kisvárda, Hungary
- Origin: Hungarian
- Genres: Indie pop
- Occupations: Singer, songwriter, journalist, novelist
- Instrument: Vocal
- Labels: CLS Music, Hungary

Alex Márta (born 6 June 1984), better known by his stage name ByeAlex, is a Hungarian indie pop musical artist and music coach. He represented Hungary in the Eurovision Song Contest 2013 in Malmö, Sweden, with the song "Kedvesem", coming 10th in the final. In 2014 his debut novel Özséb, egy öngyilkos Miskolcon (Özséb, a suicide in Miskolc) was published in Hungary.

In the summer of 2015, ByeAlex decided to add 'és a Slepp' ('and the Slepp') to the name of band referring to the following musicians playing with Alex: Szeifert Bálint – bass guitar, vocals, Schnellbach Dávid – guitar, Tóth G. Zoltán – (acoustic) guitar, (and manager), Fekete Balázs – drums.

In 2017, the formation Senkise was formed consisting of Alex Márta and Gergő Schmidt (a.k.a. TEMBO).

== Early life and career ==
ByeAlex was born in Kisvárda. He started singing at an early age. He went to school in Fényeslitke, and went on to study at the Bessenyei György Highschool in Kisvárda. He got a master's degree in philosophy from the University of Miskolc. He became famous when he won A Dal, the national selection competition in Hungary for the Eurovision Song Contest in 2013. He then represented Hungary with the song Kedvesem. He returned to A Dal for the 2018 edition, writing the music and lyrics for H Y P N O T I Z E D, performed by Roland Gulyás.

== Discography ==
List of albums, with selected details
Title	Details
Szörpoholista	Released: December 2013; Format: CD, digital; Label: CLS (CLS EM SA004-2)
Szív(Sz)Kill (as ByeAlex és a Slepp)	Released: June 2017; Format: CD, digital; Label: Magneoton (5999887716010)
Rehab (as ByeAlex és a Slepp)	Released: 2019; Format: CD, digital; Label: Gold Record Music Kft. (GR202006)

== See also ==
- Hungarian indie
- Hungarian pop

Awards and achievements
Preceded by Compact Disco with "Sound of Our Hearts"	Hungary in the Eurovision Song Contest; 2013	Succeeded by András Kállay-Saunders with "Running"
