= List of awards and nominations received by Ava Max =

Ava Max awards and nominations
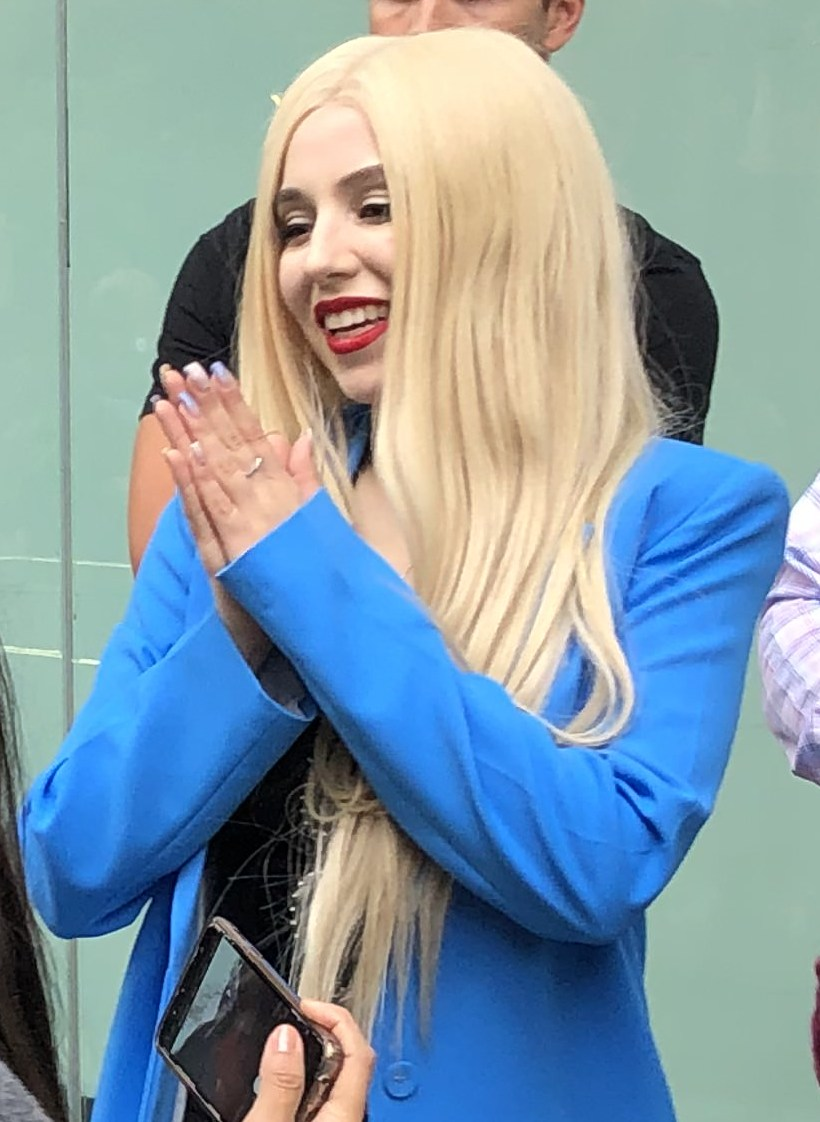
- Max in 2019
Awards and nominations
Award	Wins	Nominations
Attitude Awards	1	1
ASCAP Pop Music Awards	2	2
BMI London Music Awards	2	2
BMI Pop Music Awards	3	3
Bravo Otto Awards	1	1
BreakTudo Awards	1	7
DeGira Awards	0	1
Electronic Dance Music Awards	1	4
Gaffa Awards (Denmark)	0	2
Gaffa Awards (Sweden)	0	3
Global Awards	0	1
Hit FM Music Awards	0	2
Hungarian Music Awards	3	13
iHeartRadio Music Awards	0	1
iHeartRadio Titanium Awards	2	2
Joox Malaysia Top Music Awards	1	2
Los 40 Music Awards	4	7
MTV Europe Music Awards	1	3
MTV Video Music Awards	0	2
NRJ Music Award	0	6
Official Charts Company	1	1
People's Choice Awards	0	2
Premios Odeón	0	1
Spellemannprisen	1	2
Spotify Awards	0	1
Spotify Plaques	3	3
Swiss Music Awards	1	2
Teen Choice Awards	0	2
The Official Big Top 40	1	1
Top Hit Music Awards	1	1
Tudo Information	0	1
WOWIE Awards	0	1
YouTube Creator Awards	2	2

Totals (Note: Certain award groups do not simply award one winner. They acknowledge several different recipients, have runners-up, and have third place. Since this is a specific recognition and is different from losing an award, runner-up mentions are considered wins in this award tally. For simplification and to avoid errors, each award in this list has been presumed to have had a prior nomination.)
- Wins: 33
- Nominations: 98

American singer and songwriter Ava Max has received numerous awards and nominations since her international breakthrough with the release of "Sweet but Psycho" in 2018. Max is the recipient of one Attitude Award, one iHeartRadio Titanium Award, four Los 40 Music Awards, one MTV Europe Music Award, one Swiss Music Award and one TopHit Music Award. Her debut studio album, Heaven & Hell, was released by Atlantic in September 2020. The record was preceded by eight singles, including "Sweet but Psycho", which won the award for the Best International Song at the 2019 Los 40 Music Awards, which received nominations for the Best International Video at the 2020 Los 40 Music Awards and for the International Song of the Year at the 2020 NRJ Music Award.

== Awards and nominations ==
List of awards and nominations received by Ava Max
Award	Year (Note: Indicates the year of ceremony. Each year is linked to the article about the awards held that year, wherever possible.)	Recipient(s)	Category	Result	Ref.
Attitude Awards	2019	Herself	Breakthrough Award	Won	
ASCAP Pop Music Awards	2020	"Sweet but Psycho"	Winning Song	Won	
ASCAP Pop Music Awards	2021	"Kings & Queens"	Winning Song	Won	
BMI London Music Awards	2021	"Kings & Queens"	Winning Song	Won	
BMI London Music Awards	2022	"My Head & My Heart"	Winning Song	Won	
BMI Pop Music Awards	2020	"Sweet but Psycho"	Winning Song	Won	
BMI Pop Music Awards	2022	"Kings & Queens"	Most-Performed Songs of the Year	Won	
BMI Pop Music Awards	2022	"My Head & My Heart"	Most-Performed Songs of the Year	Won	
Bravo Otto Awards	2019	Herself	Newcomer	Silver	
BreakTudo Awards	2019	Herself	Best New International Artist	Nominated	
BreakTudo Awards	2020	Herself	Best Rising Artist	Won	
BreakTudo Awards	2021	"Into Your Arms" (with Witt Lowry)	Hymn of the Year	Nominated	
BreakTudo Awards	2022	Herself	Global Artist	Nominated	
BreakTudo Awards	2022	"The Motto" (with Tiësto)	International Collaboration	Nominated	
BreakTudo Awards	2023	"Car Keys (Ayla)" (with Alok)	International Collaboration	Nominated	
BreakTudo Awards	2023	Herself (Avatars)	International Fandom of the Year	Nominated	
BreakTudo Awards	2025	"Lovin Myself"	International Music Video of the Year	Nominated	
DeGira Awards	2020	Herself	Best New International Artist	Nominated	
Electronic Dance Music Awards	2022	"The Motto" (with Tiësto)	Dance/Electro Pop Song of the Year	Won	
Electronic Dance Music Awards	2022	"The Motto" (with Tiësto)	Dance Radio Song of the Year	Nominated	
Electronic Dance Music Awards	2025	"Forever Young" (with David Guetta)	Best Use of Sample	Nominated	
Electronic Dance Music Awards	2025	Herself	Vocalist of the Year	Nominated	
Gaffa Awards (Denmark)	2021	Herself	New International Name of the Year	Nominated	
Gaffa Awards (Denmark)	2025	"Whatever" (with Kygo)	International Hit of the Year	Nominated	
Gaffa Awards (Sweden)	2019	Herself	International Breakthrough of the Year	Nominated	
Gaffa Awards (Sweden)	2019	"Sweet but Psycho"	International Song of the Year	Nominated	
Gaffa Awards (Sweden)	2021	Herself	International Solo Artist of the Year	Nominated	
Global Awards	2019	Herself	Rising Star Award	Nominated	
Hit FM Music Awards	2020	Herself	New Artist of the Year	Nominated	
Hit FM Music Awards	2020	"Sweet but Psycho"	Party Anthem of the Year	Nominated	
Hungarian Music Awards	2020	"Freaking Me Out"	Foreign Modern Pop Rock Album/Recording of the Year	Nominated	
Hungarian Music Awards	2020	"Torn"	Foreign Modern Pop Rock Album/Recording of the Year	Nominated	
Hungarian Music Awards	2020	"Sweet But Psycho"	Foreign Modern Pop Rock Album/Recording of the Year	Nominated	
Hungarian Music Awards	2020	"So Am I"	Foreign Modern Pop Rock Album/Recording of the Year	Nominated	
Hungarian Music Awards	2021	Heaven & Hell	Foreign Modern Pop Rock Album/Recording of the Year	Nominated	
Hungarian Music Awards	2021	"Christmas Without You"	Foreign Modern Pop Rock Album/Recording of the Year	Nominated	
Hungarian Music Awards	2021	"Kings & Queens, Pt. II" (with Lauv & Saweetie)	Foreign Modern Pop Rock Album/Recording of the Year	Nominated	
Hungarian Music Awards	2022	"EveryTime I Cry"	Foreign Modern Pop Rock Album/Recording of the Year	Nominated	
Hungarian Music Awards	2022	"The Motto" (with Tiësto)	Foreign Modern Electro Album/Recording of the Year	Nominated	
Hungarian Music Awards	2023	"Maybe You're The Problem"	Foreign Modern Pop Rock Album/Recording of the Year	Won	
Hungarian Music Awards	2023	"Million Dollar Baby"	Foreign Modern Pop Rock Album/Recording of the Year	Won	
Hungarian Music Awards	2023	"Weapons"	Foreign Modern Pop Rock Album/Recording of the Year	Won	
Hungarian Music Awards	2025	"Forever Young" (with David Guetta)	Foreign Modern Electro Album/Recording of the Year	Nominated	
iHeartRadio Music Awards	2020	Herself	Best New Pop Artist	Nominated	
iHeartRadio Titanium Awards	2020	"Sweet but Psycho"	1 Billion Total Audience Spins on iHeartRadio Stations	Won	
iHeartRadio Titanium Awards	2022	"Kings & Queens"	1 Billion Total Audience Spins on iHeartRadio Stations	Won	
Joox Malaysia Top Music Awards	2020	"Who's Laughing Now"	Top 5 Hits International	Won	
Joox Malaysia Top Music Awards	2021	Herself	Top 5 International Artists	Nominated	
Lo Nuestro Awards	2021	"Tabú" (with Pablo Alborán)	Pop Song of the Year	Nominated	
Lo Nuestro Awards	2021	"Tabú" (with Pablo Alborán)	Pop Collaboration of the Year	Nominated	
Los 40 Music Awards	2019	Herself	Best International New Artist	Nominated	
Los 40 Music Awards	2019	"Sweet but Psycho"	Best International Song	Won	
Los 40 Music Awards	2020	"Kings & Queens"	Best International Video	Nominated	
Los 40 Music Awards	2020	"Tabú" (with Pablo Alborán)	Best Spanish Song	Nominated	
Los 40 Music Awards	2020	"Tabú" (with Pablo Alborán)	Best Spanish Video	Won	
Los 40 Music Awards	2022	Herself	Best International Artist	Won	
Los 40 Music Awards	2022	"Maybe You're the Problem"	Best International Video	Won	
MTV Europe Music Awards	2019	Herself	Best New Act	Nominated	
MTV Europe Music Awards	2019	Herself	Best Push Act	Won	
MTV Europe Music Awards	2022	"The Motto" (with Tiësto)	Best Collaboration	Nominated	
MTV Video Music Awards	2019	Herself	Best New Artist	Nominated	
MTV Video Music Awards	2019	Herself	Push Best New Artist	Nominated	
MusicDaily Awards	2020	Heaven & Hell	Best Female Album	Nominated	
MusicDaily Awards	2020	Herself	Best Female Artist	Nominated	
MusicDaily Awards	2020	Herself	Best New Artist	Nominated	
MusicDaily Awards	2020	"Kings & Queens"	Best Female Song	Nominated	
MusicDaily Awards	2020	"Kings & Queens"	Best Music Video	Nominated	
MusicDaily Awards	2020	"Kings & Queens, Pt. II" (with Lauv & Saweetie)	Best Collaboration	Nominated	
New Music Awards	2021	Herself	AC Female Artist of the Year	Won	
NRJ Music Award	2019	Herself	International Breakthrough Act	Nominated	
NRJ Music Award	2020	Herself	International Female Artist of the Year	Nominated	
NRJ Music Award	2020	"Kings & Queens"	International Song of the Year	Nominated	
NRJ Music Award	2021	Herself	International Female Artist of the Year	Nominated	
NRJ Music Award	2022	Herself	International Female Artist of the Year	Nominated	
NRJ Music Award	2024	"Whatever" (with Kygo)	International Collaboration of the Year	Nominated	
Official Charts Company	2018	"Sweet but Psycho"	Number 1 Award	Won	
P3 Gold Awards	2024	"Whatever" (with Kygo)	Song of the Year	Nominated	
People's Choice Awards	2020	Herself	New Artist of the Year	Nominated	
People's Choice Awards	2020	"On Me" (with Thomas Rhett & Kane Brown)	Soundtrack Song of the Year	Nominated	
Premios Odeón	2021	"Tabú" (with Pablo Alborán)	Best Pop Song	Nominated	
Qmusic Top 40 Awards	2020	Herself	Best International Artist	Nominated	
Qmusic Top 40 Awards	2020	"Alone, Pt. II" (with Alan Walker)	Best International Hit	Nominated	
Qmusic Top 40 Awards	2020	"Kings & Queens"	Best "Alarmschijven"	Nominated	
Spellemannprisen Awards	2020	"Alone, Pt. II" (with Alan Walker)	Song of the Year	Nominated	
Spellemannprisen Awards	2024	"Whatever" (with Kygo)	Song of the Year	Won	
Spotify Awards	2020	Herself	Most-Streamed EDM Female Artist	Nominated	
Spotify Plaques	2021	Billions Club (1,000,000,000 Streams)	"Sweet but Psycho"	Won	
Spotify Plaques	2024	Billions Club (1,000,000,000 Streams)	"Kings & Queens"	Won	
Spotify Plaques	2026	Billions Club (1,000,000,000 Streams)	"The Motto" (with Tiësto)	Won	
Swiss Music Awards	2021	Herself	Best Breaking Act International	Won	
Swiss Music Awards	2021	Herself	Best Solo Act International	Nominated	
Teen Choice Awards	2019	"Sweet but Psycho"	Choice Pop Song	Nominated	
Teen Choice Awards	2019	Herself	Choice Summer Female Artist	Nominated	
The Official Big Top 40	2019	"Sweet but Psycho"	Number 1 Award	Won	
Top Hit Music Awards	2021	"Salt"	Best Female Artist Song	Won	
Tudo Information Awards	2022	"The Motto" (with Tiësto)	Music Video of the Year	Nominated	
WOWIE Awards	2023	Diamonds & Dancefloors	Best Album	Nominated	
YouTube Creator Awards	2019	Herself	Silver Creator Award	Won	
YouTube Creator Awards	2020	Herself	Gold Creator Award	Won	

== Other accolades ==
=== Listicles ===
Name of publisher, year(s) listed, name of list, and placement result
Publisher	Year	Listicle	Recipients	Result	Ref.
Apple Music	2019	Top Global Songs of the Year	"Sweet but Psycho"	30	
Apple Music	2021	The Best Songs of 2021	"My Head & My Heart"	Placed	
Apple Music	2022	Top Global Songs of the Year	"The Motto"	62	
Armada Music	2021	The Top 10 Dance Songs Of 2021	"The Motto"	5	
Billboard	2018	Billboard Pride's May 2018 Playlist	"My Way"	Placed	
Billboard	2018	Billboard Pride's September 2018 Playlist	"Sweet but Psycho"	Placed	
Billboard	2018	Billboard Dance's Ones to Watch	Herself	Placed	
Billboard	2019	The 50 Best Songs of 2019 (so far)	"Sweet but Psycho"	10	
Billboard	2019	The 100 Best Songs of 2019	"Sweet but Psycho"	34	
Billboard	2020	The 100 Best Songs of 2020	"Kings & Queens"	53	
Billboard	2020	The 30 Best Pop Songs of 2020	"Kings & Queens"	Placed	
Billboard	2020	The 25 Best Pop Albums of 2020	Heaven & Hell	Placed	
Billboard	2020	10 Cool New Pop Songs to Get You Through The Week	"Salt - Acoustic"	Placed	
Billboard	2020	10 Cool New Pop Songs to Get You Through The Week	"My Head & My Heart"	Placed	
Billboard	2022	10 Cool New Pop Songs to Get You Through The Week	"Maybe You're The Problem"	Placed	
British GQ	2020	The Best New Christmas Songs of 2020	"Christmas Without You"	9	
Forbes	2021	30 Under 30	Herself	Placed	
Gaffa	2020	The 20 Best Foreign Albums of 2022	Heaven & Hell	19	
Glamour	2020	The 30 Best Albums of 2020	Heaven & Hell	Placed	
Glamour	2020	The 63 Best Songs of 2020 That Made Our Lives a Little Easier	"Naked"	Placed	
Idolator	2020	The Best Albums of 2020	Heaven & Hell	69	
Idolator	2020	The Best Music Videos of 2020	"Kings & Queens"	Placed	
Maxim	2023	Maxim Hot 100 (under "Maxim Cover Squad")	Herself	Placed	
The New York Times	2019	The 54 Best Songs of 2019	"Sweet but Psycho"	5	
Paper Magazine	2019	100 People Taking Over 2019	Herself	Placed	
People	2024	The Best New Holiday Releases	"1 Wish"	7	
PopJustice	2018	The Top 45 Singles of 2018	"Sweet but Psycho"	29	
PopJustice	2020	The Top 45 Singles of 2020	"Kings & Queens, Pt. II"	13	
Rolling Stone	2023	2023's Best Albums So Far	Diamonds & Dancefloors	Placed	
Rolling Stone	2023	The Best and Wildest Fashion Moments at the 2023 Met Gala	Herself	Placed	
Stereogum	2019	The 40 Pop Songs of 2019	"Sweet but Psycho"	38	
Stereogum	2020	The 40 Pop Songs of 2020	"Kings & Queens"	14	
Tidal	2019	Best of Pop 2019	"Sweet but Psycho"	Placed	
Tidal	2019	Best of Spanish Pop 2019	"Tabú"	Placed	
Tidal	2020	Best of Pop 2020	"Kings & Queens"	Placed	
Tidal	2020	Best of Pop 2020	"Salt"	Placed	
Tidal	2021	Best of Dance 2021	"Sad Boy"	Placed	
Tidal	2021	Best of Pop 2021	"EveryTime I Cry"	Placed	
UPROXX	2023	The Most Anticipated Albums of 2023	Diamonds & Dancefloors	Placed	
Vogue	2019	The 34 Best Songs of 2019	"Torn"	Placed	

=== Records and achievements ===
Records and achievements
Year	Record	Record holder	Ref.
2018	Best-performing Female Solo Song in Norway in 2018	"Sweet But Psycho"	
2018	Best-performing Female Solo Song in Sweden in 2018	"Sweet But Psycho"	
2018	Longest-charting Solo Song atop the Finnish Singles Chart in 2018	"Sweet But Psycho"	
2018	Longest-charting Female Solo Song atop the Danish Singles Chart in 2018	"Sweet But Psycho"	
2018	Longest-charting Female Solo Song atop the German Singles Chart in 2018	"Sweet But Psycho"	
2018	Longest-charting Female Solo Song atop the Norwegian Singles Chart in 2018	"Sweet But Psycho"	
2018	Longest-charting Female Solo Song atop the Swedish Singles Chart in 2018	"Sweet But Psycho"	
2019	Best-performing Song in Slovenia in 2019	"Sweet But Psycho"	
2019	Best-performing Song on the Hungarian Airplay Chart in 2019	"Sweet But Psycho"	
2019	Best-performing Female Song on the Hungarian Dance Chart in 2019	"Sweet But Psycho"	
2019	Longest-charting Solo Song atop the Hungarian Airplay Chart in the 2010s	"Sweet But Psycho"	
2019	Longest-charting Female Song atop the Belgian Singles Chart (Flanders) in the 2010s	"Sweet But Psycho"	
2020	Best-performing Female Song on the Dutch Top 40 in 2020	"Alone, Pt. II'	
2020	Most-played Artist on Polish Radios in 2020	Herself	
2020	Longest-charting Female Song atop the Czech Airplay Chart in 2020	"Kings & Queens"	
2020	Longest-charting Female Song atop the Billboard Adult Top 40 in 2020	"Kings & Queens"	
2021	Best-performing Female Song on the Hungarian Dance Chart in 2021	"My Head & My Heart"	
2021	Best-performing Female Solo Song on the Hungarian Airplay Chart in 2021	"My Head & My Heart"	
2021	Best-performing Female Solo Song on the Billboard Adult Contemporary Chart in 2021	"Kings & Queens"	
2022	Best-performing Female Song on the Dutch Top 40 in 2022	"The Motto"	
2024	Female Artist With the Most Songs on the Hungarian Dance Year-End Chart in 2024	Herself (6 songs)	
2024	Best-performing Female Song on the Hungarian Airplay Chart in 2024	"Car Keys (Ayla)"	
2025	Female Artist With the Most #1 Songs on the Hungarian Airplay Chart in the 2020s	Herself (6 songs)	
2025	Female Artist With the Most Weeks atop the Hungarian Airplay Chart in the 2020s	Herself (18 weeks)	
