= Car Keys (Ayla) =

Single by Alok and Ava Max
- Released: 30 June 2023
- Genre: Slap house; EDM; electronic
- Length: 2:27
- Label: Sony
- Composers: Fridolin Walcher; Henry Walter; Ingo Kunzi; Oliver Heldens
- Lyricists: Amanda Ava Koci; Janée Bennett; Madison Love; Rachel Keen
- Producers: Alok; Cirkut; Kilian & Jo; OHYES; Oliver Heldens

Alok singles chronology
"2 Much 2 Handle" (2023)	"Car Keys (Ayla)" (2023)	"Drum Machine" (2023)

Ava Max singles chronology
"Ghost" (2023)	"Car Keys (Ayla)" (2023)	"Choose Your Fighter" (2023)

Music video
- "Car Keys (Ayla)" on YouTube

"Car Keys (Ayla)" is a song by Brazilian DJ Alok and American singer Ava Max. It was released on 30 June 2023 through Sony.

== Background ==
On 24 April 2023, English musician Jin Jin posted a photo of a Zoom call containing Ava Max, English singer-songwriter Raye and Brazilian DJ Alok. On 11 May, Max and Alok started following each other on Instagram, hinting at a possible collaboration. Alok teased the song at multiple live shows as well as on his Instagram stories. On 20 June, a snippet of the song leaked. The song features a prominent sample of the trance song "Ayla" (1996) by German DJ Ayla.

Speaking about the collaboration, Alok said, "Ava is someone I've wanted to work with for a long time and I couldn't be happier with the experience and the result", sharing his excitement for the world to hear the song. Max added that it was a "great experience collaborating with Alok". She further spoke positively of "the process of creating the music", including the songwriting and video shoot.

== Music video ==
An accompanying music video was filmed in Hamburg and São Paulo and released on July 19, 2023.

== Credits and personnel ==
Credits are adapted from Tidal and Spotify.

- Alok Petrillo – producer
- Amanda Ava Koci – vocals, songwriter
- Fridolin Walcher – songwriter, producer
- Henry Walter – songwriter, producer
- Ingo Kunzi – songwriter
- Janée Bennett – songwriter
- Madison Love – songwriter
- Oliver Heldens – songwriter, producer
- Rachel Keen – songwriter
- Johannes Burger – producer
- Kilian Wilke – producer
- OHYES – producer
- Tom Norris – mix engineer

== Charts ==
=== Weekly charts ===
Weekly chart performance for "Car Keys (Ayla)"
Chart (2023–2026)	Peak position
Belarus Airplay (TopHit)	44
Belgium (Ultratop 50 Flanders)	48
Bulgaria Airplay (PROPHON)	5
Canada CHR/Top 40 (Billboard)	47
CIS Airplay (TopHit)	30
Croatia International Airplay (Top lista)	3
Czech Republic Airplay (ČNS IFPI)	29
Estonia Airplay (TopHit)	28
Germany Airplay (BVMI)	30
Germany Download (Official German Charts)	30
Hungary (Dance Top 40)	1
Hungary (Rádiós Top 40)	1
Kazakhstan Airplay (TopHit)	47
Latvia Airplay (TopHit)	3
Lithuania Airplay (TopHit)	37
Moldova Airplay (TopHit)	43
Netherlands (Dutch Top 40)	10
Netherlands (Single Top 100)	37
New Zealand Hot Singles (RMNZ)	34
Nicaragua Anglo (Monitor Latino)	8
Poland (Polish Airplay Top 100)	6
Romania Airplay (TopHit)	87
Russia Airplay (TopHit)	35
San Marino (SMRRTV Top 50)	48
Slovakia Airplay (ČNS IFPI)	51
South Korea BGM (Circle)	84
Sweden (Sverigetopplistan)	76
Ukraine Airplay (TopHit)	126
UK Singles Downloads (OCC)	91
UK Singles Sales (OCC)	95
US Hot Dance/Electronic Songs (Billboard)	26

=== Monthly charts ===
Monthly chart performance for "Car Keys (Ayla)"
Chart (2023)	Peak position
Belarus Airplay (TopHit)	48
CIS Airplay (TopHit)	36
Estonia Airplay (TopHit)	36
Kazakhstan Airplay (TopHit)	47
Latvia Airplay (TopHit)	5
Lithuania Airplay (TopHit)	37
Romania Airplay (TopHit)	95
Russia Airplay (TopHit)	44

=== Year-end charts ===
2023 year-end chart performance for "Car Keys (Ayla)"
Chart (2023)	Position
Belarus Airplay (TopHit)	162
CIS Airplay (TopHit)	120
Estonia Airplay (TopHit)	144
Hungary (Dance Top 40)	29
Hungary (Rádiós Top 40)	63
Latvia Airplay (TopHit)	57
Lithuania Airplay (TopHit)	90
Netherlands (Dutch Top 40)	34
Poland (Polish Airplay Top 100)	65
Russia Airplay (TopHit)	152

2024 year-end chart performance for "Car Keys (Ayla)"
Chart (2024)	Position
Hungary (Dance Top 40)	4
Hungary (Rádiós Top 40)	3

2025 year-end chart performance for "Car Keys (Ayla)"
Chart (2025)	Position
Hungary (Dance Top 40)	8
Hungary (Rádiós Top 40)	28

== Certifications ==
Certifications and sales for "Car Keys (Ayla)"
Region	Certification	Certified units/sales
Brazil (Pro-Música Brasil)	Platinum	40,000^{‡}
Hungary (MAHASZ)	Gold	2,000^{‡}
Poland (ZPAV)	Platinum	50,000^{‡}
^{‡} Sales+streaming figures based on certification alone.
