= So Am I (Ava Max song) =

2019 single by Ava Max

Single by Ava Max
- Released: March 7, 2019
- Genre: Electropop
- Length: 3:04
- Label: Atlantic
- Songwriters: Amanda Ava Koci; Henry Walter; Charlie Puth; Maria Jane Smith; Victor Thell; Gigi Grombacher; Roland Spreckley
- Producer: Cirkut

Ava Max singles chronology
"Make Up" (2018)	"So Am I" (2019)	"Freaking Me Out" (2019)

Alternative cover
- NCT 127 remix cover

NCT 127 singles chronology
"Superhuman" (2019)	"So Am I" (2019)	"Highway to Heaven" (2019)

Music video
- "So Am I" on YouTube

"So Am I" is a song by American singer and songwriter Ava Max, released on March 7, 2019, through Atlantic Records as a single. It was later included on her debut studio album, Heaven & Hell (2020). The song was written by Max, Charlie Puth, Maria Jane Smith, Victor Thell, Gigi Grombacher, Roland Spreckley, and the producer Cirkut. It is an electropop song which discusses the importance of self-love, being an outcast and not fitting into society. A remixed version of the song featuring South Korean boy band NCT 127 was released on July 3, 2019, with additional rap verses performed in English and Korean.

Upon release, "So Am I" peaked at number 13 on the UK Singles Chart, and at number 14 on the Australian ARIA Singles Chart. It also peaked at number five on the US Billboard Dance Club Songs chart. The song was certified triple platinum in Poland, double platinum in Australia, and received platinum certifications in the United States, Brazil, Canada, Denmark, and Switzerland. The Isaac Rentz-directed music video was released on March 7, 2019, which depicts Max performing in a school with students; the concept was chosen by Max to represent the theme of bullying.

== Background ==
Max teased the release of "So Am I" on Twitter for several weeks, encouraging fans to share pictures of themselves to "show the world what makes you different" using the hashtag #SoAmI. The song was released for digital download and streaming on March 7, 2019, and on contemporary radio stations in the United States on June 25, 2019. It was co-written by Max, Charlie Puth, Maria Jane Smith, Victor Thell, Gigi Grombacher, Roland Spreckley, and the producer Cirkut.

A remix featuring South Korean boy band NCT 127 was announced by Max on July 2, 2019, with the official cover art, which resembled a high school yearbook. It was released on July 3, 2019. Mark and Taeyong perform new life-affirming rap verses in English and Korean halfway through the song before Jaehyun accompanies Max during the chorus. Both the former and Doyoung also perform backing vocals throughout the remix.

== Composition ==
"So Am I" is an electropop song, described as an "inspirational, self-acceptance anthem". According to the song's sheet music that was published on Musicnotes.com, it is set in the time signature of 4/4 common time, with a tempo of 130 beats per minute, while composed in the key of G-flat major. Max's voice on the track ranges from the low note of G♭_{3} to the high note of E♭_{5}, while the song is constructed in verse–chorus form. The song was recorded in pieces over several days. According to Max, the lyrics are about "loving yourself, being different, being an outcast and not fitting in the format that society wants to put us in".

== Critical reception ==
Michael Silva of Billboard described the song as a "bouncy, pop-heavy anthem" with lyrics about "navigating your adolescent years". Markos Papadatos of Digital Journal described Max's vocals as "crisp, soothing and expressive" and praised the song's production which has "infectious hooks and a catchy beat to it that will inspire listeners to get up and dance along". He concluded by comparing the song's "message of hope and optimism" to her 2018 song "Sweet but Psycho". Writing for The Guardian, Michael Cragg described "So Am I" as an "I'm weird me" outcast anthem, while Helena Wadia of Evening Standard criticized the song as "lack[ing] nuance", despite being "a rousing anthem after a few listens".

Writing about the song's remix, Madeline Roth of MTV News praised the guest appearance of NCT 127, stating that "they lend more empowering, feel-good vibes with a fresh verse about appreciating someone who owns their originality".

== Commercial performance ==
"So Am I" debuted on the UK Singles Chart at number 50 on the chart issued March 21, 2019. The song peaked at number 13 on April 26, 2019, after spending 16 weeks on the chart. It was eventually certified platinum by the British Phonographic Industry (BPI) on January 1, 2021, for selling 600,000 equivalent units in sales. The track topped the Polish Airplay Top 100 chart, where it received a triple platinum certification on January 13, 2021. The song peaked at number two in Norway, where it charted for 18 weeks. "So Am I" charted at number five in Scotland, spending 16 total weeks on the chart. In Finland, the song bowed at number eight, while it was certified platinum in Switzerland and Denmark, bowing in the top 20 in both countries.

"So Am I" reached number five on the US Dance Club Songs issue dated July 6, 2019, before receiving a platinum certification by the Recording Industry Association of America (RIAA) on July 6, 2022, for selling 1,000,000 equivalent units in the US. In Canada, it received a platinum certification by Music Canada (MC) for selling 80,000 equivalent sales units. In Australia, "So Am I" debuted at number 29 on the ARIA Singles Chart on April 7, 2019. The song peaked at number 14 on the chart dated May 5, 2019, and spent 13 weeks on the chart. It was certified double platinum by the Australian Recording Industry Association (ARIA) for selling over 140,000 units in Australia.

== Music video ==
=== Background and reception ===
The Isaac Rentz-directed music video was simultaneously released with the song and was uploaded on YouTube on March 7, 2019. Max described the video's setting: "I actually filmed it in a school because of the bullying that goes on. It starts in school. That’s where a lot of people get hurt from it all. I wanted the storyline to focus on all the outcasts and all that diversity to show that we are all one in unity. It’s okay to be different. In general, I think society wants to put us in a format and I don’t think we should be fitting into it. We should do our own thing." She also acknowledged that she was bullied during the seventh grade, consequently retaliating against the bully and was kicked out. Issei Honke of Billboard Japan compared it to the music video of Britney Spears' 1998 song "...Baby One More Time", which he stated that both artists showcased their personality while dancing on a school stage in uniform. As of February 2023, the music video has over 250 million views on YouTube. A second fanmade music video was also released on June 12, 2019, which consisted of 15 German fans who were personally selected by Max from the #SoAmIFanVideo challenge. The music video was filmed inside YouTube Space Berlin.

=== Synopsis ===
The music video was compared to Britney Spears' music video for her 1998 song, "...Baby One More Time", as both artists showcase their personality at a school in uniform.

The video begins with Max walking down a school corridor, wearing a black & red striped shirt, along with a black dress. As she opens a locker, she begins singing while beginning to walk down the hallway, while students begin entering their designated classrooms. She performs a dance alongside two girls wearing Catholic school uniform, before performing a choreographed dance routine in the playground with 6 other school students while wearing a white shirt. Various shots of students are interspersed throughout the routine.

Max is then shown sitting on top of the teacher's desk, as the word 'Detention' is written on the blackboard. The students stare at each other while she dances around them. In the next segment, Max performs a dance in a black blazer on top of a red shirt inside a football stadium with multiple students. She is then seen wearing red Beats by Dre headphones while standing next to a wall. The final segment shows Max walking onto the field with the students, as they socialize with each other while sitting down. She performs a belt on the field, as the students stand in a horizontal line, holding up their right hand under their mouth with the words 'So Am I' written in black ink. At the end of the line, Max places her right hand over her forehead and she falls backwards.

== Live performances ==
Max performed "So Am I" in a medley with "Sweet but Psycho" on Seven Network's breakfast television show Sunrise on April 29, 2019, which was her debut televised performance in Australia. She additionally performed the song in a medley with "Sweet but Psycho" and "Salt" (2019) at Wango Tango on June 1, 2019. Her attire consisted of a Zemeta purple and green long-sleeved outfit, accompanied with black leather pants, silver Steve Madden stiletto boots, and an iridescent Avec Les Filles trenchcoat. Max appeared on the sixth-season finale of The Voice van Vlaanderen to perform "So Am I" in a medley with "Sweet but Psycho" on May 17, 2019. During the 2019 Summertime Ball hosted by Capital FM on June 8, she performed "So Am I" in a medley with "Sweet but Psycho". On August 5, 2019, Max performed the song on Jimmy Kimmel Live! while wearing a matching blue PVC pair consisting of a trench coat and high-waist pants. She also sported a silver crop top and platform shoes, the latter which had a black laces in the front and three buckle straps near the calves. Max performed "So Am I" at the 2019 Jingle Bell Ball on December 7, which was included in a medley with "Sweet but Psycho" and "Torn" (2019), performing with other artists such as The Script, Rita Ora, Regard and Mabel.

== Track listing ==
Digital download / streaming

1. "So Am I" – 3:04

Digital download / streaming – NCT 127 remix

1. "So Am I" (NCT 127 Remix) – 3:05

Digital download / streaming – Majestic remix

1. "So Am I" (Majestic Remix) – 4:21

Digital download / streaming – Deepend remix

1. "So Am I" (Deepend Remix) – 2:42

Digital download / streaming – Jengi remix

1. "So Am I" (Jengi Remix) – 2:52

Digital download / streaming – Toby Green remix

1. "So Am I" (Toby Green Remix) – 2:46

Digital download / streaming – Steve Void remix

1. "So Am I" (Steve Void Remix) – 3:07

Digital download / streaming – Martin Jensen remix

1. "So Am I" (Martin Jensen Remix) – 3:24

Digital download / streaming – Zane Lowe remix

1. "So Am I" (Zane Lowe Remix) – 3:58

Spotify streaming

1. "So Am I" – 3:03
2. "Sweet but Psycho" – 3: 07

== Credits and personnel ==
Credits adapted from Tidal.

- Amanda Ava Koci – vocals, songwriting
- Henry Walter – songwriting, production, programming, instruments
- Maria Jane Smith – songwriting
- Victor Thell – songwriting
- Martin Sue – songwriting (Note: Martin Sue is credited as a writer on streaming services but ASCAP lists Puth as a writer instead.)
- Gigi Grombacher – songwriting
- Roland Spreckley – songwriting
- Itai Schwartz – engineering

== Charts ==
=== Weekly charts ===
Weekly chart performance for "So Am I"
Chart (2019-2020)	Peak position
Australia (ARIA)	14
Austria (Ö3 Austria Top 40)	26
Belgium (Ultratop 50 Flanders)	13
Belgium (Ultratop 50 Wallonia)	40
Bolivia Anglo (Monitor Latino)	5
China Airplay/FL (Billboard)	9
Czech Republic Airplay (ČNS IFPI)	2
Czech Republic Singles Digital (ČNS IFPI)	38
Denmark (Tracklisten)	16
Estonia (Eesti Tipp-40)	18
Euro Digital Song Sales (Billboard)	8
Finland (Suomen virallinen lista)	8
France (SNEP)	58
Germany (GfK)	21
Germany Airplay (BVMI)	1
Greece (IFPI)	41
Hungary (Dance Top 40)	14
Hungary (Rádiós Top 40)	16
Hungary (Single Top 40)	9
Hungary (Stream Top 40)	18
Iceland (Tónlistinn)	11
Ireland (IRMA)	13
Lebanon (OLT20 English Chart)	18
Lithuania (AGATA)	23
Luxembourg Digital Songs (Billboard)	6
Malaysia (RIM)	14
Mexico Airplay (Billboard)	13
Netherlands (Dutch Top 40)	10
Netherlands (Single Top 100)	23
New Zealand (Recorded Music NZ)	23
Norway (VG-lista)	2
Poland Airplay (ZPAV)	1
Portugal (AFP)	74
Romania (Airplay 100)	69
Russia Airplay (TopHit)	36
Scottish Singles Sales (Official Charts)	5
Singapore (RIAS)	20
Slovakia Airplay (ČNS IFPI)	2
Slovakia Singles Digital (ČNS IFPI)	38
Slovenia (SloTop50)	6
South Korea BGM (Circle)	45
Sweden (Sverigetopplistan)	16
Switzerland (Schweizer Hitparade)	18
Ukraine Airplay (TopHit)	1
UK Singles (Official Charts)	13
US Dance Club Songs (Billboard)	5
US Pop Airplay (Billboard)	43
Venezuela Anglo (Record Report)	53

=== Year-end charts ===
Year-end chart performance for "So Am I" in 2019
Chart (2019)	Position
Australia (ARIA)	95
Belgium (Ultratop Flanders)	35
CIS (Tophit)	110
Denmark (Tracklisten)	67
France (SNEP)	179
Germany (Official German Charts)	96
Hungary (Dance Top 40)	85
Hungary (Rádiós Top 40)	96
Hungary (Single Top 40)	65
Iceland (Tónlistinn)	49
Netherlands (Dutch Top 40)	39
Netherlands (Single Top 100)	79
Poland (ZPAV)	13
Russia Airplay (Tophit)	160
Slovenia (SloTop50)	14
Sweden (Sverigetopplistan)	78
Switzerland (Schweizer Hitparade)	54
Ukraine Airplay (Tophit)	70
UK Singles (Official Charts Company)	82

Year-end chart performance for "So Am I" in 2020
Chart (2020)	Position
Hungary (Dance Top 40)	33

Year-end chart performance for "So Am I" in 2021
Chart (2021)	Position
Hungary (Dance Top 40)	92

== Certifications ==
Certifications and sales for "So Am I"
Region	Certification	Certified units/sales
Australia (ARIA)	2× Platinum	140,000^{‡}
Austria (IFPI Austria)	Platinum	30,000^{‡}
Belgium (BRMA)	Gold	20,000^{‡}
Brazil (Pro-Música Brasil)	2× Platinum	80,000^{‡}
Canada (Music Canada)	Platinum	80,000^{‡}
Denmark (IFPI Danmark)	Platinum	90,000^{‡}
France (SNEP)	Platinum	200,000^{‡}
Germany (BVMI)	Gold	200,000^{‡}
Italy (FIMI)	Gold	35,000^{‡}
New Zealand (RMNZ)	Platinum	30,000^{‡}
Norway (IFPI Norway)	3× Platinum	180,000^{‡}
Poland (ZPAV)	4× Platinum	80,000^{‡}
Portugal (AFP)	Gold	5,000^{‡}
Spain (Promusicae)	Gold	30,000^{‡}
Switzerland (IFPI Switzerland)	Platinum	20,000^{‡}
United Kingdom (BPI)	Platinum	600,000^{‡}
United States (RIAA)	Platinum	1,000,000^{‡}
^{‡} Sales+streaming figures based on certification alone.

== Release history ==
Release dates and formats for "So Am I"
Region	Date	Format(s)	Version	Label(s)	Ref.
Various	March 7, 2019	Digital download; streaming	Original	Atlantic	
Various	April 18, 2019	Digital download; streaming	Majestic remix	Atlantic	
Various	April 25, 2019	Digital download; streaming	Deepend remix	Atlantic	
Various	May 9, 2019	Digital download; streaming	Jengi remix	Atlantic	
Various	May 23, 2019	Digital download; streaming	Toby Green remix	Atlantic	
Italy	May 24, 2019	Radio airplay	Original	Warner	
Various	June 6, 2019	Digital download; streaming	Steve Void Dance remix	Atlantic	
Canada	June 19, 2019	Contemporary hit radio	Original	Atlantic	
United States	June 25, 2019	Contemporary hit radio	Original	Atlantic	
Various	June 27, 2019	Digital download; streaming	Martin Jensen remix	Atlantic	
Various	July 3, 2019	Digital download; streaming	NCT 127 remix	Atlantic	
Various	July 25, 2019	Digital download; streaming	Zane Lowe remix	Atlantic	
