= Ghost (Ava Max song) =

- Merk & Kremont remix cover

Single by Ava Max

from the album Diamonds & Dancefloors
- Released: March 16, 2023
- Genre: Synth-pop
- Length: 3:01
- Label: Atlantic
- Songwriters: Amanda Ava Koci; Henry Walter; Uzoechi Emenike
- Producer: Cirkut

Ava Max singles chronology
| "One of Us" (2023) | "Ghost" (2023) | "Car Keys (Ayla)" (2023) |

Visualizer video
- "Ghost" on YouTube

"Ghost" is a song by American singer-songwriter Ava Max from her second studio album, Diamonds & Dancefloors. The song was written by Max, MNEK and its producer Cirkut. It was released through Atlantic Records as the sixth and final single from the album on March 16, 2023. The song received positive reviews from critics, with critics highlighting it a standout on the album, with much praise going towards the house production and Max's vocal performance. A remix by Merk & Kremont was released on May 12, 2023.

== Background and composition ==
On December 30, 2022, Max teased a visualizer for the song through TikTok; the full visualizer was then released on YouTube on March 16, 2023. It was written by Max, MNEK and its producer Cirkut. In an interview with Travis Mills, Max revealed that the three wrote the song in approximately 30 minutes in a Zoom meeting.

"Ghost" is a synth-pop song with elements of house music from the 90s.

== Credits and personnel ==
Credits adapted from Tidal.

- Amanda Ava Koci – vocals, songwriting
- Henry Walter – songwriting, production, programming
- Uzoechi Emenike – songwriting
- Chris Gehringer – mastering
- Serban Ghenea – mixer
- Bryce Bordone – mix engineer assistant

== Charts ==
=== Weekly charts ===
Weekly chart performance
| Chart (2023) | Peak position |
|---|---|
| Finland Airplay (Suomen virallinen lista) | 6 |
| Guatemala Anglo (Monitor Latino) | 30 |
| New Zealand Hot Singles (RMNZ) | 27 |
| Nicaragua Anglo (Monitor Latino) | 7 |
| Panama Anglo (Monitor Latino) | 13 |
| Russia Airplay (TopHit) | 100 |
| US Hot Dance/Electronic Songs (Billboard) | 12 |
| Venezuela Anglo (Monitor Latino) | 7 |

=== Year-end charts ===
Year-end chart performance
| Chart (2023) | Position |
|---|---|
| US Hot Dance/Electronic Songs (Billboard) | 68 |
