= One of Us (Ava Max song) =

Single by Ava Max

from the album Diamonds & Dancefloors
- Released: January 12, 2023
- Genre: Disco; dance
- Length: 2:58
- Label: Atlantic
- Songwriters: Amanda Ava Koci; Brett McLaughlin; Caroline Ailin; Henry Walter; Matthew Burns
- Producers: Burns; Cirkut

Ava Max singles chronology
"Dancing's Done" (2022)	"One of Us" (2023)	"Ghost" (2023)

Visualizer
- "One of Us" on YouTube

"One of Us" is a song by American singer-songwriter Ava Max, released on January 12, 2023, through Atlantic Records as the fifth single from her second studio album, Diamonds & Dancefloors (2023). A visualiser for the song was released on January 27, 2023. The song was also sent to Italian contemporary hit radio on April 14, 2023. The song received positive reviews from critics, with many critics praising the ballad influences, Max's vocal performance, production and lyricism.

== Background ==
On January 10, 2023, Max announced "One of Us" through her social media, where she uploaded a snippet of a music video for the song and revealed its release date. The song was subsequently released two days later. It was written by Max, Caroline Ailin, Leland, Burns, and Cirkut, and produced by the two latter. The official visualizer was released on January 27, 2023, with the rest of the album.

== Charts ==
=== Weekly charts ===
Chart performance
Chart (2023–2026)	Peak position
Austria Airplay (IFPI Austria)	4
Bolivia Anglo (Monitor Latino)	8
El Salvador Anglo (Monitor Latino)	16
Germany Airplay (BVMI)	24
Hungary (Dance Top 40)	8
Hungary (Rádiós Top 40)	7
Hungary (Single Top 40)	8
New Zealand Hot Singles (RMNZ)	32
South Korea BGM (Circle)	92
Uruguay Anglo (Monitor Latino)	14
US Hot Dance/Electronic Songs (Billboard)	13

=== Year-end charts ===
2023 year-end chart performance
Chart (2023)	Position
Hungary (Dance Top 40)	67
Hungary (Rádiós Top 40)	16

2024 year-end chart performance
Chart (2024)	Position
Hungary (Dance Top 40)	32
Hungary (Rádiós Top 40)	38

2025 year-end chart performance
Chart (2025)	Position
Hungary (Dance Top 40)	43

== Release history ==
Release dates and formats
Region	Date	Format	Label	Ref.
Various	January 12, 2023	Digital download; streaming	Atlantic	
Italy	April 14, 2023	Radio airplay	Warner	
