= Dancing's Done =

2022 single by Ava Max

Single by Ava Max

from the album Diamonds & Dancefloors
- Released: December 20, 2022
- Genre: Dance-pop; disco; Eurodance
- Length: 2:46
- Label: Atlantic
- Songwriters: Ava Max; Burns; Pablo Bowman; Cirkut; Lostboy; Sean Douglas
- Producers: Burns; Lostboy

Ava Max singles chronology
"Weapons" (2022)	"Dancing's Done" (2022)	"One of Us" (2023)

Visualizer
- "Dancing's Done" on YouTube

"Dancing's Done" is a song by American singer-songwriter Ava Max from her second studio album, Diamonds & Dancefloors (2023). The song was written by Max, Burns, Pablo Bowman, Cirkut, Lostboy and Sean Douglas, and produced by Burns and Lostboy. It was released as the fourth single from the album for digital download and streaming by Atlantic in various countries on December 20, 2022. A dark-inspired 1980s dance-pop, disco and Eurodance song, the song navigates through the theme of seeking a connection with an individual desiring shared moments.

Following release, it garnered a positive reception from music critics for its music and its evident inspirations from the 1980s. Commercially, it charted within the top 100 in Chile, Croatia, Guatemala, Hungary, Japan and Poland. An accompanying visualizer premiered on Max's YouTube channel on December 22, depicting her within a neutral backdrop lying on a floor adorned with glitter that highlights her red hair.

== Background and composition ==
Atlantic released "Dancing's Done" for digital download and streaming on December 20, 2022 as the fourth single of Max's second studio album, Diamonds & Dancefloors (2023). It is set in the key of C minor with a moderately fast tempo of 112 to 116 beats per minute. The vocal delivery of Max range from the low note of B_{3} to the high note of C_{5}. "Dancing's Done" is a dark-inspired 1980s dance-pop, disco and Eurodance song. The song navigates through the theme of seeking a connection with an individual desiring shared moments, alluding to the various possibilities that arise at the conclusion of the night. In its chorus, Max sings, "I wanna give into your dark temptation, I wanna touch you like nobody does, oh, People like you and me were born to run, So where we going when the dancing's done?"

== Reception and promotion ==
Following release, "Dancing's Done" garnered a positive reception from music critics. Shaad D'Souza from Paper observed Max venturing into a "darker" realm, with "squiggly synth lines" imbuing the song with an atmosphere suggestive of "the arcane and the mystical". Sam Franzini for The Line of Best Fit pointed out resonances with the "darkness and intensity" reminiscent of Swedish group ABBA's song "Lay All Your Love On Me" (1981). Jordi Bardají of Jenesaispop characterized the song as another "dance tribute" to the 1980s, complimenting its "bulletproof" chorus. Sebas E. Alonso from the aforementioned outlet underscored that the nod to American singer Britney Spears in the lyrics "if you’re not there" aligns with a production evocative of the 1980s influences seen in the works of American singer Lady Gaga and English-Albanian singer Dua Lipa.

Commercially, "Dancing's Done" charted at number two in Guatemala, number seven in Chile and within the top 100 in Croatia, Hungary and Poland. On January 11, 2023, the song reached number 7 on the Japanese Billboard Hot Overseas ranking. Intended for further promotion, an official visualizer for "Dancing's Done" premiered to Max's official YouTube channel on December 22, 2022. The visual presents Max lying on the floor adorned with glitter that complements her luminous attire, creating a visual contrast that highlights her red hair against an entirely neutral backdrop.

== Credits and personnel ==
Credits adapted from Spotify.

- Ava Max (Amanda Ava Koci) – lead artist, songwriting
- Burns (Matthew Burns) – producing, songwriting
- Pablo Bowman – songwriting
- Cirkut (Henry Walter) – songwriting
- Lostboy (Peter Rycroft) – producing, songwriting
- Sean Douglas – songwriting

== Charts ==
Chart performance
Chart (2022–2023)	Peak position
Chile Anglo (Monitor Latino)	7
CIS Airplay (TopHit)	111
Croatia International Airplay (Top lista)	60
Estonia Airplay (TopHit)	153
Guatemala Anglo (Monitor Latino)	2
Hungary (Single Top 40)	35
Japan Hot Overseas (Billboard Japan)	7
Latvia Airplay (TopHit)	101
Lithuania Airplay (TopHit)	136
New Zealand Hot Singles (RMNZ)	21
Poland (Polish Airplay Top 100)	30
Romania Airplay (TopHit)	179
Russia Airplay (TopHit)	108
San Marino (SMRRTV Top 50)	28
South Korea BGM (Circle)	43
Sweden Heatseeker (Sverigetopplistan)	2

== Certifications ==
Certifications
Region	Certification	Certified units/sales
Poland (ZPAV)	Gold	25,000^{‡}
^{‡} Sales+streaming figures based on certification alone.

== Release history ==
Release dates and formats
Region	Date	Format	Label	Ref.
Various	December 20, 2022	Digital download; streaming	Atlantic	
Italy	January 6, 2023	Radio airplay	Warner	
