= EveryTime I Cry =

2021 single by Ava Max

Single by Ava Max
- Released: June 8, 2021
- Genre: House; electropop
- Length: 2:57
- Label: Atlantic
- Songwriters: Amanda Ava Koci; Caroline Pennell; Lauren Aquilina; Sean Myer; Henry Walter
- Producers: Cirkut; Sean Myer

Ava Max singles chronology
"My Head & My Heart" (2020)	"EveryTime I Cry" (2021)	"Sad Boy" (2021)

Music video
- "EveryTime I Cry" on YouTube

"EveryTime I Cry" is a song by American singer-songwriter Ava Max, released on June 8, 2021, through Atlantic Records. The house and electropop song was written by Max, Caroline Pennell, Lauren Aquilina, and producers Cirkut and Sean Myer. It consists of a piano with synthesizers, and lyrics describing the effect of women's empowerment during difficult situations. "EveryTime I Cry" received generally favorable reviews from music critics, who praised the upbeat production. The song peaked at number seven in Poland and at number 99 in the United Kingdom. An accompanying music video was directed by Max and Charlotte Rutherford and depicts the singer on the desert which transforms into a lush landscape with her tears. It was compared to previous music videos by TLC and Shakira.

== Background and release ==
On May 12, 2021, Max uploaded a portion of "EveryTime I Cry" on Twitter. She announced the release date and cover art of the song on June 3, 2021, and stated that it is a "continuation" of her debut studio album, Heaven & Hell (2020). However, she later declared that the song is "a bridge" between Heaven & Hell and her sophomore album, citing the growth of individuals through the difficulties of 2020. "EveryTime I Cry" was released on June 8, 2021, which was accompanied by a lyric video on YouTube. The song was written by Max, Caroline Pennell, Lauren Aquilina, and producers Cirkut and Sean Myer.

== Composition and critical reception ==
"EveryTime I Cry" is a house and electropop song. It opens with synthesizers and uses a piano. The chorus contains house elements and climaxes into a "groovy beat". The lyrics describe the impact of women's empowerment during difficult situations, which consequently allows a person to courageously confront their emotions.

Writing for BroadwayWorld, Sarah Jae Leiber acknowledged that "EveryTime I Cry" is "an undisputed summer smash" and an "adrenaline-fueled track", opining that it is "pure electropop perfection". Carolyn Droke of Uproxx considered the song to be "electrifying". The New York Times writer Jon Caramanica positively compared "EveryTime I Cry" to the discography of Dua Lipa. Shaad D'Souza of Paper described the song as an "undeniably uplifting banger" and positively compared it to Max's 2020 song "My Head & My Heart".

== Commercial performance ==
"EveryTime I Cry" peaked at number seven on the Polish Airplay Top 100 chart dated August 28, 2021. On the Norwegian VG-lista, the song peaked at number 39. In Germany, "EveryTime I Cry" debuted on the Offizielle Deutsche Charts at number 90 on the chart dated August 6, 2021. It peaked at number 58 and remained on the chart for nine weeks. On the UK Singles Chart issued June 18, 2021, the song bowed at the number 99 peak and remained for one week.

== Music video ==
An accompanying music video was released on July 23, 2021, which was directed by Max and Charlotte Rutherford. It depicts Max awakening in an abandoned landscape while appearing injured. She is later seen on top of a tree above a waterfall covered with lily pads, as her tears form an ocean. Uproxx writer Rachel Brodsky compared the visual's computer-generated imagery (CGI) landscapes to the music videos of TLC's 1995 song "Waterfalls" and Shakira's 2001 song "Whenever, Wherever".

== Track listing ==
Digital download / streaming

1. "EveryTime I Cry" – 2:57

Digital download / streaming

1. "EveryTime I Cry" (Pink Panda Remix) – 2:27

Digital download / streaming

1. "EveryTime I Cry" (R3hab Remix) – 3:11

Digital download / streaming

1. "EveryTime I Cry" (Sigala Remix) – 3:36

== Credits and personnel ==
Credits adapted from Tidal.

- Amanda Ava Koci – vocals, songwriting
- Henry Walter – songwriting, production, instruments, programming
- Sean Myer – songwriting, production
- Caroline Pennell – songwriting
- Lauren Aquilina – songwriting
- Chris Gehringer – mastering
- Serban Ghenea – mixing
- John Hanes – engineering

== Charts ==
=== Weekly charts ===
Weekly chart performance for "EveryTime I Cry"
Chart (2021)	Peak position
Belgium (Ultratop 50 Wallonia)	9
Croatia (HRT)	15
CIS Airplay (TopHit)	67
Czech Republic Airplay (ČNS IFPI)	10
Finland Airplay (Radiosoittolista)	20
France (SNEP)	105
Germany (GfK)	58
Hungary (Rádiós Top 40)	4
Hungary (Single Top 40)	37
Mexico Ingles Airplay (Billboard)	23
Netherlands (Dutch Top 40)	22
Netherlands (Single Top 100)	62
New Zealand Hot Singles (RMNZ)	29
Norway (VG-lista)	39
Poland Airplay (ZPAV)	7
San Marino (SMRRTV Top 50)	43
Slovakia Airplay (ČNS IFPI)	4
South Korea BGM (Circle)	58
Sweden (Sverigetopplistan)	55
Switzerland (Schweizer Hitparade)	97
UK Singles (Official Charts)	99

=== Year-end charts ===
Year-end chart performance for "EveryTime I Cry"
Chart (2021)	Position
Belgium (Ultratop Wallonia)	41
Croatia (HRT)	52
Hungary (Rádiós Top 40)	40
Poland (Polish Airplay Top 100)	47

== Certifications ==
Certifications and sales for "EveryTime I Cry"
Region	Certification	Certified units/sales
Austria (IFPI Austria)	Gold	15,000^{‡}
France (SNEP)	Gold	100,000^{‡}
Poland (ZPAV)	Platinum	50,000^{‡}
^{‡} Sales+streaming figures based on certification alone.

== Release history ==
Release dates and formats for "EveryTime I Cry"
Region	Date	Format(s)	Version	Label(s)	Ref.
Various	June 8, 2021	Digital download; streaming	Original	Atlantic	
France	June 9, 2021	Radio airplay	Original	Universal	
Italy	June 11, 2021	Radio airplay	Original	Warner	
Various	July 6, 2021	Digital download; streaming	Pink Panda remix	Atlantic	
Various	July 16, 2021	Digital download; streaming	R3hab remix	Atlantic	
Various	July 30, 2021	Digital download; streaming	Sigala remix	Atlantic	
