= Torn (Ava Max song) =

2019 single by Ava Max

Single by Ava Max
- B-side: "Salt"
- Released: August 19, 2019
- Studio: A Studios, West Hollywood, California
- Genre: Dance; pop
- Length: 3:18
- Label: Atlantic
- Songwriters: Amanda Ava Koci; Madison Love; James Lavigne; Thomas Eriksen; Sam Denison Martin; Henry Walter
- Producer: Cirkut

Ava Max singles chronology
"Slow Dance" (2019)	"Torn" (2019)	"Tabú" (2019)

Alternate cover
- CD single cover

Music video
- "Torn" on YouTube

"Torn" is a song by American singer-songwriter Ava Max, released as a single on August 19, 2019, through Atlantic Records. It was included on her debut studio album Heaven & Hell (2020). The song was written by Max, Madison Love, James Lavigne, Thomas Eriksen, Sam Martin, and the producer Cirkut. It is a dance and pop song with lyrics describing the internal struggle between wanting to stay and leave in a relationship. "Torn" charted in the top 10 in Poland, the Netherlands, Slovakia, and Slovenia. The song was certified double platinum in Poland and was certified gold in five countries.

An accompanying music video was directed by Korean-American director Joseph Kahn and released on August 27, 2019. The superhero-themed video was filmed in Milan for four days. Max portrayed dual identities; a regular woman and a superhero, as she sought revenge on her boyfriend. Max performed "Torn" as a medley in the 2019 MTV Video Music Awards and 2019 MTV Europe Music Awards shows, and at the 2019 Jingle Bell Ball.

== Background and composition ==
Max teased "Torn" in the caption of a video posted on Instagram, asking her fans if they knew the name of the song she was about to release. A pre-order link for "Torn" was discovered, with Max subsequently sharing the cover art and a snippet of the song. "Torn" was released on August 19, 2019. It was written by Max, Madison Love, James Lavigne, Thomas Eriksen, Sam Martin, and the producer Cirkut. The song was recorded in Virginia Beach, and West Hollywood, California in A Studios.

"Torn" is a dance and pop song, which uses elements of disco. The lyrics describe the internal struggle of wanting to leave while also wanting to stay with a lover, which Max stated that the song "explores the struggle" between "love and hate".

== Critical reception and commercial performance ==
Shaad D'Souza of The Fader compared "Torn" to the discography of ABBA. Writing for Us Weekly, Nicholas Hautman noted that it "subtly sample[d]" the group's 1979 song "Gimme! Gimme! Gimme! (A Man After Midnight)". Max responded to the comparisons by stating that she listened to ABBA and Ace of Base during her childhood, and wanted to "add a little disco flair in there". The song was included on Vogue's Best Songs of 2019 listicle, where writer Christian Allaire stated that it "earworms its way into my head at least once a day".

In Poland, "Torn" peaked at number three on the Polish Airplay Top 100 chart dated November 16, 2019, and was certified double platinum by the Polish Airplay Top 100 (ZPAV) for track-equivalent sales of 40,000 units in the country. The song reached number three in the Netherlands, number four in Slovakia, and number nine in Slovenia. On the Scottish Singles Chart issued September 6, 2019, "Torn" bowed at number 18, while the song peaked at number 87 on the UK Singles Chart dated September 13, 2019, where it remained for two weeks. "Torn" was certified gold in Austria, Brazil, France, Italy, and Switzerland.

== Music video ==
=== Background ===
The Joseph Kahn-directed music video was shot in Milan for four days from June to August 2019, and was released on August 27, 2019. It has been considered to be "superhero-themed". Madeline Roth of MTV News described Max's character as a "woman scorned" who "goes undercover as a hero who kicks the shit out of some masked villains — including her shady boyfriend". Roth described the secret identity of Max's character as someone who "endur[ed] a venomous relationship" and survived a betrayal to "fight back". Max explained the process of creating the concept of the video, stating that she perceived the visuals while recording the song and knew exactly what she wanted. She approached Kahn with the idea of creating two personas for an ordinary woman named 'Amanda', and a superhero named 'Ava Max'. Max jokingly asked him to allow her to become a superhero, with the knowledge that it was difficult to accomplish. However, Kahn responded that he "always wanted to do that".

Max performed her own stunts, spending the morning in the second day of the shoot practicing before shooting the video at 1:00am. She is seen wearing various pieces of clothing from Trussardi, including archive items from the Eighties and Nineties, such as glittery pumps with the 'T' logo on the heel, a leather trench coat and a messenger bag with Trussardi's greyhound logo as the closure. Max stated that she "wanted something uniquely Italian with a rich history that was fashion-forward yet elegant. Trussardi was the only option". A model of the Fiat Panda customized by Trussardi is briefly featured in the music video, which a portion was used in commercials. As of March 2023, the video has over 100 million views on YouTube.

=== Synopsis ===
The music video was described as "superhero-themed" by music critics, which represented the duality of Max as a regular woman, and a superhero seeking revenge after a relationship betrayal.

The video begins with a worn-out book opening the page to Chapter One. A brunette woman named Amanda (portrayed by Ava Max) is seen arguing with her boyfriend across the dining table, as he storms out to his car and drives off in the rain. Amanda then transforms into her superhero costume inside the mansion, consisting of a red cape, silver pants and signature blonde hair, half cut on her right side. In Chapter Two, several masked thugs commit a store robbery and make their getaway in a red sports car. Amanda confronts them in the middle of the highway and proceeds to overpower them, as comic-style text appears after each blow. Back at the mansion, news of the incident is broadcast, as her boyfriend watches on the couch. Back in her brunette hair, Amanda furiously scrubs the dishes as sparks appear from her hands, eventually cracking them in half.

The next scene starts with Amanda's boyfriend getting out of the car with another girl. Amanda is seen walking the dog out, as she cuts the seat belt from the same car. She emerges in a masked ball while wearing a half-mask, and encounters her boyfriend wearing a domino mask. The two walk out to the balcony, where the two embrace, as flashback scenes quickly play out from the beginning of the video. However, her boyfriend pushes her off the balcony, as Amanda falls into the ocean. Multiple jump cuts occur between scenes of Amanda plunging in the ocean, and laying inside a bath tub back in the mansion. Chapter Three depicts Amanda flying out of the ocean floor and back into her boyfriend's sight, as she proceeds to electrocute him by punching him in the mouth. The video ends with brunette Amanda walking out of the mansion with her boyfriend on the couch, as the book lands on the 'Fin' page before finally closing.

== Live performances ==
Max gave her first televised performance of "Torn" on the pre-show at the 2019 MTV Video Music Awards in a medley with "Sweet but Psycho". During the performance, Max and the dancers appeared in silver costumes and gladiator boots, as they performed a choreographed dance with vocal runs. While appearing on the red carpet at the same event, she wore a shiny superhero costume with a red cape attached, which served as a tease for the music video released the next day. Max performed "Torn" and "Sweet but Psycho" at the 2019 MTV Europe Music Awards, where she wore a red gown while performing on a white runway, which was described by Joe Lynch of Billboard as using "minimalist imagery to maximum effect". At the 2019 Jingle Bell Ball, Max performed "Torn" in a medley with "So Am I" and "Sweet but Psycho", performing with other artists such as The Script, Rita Ora, Regard and Mabel. Max also performed "Torn" on both the British chat show The Jonathan Ross Show and the German game show Schlag den Star.

== Track listing ==
Digital download / streaming

1. "Torn" – 3:18

Digital download / streaming – Kream remix

1. "Torn" (KREAM Remix) – 2:49

Digital download / streaming – Hook n Sling remix

1. "Torn" (Hook N Sling Remix) – 3:33

Digital download / streaming – Cirkut DJ mix

1. "Torn" (Cirkut DJ Mix) – 3:29

Digital download / streaming – Adryiano remix

1. "Torn" (Adryiano Remix) – 4:33

Streaming

1. "Torn" (KREAM Remix) – 2:49
2. "Torn" (Hook N Sling Remix) – 3:33
3. "Torn" (Cirkut DJ Mix) – 3:29
4. "Torn" (Adryiano Remix) – 4:33
5. "Torn" – 3:18

German CD single

1. "Torn" – 3:18
2. "Salt" – 3:00

== Credits and personnel ==
Credits adapted from the German CD single.

Publishing and recording locations

- Published by Sam Martin Music Publishing / Artist Publishing Group West / Kobalt Songs Music Publishing / I Think I'm Nino Publishing / Max Cut Publishing / Warner Geo Met Ric Music / Warner Chappell Music / Cirkut Breaker
- Recorded at A Studios, West Hollywood, California
- Mixed at MixStar Studios, Virginia Beach, Virginia

Personnel

- Amanda Ava Koci – vocals, songwriting
- Henry Walter – songwriting, production, vocal recording
- Thomas Eriksen – songwriting, co-production
- James Lavigne – songwriting
- Madison Love – songwriting
- Sam Denison Martin – songwriting
- Serban Ghenea – mixing
- John Hanes – mixing engineer

== Charts ==
=== Weekly charts ===
Weekly chart performance for "Torn"
Chart (2019–2020)	Peak position
Australia Digital Tracks (ARIA)	34
Austria (Ö3 Austria Top 40)	60
Belgium (Ultratop 50 Wallonia)	23
Croatia (HRT)	17
Czech Republic Airplay (ČNS IFPI)	26
Euro Digital Songs (Billboard)	20
Finland Airplay (Radiosoittolista)	3
France (SNEP)	106
Germany (GfK)	59
Germany Airplay (BVMI)	2
Hungary (Rádiós Top 40)	34
Hungary (Single Top 40)	14
Iceland (Tónlistinn)	21
Italy (FIMI)	82
Mexico Ingles Airplay (Billboard)	4
Netherlands (Dutch Top 40 Tipparade)	3
New Zealand Hot Singles (RMNZ)	27
Poland Airplay (ZPAV)	3
Romania (Airplay 100)	54
San Marino (SMRRTV Top 50)	39
Scottish Singles Sales (Official Charts)	18
Slovakia Airplay (ČNS IFPI)	4
Slovenia (SloTop50)	9
South Korea BGM (Circle)	53
Switzerland (Schweizer Hitparade)	28
UK Singles (Official Charts)	87

=== Year-end charts ===
Year-end chart performance for "Torn" in 2019
Chart (2019)	Position
Poland (ZPAV)	45

Year-end chart performance for "Torn" in 2020
Chart (2020)	Position
Hungary (Rádiós Top 40)	89

== Certifications ==
Certification and sales for "Torn"
Region	Certification	Certified units/sales
Austria (IFPI Austria)	Gold	15,000^{‡}
Brazil (Pro-Música Brasil)	Platinum	40,000^{‡}
France (SNEP)	Gold	100,000^{‡}
Italy (FIMI)	Gold	35,000^{‡}
Poland (ZPAV)	3× Platinum	60,000^{‡}
Switzerland (IFPI Switzerland)	Gold	10,000^{‡}
^{‡} Sales+streaming figures based on certification alone.

== Release history ==
Release dates and formats for "Torn"
Region	Date	Format(s)	Version	Label	Ref.
Various	August 19, 2019	Digital download; streaming	Original	Atlantic	
Italy	August 30, 2019	Radio airplay	Original	Warner	
Various	September 5, 2019	Digital download; streaming	KREAM remix	Warner	
Various	September 12, 2019	Digital download; streaming	Hook N Sling remix	Warner	
Various	September 26, 2019	Digital download; streaming	Cirkut DJ mix	Warner	
Various	October 10, 2019	Digital download; streaming	Adryiano remix	Warner	
Germany	January 10, 2020	CD single	Original	Atlantic	
