= Tabú (song) =

Single by Pablo Alborán and Ava Max
- Language: Spanish; English
- English title: "Taboo"
- Released: 6 November 2019
- Genre: Latin pop
- Length: 2:59
- Label: Warner Spain
- Songwriter(s): Pablo Alborán
- Producer(s): Edgar Barrera

Pablo Alborán singles chronology
"Rayando El Sol" (2019)	"Tabú" (2019)	"Peces de ciudad" (2019)

Ava Max singles chronology
"Torn" (2019)	"Tabú" (2019)	"Salt" (2019)

Music video
- "Tabú" on YouTube

"Tabú" (transl. "Taboo") is a song by Spanish singer-songwriter Pablo Alborán and American singer Ava Max. It was released on 6 November 2019.

== Background and promotion ==
On 25 October 2019, Alborán started posting cryptic illustrations of a group called El Clan. According to the captions, all of the figures are connected to flashbacks Alborán's character once experienced and were collectively aimed at a project called "Tabú" which would be out on 6 November. Three days later, Alborán posted the image of a partially masked Ava Max and hinted at a possible collaboration. Both artists confirmed the song "Tabú" a day after that. The singers performed the song live for the first time a few days before release.

== Music video ==
The music video was released on 6 November 2019 and was directed by Santiago Salviche. The release of the video was broadcast live at Callao Square in Madrid. According to Diario Sur, the video is based on classic tragedies like Blood Wedding and Romeo and Juliet but with a futuristic spin, reminiscent of Blade Runner or Mad Max. Thematically, the video deals with a man falling in love just before getting married, therefore breaking a "taboo".

== Personnel ==
Credits adapted from Tidal.

- Pablo Alborán – songwriting, vocals
- Ava Max – vocals
- Edgar Barrera – production, engineering
- Oscar Clavel – engineering
- Bori Alarcón – mastering
- Cirkut – mixing

== Charts ==
=== Weekly charts ===
Chart performance for "Tabú"
Chart (2019–2020)	Peak position
Chile (Monitor Latino)	10
Mexico Airplay (Billboard)	10
Puerto Rico (Monitor Latino)	11
Spain (PROMUSICAE)	13
US Latin Pop Airplay (Billboard)	21

=== Year-end charts ===
2020 year-end chart performance for "Tabú"
Chart (2020)	Position
Puerto Rico Streaming (Monitor Latino)	97
Spain (PROMUSICAE)	90

== Certifications ==
Certifications for "Tabú"
Region	Certification	Certified units/sales
Peru	Gold	
Spain (PROMUSICAE)	2× Platinum	80,000^{‡}
^{‡} Sales+streaming figures based on certification alone.

== Release history ==
Release history and formats for "Tabú"
Region	Date	Format(s)	Label	Ref.
Various	6 November 2019	Digital download; streaming	Warner	
