= Million Dollar Baby (Ava Max song) =

2022 single by Ava Max

Single by Ava Max

from the album Diamonds & Dancefloors
- Released: September 1, 2022
- Genre: Eurodance; pop
- Length: 3:04
- Label: Atlantic
- Songwriters: Ava Max; Jessica Agombar; Cirkut; Lostboy; Michael Pollack; Casey Smith; David Stewart; Diane Warren
- Producers: Cirkut; Lostboy; David Stewart

Ava Max singles chronology
"Maybe You're the Problem" (2022)	"Million Dollar Baby" (2022)	"Weapons" (2022)

Music video
- "Million Dollar Baby" on YouTube

Logo
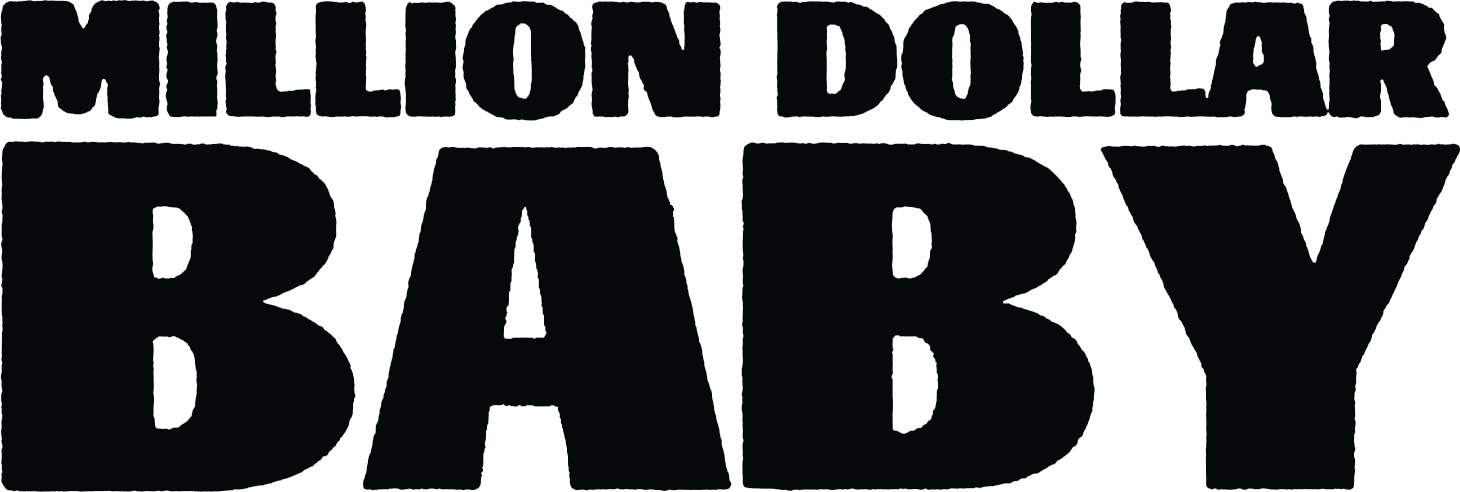

"Million Dollar Baby" is a song by American singer-songwriter Ava Max from her second studio album, Diamonds & Dancefloors (2023). The song was written by Max, Jessica Agombar, Cirkut, Lostboy, Michael Pollack, Casey Smith, David Stewart and Diane Warren, and produced by Cirkut, Lostboy and Stewart. It was released as the second single from the album for digital download and streaming by Atlantic in various countries on September 1, 2022. Drawing inspirations from the 1990s, 2000s and 2010s, the upbeat Eurodance and pop song with influences of disco, funk and soul. The song interpolates LeAnn Rimes' song "Can't Fight the Moonlight" (2000) and is titled in reference to Million Dollar Baby (2004), it delivers a message of empowerment that acts as a personal affirmation of Max's self-worth. Upon release, it received a positive reception from music critics for its music, lyrics and Max's vocal rendition as well as its adept use of the interpolation.

"Million Dollar Baby" charted at number 11 on the US Billboard Dance/Electronic Songs ranking, peaking within the top 40 on the US Adult Top 40, Mainstream Top 40 as well as on the Canadian Hot AC and CHR/Top 40 charts. Topping the charts in Hungary, the song entered the top 20 in Argentina, Belgium, Bolivia, Bulgaria, Chile, the Commonwealth of Independent States (CIS), Croatia, Ecuador, Poland and Russia. It further garnered a gold certification from the Polish Society of the Phonographic Industry (ZPAV). An accompanying music video premiered on Max's YouTube channel on September 1, showcasing two alternate versions of Max in a nightclub setting. For further promotion, the singer delivered two live rendition of the song at the MTV Europe Music Awards on November 13 and NRJ Music Award on November 18. The song was also incorporated in the video game Just Dance 2023 Edition with a choreography led by Max.

== Background and composition ==
On August 26, 2022, Max alongside American singer LeAnn Rimes collaborated on promotional efforts for "Million Dollar Baby", recreating scenes from the American comedy film Coyote Ugly (2000) in a series of TikTok. Notably referencing the American sport film Million Dollar Baby (2004), the song interpolates Rimes' work "Can't Fight the Moonlight" (2000) from the Coyote Ugly soundtrack. Simultaneously, Max revealed the song's release date of September 1 and unveiled its cover art on her social media platforms. Atlantic then released the song for digital download and streaming on the scheduled date, as the second single of Max's second studio album, Diamonds & Dancefloors (2023).

"Million Dollar Baby", written by Max (Amanda Ava Koci), Jessica Agombar, Cirkut (Henry Walter), Lostboy (Peter Rycroft), Michael Pollack, Casey Smith, David Stewart and Diane Warren, was produced by Cirkut, Lostboy and Stewart. Set in the key of D minor with a moderately fast tempo of 132 beats per minute, Max's vocal delivery ranges from the low note of A_{3} to the high note of A_{5}. It brings together upbeat Eurodance and pop with influences of disco, funk and soul. The song integrates a spectrum of sounds spanning the 1990s, 2000s and 2010s, with "a little bit of a Michael Jackson energy" as described by Max. According to Max, it holds substantial importance in her contemplation of "heartbreak and sadness", as it represents a creative fruition born out of the journey to overcome emotional turmoil. The selection of the song's title by Max serves as a personal affirmation of her "self-worth", with its lyrics carrying a message of empowerment, emphasizing "that one can overcome and achieve anything through focused determination".

== Critical reception ==
"Million Dollar Baby" received a positive reception from music critics. Lindsay Zoladz from The New York Times characterized the song as "calisthenic", "sleek" and "thumping", acknowledging that despite Max's yet-to-be-defined persona in the pop sphere, she demonstrated proficiency as a "satisfying practitioner of aughts-pop pastiche", with a nod to American singer Lady Gaga's song "Bad Romance" (2009). Bradley Stern for MuuMuse highlighted the song as a "bop" and a significant addition to Max's collection of "smash hits", applauding its "reliably catchy" and "radio-friendly" melodies and emphasizing Max's role as the creative "Interpolation Queen". Shaad D'Souza of Paper commended the song as "euphoric", similarly sharing positive sentiments related to Max's "trademark" interpolation. Nassim Aziki from Fun complimented the song as "cathy" and saluted Max's "unique signature" with a "powerful" vocal delivery and a "solid" chorus. Sébastien Lof-Lecoq for NRJ recommended the "powerful" rhythms and lyrics of the song. A critic of Chérie described the song as a "sensual" hit that owns "everything you could wish for", acclaiming its "electrifying" production, "catchy" chorus and "powerful" vocals. Abigail Siatkowski from Los Angeles noted the evident influence of Lady Gaga infused with additional pop flair that contributes to the song's distinct identity.

Reviewing Diamonds & Dancefloors, Nick Levine from NME highlighted the "sleek" production of the song reminiscent of American singer The Weeknd with a Lady Gaga-style vocal hook, noting its unexpected effectiveness despite the potential for a "mess". Sam Franzini for The Line of Best Fit described the song as a "playful and energetic" hit, noting the combination of a "confidence boost" with a "killer" bassline. According to a critic of Women InPop, the song encapsulates the album with its "pumping" beat, "sweet" melodies and a "killer" chorus. Grace Twomey from Renowned for Sound criticized the song as "schlock" with a lack of originality, while providing a "comfortable listen" for those fond of 1980s production and a "plethora of rehashed tunes". Jordi Bardají for Jenesaispop also criticized the song for containing a similar melody to "Can't Fight the Moonlight" and over-relying on interpolations, but stated that it is not "a bad song at all".

== Commercial performance ==
On February 11, 2023, "Million Dollar Baby" charted at number 11 on the US Billboard Dance/Electronic Songs ranking, maintaining a presence on the chart for a total of 13 weeks. Peaking within the top 30 on the US Adult Top 40 and Mainstream Top 40 charts, the song reached number 34 on the Canadian Hot AC as well as number 40 on the CHR/Top 40 charts. Topping the chart in Hungary, it peaked in the top 10 in Bolivia, Bulgaria, the Commonwealth of Independent States (CIS), Croatia and Russia as well as within the top 20 in Argentina, Belgium, Chile, Ecuador and Poland. In November 2023, "Million Dollar Baby" garnered a gold certification from the Polish Society of the Phonographic Industry (ZPAV) for shifting more than 25,000 units in Poland. In 2022, the song made appearances on the year-end lists of Belgium, CIS, Croatia and Russia. Furthermore, Billboard included it in its annual compilation of the top Hot Dance/Electronic songs for 2023.

== Music video and promotion ==
An official music video for "Million Dollar Baby" premiered to Max's official YouTube channel on April 28, 2022. The three-minute and 25-second video was directed by Andrew Donoho and produced by Obsidian. It initiates with a sequence showcasing Max, characterized by her dark hair, as she navigates towards the entrance of a nightclub named after her album Diamonds & Dancefloors. Within this venue, she becomes a spectator to an alternate version of herself distinguished by blonde hair, commanding the stage alongside a troupe of background dancers. The video unfolds as Max follows her blonde-haired counterpart backstage, engaging in a face-to-face encounter. Then, it leads to a convergence of the two personas, resulting in the emergence of a unified figure characterized by dark hair and adorned in sparkly attire. Further interpresed sequences within the video depict both personas independently performing in a dimly lit setting adorned with white curtains.

On November 13, 2022, Max delivered a rendition of "Million Dollar Baby" at the MTV Europe Music Awards in Germany as well as at the NRJ Music Award on November 18 in France. Between October 2022 and January 2023, a compilation of remixes complemented the release of the song, created by notable figures including American producer COASTR., Spanish disc jockey David Penn and English DJ Nathan Dawe. Also in 2022, the song was incorporated in the dance video game Just Dance 2023 Edition by French company Ubisoft with a choreography led by Max as the coach.

== Track listing ==
- Digital download and streaming
1. "Million Dollar Baby" – 3:04
- Digital download and streaming – Remixes
1. "Million Dollar Baby" (COASTR. Remix) – 2:38
2. "Million Dollar Baby" (David Penn Remix) – 3:07
3. "Million Dollar Baby" (David Penn Extended Remix) – 5:46
4. "Million Dollar Baby" (Nathan Dawe Remix) – 3:05
5. "Million Dollar Baby" (TELYKast Remix) – 3:13

== Credits and personnel ==
Credits adapted from Spotify.

- Ava Max (Amanda Ava Koci) – lead artist, songwriting
- Jessica Agombar – songwriting
- Cirkut (Henry Walter) – producing, songwriting
- Lostboy (Peter Rycroft) – producing, songwriting
- Michael Pollack – songwriting
- Casey Smith – songwriting
- David Stewart – producing, songwriting
- Diane Warren – songwriting

== Charts ==
=== Weekly charts ===
Weekly chart performance
Chart (2022–2025)	Peak position
Argentina Anglo (Monitor Latino)	15
Belarus Airplay (TopHit)	3
Belgium (Ultratop 50 Flanders)	12
Belgium (Ultratop 50 Wallonia)	17
Bolivia Anglo (Monitor Latino)	9
Bulgaria (PROPHON)	7
Canada CHR/Top 40 (Billboard)	40
Canada Hot AC (Billboard)	34
Chile Anglo (Monitor Latino)	13
CIS Airplay (TopHit)	2
Croatia International Airplay (Top lista)	8
Ecuador Anglo (Monitor Latino)	15
Estonia Airplay (TopHit)	34
Finland Airplay (Radiosoittolista)	6
France (SNEP)	139
Germany Airplay (BVMI)	7
Germany Download (Official German Charts)	33
Hungary (Dance Top 40)	4
Hungary (Rádiós Top 40)	1
Hungary (Single Top 40)	11
Kazakhstan Airplay (TopHit)	1
Lithuania Airplay (TopHit)	31
Netherlands (Dutch Top 40)	27
Netherlands (Single Tip)	22
New Zealand Hot Singles (RMNZ)	29
Poland Airplay (ZPAV)	17
Romania Airplay (TopHit)	81
Russia Airplay (TopHit)	2
San Marino (SMRRTV Top 50)	29
Slovakia Airplay (ČNS IFPI)	25
South Korea Download (Circle)	190
Sweden (Sverigetopplistan)	67
Switzerland Airplay (Schweizer Hitparade)	14
Ukraine Airplay (TopHit)	71
UK Singles Downloads (Official Charts)	51
UK Singles Sales (OCC)	51
US Adult Pop Airplay (Billboard)	23
US Hot Dance/Electronic Songs (Billboard)	11
US Pop Airplay (Billboard)	28

=== Monthly charts ===
Monthly chart performance
Chart (2022–2023)	Peak position
Belarus Airplay (TopHit)	3
CIS Airplay (TopHit)	2
Kazakhstan Airplay (TopHit)	4
Lithuania Airplay (TopHit)	37
Romania Airplay (TopHit)	98
Russia Airplay (TopHit)	4
Ukraine Airplay (TopHit)	80

=== Year-end charts ===
2022 year-end chart performance
Chart (2022)	Position
Belgium (Ultratop 50 Flanders)	102
Belgium (Ultratop 50 Wallonia)	147
CIS Airplay (TopHit)	68
Croatia International Airplay (HRT)	97
Russia Airplay (TopHit)	76

2023 year-end chart performance
Chart (2023)	Position
Belarus Airplay (TopHit)	12
CIS Airplay (TopHit)	36
Estonia Airplay (TopHit)	193
Hungary (Dance Top 40)	21
Hungary (Rádiós Top 40)	19
Kazakhstan Airplay (TopHit)	67
Lithuania Airplay (TopHit)	68
Russia Airplay (TopHit)	57
US Hot Dance/Electronic Songs (Billboard)	66

2024 year-end chart performance
Chart (2024)	Position
Hungary (Dance Top 40)	18

2025 year-end chart performance
Chart (2025)	Position
Hungary (Dance Top 40)	55

== Certifications ==
Certifications
Region	Certification	Certified units/sales
France (SNEP)	Gold	100,000^{‡}
Poland (ZPAV)	Platinum	50,000^{‡}
^{‡} Sales+streaming figures based on certification alone.

== Release history ==
Release dates and formats
Region	Date	Format	Label	Ref.
Various	September 1, 2022	Digital download; streaming	Atlantic	
Italy	September 9, 2022	Radio airplay	Warner	
United States	October 31, 2022	Adult contemporary radio	Atlantic	
United States	November 1, 2022	Contemporary hit radio	Atlantic	
