= Maybe You're the Problem =

2022 single by Ava Max

Single by Ava Max

from the album Diamonds & Dancefloors
- Released: April 28, 2022
- Recorded: 2021
- Genre: Synth-pop; dance-pop; dance-rock; new wave
- Length: 3:10
- Label: Atlantic
- Songwriters: Ava Max; Abraham Dertner; Cirkut; Jonas Jeberg; Marcus Lomax; Sean Douglas
- Producers: Abraham Dertner; Cirkut; Jonas Jeberg

Ava Max singles chronology
"The Motto" (2021)	"Maybe You're the Problem" (2022)	"Million Dollar Baby" (2022)

Music video
- "Maybe You're the Problem" on YouTube

"Maybe You're the Problem" is a song by American singer-songwriter Ava Max from her second studio album, Diamonds & Dancefloors (2023). The song was written by Max, Abraham Dertner, Cirkut, Jonas Jeberg, Marcus Lomax and Sean Douglas, and produced by Cirkut, Dertner and Jeberg. It was released as the lead single from the album for digital download and streaming by Atlantic in various countries on April 28, 2022. Blending dance, dance-pop, dance-rock, pop and synth-pop music, the song depicts Max's ex as a toxic individual unwilling to accept any form of commitment placing blame on others while absolving himself. Upon release, it garnered a positive reception from music critics for its music, lyrics and Max's vocal rendition, with various critics highlighting it as a standout on the album.

"Maybe You're the Problem" charted at number 17 on the US Billboard Dance/Electronic Songs ranking, reaching the top 30 on the Adult Top 40 and Mainstream Top 40 charts. Peaking at number one in Hungary, the song entered the top 15 in Argentina, Bolivia, Croatia, the Czech Republic, Panama, Poland and Slovakia. It received a gold certification from the Polish Society of the Phonographic Industry (ZPAV). An accompanying music video premiered on Max's YouTube channel on April 28, depicting her sunbathing in the snow, transforming into an arcade video game character and going skiing. For further promotion, the singer delivered a performance at the Los 40 Music Awards in Spain on November 4, winning the Best Video category award.

== Background and composition ==
Early in 2022, Max underwent a notable image change by altering her signature "Max cut" and adopting red hairstyle, prompting speculation about a potential shift in her artistic direction. During the Billboard Women in Music event on March 2, the singer announced the upcoming release of the lead single, "Maybe You're the Problem" from her forthcoming album. Reflecting on the creative process, she detailed her dedication to crafting the album throughout the entirety of 2021, a period she described as "the most challenging year" of her life. Max acknowledged a sense of concern as her recent work embraced heightened "vulnerability" encapsulated by her observation that "Everyone always says 'it's not you, it's me,' but sometimes the problem really isn't me, it's you." On April 14, the singer revealed the cover art of the single across various social media channels, coinciding with the publication of its release date set for April 28. Atlantic released it for digital download and streaming on the specified date as the lead single of Max's second studio album Diamonds & Dancefloors (2023).

"Maybe You're the Problem" was written by Max (Amanda Ava Koci), Abraham Dertner, Cirkut (Henry Walter), Jonas Jeberg, Marcus Lomax and Sean Douglas, and produced by Cirkut, Dertner and Jeberg. With an upbeat, rock-tinged sound reminiscent of the 1980s, the song blends dance, dance-pop, dance-rock, pop, synth-pop and new wave genres. The vocal delivery of Max spans from the low note of F♯_{3} to the high note of A_{5}, with a tempo ranging between 160 and 168 beats per minute. Set in the key of A major, the song adheres to a 4/4 time signature and maintains a chord progression of N.C–Bm-E/B-A-D throughout. Discussing the song, Max disclosed that its creation unfolded in the aftermath of experiencing two break-ups within the preceding three years. The lyrics delves into a profound realization concerning her partner's consistent evasion of taking accountability for his behavior, depicting him as a toxic individual unwilling to accept any form of commitment placing blame on others while absolving himself.

== Critical reception ==
Upon release, "Maybe You're the Problem" garnered a positive reception from music critics. Shaad D'Souza for Paper complimented the song as another "bop" from Max, applauding it as a "blast" that accelerates from "0 to 100" in mere seconds. A critic of Energy emphasised her career growth, articulating that she once again "surpassed herself" in her artistic career. Reviewing Diamonds & Dancefloors, Ella West from Rollacoaster delved into Max's artistic progression, highlighting the culmination of her pursuit in the development of the album, leading to the creation of the "pulsating" song. Grace Twomey for Renowned for Sound identified the song as an "obvious" standout with parallels to Canadian singer the Weeknd's single "Blinding Lights" (2019), commending the "infectious chorus" of the song that delivers an "empowering" message. Sam Franzini of The Line of Best Fit described the song as a "playful jab at a breakup", underscoring the "deliriously catchy" appeal of its chorus.

Nick Levine from NME labeled the song as a "bop" and praised its "plainspoken" lyrics, conveying a sentiment that, despite its perceived quality, the song may not have received the commercial recognition it deserved in the United Kingdom. Madison Murray for The Honey Pop lauded the song as a strong contender for "Song-of-the-Summer" and a "total bop", deeming it a "perfect choice" for a lead single that will leave a lasting impression on listeners. According to a critic of Women InPop, the song retained its "intoxicating" allure and the recognition as one of the potentially "most underrated songs of 2022", also complimenting the song's "addictive" beats and lyrics that contains a sense of "empowerment". Jordi Bardají from Jenesaispop remarked that the song, drawing influence by "Blinding Lights" and English-Albanian singer Dua Lipa's single "Physical" (2020), initially lacked distinction. In retrospect, Bardají observed that it fell short of achieving the impact of Max's previous hits, "Sweet but Psycho" (2018) or "Kings & Queens" (2020), despite maintaining notable streaming numbers.

== Commercial performance ==
"Maybe You're the Problem" attained number 17 on the US Billboard Dance/Electronic Songs ranking in the issue dated February 11, 2023, entering the top 30 on the Adult Top 40 and Mainstream Top 40 charts. Peaking at number one in Hungary, the song reached the top 15 in Argentina, Bolivia, Croatia, the Czech Republic, Panama, Poland and Slovakia. Other top 100 positions were achieved in Austria, the Commonwealth of Independent States (CIS), the Flanders region of Belgium, Germany, the Netherlands, Norway, Sweden, the United Kingdom and Venezuela. It also entered the airplay rankings at number 11 in Spain, at number 48 in France and at number 50 in Finland. In February 2022, the song received a gold certification from the Polish Society of the Phonographic Industry (ZPAV) for shifting more than 25,000 units in Poland. In 2022, "Maybe You're the Problem" made appearances on the year-end lists of the Flanders region of Belgium, CIS, Croatia, Hungary and Poland. Furthermore, Billboard included the song in its annual compilation of the top Hot Dance/Electronic songs for 2023.

== Music video ==
An official music video for "Maybe You're the Problem" premiered to Max's official YouTube channel on April 28, 2022. Under the direction of Joseph Kahn, the three-minute and 16-second video commences with a shot capturing Max and a companion sunbathing amidst a snowy landscape. Following this, she enjoys a snow cone with a man, and another scene showcases a woman engaged in the same activity. The perspective then shifts, providing a view through a man's binoculars that captures Max from a helicopter, using her own binoculars to observe the situation above. The video progresses with the man transitioning to an indoor setting, engaging in gameplay on an arcade cabinet, while Max transforms into an animated character participating in a skiing scenario with other individuals. Taking a directing role, the man guides the virtual ski game through the arcade cabinet. Meanwhile, a man lies on the floor who periodically mutating also into an animated character, with Max manipulating an object over his body. Throughout the video, Max intermittently appears in snowy landscape shots, delivering various performances in different setting. The video concludes by revisiting the opening sequence, depicting Max wielding her ski pole to touch the man's head, causing in his body undergoing a conversion into fragile silver shattered pieces.

== Promotion ==
On June 1, Max premiered "Maybe You're the Problem" for the first time on the American morning show Today. Subsequently, on July 6, the singer delivered a rendition of the song on the British magazine show The One Show. Following this, she went on to perform at the Los 40 Music Awards in Spain on November 4, concurrently winning an award in the category for the Best Video. Between June and July 2022, a series of remixes complemented the release of the song, created by figures including Brazilian disc jockey Las Bibas From Vizcaya and Dutch DJ MOTi.

== Track listing ==
- Digital download and streaming
1. "Maybe You're the Problem" – 3:10
- Digital download and streaming – Remixes
1. "Maybe You're the Problem" (Crush Club Remix) – 3:02
2. "Maybe You're the Problem" (Las Bibas From Vizcaya Remix) – 4:05
3. "Maybe You're the Problem" (MOTi Remix) – 2:45

== Credits and personnel ==
Credits adapted from Spotify and Tidal.

- Ava Max (Amanda Ava Koci) – lead artist, songwriting
- Abraham Dertner – producing, programming, songwriting
- Bryan Bordone – assistant mixing
- Cirkut (Henry Walter) – producing, programming, songwriting
- Chris Gehringer – mastering
- Jonas Jeberg – producing, programming, songwriting
- Marcus Lomax – songwriting
- Sean Douglas – songwriting
- Serban Ghenea – mixing

== Charts ==
=== Weekly charts ===
Weekly chart performance
Chart (2022–2026)	Peak position
Argentina Anglo (Monitor Latino)	13
Austria (Ö3 Austria Top 40)	75
Belgium (Ultratop 50 Flanders)	22
Bolivia Anglo (Monitor Latino)	12
Canada CHR/Top 40 (Billboard)	41
CIS (TopHit)	50
Croatia (HRT)	2
Czech Republic Airplay (ČNS IFPI)	8
Finland Airplay (Radiosoittolista)	50
France Airplay (SNEP)	48
Germany (GfK)	65
Guatemala Anglo (Monitor Latino)	9
Hungary (Dance Top 40)	12
Hungary (Rádiós Top 40)	1
Hungary (Single Top 40)	26
Netherlands (Dutch Top 40)	20
Netherlands (Single Top 100)	71
New Zealand Hot Singles (RMNZ)	21
Norway (VG-lista)	34
Panama Anglo (Monitor Latino)	12
Poland Airplay (ZPAV)	6
San Marino (SMRRTV Top 50)	41
Slovakia Airplay (ČNS IFPI)	8
South Korea BGM (Circle)	59
Spain Airplay (PROMUSICAE)	11
Sweden (Sverigetopplistan)	55
UK Singles (Official Charts)	83
US Adult Pop Airplay (Billboard)	22
US Hot Dance/Electronic Songs (Billboard)	17
US Pop Airplay (Billboard)	26
Venezuela (Record Report)	41

=== Monthly charts ===
Monthly chart performance
Chart (2022)	Peak position
CIS (TopHit)	57

=== Year-end charts ===
2022 year-end chart performance
Chart (2022)	Position
Belgium (Ultratop 50 Flanders)	97
CIS (TopHit)	157
Croatia (HRT)	29
Hungary (Rádiós Top 100)	18
Netherlands (Dutch Top 40)	79
Poland (ZPAV)	71

2023 year-end chart performance
Chart (2023)	Position
Hungary (Dance Top 40)	41
Hungary (Rádiós Top 40)	45
US Hot Dance/Electronic Songs (Billboard)	64

2024 year-end chart performance
Chart (2024)	Position
Hungary (Dance Top 40)	49

2025 year-end chart performance
Chart (2025)	Position
Hungary (Dance Top 40)	34

== Certifications ==
Certifications
Region	Certification	Certified units/sales
Poland (ZPAV)	Platinum	50,000^{‡}
Spain (Promusicae)	Gold	30,000^{‡}
United Kingdom (BPI)	Silver	200,000^{‡}
^{‡} Sales+streaming figures based on certification alone.

== Release history ==
Release dates and formats
Region	Date	Format	Label	Ref.
Various	April 28, 2022	Digital download; streaming	Atlantic	
United Kingdom	April 28, 2022	Digital download; streaming	Atlantic	
Italy	April 29, 2022	Radio airplay	Warner	
United States	May 2, 2022	Adult contemporary radio	Atlantic	
United States	May 3, 2022	Contemporary hit radio	Atlantic	
