= Salt (Ava Max song) =

2019 single by Ava Max

Single by Ava Max

from the album Heaven & Hell
- A-side: "Torn"
- Published: July 27, 2018
- Released: December 12, 2019
- Studio: A Studios, West Hollywood, California
- Genre: Dance-pop
- Length: 3:00
- Label: Atlantic
- Songwriters: Amanda Koci; Autumn Rowe; Henry Walter; Madison Love; Nicole Morier
- Producer: Cirkut

Ava Max singles chronology
"Tabú" (2019)	"Salt" (2019)	"Alone, Pt. II" (2019)

Lyric video
- "Salt" on YouTube

"Salt" is a song by American singer-songwriter Ava Max, released on December 12, 2019, through Atlantic Records. It was included on her debut studio album, Heaven & Hell (2020). The song was initially released on YouTube and SoundCloud in 2018, before being re-released on streaming services. It was written by Max, Autumn Rowe, Madison Love, Nicole Morier, and the producer Cirkut. The dance-pop song is regarded as a "fan-favorite" by several publications, who praised the upbeat production. "Salt" peaked at number one in Poland, and charted in the top 10 in Austria, CIS, Finland, Germany, Norway, Ukraine, and Switzerland. The song received a quadruple platinum certification in Poland and Norway, and was certified platinum in four countries.

== Background and composition ==
"Salt" was initially released on YouTube and SoundCloud in 2018, where it gained 4 million views on the former by December 2019. On December 5, 2019, Max revealed the release date on social media, which was subsequently re-released as a digital single on several streaming services on December 12, 2019. She acknowledged that the song's re-release was due to its high streaming numbers, despite containing no prior marketing or promotion. It was written by Max, Autumn Rowe, Madison Love, Nicole Morier, and the producer Cirkut.

"Salt" is a dance-pop song, with elements of disco. It contains "pumping disco beats from the seventies and eighties" blended with Max's "vocal inflexions". A violin is heard in the introduction, while Wonder Woman and Marilyn Monroe are lyrically mentioned throughout the song, due to their icon status in femininity. The song's lyrics describes the carefree nature of not crying over an ex.

== Critical reception ==
Several publications have regarded "Salt" to be a "fan-favorite" since its 2018 release. Rania Aniftos of Billboard described the song as an "upbeat, sassy track about having fun after a sad spell", while Madeline Roth of MTV News called it "dance-pop blissfulness". Writing for Stereogum, Chris DeVille wrote that "Salt" is the best song out of Max's discography despite sounding similar to Lady Gaga. Shaoni Das of Music Talkers stated that the song is an "exhilarating dance number, awash in pools of glitter, glamour, and confidence". However, Nicholas Hautman of Us Weekly criticized the song's lyrics for being cliché, specifically noting that it is "about crying so much that you literally run out of the electrolytes needed to form tears".

== Commercial performance ==
"Salt" topped the Polish Airplay Top 100 on the chart issued April 4, 2020, where it was ultimately certified quadruple platinum by the Polish Society of the Phonographic Industry (ZPAV) for track-equivalent sales of 80,000 units on August 11, 2021. In Norway, the song debuted at number 37 on the VG-lista, before peaking at number five. On the Ö3 Austria Top 40 chart, "Salt" debuted at number 71 on the chart dated March 13, 2020. It peaked at number eight on the chart dated April 17, 2020, and was certified platinum by the International Federation of the Phonographic Industry (IFPI) for track-equivalent sales of 30,000 units in the country. In Germany, "Salt" debuted at number 99 on the Offizielle Deutsche Charts dated February 21, 2020, and peaked at number 10 on the chart issued April 10, 2020. The song received a platinum certification by the Bundesverband Musikindustrie (BVMI) for track-equivalent sales of 400,000 units in the country. "Salt" charted in the top 10 in Finland, Russia, Ukraine, and Switzerland, while receiving a platinum certification in Brazil, and gold certifications in France and the United States.

== Track listing ==
Digital download / streaming

1. "Salt" – 3:00

Digital download / streaming – acoustic

1. "Salt" (Acoustic) – 3:10

Digital download / streaming – The Remixes

1. "Salt" (Syn Cole Remix) – 3:11
2. "Salt" (Toby Green Remix) – 2:47

Spotify streaming

1. "Salt" – 3:00
2. "Torn" – 3:18
3. "Freaking Me Out" – 3:12

== Credits and personnel ==
Credits adapted from "Torn" German CD single and Tidal.

Recording

- Recorded at A Studios, West Hollywood, California

Personnel

- Amanda Ava Koci – vocals, songwriting
- Henry Walter – songwriting, production, mixing, programming, vocal recording
- Autumn Rowe – songwriting
- Madison Love – songwriting
- Nicole Morier – songwriting
- Chris Gehringer – mastering
- Serban Ghenea – mixing
- John Hanes – engineering

== Charts ==
=== Weekly charts ===
Weekly chart performance for "Salt"
Chart (2019–2020)	Peak position
Austria (Ö3 Austria Top 40)	8
Belgium (Ultratip Bubbling Under Flanders)	23
Belgium (Ultratip Bubbling Under Wallonia)	9
CIS Airplay (TopHit)	2
Croatia (HRT)	29
Czech Republic Singles Digital (ČNS IFPI)	85
Denmark (Tracklisten)	25
Euro Digital Songs (Billboard)	15
Finland (Suomen virallinen lista)	6
France (SNEP)	38
Germany (GfK)	10
Germany Airplay (BVMI)	1
Greece (IFPI)	66
Hungary (Dance Top 40)	13
Hungary (Rádiós Top 40)	15
Hungary (Single Top 40)	8
Hungary (Stream Top 40)	22
Ireland (IRMA)	98
Lithuania (AGATA)	34
Netherlands (Dutch Top 40)	16
Netherlands (Single Top 100)	35
Norway (VG-lista)	5
Poland Airplay (ZPAV)	1
Romania (Airplay 100)	52
Russia Airplay (TopHit)	3
Slovakia Airplay (ČNS IFPI)	1
Slovakia Singles Digital (ČNS IFPI)	40
Slovenia (SloTop50)	3
South Korea BGM (Circle)	39
Sweden (Sverigetopplistan)	33
Switzerland (Schweizer Hitparade)	8
Ukraine Airplay (TopHit)	5

2021 weekly chart performance
Chart (2021)	Peak position
Hungary (Dance Top 40)	15

2022 weekly chart performance
Chart (2022)	Peak position
Hungary (Dance Top 40)	18

2023 weekly chart performance
Chart (2023)	Peak position
Hungary (Dance Top 40)	23

2024 weekly chart performance
Chart (2024)	Peak position
Hungary (Dance Top 40)	39

2026 weekly chart performance
Chart (2026)	Peak position
Hungary (Rádiós Top 40)	39

=== Year-end charts ===
Year-end chart performance for "Salt" in 2020
Chart (2020)	Position
Austria (Ö3 Austria Top 40)	30
CIS (TopHit)	8
Denmark (Tracklisten)	43
France (SNEP)	145
Germany (Official German Charts)	33
Hungary (Dance Top 40)	53
Hungary (Rádiós Top 40)	68
Hungary (Single Top 40)	41
Hungary (Stream Top 40)	53
Netherlands (Dutch Top 40)	59
Netherlands (Single Top 100)	100
Poland (ZPAV)	4
Russia Airplay (TopHit)	6
Sweden (Sverigetopplistan)	34
Switzerland (Schweizer Hitparade)	23
Ukraine Airplay (TopHit)	37

Year-end chart performance for "Salt" in 2021
Chart (2021)	Position
CIS (TopHit)	100
Hungary (Dance Top 40)	43
Russia Airplay (TopHit)	110

Year-end chart performance for "Salt" in 2022
Chart (2022)	Position
Hungary (Dance Top 40)	55
Hungary (Rádiós Top 40)	71

Year-end chart performance for "Salt" in 2023
Chart (2023)	Position
Hungary (Dance Top 40)	59
Hungary (Rádiós Top 40)	76

== Certifications ==
Certifications and sales for "Salt"
Region	Certification	Certified units/sales
Australia (ARIA)	Gold	35,000^{‡}
Austria (IFPI Austria)	2× Platinum	60,000^{‡}
Brazil (Pro-Música Brasil)	Platinum	40,000^{‡}
Canada (Music Canada)	Platinum	80,000^{‡}
Denmark (IFPI Danmark)	Platinum	90,000^{‡}
France (SNEP)	Platinum	200,000^{‡}
Germany (BVMI)	Platinum	400,000^{‡}
New Zealand (RMNZ)	Gold	15,000^{‡}
Norway (IFPI Norway)	4× Platinum	240,000^{‡}
Poland (ZPAV)	4× Platinum	200,000^{‡}
United Kingdom (BPI)	Silver	200,000^{‡}
United States (RIAA)	Gold	500,000^{‡}
^{‡} Sales+streaming figures based on certification alone.

== Release history ==
Release dates and formats for "Salt"
Region	Date	Format(s)	Version	Label	Ref.
Various	July 27, 2018	SoundCloud	Original	Self-released	
Various	December 12, 2019	Digital download; streaming	Original	Atlantic	
Various	April 8, 2020	Digital download; streaming	Acoustic	Atlantic	
Various	April 16, 2020	Digital download; streaming	Remixes	Atlantic	

== See also ==
- List of number-one singles of 2020 (Poland)
