= Freaking Me Out =

2019 single by Ava Max

- Music video re-release artwork

Single by Ava Max
- Released: July 31, 2019
- Genre: Pop
- Length: 3:13
- Label: Atlantic
- Songwriters: Amanda Ava Koci; Henry Walter; Jon Bellion; Jonathan Simpson; Mark Williams; Raul Cubina; Seth Reger
- Producer: Cirkut

Ava Max singles chronology
"So Am I" (2019)	"Freaking Me Out" (2019)	"Slow Dance" (2019)

Music video
- "Freaking Me Out" on YouTube

"Freaking Me Out" is a song by American singer-songwriter Ava Max, released as a single through Atlantic Records on July 31, 2019. The song was written by Max, Jon Bellion, Jonathan Simpson, Mark Williams, Raul Cubina, Seth Reger, and the producer Cirkut. It is a pop song, with lyrics describing the feeling of losing senses during a new relationship. An accompanying music video was released on October 31, directed by Edgar Daniel. It depicts Max trapped inside a mansion, which is filled with horror fiction objects and scenes. "Freaking Me Out" charted on the New Zealand Hot Singles chart at number 29.

== Background and release ==
"Freaking Me Out" was released on July 31, 2019, which was accompanied by a lyric video. Max additionally performed the song on Entertainment Weekly series "In the Basement" in August 2019. The song was written by Max, Jon Bellion, Jonathan Simpson, Mark Williams, Raul Cubina, Seth Reger, and the producer Cirkut. In a statement, Max described the lyrics as "realizing that you're in love with someone to a degree that feels almost beyond your control". "Freaking Me Out" charted on the New Zealand Hot Singles chart at number 29.

== Composition ==
"Freaking Me Out" is described by Brittany Spanos of Rolling Stone as an initial ballad tease with a guitar introduction, which escalates into a "midtempo pop song" during the chorus as Max sings the pop hook, "I'm falling for you / So much so / That it's freaking me out". According to the song's sheet music that was published on Musicnotes.com, it is set in the time signature of 4/4 common time, with a tempo of 98 beats per minute, while composed in the key of E major. Max's voice on the track ranges from the low note of E_{3} to the high note of E_{5}, while the song is constructed in verse–chorus form. The song's lyrics utilize horror fiction tropes to represent the anxiety of falling, as Max sings the hook over a "vibrant" pop production. She uses "growly vocals" as the lyrics describe the feeling of losing senses during a new relationship.

== Music video ==
A music video was released as a Halloween special on October 31, 2019. It was directed by Edgar Daniel, and is a literal retelling of the song's lyrics with gothic and glamorous visuals. The video begins as Max observes the ocean waves. While inside a mansion, she is chained by a man within the basement, which serves as a metaphor to describe Max's unfamiliar and terrifying feelings in a relationship. Madeline Roth of MTV News noted that while the music video contained scary scenes such as a dungeon, rocking chair, and a drummer boy, it also included several romantic moments which acknowledged that it is a love song.

== Track listings ==
Digital download
No.	Title	Length
1.	"Freaking Me Out"	3:13

Digital download – The Remixes
No.	Title	Length
1.	"Freaking Me Out" (Curt Reynolds Remix)	3:00
2.	"Freaking Me Out" (Bingo Players Remix)	2:45
3.	"Freaking Me Out" (Keanu Silva Remix)	2:57
4.	"Freaking Me Out"	3:13

== Credits and personnel ==
Credits were adapted from Apple Music metadata.

- Amanda Ava Koci – vocals, songwriting
- Henry Walter – production, songwriting
- Jon Bellion – songwriting
- Jonathan Simpson – songwriting
- Mark Williams – songwriting
- Raul Cubina – songwriting
- Seth Reger – songwriting

== Charts ==
Chart performance for "Freaking Me Out"
Chart (2019)	Peak position
New Zealand Hot Singles (RMNZ)	29
