= Weapons (song) =

2022 single by Ava Max

Single by Ava Max

from the album Diamonds & Dancefloors
- Released: November 10, 2022
- Genre: Disco; electro; Europop
- Length: 2:31
- Label: Atlantic
- Songwriters: Ava Max; Cirkut; Melanie Fontana; Madison Love; Michel Lindgren Schulz; Ryan Tedder
- Producer: Michel Lindgren Schulz

Ava Max singles chronology
"Million Dollar Baby" (2022)	"Weapons" (2022)	"Dancing's Done" (2022)

Visualizer
- "Weapons" on YouTube

"Weapons" is a song by American singer-songwriter Ava Max from her second studio album, Diamonds & Dancefloors (2023). The song was written by Max, Cirkut, Lostboy, Melanie Fontana, Madison Love, Michel Lindgren Schulz and Ryan Tedder, and produced by Schulz. It was released as the third single from the album for digital download and streaming by Atlantic in various countries on November 10, 2022. Combining disco, electro and Europop genres, the song tells a tale of cold hearts and harsh words encountered in the pursuit of love within an expansive urban setting. Upon release, it received a positive reception from music critics for its lyrics, music and Max's vocal delivery. Commercially, it charted within the top 100 in Belgium, Croatia, Hungary, Sweden and Switzerland. For further promotion, an accompanying visualizer premiered on Max's YouTube channel on March 3, 2023.

== Background and composition ==
Produced by Michel Lindgren Schulz, "Weapons" was written by Schulz along with Max (Amanda Ava Koci), Cirkut (Henry Walter), Melanie Fontana, Madison Love and Ryan Tedder. Atlantic released the song for digital download and streaming on November 10, 2022, as the third single of Max's second studio album, Diamonds & Dancefloors (2023). Stating an emotional attachment, Max highlighted that "these lyrics are my favorite of any song I've released this year". Characterized by disco, electro and Europop genres, it tells a tale of emotional challenges articulated through the depiction of cold hearts and harsh words encountered in the pursuit of love within an expansive urban setting. Lyrics such as, "Stop using your words as weapons, They're never gonna, shoot me down, Stop, it's time that you learn a lesson, My love is gonna drown you out", emphasizes that these challenges do not waver her conviction in a positive outcome.

== Reception and promotion ==
"Weapons" generally received a positive reception from music critics. Madeline Dovi from Medium highlighted the song as an "empowerment ballad" that "bursts forth with prowess and assuredness", drawing parallels to American singer Pat Benatar's song "Love Is A Battlefield" (1983). George Griffiths for Official Charts Company complimented the song as "Lady Gaga-esque". Writing for NRG Albania, the author commended Max's consistent emphasis on vocal strength in her successive releases. Reviewing Diamonds & Dancefloors, Sam Franzini from The Line of Best Fit described the song as a "clumsy anti-bullying anthem", comparing its sound to music "commissioned" for a "middle school". Jordi Bardají for Jenesaispop referred to the "heroic chorus" as a "cliché within a cliché".

Commercially, "Weapons" reached number 10 in the Walloon region of Belgium, number 29 in Hungary, number 32 in the Flemish region of Belgium, number 33 in Croatia, number 54 in Sweden and number 95 in Switzerland. Furthermore, the song charted at number one on the Dutch Tipparade ranking and number 34 on the New Zealand Hot Singles. For promotional purposes, an official visualizer for "Weapons" premiered to Max's official YouTube channel on March 3, 2023.

== Credits and personnel ==
Credits adapted from Spotify.

- Ava Max (Amanda Ava Koci) – lead artist, songwriting
- Cirkut (Henry Walter) – songwriting
- Melanie Fontana – songwriting
- Madison Love – songwriting
- Michel Lindgren Schulz – producing, songwriting
- Ryan Tedder – songwriting

== Charts ==
=== Weekly charts ===
Weekly chart performance
Chart (2022)	Peak position
Belgium (Ultratop 50 Flanders)	32
Belgium (Ultratop 50 Wallonia)	10
Croatia International Airplay (Top lista)	33
France Airplay (SNEP)	55
Hungary (Rádiós Top 40)	29
Netherlands (Airplay Top 40)	31
Netherlands (Tipparade)	1
New Zealand Hot Singles (RMNZ)	34
South Korea BGM (Circle)	134
Sweden (Sverigetopplistan)	54
Switzerland (Schweizer Hitparade)	95

=== Year-end charts ===
Year-end chart performance
Chart (2023)	Position
Belgium (Ultratop 50 Wallonia)	66

== Release history ==
Release dates and formats
Region	Date	Format	Label	Ref.
Various	November 10, 2022	Digital download; streaming	Atlantic	
