= Diamonds & Dancefloors =

2023 studio album by Ava Max

Studio album by Ava Max
- Released: January 27, 2023
- Recorded: 2021–2022
- Genres: Pop; dance-pop; synth-pop; new wave
- Length: 39:36
- Label: Atlantic
- Producers: Burns; Cirkut; Connor McDonough; Abraham Dertner; T.I. Jakke; Jason Evigan; Omer Fedi; Johnny Goldstein; Jonas Jeberg; Lindgren; Lostboy; David Stewart

Ava Max chronology
Heaven & Hell (2020)	Diamonds & Dancefloors (2023)	Don't Click Play (2025)

Alternative cover
- Primary physical cover

Singles from Diamonds & Dancefloors
- 1. "Maybe You're the Problem" Released: April 28, 2022; 2. "Million Dollar Baby" Released: September 1, 2022; 3. "Weapons" Released: November 10, 2022; 4. "Dancing's Done" Released: December 20, 2022; 5. "One of Us" Released: January 12, 2023; 6. "Ghost" Released: March 16, 2023

Diamonds & Dancefloors is the second studio album by American singer-songwriter Ava Max. It was released on January 27, 2023, through Atlantic Records. Recorded throughout 2021 and 2022, the album is a dance-pop record much like Max's debut studio album Heaven & Hell (2020). The album was promoted by the release of six singles: "Maybe You're the Problem", "Million Dollar Baby", "Weapons", "Dancing's Done", "One of Us", and "Ghost". The album debuted in the top ten in various countries, including Austria, Germany, Hungary, Spain and Switzerland. In the United States, the album debuted at number thirty-four on the Billboard 200.

Diamonds & Dancefloors received generally favorable reviews, with a Metacritic score of 80 out of 100 based on four reviews. Critics highlighted the album's production quality, vocal delivery, and incorporation of 1980s-inspired dance-pop elements, while some offered criticism regarding its use of interpolations and lyrical originality.

== Background ==
On February 12, 2022, Max cut off her signature "Max Cut" and dyed her hair red, sparking rumors about the start of a new era. On March 2, 2022, she confirmed that a song titled "Maybe You're the Problem" would be the lead single. She also stated that her upcoming album would be her most personal album to date. In an interview with Billboard, she revealed that she had been working on the album for the whole of 2021, which she refers to as "the hardest year" of her life. She also stated that she was "terrified" as her recently recorded music became more vulnerable.

On June 1, 2022, she revealed the album name and the main original cover art, first on social media, then on The Today Show. Max was seen on the original cover art covered in diamonds on the cover with a diamond in her mouth. The album is set to include 14 tracks in total. The album was set for release on October 14, 2022, but was postponed to January 27, 2023, with the official main cover art which was unveiled on December 19, 2022.

== Cover artworks ==
The album has three official album artworks, all shot by American photographer Marilyn Hue. The first cover art for Diamonds and Dancefloors was unveiled by Max on June 1, 2022, on her social media platforms. It features a close up of Max covered in diamonds with a diamond in her mouth. The cover was later only used on physical versions of the album; the new one was used on digital and streaming editions.

The main cover art for the album was unveiled on December 19, 2022, once again on Max's social media platforms. It was taken after the filming of the visualizer for "Dancing's Done", the album's fourth single, featuring Max laying on blue diamonds with sliver ones seen near her head. In an interview with ET Canada, Max explained why she made it the album's main cover:

It's from the Diamonds & Dancefloors visualizer for "Dancing's Done". And so when I finished with that visualizer, I was like "Ok, I've been sitting on the other album cover for way too long, it's time to swap it, and we're swapping it for this." And it really looked like the cover to me.

— Ava Max, from "Ava Max Explains Why She Changed 'Diamonds & Dancefloors' Album Cover", ET Canada

The album received a third cover for the CD version of the album as an alternative album cover version; the artwork switches the back cover as the front and the original front as the back cover. The cover features Max standing on a giant tilting diamond while holding a suspended microphone on one hand and pouring champagne from a glass with her other hand.

== Composition ==
Diamonds & Dancefloors is a pop, dance-pop and new wave record with a "synth-pop backbone" and "electropop melodies with some 90s synths and a touch of disco". According to Max, the sound and lyrics of the album "will make you cry and dance at the same time". She described the album's main theme as "basically heartbreak on the dancefloor". Unlike her previous album, Heaven & Hell, Max mentioned that Diamonds & Dancefloors is more about her personal life, especially her past relationships. The album contains lyrics about the deterioration and eventual breakdown of a relationship, as well as empowering and escapist lyrics.

=== Songs ===
Diamonds & Dancefloors opens with "Million Dollar Baby", a pop and Eurodance song, inspired by music from the 2000s. The song interpolates "Can't Fight the Moonlight" (2000) by LeAnn Rimes and contains lyrics that reference assistive reproductive technology. The second track, "Sleepwalker", is a synth-pop song with "slick" production and a "nocturnal feeling", where Max sings about becoming the obsession of someone who has fallen in love with her. The third track, "Maybe You're the Problem", is a dance-pop and synth-pop song, with influences from Eurodance, Europop and music in the 1980s. The lyrics describe Max's initiation to depart from a relationship with a selfish partner. The fourth track, "Ghost", is an early 1990s house song with lyrics about not being able to forget an ex-lover. The fifth track, "Hold Up (Wait A Minute)", is a dance-pop song with elements of disco, where Max sings about her growing suspicion of her lover cheating on her with someone else. The sixth track, "Weapons", is a disco-pop and Europop song that contains lyrics about recognizing one's own fallibility and vulnerability and therefore becoming strong and "invincible". It is followed by the album's title track, an early 1990s house song that has been described as a "club anthem", with lyrics of escapism and freedom, inspired by Max's mental state during the COVID-19 pandemic.

The eighth track, "In the Dark", contains "dark melodies", UK garage beats and lyrics about being loved only at night. It is followed by "Turn Off The Lights", a disco-influenced song where Max "promises euphoria once the lights go out". The tenth track, "One of Us", is a song inspired by 1980s disco and dance music, where Max sings about not wanting to hurt her lover. The eleventh track, "Get Outta My Heart", is an electronic dance song where Max sings about ditching an ex-lover. It samples the film score of the 1968 film Twisted Nerve. It is followed by "Cold as Ice", a disco-pop and dance-pop song with male backing vocals. The penultimate track, "Last Night on Earth", is an electro song with lyrics inspired by the disaster films Geostorm (2017) and San Andreas (2015). The album closes with "Dancing's Done", a Europop song where Max sings about what could happen at the end of the night between her and someone else.

== Release and promotion ==
Diamonds & Dancefloors was released on January 27, 2023, through Atlantic Records. The standard edition of the album was released for digital download and streaming and physically on CD, cassette and vinyl. The CD was released with two different covers and the vinyl record in four different colors. The Japanese edition of the album was released on CD with two bonus tracks: a remix of "Maybe You're the Problem" and a remix of "Million Dollar Baby". On February 22, 2023, Max announced her first headlining tour in support of the album, titled On Tour (Finally). She also stated that a deluxe edition of the album was planned to be released; however, after the last show of the tour on September 9, 2023, she indicated in an Instagram post that she moved on from Diamonds & Dancefloors in favor of developing her third album.

From December 21 to 30, 2022, Max held an activity called "12 Days of Diamonds & Dancefloors", where she planned to share a new visualizer every day for twelve days. On the first day, she posted a visualizer for "Dancing's Done" on her YouTube channel. The next day, a snippet of the visualizer for "Weapons" was posted via TikTok. For the next seven days, she posted snippets of the visualizers for the title track, "Turn Off the Lights", "Cold as Ice", "In the Dark", "Last Night on Earth", "Hold Up (Wait a Minute)" and "Get Outta My Heart". On the last day of the event, a snippet of the visualizer for "Ghost" was released. Max then mentioned that she would save three more surprises for the month of January. The full visualizer for "One of Us" was released on the album's release day. It was followed by the full visualizer for "Weapons" on March 3, 2023, and the full visualizer for "Ghost" on March 16, 2023. In April 2024, Max revealed she did not release the full visualizers for the rest of the tracks because she was not satisfied with the result; however, she did not want to discard them completely, which is why she decided to post snippets of them.

=== Singles ===
On March 2, 2022, Max announced that "Maybe You're The Problem" would be the lead single of the album. She began teasing the song through snippets and TikTok videos. It was finally released on April 28, 2022, and subsequently debuted and peaked at number 83 on the UK Singles Chart. Max performed the song for the first time on June 1, 2022, on The Today Show, where she also announced the album. She performed the song again at the 2022 LOS40 Music Awards on November 4 of the same year.

In August 2022, Max began teasing "Million Dollar Baby". The song was released on September 1, 2022, as the second single from the album. On October 13, 2022, Max revealed the track listing of the album along with and the back cover, on social media. Max performed the song at the 2022 MTV Europe Music Awards on November 13, and at the 2022 NRJ Music Awards on November 18. The song appears in the rhythm game Just Dance 2023 Edition, with the choreography performed by Max herself as a coach.

Through TikTok, Max teased the release of the album's third single, "Weapons", which was released on November 10, 2022. On December 20, 2022, Max released "Dancing's Done" as the album's fourth single, and on January 12, 2023, Max released "One of Us" as the album's fifth single. On March 16, 2023, Max released the official visualizer of "Ghost" as the album's sixth single. The song also received a remix by Italian DJ's Merk & Kremont, which was released on May 12, 2023.

=== Promotional singles ===
The album's first and only promotional single, "Cold as Ice", was released on January 24, 2023.

== Tour ==
On Tour (Finally)
- Tour by Ava Max
- Location: North America; Europe; Asia
- Associated album: Diamonds & Dancefloors
- Start date: April 14, 2023
- End date: September 9, 2023
- Legs: 2
- No. of shows: 19 in North America; 29 in Europe; 1 in Asia; 46 in total

On Tour (Finally) is the debut headlining concert tour by Max, in support of the album. The tour was first announce with 24 dates in Europe on February 22, 2023. The dates for the North American leg and the music festivals were announced on April 3, 2023. On April 6, 2023, American singer Emlyn announced that she would be the opening act for the European leg. On May 4, 2023, American band The Scarlet Opera announced that they would be the opening act for the North American leg.

== Critical reception ==
Professional ratings
Aggregate scores
Source	Rating
Metacritic	80/100
Review scores
Source	Rating
AllMusic	4.5/5 stars
The Line of Best Fit	7/10
NME	3/5 stars
PopMatters	7/10

Diamonds & Dancefloors received a score of 80 out of 100 based on 4 reviews on review aggregator Metacritic, indicating "generally favorable" reception.

The album received generally positive reviews from critics and fans, praising Max's vocal performance, mixture of dance genres, and throwback to the 1980s dance pop genre, while criticism was aimed towards the continued use of interpolations, lack of originality and cliché lyrics. Neil Z. Yeung of AllMusic wrote that the album is "deftly executed and ideal for repeat listens" and "it's pure, irresistible thrills from start to finish". Yeung found Max's vocal power "passionate". Sam Franzini of The Line of Best Fit found that the album is "shimmering and twinkling with production that is consistently sharp", although "we don't learn much about Max on these songs", because the songs have "no narrative sense". Furthermore, AllMusic included the album in its year-end compilation of the favorite pop albums of 2023.

== Commercial performance ==
In the United States, Diamonds & Dancefloors debuted at number 34 on the US Billboard 200, selling 7,000 pure album sales. Additionally, it debuted at number two on the Top Dance/Electronic Albums chart, and later became the twenty-fourth best-selling Dance/Electronic album of 2023 in the country.

In Germany and Spain, the album debuted at numbers eight and ten, respectively, marking her second consecutive top ten album in both countries. It also debuted at number fourteen in France and number six in Austria, matching the peak of Heaven & Hell (2020) in both countries. In the UK, it debuted and peaked at number 11 on the UK Albums Chart, becoming her second consecutive top 15 album in the country after Heaven & Hell (2020).

== Track listing ==
Diamonds & Dancefloors – Standard edition
No.	Title	Lyrics	Music	Producer(s)	Length
1.	"Million Dollar Baby"	Amanda Ava Koci; Jessica Agombar	David Stewart; Michael Pollack; Peter Rycroft; Henry Walter; Diane Warren	Cirkut; Lostboy; Stewart	3:04
2.	"Sleepwalker"	Koci; Sean Douglas	Marcus "MarcLo" Lomax; Walter; Jonas Jeberg	Cirkut; Jeberg	3:10
3.	"Maybe You're the Problem"	Koci; Douglas	Lomax; Abraham Dertner; Walter; Jeberg	Cirkut; Jeberg; Dertner^{[c]}	3:10
4.	"Ghost"	Koci; Uzoechi Emenike	Walter	Cirkut	3:01
5.	"Hold Up (Wait a Minute)"	Koci; Madison Love	Samuel Martin; Nathaniel Merchant; Jesse Leonard Aicher; Walter; William Spencer Bastian; Johnny Goldstein	Cirkut; Goldstein	2:28
6.	"Weapons"	Koci; Love; Melanie Fontana	Walter; Ryan Tedder; Michel "Lindgren" Schulz	Lindgren; Cirkut^{[c]}	2:31
7.	"Diamonds & Dancefloors"	Koci; Caroline Ailin	Pollack; Walter	Cirkut	2:35
8.	"In the Dark"	Koci; Love	Walter; Omer Fedi	Cirkut; Fedi	2:52
9.	"Turn Off the Lights"	Koci; Love	Connor McDonough; Walter	Cirkut; C. McDonough	2:36
10.	"One of Us"	Koci; Brett McLaughlin; Ailin	Walter; Matthew James Burns	Cirkut; Burns	2:59
11.	"Get Outta My Heart"	Koci; Love	Walter; Jason Evigan; Bernard Herrmann	Cirkut; Evigan	3:00
12.	"Cold as Ice"	Koci; Love	C. McDonough; Riley McDonough; Jakke Erixson; Walter	Cirkut; C. McDonough; T.I. Jakke; Tor Eimon^{[a]}	2:23
13.	"Last Night on Earth"	Koci; Love	C. McDonough; Erixson; Walter	Cirkut; C. McDonough	2:57
14.	"Dancing's Done"	Koci; Douglas	Pablo Bowman; Burns; Rycroft; Walter	Lostboy; Burns; Cirkut^{[v]}	2:46
Total length:					39:31

Diamonds & Dancefloors – Japanese CD edition bonus tracks
No.	Title	Lyrics	Music	Producer(s)	Length
15.	"Maybe You're the Problem" (MOTi remix)	Koci; Douglas	Lomax; Dertner; Walter; Jeberg	Cirkut; Jeberg; Dertner^{[c]}	2:47
16.	"Million Dollar Baby" (Coastr remix)	Koci; Agombar	Stewart; Pollack; Rycroft; Walter; Warren	Cirkut; Lostboy; Stewart	2:41
Total length:					45:10

=== Notes ===
- ^{^[c]} signifies a co-producer.
- ^{^[a]} signifies an additional producer.
- ^{^[v]} signifies a vocal producer.
- "Million Dollar Baby" contains an interpolation of "Can't Fight the Moonlight" (2000), as written by Diane Warren and performed by LeAnn Rimes.
- "Get Outta My Heart" contains sampled elements from the Twisted Nerve score (1968), composed by Bernard Herrmann.

== Personnel ==
Musicians

- Ava Max – vocals
- Cirkut – all instruments, programming (tracks 1–5, 7–13)
- David Stewart – all instruments, programming (1)
- Abraham Dertner – all instruments, programming (2, 3)
- Jonas Jeberg – all instruments, programming (2, 3)
- Johnny Goldstein – all instruments, programming (5)
- Omer Fedi – all instruments, programming (8)
- Connor McDonough – all instruments, programming (9, 12, 13)
- Burns – all instruments, programming (10)
- Jason Evigan – all instruments, programming (11)
- Jakke Erixson – all instruments, programming (12)

Technical

- Chris Gehringer – mastering
- Tom Norris – mixing (1, 2, 4–13)
- Serban Ghenea – mixing (3, 14)
- John Hanes – engineering (14)
- Bryce Bordone – mixing assistance (3, 14)

== Charts ==
=== Weekly charts ===
Weekly chart performance for Diamonds & Dancefloors
Chart (2023–2024)	Peak position
Australian Albums (ARIA)	31
Austrian Albums (Ö3 Austria)	6
Belgian Albums (Ultratop Flanders)	11
Belgian Albums (Ultratop Wallonia)	15
Canadian Albums (Billboard)	23
Croatian International Albums (HDU)	7
Dutch Albums (Album Top 100)	21
Finnish Albums (Suomen virallinen lista)	23
French Albums (SNEP)	14
German Albums (Offizielle Top 100)	8
Hungarian Albums (MAHASZ)	5
Irish Albums (Official Charts)	33
Italian Albums (FIMI)	50
Japanese Digital Albums (Oricon)	11
Japanese Hot Albums (Billboard Japan)	32
Lithuanian Albums (AGATA)	53
New Zealand Albums (RMNZ)	36
Norwegian Albums (VG-lista)	28
Polish Albums (ZPAV)	19
Portuguese Albums (AFP)	20
Scottish Albums (Official Charts)	6
Spanish Albums (Promusicae)	10
Swedish Albums (Sverigetopplistan)	54
Swiss Albums (Schweizer Hitparade)	8
UK Albums (Official Charts)	11
US Billboard 200	34
US Top Dance Albums (Billboard)	2

=== Year-end charts ===
2023 year-end chart performance for Diamonds & Dancefloors
Chart (2023)	Position
US Top Dance/Electronic Albums (Billboard)	24

== Release history ==
Diamonds & Dancefloors release history
Region	Date	Format(s)	Version(s)	Label	Ref.
Various	January 27, 2023	Cassette; CD; digital download; streaming; vinyl LP	Standard	Atlantic	
Brazil	January 27, 2023	CD	Standard	Warner	
Japan	January 27, 2023	CD	Japanese	Warner	
