= Cirkut =

Canadian record producer and songwriter (born 1986)

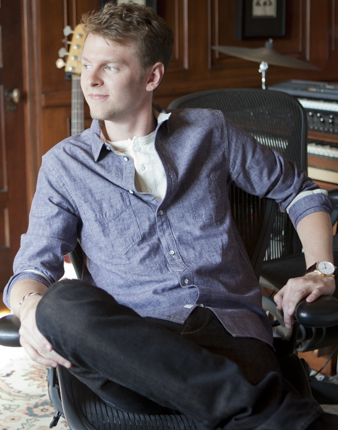
- Cirkut in 2015

Background information
- Born: Henry Russell Walter; 23 April 1986 (age 40); Ottawa, Ontario, Canada
- Origin: Toronto, Ontario, Canada
- Genres: Pop; R&B; hip hop
- Occupations: Record producer; songwriter

Henry Russell Walter (born April 23, 1986), known professionally as Cirkut, is a Canadian record producer and songwriter. He has produced and co-written commercially successful singles since 2008. His credits include songs and albums for prominent artists including Katy Perry, Becky G, Ava Max, Nicki Minaj, Lady Gaga, Charli XCX, R. City, The Weeknd, Kesha, Ciara, Pitbull, Britney Spears, Maroon 5, Ne-Yo, Rihanna, Adam Lambert, B.o.B, Marina and the Diamonds, will.i.am, Jung Kook, Kygo, Juicy J, Sam Smith, and Ed Sheeran, among others. He has numerous collaborations with American record producer Dr. Luke and Swedish producer Max Martin.

Walter has written and produced the Billboard Hot 100-number one singles "Part of Me", "Roar" and "Dark Horse" by Katy Perry, "Wrecking Ball" by Miley Cyrus, "Girls Like You" by Maroon 5, and "Starboy" and "Die for You (Remix)" by the Weeknd. He co-produced Jung Kook's 2023 single "Standing Next to You". He has co-written and produced every song on Becky G's Play It Again, R. City's What Dreams Are Made Of, Ava Max's Heaven & Hell and Diamonds & Dancefloors, and Lady Gaga's Mayhem.

Walter has won four Grammy Awards, including Best Urban Contemporary Album for the Weeknd's Starboy, Best Dance Pop Recording for Lady Gaga's "Abracadabra", Best Pop Vocal Album for Mayhem, and was named the 2026 Producer of the Year.

== Life and career ==
Walter was born in Ottawa and mostly lived in Montreal. In his teenage years he had moved to Halifax where he attended Armbrae Academy and St. Pat's High School in Halifax, Nova Scotia where he met some other musical artists. He then moved to Toronto in 2004. He co-produced the Britney Spears song "Mmm Papi" which appeared on her 2008 album Circus. He sent it as an instrumental track to Kobalt Music Group via their attorney Chris Taylor, where songwriter Nicole Morier began using it to write with Britney Spears.

Walter opened Dream House Studios in Toronto. He then relocated to Los Angeles, California. He co-produced "Part of Me", the title song to Katy Perry's 2012 concert film Katy Perry: Part of Me. Walter was also responsible for producing and co-writing the Weeknd's track "High for This". In 2016, he co-produced and co-wrote 9 songs on the Weeknd's album Starboy.

== Discography ==
Year	Title	Album	Writer	Producer	Remix
2008	"Mmm Papi"	Britney Spears – Circus	check	check	
2011	"Blow (Cirkut Remix)"	Kesha – I Am the Dance Commander + I Command You to Dance: The Remix Album	check	check	check
2011	"Seal It with a Kiss"	Britney Spears – Femme Fatale	check	check	
2011	"High for This"	The Weeknd – House of Balloons	check	check	
2011	"Wild Heart", "Where Do They Do That At?"	Sabi – All I Want	check	check	
2011	"Domino"	Jessie J – Who You Are	check	check	
2011	"Good Feeling"	Flo Rida – Wild Ones	check	check	
2011	"Hangover", "Tattoo"	Taio Cruz – TY.O	check	check	
2011	"You Da One", "Where Have You Been", "Fool in Love"	Rihanna – Talk That Talk	check	check	
2011	"Turn All The Lights On"	T-Pain – Revolver	check	check	
2012	"Never Close Our Eyes", "Better Than I Know Myself"	Adam Lambert – Trespassing	check	check	
2012	"Part of Me", "Wide Awake"	Katy Perry – Teenage Dream: The Complete Confection	check	check	
2012	"Problem (The Monster Remix)"	Becky G – Hotel Transylvania Soundtrack	check	check	
2012	"Young Forever", "Va Va Voom", "Masquerade"	Nicki Minaj – Pink Friday: Roman Reloaded	check	check	
2012	"Brokenhearted"	Karmin – Hello	check	check	
2012	"Both of Us" (featuring Taylor Swift), "Strange Clouds" (featuring Lil Wayne), "Arena" (featuring T.I. & Chris Brown)	B.o.B – Strange Clouds	check	check	
2012	"Primadonna", "Lies", "How To Be A Heartbreaker"	Marina and the Diamonds – Electra Heart	check	check	
2012	"One More Time"	Baby E – N/A	check	check	
2012	"High For This"	The Weeknd – Trilogy	check	check	
2012	"Wish U Were Here" (featuring Becky G)	Cody Simpson – Paradise	check	check	
2012	"Rock Me"	One Direction – Take Me Home	check	check	
2012	"Oath" (featuring Becky G)	Cher Lloyd feat Becky G – Sticks + Stones	check	check	
2012	"Warrior", "Die Young", "C'mon", "Thinking of You", "Crazy Kids", "Wherever You Are", "Dirty Love", "Wonderland", "Only Wanna Dance With You", "Supernatural", "Gold Trans Am", "Last Goodbye"	Kesha – Warrior	check	check	
2012	"Till The World Ends (Twister Remix)"	Britney Spears – N/A	check	check	check
2012	"Die Young", "Supernatural"	Kesha – Deconstructed	check	check	
2013	"Fall Down" (featuring Miley Cyrus), "Far Away from Home" (featuring Nicole Scherzinger), "Geekin"	will.i.am – #willpower	check	check	
2013	"Ooh La La"	Britney Spears – Music From and Inspired by the Smurfs 2	check	check	
2013	"Vacation"	G.R.L. – Music From and Inspired by the Smurfs 2	check	check	
2013	"Walks Like Rihanna"	The Wanted – Word of Mouth	check	check	
2013	"Play It Again", "Can't Get Enough" (featuring Pitbull), "Zoomin' Zoomin", "Built for This", "Lovin' What You Do"	Becky G – Play It Again (EP)	check	check	
2013	"Roar", "Legendary Lovers", "Birthday", "Unconditionally", "Dark Horse" (featuring Juicy J), "International Smile", "Ghost"	Katy Perry – Prism	check	check	
2013	"Wrecking Ball"	Miley Cyrus – Bangerz	check	check	
2013	"Harder We Fall", "Excuse My Rude", "Gold"	Jessie J – Alive	check	check	
2013	"Smokin Rollin", "Bounce It"	Juicy J – Stay Trippy	check	check	
2013	"Give It 2 U"	Robin Thicke – Blurred Lines	check	check	
2013	"Brightest Morning Star"	Britney Spears – Britney Jean	check	check	
2013	"Timber" (featuring Kesha)	Pitbull – Global Warming: Meltdown	check	check	
2014	"Show Me What You Got", "Ugly Heart", "Rewind"	G.R.L. – G.R.L.	check	check	
2014	"Quiero Bailar (All Through The Night)"	3BallMTY – Globall	check	check	
2014	"Dare (La La La)"	Shakira – Shakira	check	check	
2014	"La La La (Brazil 2014)"	Shakira – One Love, One Rhythm - The 2014 FIFA World Cup Official Album	check	check	
2014	"We Are One (Ole Ola)" (featuring Jennifer Lopez & Claudia Leitte)	Pitbull – One Love, One Rhythm - The 2014 FIFA World Cup Official Album	check	check	
2014	"Wild Wild Love" (featuring G.R.L.)	Pitbull – Globalization	check	check	
2014	"Zipper"	Jason Derulo – Talk Dirty	check	check	
2014	"Shower", "Can't Stop Dancin'", "Can't Get Enough (Spanish Version)"	Becky G – N/A	check	check	
2014	"I Don't Mind"	Usher – N/A	check	check	
2014	"Get on Your Knees" (featuring Ariana Grande), "Only (featuring Drake, Lil Wayne & Chris Brown)", "Trini Dem Girls" (featuring LunchMoney Lewis), "The Night is Still Young", "Pills N Potions"	Nicki Minaj – The Pinkprint	check	check	
2014	"She Knows"	Ne-Yo – Non-Fiction	check	check	
2014	"Stayin Out All Night"	Wiz Khalifa – Blacc Hollywood	check	check	
2014	"Sugar"	Maroon 5 – V	check	check	
2014	"Low" (featuring Nicki Minaj, Lil Bibby and Young Thug),	Juicy J – The Hustle Continues	check	check	
2014	"Never Been in Love", "One More"	Elliphant – One More	check	check	
2014	"Completement Fou", "Coca Sans Bulles", "Florence En Italie", "Un Jour Viendra"	Yelle – Complètement fou	check	check	
2015	"This Is How We Roll"	Fifth Harmony – Reflection	check	check	
2015	"Lighthouse"	G.R.L. – N/A	check	check	
2015	"For Everybody"	Juicy J, Wiz Khalifa, R. City – N/A	check	check	
2015	"Dance Like We're Makin' Love", "Give Me Love", "Lullaby", "Kiss N Tell", "Special Edition"	Ciara – Jackie	check	check	
2015	"Best People in the World"	Elliphant – N/A	check	check	
2015	"The Water Dance"	Chris Porter – The Water Dance	check	check	
2015	"Once in a Lifetime"	Flo Rida – My House	check	check	
2015	"Like This", "Locked Away" (featuring Adam Levine), "Checking for You", "Take You Down", "Broadway", "Over", "Make Up", "Again", "Live by the Gun", "Slave to the Dollar", "Save My Soul", "Crazy Love", "Don't You Worry", "Our Story"	R. City – What Dreams Are Made Of	check	check	
2015	"Marching Band" (featuring Juicy J)	R. Kelly – The Buffet	check	check	
2015	"Lovin' So Hard", "Break a Sweat", "You Love It"	Becky G – N/A	check	check	
2015	"Everybody" (featuring Azealia Banks), "Love Me Badder"	Elliphant – Living Life Golden	check	check	
2015	"Whip It!" (featuring Chloe Angelides), "Ain't Too Cool"	Lunchmoney Lewis – N/A	check	check	
2015	"Silk Road"	Rick Ross – Black Market	check	check	
2016	"Ain't Your Mama"	Jennifer Lopez – N/A	check	check	
2016	"Tabú"	Pablo Alborán, Ava Max – Tabú		check	
2016	"Greenlight" (featuring Flo Rida & LunchMoney Lewis)	Pitbull – Climate Change	check	check	
2016	"Guys My Age"	Hey Violet – From the Outside	check		
2016	"Starboy" (featuring Daft Punk), "False Alarm", "Reminder", "Secrets", "Six Feet Under", "Ordinary Life", "Nothing Without You", "I Feel It Coming" (featuring Daft Punk)	The Weeknd – Starboy	check	check	
2016	"Bang Bang" (featuring R. City, Selah Sue and Craig David)	DJ Fresh, Diplo – N/A	check		
2017	"Another Love Song"	Ne-Yo – N/A	check	check	
2017	"I Don't Want It at All", "Slow It Down"	Kim Petras – N/A	check	check	
2017	"All Night" (featuring LunchMoney Lewis)	Big Boi – Boomiverse	check	check	
2017	"Ugly"	Jaira Burns – N/A	check	check	
2017	"A Little Work"	Fergie – Double Dutchess	check	check	
2018	"Girls Like You" (featuring Cardi B)	Maroon 5 – Red Pill Blues	check	check	
2018	"Savior" (featuring Quavo)	Iggy Azalea – N/A	check	check	
2018	"Hurt You" (featuring Gesaffelstein)	The Weeknd – My Dear Melancholy	check	check	
2018	"Heart to Break", "Can't Do Better", "All the Time"	Kim Petras – N/A	check	check	
2018	"Any Weather"	Birdman – Birdman presents: Before Anythang (Soundtrack)	check	check	
2018	"Nights Like These", "On Ur Mind", "Ocean Sure"	Ne-Yo – Good Man	check	check	
2018	"Animal", "Priceless"	Trey Songz – Tremaine the Album	check	check	
2018	"Come See About Me"	Nicki Minaj – Queen	check	check	
2018	"Creep on Me" (featuring French Montana & DJ Snake)	Gashi – Gashi	check	check	
2018	"Treasure Island"	Azealia Banks – Fantasea II: The Second Wave	check	check	
2018	"Sweet but Psycho"	Ava Max – Heaven & Hell	check	check	
2019	"So Am I", "Torn", "Salt"	Ava Max – Heaven & Hell	check	check	
2020	"Kings & Queens", "Who's Laughing Now", "OMG What's Happening", "Heaven", "Naked", "Tattoo", "Call Me Tonight", "Born to the Night", "Take You to Hell", "Belladonna", "Rumors", "My Head & My Heart"	Ava Max – Heaven & Hell	check	check	
2020	"On Me" (featuring Ava Max)	Thomas Rhett, Kane Brown – SCOOB! The Album	check	check	
2021	"EveryTime I Cry"	Ava Max – N/A	check	check	
2021	"Let you"	Iann Dior – On to Better Things	check	check	
2021	"Echo" (featuring blackbear), "One Light" (featuring Bantu), "Convince Me Otherwise" (with H.E.R.)	Maroon 5 - Jordi	check	check	
2021	"Hurricane"	Kanye West – Donda	check	check	
2021	"Tears in the Club"	FKA twigs – Caprisongs	check	check	
2022	"House on Fire"	Mimi Webb – Amelia	check	check	
2022	"Hold Me Closer"	Elton John and Britney Spears – The Lockdown Sessions		check	
2022	"Maybe You're the Problem", "Million Dollar Baby", "Weapons", "Dancing's Done"	Ava Max – Diamonds & Dancefloors	check	check	
2022	"Star Walkin' (League of Legends Worlds Anthem)"	Lil Nas X – Star Walkin' (League of Legends Worlds Anthem)	check	check	
2022	"Everything to Everyone" and "Moon"	Reneé Rapp –Everything to Everyone	check	check	
2022	"Press It (Fast & Furious Drift Tape/Phonk Vol 1)"	Bludnymph	check	check	
2022	"Disaster"	Conan Gray – Superache	check	check	
2022	"Unholy" (with Kim Petras)	Sam Smith – Gloria	check	check	
2023	"Lose You", "How to Cry"	Sam Smith – Gloria	check		
2023	"Sleepwalker", "Ghost", "Hold Up (Wait a Minute)", "Diamonds & Dancefloors", "In the Dark", "Turn Off the Lights", "One of Us", "Get Outta My Heart", "Cold as Ice", "Last Night on Earth"	Ava Max – Diamonds & Dancefloors	check	check	
2023	"Red Flags"	Mimi Webb – Amelia	check	check	
2023	"Lights Out", "Watch Me", "End of the World", "Grim Reaper"	Bludnymph	check	check	
2023	"Oral Hex (Spell on You)"	Bludnymph		check	
2023	"Bite Me"	Enhypen – Dark Blood	check	check	
2023	"King of Hearts", "Claws"	Kim Petras – Feed the Beast	check	check	
2023	"Seven"	Jung Kook feat. Latto – Golden	check	check	
2023	"Y.O.Universe"	Vcha – SeVit (New Light)	check	check	
2023	Vulgar	Sam Smith & Madonna – non-album single	check	check	
2024	"Drown", "My Favorite Drug", "Imagination", "Selfish", "Conditions"	Justin Timberlake – Everything I Thought It Was	check	check	
2024	"360", "Rewind", "365"	Charli XCX - Brat	check	check	
2024	"Brought The Heat Back"	Enhypen - Romance: Untold	check	check	
2024	"Wonder"	Katy Perry - 143	check	check	
2024	"APT." (with Bruno Mars), "Vampirehollie"	Rosé - Rosie	check	check	
2024	"Disease"	Lady Gaga - Mayhem	check	check	
2025	"It Girl"	JADE - That's Showbiz Baby	check	check	
2025	"Big Sleep," "Red Terror"	The Weeknd – Hurry Up Tomorrow	check	check	
2025	"Abracadabra", "Garden of Eden", "Perfect Celebrity", "Vanish into You", "Killah" (featuring Gesaffelstein), "Zombieboy", "LoveDrug", "How Bad Do U Want Me", "Don't Call Tonight", "Shadow of a Man", "The Beast", "Can't Stop the High", "Kill for Love", "The Dead Dance"	Lady Gaga - Mayhem	check	check	
2025	"Opening", "In Other Words", "A Little More"	Ed Sheeran - Play	check	check	
2025	"AEOMG"	Coco Jones- Why Not More?	check	check	
2026	"Squeak"	Bludnymph	check	check	
2026	"Go"	Blackpink - Deadline	check	check	
2026	"Goals", "Game Time", "Illuminate", "Three Nations", "In the Stars" (remix), "Blessings", "Lighter"	Various Artists - FIFA World Cup 2026 Official Album	check	check	
2026	"Runway" (with Doechii), "Shape of a Woman", "Glamorous Life"	Lady Gaga – The Devil Wears Prada 2	check	check	
2026	"Danceteria", "L.E.S. Girl", "Danceteria Afterhours"	Madonna – Confessions II	check	check	
2026	"superHuman"	AUDREY NUNA	check	check	

== Awards and nominations ==
Award ceremony	Year	Nominee/Work	Category	Result	Ref.
Grammy Awards	2014	"Roar"	Song of the Year	Nominated	
Grammy Awards	2018	Starboy	Best Urban Contemporary Album	Won	
Grammy Awards	2022	Donda	Album of the Year	Nominated	
Grammy Awards	2024	"Higher than Ever Before"	Best Dance/Electronic Recording	Nominated	
Grammy Awards	2025	Brat	Album of the Year	Nominated	
Grammy Awards	2025	"360"	Record of the Year	Nominated	
Grammy Awards	2026	Mayhem	Album of the Year	Nominated	
Grammy Awards	2026	Mayhem	Best Pop Vocal Album	Won	
Grammy Awards	2026	"Abracadabra"	Record of the Year	Nominated	
Grammy Awards	2026	"Abracadabra"	Song of the Year	Nominated	
Grammy Awards	2026	"Abracadabra"	Best Dance Pop Recording	Won	
Grammy Awards	2026	"APT."	Record of the Year	Nominated	
Grammy Awards	2026	"APT."	Song of the Year	Nominated	
Grammy Awards	2026	Cirkut	Producer of the Year, Non-Classical	Won	
Grammy Awards	2027	"Danceteria"	Best Dance Pop Recording	Pending	
Grammy Awards	2027	"Runway"	Best Song Written for Visual Media	Pending	
Juno Awards	2014	Cirkut	Songwriter of the Year	Nominated	
Juno Awards	2014	Cirkut	Producer of the Year	Won	
Juno Awards	2015	Cirkut	Songwriter of the Year	Nominated	
Juno Awards	2016	Cirkut	Producer of the Year	Nominated	
Juno Awards	2026	Cirkut	Producer of the Year	Won	
Primetime Emmy Awards	2026	"The Dead Dance"	Outstanding Original Music and Lyrics	Nominated	
