= Ava Max discography =

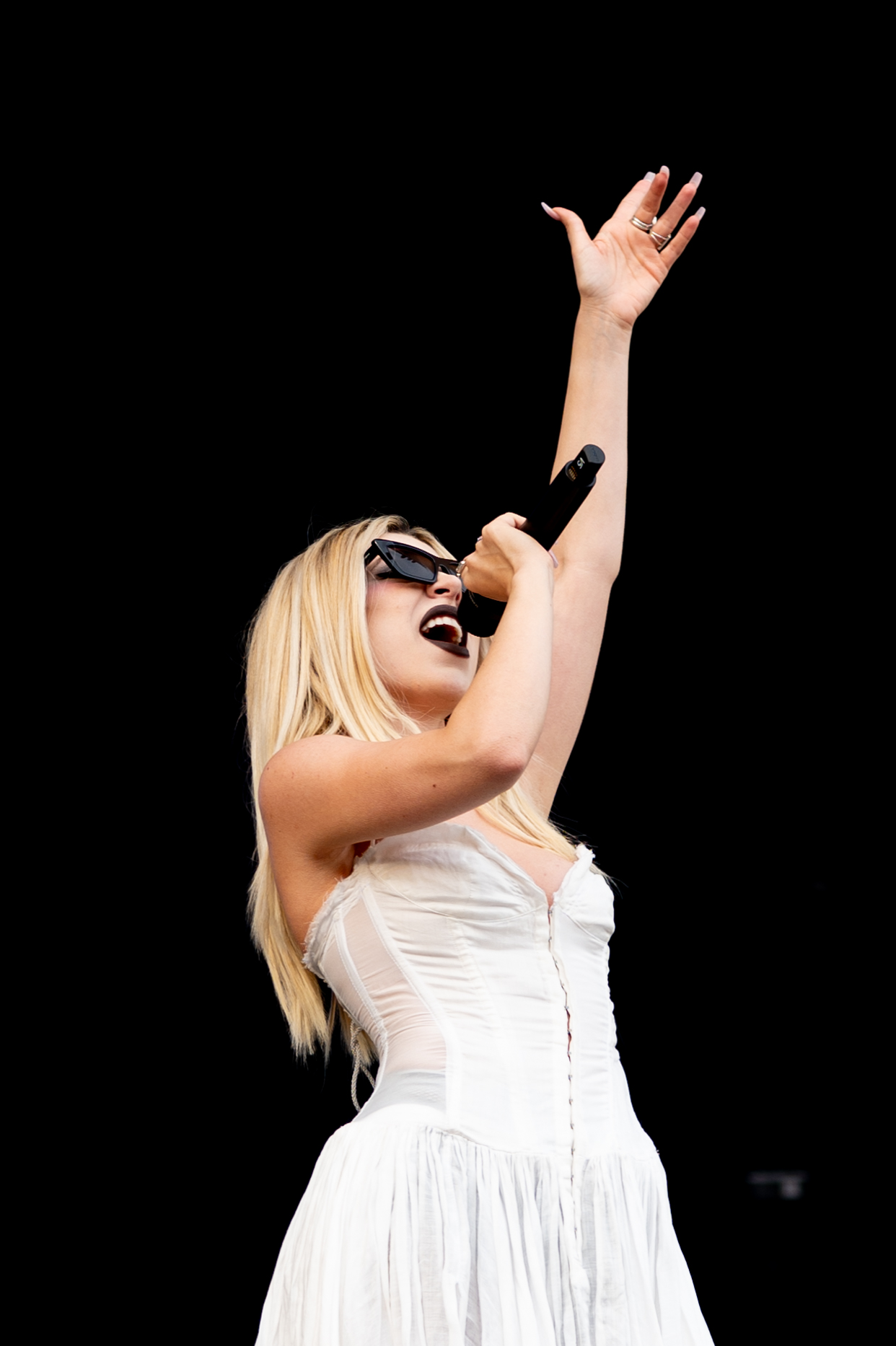
- Max in 2023
- Studio albums: 3
- EPs: 2
- Singles: 43
- Music videos: 24
- Promotional singles: 15

American singer Ava Max has released three studio albums, two extended play, 43 singles (including eight as a featured artist), 15 promotional singles and 24 music videos, as well as five visualizer music videos. According to Recording Industry Association of America, Max has sold 13 million digital singles and 1 million albums in the United States. In 2008, Max released an independent extended play on her Myspace profile titled Amanda Kay. She released "Take Away the Pain" under the stage name Ava in 2013, which was later produced by the Canadian duo Project 46 in 2015.

After signing with Atlantic Records in 2016, Max released "My Way" in April 2018 and "Slippin'" featuring Gashi in May 2018, both as promotional singles. Her debut single "Sweet but Psycho" was released in August 2018, which became Max's breakthrough hit, reaching number one in 22 countries including Sweden, Finland, Norway and the United Kingdom. It reached the top of the Billboard Dance Club Songs chart in January 2019, and charted at number 10 on the Billboard Hot 100. Max's next single, "So Am I", was released in March 2019.

Max's second studio album Diamonds & Dancefloors was released on January 27, 2023, preceded by singles such as "Maybe You're the Problem", "Million Dollar Baby", "Weapons", and "Dancing's Done". The album peaked at number 34 on the Billboard 200 chart and reached number eight in Germany. Her song "Whatever", produced by Kygo, was released in January 2024 and, in addition to reaching number one in Norway, it has also gone platinum in several countries.

Her third studio album Don't Click Play was released on August 22, 2025.

On February 25, 2026, Max released "Kill It Queen", which will serve as the lead single from Max's upcoming fourth studio album.

== Studio albums ==
List of studio albums, showing release date, label, chart positions and certifications
Title	Details	Peak chart positions										Certifications
Title	Details	US	AUS	AUT	FRA	GER	NLD	NOR	SWE	SWI	UK	Certifications
Heaven & Hell	Release date: September 18, 2020; Label: Atlantic; Format: CD, LP, cassette, digital download, streaming	27	7	6	14	7	6	2	7	5	2	RIAA: Platinum; BPI: Gold; BVMI: Gold; IFPI AUT: Gold; IFPI NOR: 7× Platinum; SNEP: Platinum
Diamonds & Dancefloors	Release date: January 27, 2023; Label: Atlantic; Format: CD, LP, cassette, digital download, streaming	34	31	6	15	8	21	28	54	8	11	
Don't Click Play	Release date: August 22, 2025; Label: Atlantic; Format: CD, LP, digital download, streaming	—	—	27	80	59	—	—	—	28	—	
"—" denotes a recording that did not chart or was not released in that territory.

== Extended plays ==
List of extended plays, with release date and label shown
Title	Details
Amanda Kay (as Amanda Kay)	Released: September 12, 2008; Label: Denny Hits; Format: Digital download
A Sweet but Psycho Halloween	Released: October 27, 2022; Label: Atlantic; Format: Digital download

== Singles ==
=== As lead artist ===
List of singles as lead artist, showing year released, chart positions, certifications and album name
Title	Year	Peak chart positions										Certifications	Album
Title	Year	US	AUS	AUT	FRA	GER	NLD	NOR	SWE	SWI	UK	Certifications	Album
"Sweet but Psycho"	2018	10	2	1	8	1	4	1	1	1	1	RIAA: 4× Platinum; ARIA: 5× Platinum; BPI: 5× Platinum; BVMI: Diamond; IFPI AUT: 3× Platinum; IFPI NOR: 9× Platinum; IFPI SWI: 4× Platinum; NVPI: 2× Platinum; SNEP: Diamond	Heaven & Hell
"So Am I"	2019	— (Note: "So Am I" did not enter the US Billboard Hot 100, but peaked at number 5 on the Dance Club Songs chart.)	14	26	58	21	23	2	16	18	13	RIAA: Platinum; ARIA: 2× Platinum; BPI: Platinum; BVMI: Gold; IFPI AUT: Platinum; IFPI NOR: 3× Platinum; IFPI SWI: Platinum; SNEP: Platinum	Heaven & Hell
"Freaking Me Out"	2019	—	—	—	—	—	—	—	—	—	—		Non-album single
"Torn"	2019	—	— (Note: "Torn" did not enter the ARIA Singles Chart, but peaked at number 34 on the ARIA Digital Track Chart.)	60	106	59	—	—	—	28	87	IFPI AUT: Gold; IFPI SWI: Gold; SNEP: Gold	Heaven & Hell
"Tabú" (with Pablo Alborán)	2019	—	—	—	—	—	—	—	—	—	—		Non-album single
"Salt"	2019	—	—	8	38	10	35	5	33	8	—	RIAA: Gold; ARIA: Gold; BPI: Silver; BVMI: Platinum; IFPI AUT: 2× Platinum; IFPI NOR: 4× Platinum; SNEP: Platinum	Heaven & Hell
"Alone, Pt. II" (with Alan Walker)	2019	—	—	45	68	47	15	4	25	47	—	BPI: Silver; BVMI: Gold; GLF: Platinum; IFPI AUT: Platinum; IFPI NOR: 4× Platinum; SNEP: Platinum	World of Walker
"Kings & Queens"	2020	13	31	12	32	16	9	7	21	5	19	RIAA: 2× Platinum; BPI: 2× Platinum; BVMI: 3× Gold; IFPI AUT: 2× Platinum; IFPI NOR: 3× Platinum; SNEP: Diamond	Heaven & Hell
"Who's Laughing Now"	2020	—	—	60	68	65	55	8	63	34	93	IFPI AUT: Gold; IFPI NOR: Platinum; SNEP: Platinum	Heaven & Hell
"OMG What's Happening"	2020	— (Note: "OMG What's Happening" did not enter the US Billboard Hot 100, but peaked at number 39 on the Digital Song Sales component chart.)	—	—	—	—	—	32	72	65	—	IFPI NOR: Gold	Heaven & Hell
"Christmas Without You"	2020	—	—	28	—	23	69	—	— (Note: "Christmas Without You" did not enter the Swedish Singellista Chart, but peaked at number 16 on the Swedish Heatseeker Chart.)	32	43	BPI: Silver; BVMI: Gold	Non-album single
"My Head & My Heart"	2020	45	21	26	72	22	31	—	90	19	18	RIAA: Platinum; ARIA: Platinum; BPI: Platinum; BVMI: Gold; IFPI AUT: Platinum; IFPI NOR: Gold; SNEP: Platinum	Heaven & Hell (Note: "My Head & My Heart" only appears on the digital reissue of Heaven & Hell.)
"EveryTime I Cry"	2021	—	—	—	105	58	62	39	55	97	99	IFPI AUT: Gold; SNEP: Gold	Non-album single
"The Motto" (with Tiësto)	2021	42	22	10	60	10	5	11	21	5	12	RIAA: Platinum; ARIA: 2× Platinum; BPI: Platinum; BVMI: Platinum; IFPI AUT: 2× Platinum; IFPI NOR: Platinum; SNEP: Diamond	Drive
"Maybe You're the Problem"	2022	—	—	75	—	65	71	34	55	—	83	BPI: Silver	Diamonds & Dancefloors
"Million Dollar Baby"	2022	—	—	—	139	—	— (Note: "Million Dollar Baby" did not enter the Single Top 100, but peaked at number 22 on the Dutch Single Tip chart.)	—	67	—	— (Note: "Million Dollar Baby" did not enter the UK Singles Chart, but peaked at number 51 on the UK Singles Downloads Chart.)	SNEP: Gold	Diamonds & Dancefloors
"Weapons"	2022	—	—	—	—	—	—	—	54	95	—		Diamonds & Dancefloors
"Dancing's Done"	2022	—	—	—	—	—	—	—	— (Note: "Dancing's Done" did not enter the Swedish Singellista Chart, but peaked at number two on the Swedish Heatseeker Chart.)	—	—		Diamonds & Dancefloors
"One of Us"	2023	—	—	—	—	—	—	—	—	—	—		Diamonds & Dancefloors
"Ghost"	2023	—	—	—	—	—	—	—	—	—	—		Diamonds & Dancefloors
"Car Keys (Ayla)" (with Alok)	2023	—	—	—	—	—	37	—	76	—	—		Non-album single
"Choose Your Fighter"	2023	—	—	—	—	—	—	—	—	—	90		Barbie the Album
"Whatever" (with Kygo)	2024	— (Note: "Whatever" did not enter the US Billboard Hot 100, but peaked at number one on the Bubbling Under Hot 100.)	— (Note: "Whatever" did not enter the Australian Singles Chart but peaked at number eight on the ARIA Top 20 Dance Singles Chart.)	20	27	15	19	1	9	15	15	RIAA: Platinum; BPI: Platinum; BVMI: Gold; GLF: Platinum; IFPI AUT: Platinum; IFPI SWI: Platinum; SNEP: Diamond	Kygo
"My Oh My"	2024	—	—	—	—	—	—	38	73	—	— (Note: "My Oh My" did not enter the UK Singles Chart, but peaked at number 26 on the UK Singles Downloads Chart.)		Non-album singles
"Spot a Fake"	2024	—	—	—	—	—	—	—	— (Note: "Spot a Fake" did not enter the Swedish Singellista Chart, but peaked at number two on the Swedish Heatseeker Chart.)	—	— (Note: "Spot a Fake" did not enter the UK Singles Chart, but peaked at number 81 on the UK Singles Downloads Chart.)		Non-album singles
"Forever Young" (with David Guetta and Alphaville)	2024	90	81	36	37	10	29	—	70	34	—	IFPI SWI: Gold; SNEP: Platinum	Non-album singles
"1 Wish"	2024	—	—	—	—	—	—	—	— (Note: "1 Wish" did not enter the Swedish Singles Chart, but peaked at number five on the Swedish Heatseeker chart.)	—	—		Non-album singles
"Lost Your Faith"	2025	—	—	—	—	—	—	—	—	—	—		Don't Click Play
"Lovin Myself"	2025	—	—	—	—	—	—	—	—	—	—		Don't Click Play
"Wet, Hot American Dream"	2025	—	—	—	—	—	—	—	—	—	—		Don't Click Play
"Kill It Queen"	2026	—	—	—	—	—	—	—	—	—	—		TBA
"Out of Your Mind"	2026	—	—	—	—	—	—	—	—	—	—		TBA
"Fate" (with Alan Walker)	2026	—	—	—	—	—	—	—	—	—	—		TBA
"Before You Know It" (with Kygo)	2026	—	—	—	—	—	—	40	67	—	—		TBA
"Christmas Wonderland"	2026	—	—	—	—	—	—	—	—	—	—		TBA
"—" denotes a recording that did not chart or was not released in that territory.

=== As featured artist ===
List of singles as featured artist, showing year released, chart positions, certifications and album name
Title	Year	Peak chart positions							Certifications	Album
Title	Year	US	US Pop	US Dance	NZ Hot	SWE Heat.	UK	WW Excl. US	Certifications	Album
"Clap Your Hands" (Le Youth featuring Ava Max)	2017	—	—	—	—	—	—	—		Non-album singles
"Into Your Arms" (Witt Lowry featuring Ava Max)	2018	—	—	—	—	—	—	—	RIAA: 2× Platinum; BPI: Silver; IFPI NOR: Gold; SNEP: Gold	Non-album singles
"Make Up" (Vice and Jason Derulo featuring Ava Max)	2018	—	—	—	40	—	—	—		Non-album singles
"Slow Dance" (AJ Mitchell featuring Ava Max)	2019	—	28	—	—	—	—	—	RIAA: Gold	Slow Dance and Skyview
"Stop Crying Your Heart Out" (as BBC Radio 2 Allstars)	2020	—	—	—	—	—	7	114		Non-album singles
"Sad Boy" (R3hab and Jonas Blue featuring Ava Max and Kylie Cantrall)	2021	—	—	17	—	3	—	—		Non-album singles
"Baby It's Both" (Note: "Baby It's Both" also serves as the English version of "Tick-Tack" from Illit's second EP I'll Like You.) (Illit featuring Ava Max)	2024	—	—	—	—	—	—	—		Non-album singles
"Burn" (BigXthaPlug featuring Ava Max)	2026	70	—	—	25	—	—	—		Better Over Time
"—" denotes a recording that did not chart or was not released in that territory.

=== Promotional singles ===
List of promotional singles, showing year released, chart positions, certifications and album name
Title	Year	Peak chart positions						Certifications	Album
Title	Year	US Dig.	US Dance	US Country Dig.	CAN	CZE Air.	NZ Hot	Certifications	Album
"Take Away the Pain"	2013	—	—	—	—	—	—		Non-album promotional singles
"Satellite"	2013	—	—	—	—	—	—		Non-album promotional singles
"Spinning Around"	2015	—	—	—	—	—	—		Non-album promotional singles
"Come Home"	2015	—	—	—	—	—	—		Non-album promotional singles
"Jet Set"	2016	—	—	—	—	—	—		Non-album promotional singles
"Anyone But You"	2016	—	—	—	—	—	—		Non-album promotional singles
"My Way"	2018	—	—	—	—	—	—		Non-album promotional singles
"Slippin'" (featuring Gashi)	2018	—	—	—	—	—	—		Non-album promotional singles
"Not Your Barbie Girl" (Note: "Not Your Barbie Girl" only appears on the Japanese edition of Heaven & Hell.)	2018	—	—	—	—	—	—		Non-album promotional singles
"Blood, Sweat & Tears"	2019	—	—	—	—	60	—		Non-album promotional singles
"On Somebody"	2019	—	—	—	—	—	35		Non-album promotional singles
"On Me" (Thomas Rhett and Kane Brown featuring Ava Max)	2020	50	—	18	91	—	—	RIAA: Gold	Scoob! The Album
"Naked"	2020	—	—	—	—	—	38		Heaven & Hell
"Cold as Ice"	2023	—	26	—	—	—	—		Diamonds & Dancefloors
"Brought the Heat Back" (with Enhypen)	2024	—	—	—	—	—	—		Romance: Untold
"Work"	2026	—	—	—	—	—	—	—	Paw Patrol: The Dino Movie
"—" denotes a recording that did not chart or was not released in that territory. "*" denotes that the chart did not exist at that time.

== Other charted songs ==
List of other charted songs, showing year released, with selected chart positions and album name
Title	Year	Peak chart positions						Album
Title	Year	US Dance	US Rhy.	BLR Air.	HUN	HUN Air.	NZ Hot	Album
"Take You to Hell"	2020	—	—	*	19	—	—	Heaven & Hell
"Diamonds & Dancefloors"	2023	25	—	—	—	—	—	Diamonds & Dancefloors
"Turn Off the Lights"	2023	37	—	—	—	—	—	Diamonds & Dancefloors
"Get Outta My Heart"	2023	32	—	—	—	—	—	Diamonds & Dancefloors
"One Night"	2023	—	—	—	—	5	—	Unreleased
"Tear Me Down" (Joyner Lucas featuring Ava Max)	2025	—	38	—	—	—	30	ADHD 2
"How Can I Dance"	2025	—	—	175	—	—	—	Don't Click Play
"Catch My Breath"	2025	—	—	200	—	—	—	Don't Click Play
"—" denotes a recording that did not chart or was not released in that territory. "*" denotes that the chart did not exist at that time.

== Guest appearances ==
List of other appearances, showing year released, with selected chart positions, other artist(s) credited and album name
Title	Year	Other artist(s)	Peak chart positions	Album
Title	Year	Other artist(s)	LAT Air.	Album
"Take Away the Pain" (as Ava Koci)	2015	Project 46	*	Beautiful
"Let It Be Me"	2018	David Guetta	—	7
"Tear Me Down"	2025	Joyner Lucas	—	ADHD 2
"Energy"	2026	Bia	6	Official FIFA World Cup 2026 Album
"—" denotes a recording that did not chart or was not released in that territory. "*" denotes that the chart did not exist at that time.

== Music videos ==
List of music videos, showing year released, other artist(s) credited and director(s)
Title	Year	Other artist(s)	Director(s)	Ref.
As lead artist
"Take Away the Pain"	2013	None	Ava Max	
"My Way"	2018	None	Jake Wilson	
"Sweet but Psycho"	2018	None	Shomi Patwary	
"So Am I"	2019	None	Isaac Rentz	
"Torn"	2019	None	Joseph Kahn	
"Freaking Me Out"	2019	None	Edgar Daniel	
"Tabú"	2019	Pablo Alborán	Santiago Salviche	
"Alone, Pt. II"	2019	Alan Walker	Kristian Berg	
"Kings & Queens"	2020	None	Isaac Rentz	
"Who's Laughing Now"	2020	None	Isaac Rentz	
"Naked"	2020	None	Hannah Lux Davis	
"OMG What's Happening"	2020	None	Hannah Lux Davis	
"My Head & My Heart"	2021	None	Charm La'Donna and Emil Nava	
"EveryTime I Cry"	2021	None	Ava Max and Charlotte Rutherford	
"The Motto"	2021	Tiësto	Christian Breslauer	
"The Motto, Part II"	2021	Tiësto	Christian Breslauer	
"Maybe You're the Problem"	2022	None	Joseph Kahn	
"Million Dollar Baby"	2022	None	Andrew Donoho	
"Christmas Without You"	2022	None	Ava Max	
"Dancing's Done" (Visualizer)	2022	None	Unknown	
"One of Us" (Visualizer)	2023	None	Unknown	
"Weapons" (Visualizer)	2023	None	Unknown	
"Ghost" (Visualizer)	2023	None	Unknown	
"Car Keys (Ayla)"	2023	Alok	Adrian Villagomez	
"Whatever"	2024	Kygo	Dano Cerny	
"My Oh My"	2024	None	Hunter Moreno	
"Lost Your Faith" (Visualizer)	2025	None	Ava Max	
"Lost Your Faith"	2025	None	Claire Arnold	
"Lovin' Myself"	2025	None	Claire Arnold	
"Wet, Hot American Dream"	2025	None	Claire Arnold	
As featured artist
"Clap Your Hands"	2017	Le Youth	Rafatoon	
"Into Your Arms"	2018	Witt Lowry	Bobby Hanaford	
"Make Up"	2018	Vice and Jason Derulo	Isaac Rentz	
"Slow Dance"	2019	AJ Mitchell	Miles & AJ	
"On Me"	2020	Thomas Rhett and Kane Brown	Kyle Cogan	
"Stop Crying Your Heart Out"	2020	BBC Radio 2 Allstars	Phill Deacon	
