= Before You Know It (song) =

Single by Kygo and Ava Max
- Released: 16 October 2026
- Length: 2:53
- Label: Sony
- Songwriters: Jenson Vaughn; Kyrre Gørvell-Dahll; Amanda Ava Koci; Simon Klose; Ásdís
- Producer: Kygo

Kygo singles chronology
"Take Me Back" (2026)	"Before You Know It" (2026)

Ava Max singles chronology
"Burn" (2026)	"Before You Know It" (2026)	"Christmas Wonderland" (2026)

"Before You Know It" is a song by Norwegian DJ and music producer Kygo and American singer Ava Max. The song was released as a single on 16 October 2026, and marks the second collaboration between Kygo and Max, following the track "Whatever", which was released in 2024.

== Background ==
"Before You Know It" was produced by Kygo and released digitally on 16 October 2026. The song marks a reunion for the two artists following "Whatever". According to Vagalume, "Before You Know It" blends elements of tropical house, piano, dance beats and an upbeat chorus.

== Charts ==
=== Weekly charts ===
Weekly chart performance
Chart (2026)	Peak position
Belarus Airplay (TopHit)	182
Belgium (Ultratop 50 Flanders)	27
CIS Airplay (TopHit)	150
Croatia International Airplay (Top lista)	56
Czech Republic Airplay (ČNS IFPI)	49
Estonia Airplay (TopHit)	18
Germany Airplay (MusicTrace)	25
Japan Hot Overseas (Billboard Japan)	20
Lithuania Airplay (TopHit)	3
Moldova Airplay (TopHit)	56
Netherlands (Dutch Top 40)	29
New Zealand Hot Singles (RMNZ)	32
North Macedonia Airplay (Radiomonitor)	18
Norway (VG-lista)	40
Norway Airplay (IFPI)	77
Poland Airplay (OLiS)	39
Romania Airplay (TopHit)	166
Slovakia Airplay (ČNS IFPI)	46
Sweden (Sverigetopplistan)	67
Sweden Airplay (Radiomonitor)	5
UK Singles Downloads (Official Charts)	100
US Hot Dance/Electronic Songs (Billboard)	16

=== Monthly charts ===
Monthly chart performance
Chart (2026)	Peak position
Estonia Airplay (TopHit)	55
Lithuania Airplay (TopHit)	38
