= Blood, Sweat & Tears (disambiguation) =

Blood, Sweat & Tears are an American jazz-rock group.

Blood, Sweat & Tears may also refer to:

== Film and television ==
- Blood, Sweat and Tears (1986 film), a British television film by John Godber in the anthology series ScreenPlay
- "Blood, Sweat & Tears" (CSI: NY episode)

== Music ==
- Blood, Sweat and Tears (Johnny Cash album), 1963
- Blood, Sweat & Tears (Blood, Sweat & Tears album) (1968)
- Blood, Sweat & Tears (Ace Hood album)
- "The Blood, the Sweat, the Tears", a 1999 song by Machine Head from The Burning Red
- "Blood, Sweat and Tears", a 2004 song by V
- "Blood, Sweat and Tears", a 2014 song by Upon a Burning Body from The World Is My Enemy Now
- "Blood Sweat & Tears" (song), a 2016 song by BTS
- "Blood, Sweat & Tears" (Ava Max song), 2019

== See also ==
- Blood, toil, tears, and sweat, a phrase used in a 1940 speech by Winston Churchill
- "Blood & Tears", a song by Sentenced from The Cold White Light, 2002
