= Wet, Hot American Dream =

2025 single by Ava Max

Single by Ava Max

from the album Don't Click Play
- Released: July 1, 2025
- Genre: Pop; electropop
- Length: 2:57
- Label: Atlantic
- Songwriters: Alida Garpestad Peck; Amanda Ava Koci; JBach; Kyle Buckley
- Producers: David Stewart; Pink Slip

Ava Max singles chronology
| "Lovin Myself" (2025) | "Wet, Hot American Dream" (2025) | "Kill It Queen" (2026) |

Music video
- "Wet, Hot American Dream" on YouTube

"Wet, Hot American Dream" is a song by American singer-songwriter Ava Max. It was released on July 1, 2025, through Atlantic Records as the third and final single from her third studio album, Don't Click Play.

== Background ==
Max released the single ahead of her scheduled performance on the Macy's 4th of July Fireworks special. The track, released just days before the national holiday, aligns with the festive theme of the event; it was performed alongside artists such as the Jonas Brothers, Eric Church, Lenny Kravitz, Keke Palmer, and Trisha Yearwood.

== Composition ==
"Wet, Hot American Dream" is an upbeat, synthy track that blends bold sensuality with Americana imagery. In the chorus, Max sings, "Tell me all your dirty secrets / All your fantasies / I wanna be your blue jean, white tee, wet, hot American dream", a line that reflects the song's provocative tone, even if it is not necessarily tailored for network television. Stardust Magazine noted that the song is "unapologetically fun, and Lana-del-Rey-meets-Jessica-Simpson vibes covered in a modern electro-pop gloss", describing the song as "a neon-soaked anthem that oozes confidence and pop energy".

== Charts ==
=== Weekly charts ===
Weekly chart performance for "Wet, Hot American Dream"
| Chart (2025–2026) | Peak position |
|---|---|
| Argentina Anglo Airplay (Monitor Latino) | 15 |
| Croatia International Airplay (Top lista) | 84 |
| Czech Republic Airplay (ČNS IFPI) | 4 |
| Lithuania Airplay (TopHit) | 35 |
| Nicaragua Anglo Airplay (Monitor Latino) | 5 |
| South Korea BGM (Circle) | 78 |

=== Monthly charts ===
Monthly chart performance for "Wet, Hot American Dream"
| Chart (2025) | Peak position |
|---|---|
| Lithuania Airplay (TopHit) | 83 |
