= Kyle Buckley =

American musician

Pink Slip
- Also known as: Kyle Buckley
- Born: United States
- Genres: Pop, Future bass, Hip hop, Funk
- Occupations: Record producer, Songwriter, Mixing engineer, DJ, Musician

Kyle Buckley, known professionally as Pink Slip, is an American record producer, songwriter, mixing engineer, DJ, and musician. He has worked on songs for artists such as Fletcher, Christian French, Jason Derulo, Ava Max, Katseye, Kesha, K.Flay, Leven Kali, Dreamer Boy, Landon Sears, One Ok Rock, Kang Daniel, Royal & the Serpent, Blas Cantó, CIX, Hyomin, Yuju, Dava, and many others. He has also released a catalog of his own music alongside remixes of other artist's songs. His sound has been described as a crossover between pop, future bass, hip-hop, and funk.

== Early life ==
He started making music when he was 12 years old by watching YouTube videos and learning how to create beats.

== Discography ==
=== Extended plays ===
List of Extended Plays
Title	Details
Pink Motel	Released: March 10, 2017; Label: Big Beat Records; Format: Digital download
Project Pink	Released: June 30, 2018; Label: Independent; Format: Digital download

=== Singles ===
List of Singles
Title	Year	Album
"Said It All" (featuring Estef) [Marshall Magic Remix]	2018	Non-album single

=== Remixes ===
List of Remixes
Title	Year	Artist
"Sideline"	2017	Niia
"Game Plan" (featuring Jon Bellion)	2017	Ojivolta
"Head First" (Pink Slip x Inverness Remix)	2020	Christian French

=== Guest appearances ===
List of Guest Appearances
Title	Year	Artist	Album / Extended Play
"Plastic"	2017	StayLoose, MADI	StéLouse
"Secrets"	2018	William Bolton	Anti Love Love Songs
"More Than You Know"	2019	Anthony Russo	Dear You
"Jump Right In 2.0"	2019	NoMBe, Snny	They Might Even Loved Me (Re:Imagination)

== Production and songwriting credits ==
List of songs co-written and co-produced by Buckley for other artists.
Year	Song	Artist(s)	Album
2017	"Ms. Perfect"	Mayzin	Non-album single
2017	"Brand New Day"	Zach Taylor	Non-album single
2018	"XIBAL"	Sik-K	Non-album single
2018	"MANGO"	Hyomin	Non-album single
2018	"Secrets"	William Bolton	Anti Love Love Songs
2018	"Call Me"	William Bolton	Anti Love Love Songs
2018	"NAMANANA"	LAY	NAMANANA - The 3rd Album
2018	"Dry Eyes"	Phangs, Truitt	Happy Season
2019	"Anyway"	Estef	Nicotine
2019	"The One"	CIX	Hello Chapter 1: Hello, Stranger
2019	"Blackout"	CIX	Hello Chapter 2: Hello, Strange Place
2020	"Who U Are"	Kang Daniel	Magenta
2020	"Movie"	Kang Daniel	Magenta
2020	"BOOM"	Naomi Wang	No Day But Today
2020	"Hard to Say Goodbye"	Naomi Wang	No Day But Today
2020	"Roller Coaster"	Naomi Wang	No Day But Today
2020	"Move My Body"	CIX	Hello Chapter 3: Hello, Strange Time
2021	"State of Wonder"	Inverness	Non-album single
2021	"Round 2"	CIX	Hello Chapter Ø: Hello, Strange Dream
2021	"Everything"	CIX	Hello Chapter Ø: Hello, Strange Dream
2021	"The Weekend"	Bibi	Non-album single
2022	"Pose"	Loona	Flip That
2022	"Becky's So Hot"	Fletcher	Girl of My Dreams
2022	"AVA"	Natalie Jane	Where Am I?
2022	"Joy Ride"	Kang Daniel	Joy Ride
2023	"Glad You Came"	Jason Derulo	Non-album single
2023	"Supernova"	Kang Daniel	Realiez
2023	"Cinderella"	Exo	Exist
2023	"Ick"	Lay Bankz	Now You See Me
2023	"Hands on Me"	Jason Derulo	Nu King
2023	"Dancing With The Devil"	Jini	An Iron Hand in a Velvet Glove
2023	"Intrusive Thoughts"	Natalie Jane	Where Am I?
2023	"The Rizzness"	Taemin	Guilty
2023	"Bad Boy!"	Bella Poarch	Non-album single
2023	"Jungle"	TVXQ	20&2
2024	"No More (Ma Boy)"	Sistar19	Non-album single
2024	"ADHD"	Mae Stephens	Non-album single
2024	"Sugar Rush"	Bibi	Non-album single
2024	"it boy"	Bbno$	Bbno$
2024	"Tongue Out Freestyle"	Lay Bankz	After 7
2024	"Gas"	NCT 127	Walk
2024	"Spot a Fake"	Ava Max	Non-album single
2025	"Lost Your Faith"	Ava Max	Don't Click Play
2025	"Yippee-Ki-Yay" (feat. T-Pain)	Kesha	Period
2025	"Poppop"	NCT Wish	Poppop
2025	"Gnarly"	Katseye	Beautiful Chaos
2025	"Lovin Myself"	Ava Max	Don't Click Play
2025	"ATTENTION!" (feat. Slayyyter, Rose Gray)	Kesha	Period (...)
2025	"Let Love Go" (Jeongyeon, Momo, Sana, Tzuyu)	TWICE	This is For
2025	"Outside"	Enhypen	Desire: Unleash
2025	"Forever" (with Tom Grennan and Alna)	Illenium	Odyssey
2025	"Yezzir"	Bbno$	Bbno$
2025	"Gigolo"	Bbno$	Bbno$
2025	"Come to Brazil"	Bbno$	Bbno$
2026	"Sleep Tight"	Enhypen	The Sin: Vanish
2026	"Crown"	Exo	Reverxe
2026	"Different Girl"	Nmixx	Heavy Serenade
2026	"ORIGAMI!"	Kesha	Non-album single
2026	"Goals"	Lisa, Anitta & Rema	Official FIFA World Cup 2026 Album
2026	"World Cup (Champions)"	IShowSpeed	Official FIFA World Cup 2026 Album
2026	"Burger"	BBno$	Non-album single
