= Kill It Queen =

Single by Ava Max
- Released: February 25, 2026
- Genre: Pop
- Length: 2:48
- Label: Artist Partner
- Songwriters: Ava Max; Arthur Besna; Sam Martin; Jesse Aicer; Jakke Eriksen; Tor Eimon
- Producers: Arthur Besna; Jakke Eriksen; Tor Eimon

Ava Max singles chronology
"Wet, Hot American Dream" (2025)	"Kill It Queen" (2026)	"Out of Your Mind" (2026)

Lyric video
- "Kill It Queen" on YouTube

"Kill It Queen" (stylized as "KiLL iT QUEEN") is a song by American singer and songwriter Ava Max, released on February 25, 2026, through Artist Partner Group. It is her first release as an independent artist after departing from Atlantic Records. "Kill It Queen" is a pop song with the elements of dance-pop and electropop.

== Background and development ==
In 2025, Max released her third studio album, Don't Click Play, and it failed to chart on the US Billboard 200 chart. In support of the album, she planned the accompanying tour, Don't Click Play Tour; however, she canceled it later, wanting to refine it.

On February 11, Max suddenly cleared her Instagram page and posted a portrait of Elizabeth II, blowing pink-colored bubble gum against red background, stating: "God save the queen". Two days later, she uploaded a teaser of the single, with the caption stating: "So it begins". She posted another teaser video of the song with "Popmaxxing" caption on February 18, and that she left her previous record label, Atlantic Records. It was revealed that she had signed a record deal with American record label, Artist Partner Group. A day before of its release, Max announced a cover artwork, title and release date of "Kill It Queen". Serving as the first single from her upcoming fourth studio album, it marks her first release since 2026 and first as an independent artist.

== Composition ==
I'm telling my story my way. I'm doing things differently and it feels good. I feel empowered, reinvigorated, and I think you can hear it in this single. "Kill It Queen" is for anyone who wants to feel unstoppable.

— Ava Max, ABC Audio

Produced by Arthur Besna and Sam Martin, "Kill It Queen" is a pop song, featuring dance-pop elements along with "punchy synths and a glossy electropop backbone". Variety magazine described the track as a "self-empowerment anthem in a classic Max mold, a forceful pop tune that leans even harder into the towering sound of past singles".

== Personnel ==
Credits were adapted from Tidal.

- Ava Max – lead vocals, songwriter
- Arthur Bensa – songwriter, producer, recording engineer
- Jakke Erixson – songwriter, producer
- Sam Martin – songwriter, producer, background vocals
- Tor Eimon – songwriter, producer
- Jesse Aicher – songwriter
- Mike Caren – A&R manager
- Roxy Silver – A&R manager
- Andromaqi Koci – background vocals
- Haven – background vocals
- Ohad Nissim – mastering engineer
- Patrizio "Teezio" Pigliapoco – mastering engineer

== Charts ==
=== Weekly charts ===
Weekly chart performance
Chart (2026)	Peak position
Belarus Airplay (TopHit)	91
CIS Airplay (TopHit)	27
Kazakhstan Airplay (TopHit)	12
Moldova Airplay (TopHit)	14
Romania Airplay (TopHit)	81
Russia Airplay (TopHit)	24

=== Monthly charts ===
Monthly chart performance
Chart (2026)	Peak position
CIS Airplay (TopHit)	59
Kazakhstan Airplay (TopHit)	17
Moldova Airplay (TopHit)	27
Russia Airplay (TopHit)	47

== Release history ==
List of release dates and formats
Region	Date	Format(s)	Label	Ref.
Various	February 25, 2026	Digital download; streaming	Artist Partner	
