= Don't Click Play =

Studio album by Ava Max
- Released: August 22, 2025
- Recorded: September 2023 – 2025
- Genres: Dance-pop; pop
- Length: 34:43
- Label: Atlantic
- Producers: Ammo; Leroy Clampitt; Fede; Frequency; Johnny Goldstein; Inverness; Lindgren; Pink Slip; Re\mind; David Stewart; Stryv

Ava Max chronology
Diamonds & Dancefloors (2023)	Don't Click Play (2025)

Singles from Don't Click Play
- 1. "Lost Your Faith" Released: February 7, 2025; 2. "Lovin Myself" Released: May 29, 2025; 3. "Wet, Hot American Dream" Released: July 1, 2025

Don't Click Play is the third studio album by American singer-songwriter Ava Max. It was released on August 22, 2025, through Atlantic Records. Following up to her 2023 album Diamonds & Dancefloors, the album was promoted by the release of three singles: "Lost Your Faith", "Lovin Myself" and "Wet, Hot American Dream". Development of the album began in late 2023, though an initial version was later scrapped. In the lead-up to release, Max adopted a relatively low promotional profile, with the album rollout drawing attention for its minimal activity and the cancellation of her accompanying tour.

Primarily a dance-pop and pop record, Don't Click Play incorporates themes of empowerment, online criticism, and personal growth, while also addressing long-standing comparisons to American singer Lady Gaga. Upon release, it received mixed reviews: critics praised its listenable dance-pop style but noted a lack of cohesion and innovation compared to her earlier work. Commercially, the album debuted in the top 30 in Austria, Belgium, Hungary, and Switzerland, while reaching charts in twelve countries overall.

== Background and development ==
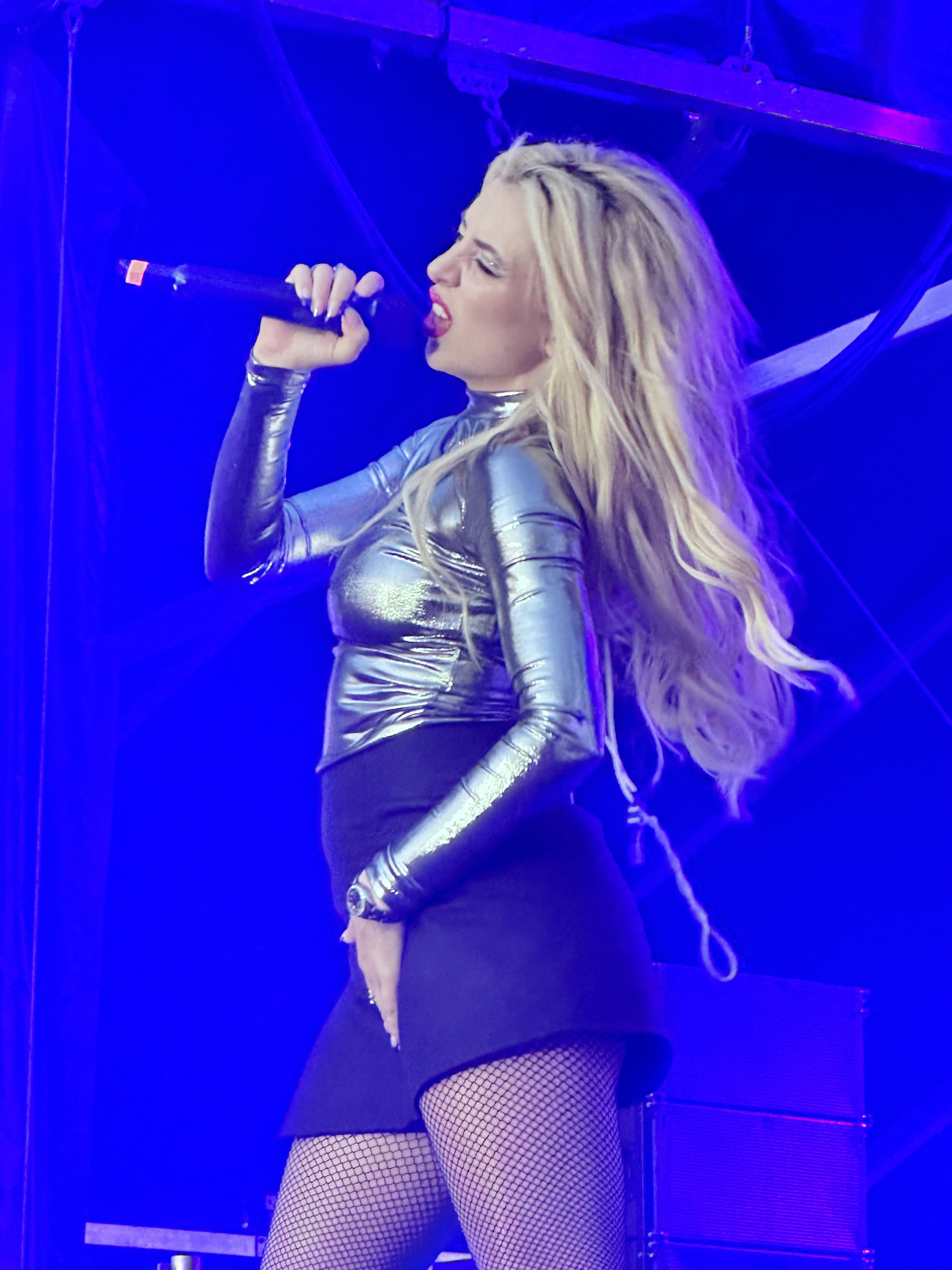
Max at the 2024 Capital Pride Festival, where she performed a setlist of songs including "My Oh My".

In 2023, Max released her second studio album, Diamonds & Dancefloors, and embarked on her debut headlining concert tour, On Tour (Finally). In September, she started working on her third studio album after the end of the tour. In March 2024, Max posted a snippet of her single "My Oh My" and indicated that it was the beginning of a new era. In an interview with Billboard the following May, she stated that she was preparing for her third album cycle "with no heartbreak attached and no man attached," describing "My Oh My" as "the beginning of me" and reflecting on a period of personal healing. The song was initially intended to serve as the lead single of her third studio album; however, after the release of her single "Spot a Fake" on September 20, she revealed that only the latter would be included on the album. Nevertheless, in an interview with People, Max mentioned that she scrapped the first version of the album — which included "My Oh My" and "Spot a Fake" — due to personal issues.

In the months leading up to the release, Max's promotional activity was notably limited. After a Fourth of July performance and the release of a single on July 1, she largely withdrew from social media, sharing little about the project. Despite her absence online, sources confirmed to Rolling Stone that Don't Click Play remained scheduled for release on August 22, 2025. The publication also reported the album's 12-track listing and credits, which included production from Pink Slip, Inverness, David Stewart, Johnny Goldstein, Ammo, and Fede. Leading up to the album, Max released three singles: "Lost Your Faith" in February, "Lovin Myself" in May, and "Wet, Hot American Dream" in July. Each was accompanied by a music video, though promotion was minimal. Unlike her previous albums Heaven & Hell (2020) and Diamonds & Dancefloors (2023), both of which were delayed due to leaks, Don't Click Play was released as planned.

On August 19, 2025, however, the title track's snippet was leaked online prior to its official release. The lyrics include a self-referential line which addresses long-standing comparisons between Max and American singer Lady Gaga, with the singer incorporating nods to her own song "Kings & Queens" (2020) and Gaga's "Poker Face" (2008). Max had previously spoken about such comparisons in interviews, telling Nylon in 2023, she said that while some commentary felt "kind of mean", she ultimately found the comparisons flattering, joking that "who doesn't love Gaga?!" and noting that changing her appearance had only shifted comparisons to other artists like English singer Dua Lipa. In May 2025, she told People that she intentionally avoided outside influences when making Don't Click Play, describing her process as introspective and rooted in rediscovering her pop sensibilities. "I feel like there's a lot of 'Kings & Queens'-feeling songs on the album", she said, framing the project as a return to her musical beginnings.

== Composition ==
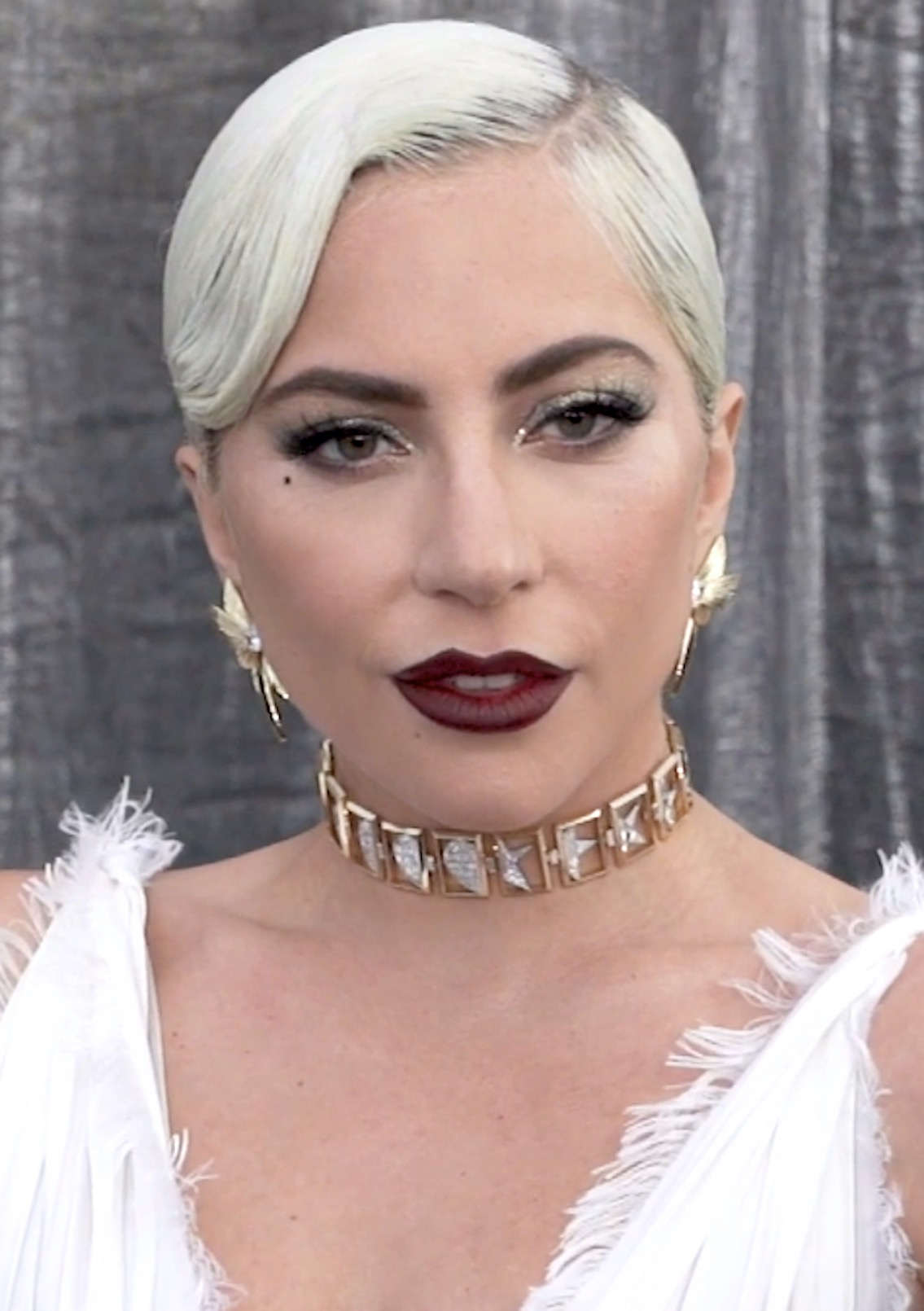
Max addresses comparisons to American singer Lady Gaga (pictured) on the title track of the album.

Don't Click Play is a pop album that contains dance-pop tracks, featuring what Matthew Dwyer of PopMatters described as "heavy synths, thumping basslines, and skittering beats" that support "lyrically thin premises". Max explained that the album was created both as a personal challenge and as proof that she could craft pop songs independently of her past collaborators. She further noted that it reflects a variety of moods from the year-and-a-half recording process, with each track designed to be distinct while still contributing to an overarching story. Lyrically, the record touches on themes of self-empowerment, online criticism, and recovery from heartbreak.

"Don't Click Play"
A-17 second of the title track, which features Max singing about comparisons to Lady Gaga

The title track addresses comparisons to Lady Gaga and sampling controversies, while songs such as "Know Somebody" draw from her experiences with difficult breakups. Max emphasized that the project represents both her musical evolution and her desire to create an album that "feeds the soul". On Rolling Stone, she described "Lovin Myself" as stemming from a realization about self-acceptance and personal growth. In the track, Max addresses criticism through self-referential lyrics, singing, "She samples, singing Gaga imitations / Can't kings and queens look good with poker faces?", which nods to both her single "Kings & Queens" and Lady Gaga's "Poker Face". She later reinforces the song's defiant tone by declaring, "But I'm loving myself even if you hate it". According to Rolling Stone, Max confirmed that the circulating snippet is authentic and originates from the title track of Don't Click Play.

== Promotion ==
On April 9, 2025, Max shared a link to a website called "Don't Click Play on Ava Max", where visitors could click a "Sign the Petition" button and listen to a snippet of an upcoming album single. She announced the album Don't Click Play on May 1, by quoting English singer Ed Sheeran's announcement of his eighth studio album, Play, on X. Other songs were confirmed for the album including "How Can I Dance", "Take My Call", "Skin in the Game", and "World's Smallest Violin", in addition to the previously released singles. A cover artwork of Don't Click Play features Max inside a flaming triangle resembling a play button, gripping its edges.

=== Singles ===
On February 7, 2025, Max released "Lost Your Faith" as the lead single of Don't Click Play. An accompanying music video was released on March 18. On May 23, Max teased the second single from the album via her social media, "Lovin Myself", released on May 29. On July 1, Max released the third single, "Wet, Hot American Dream", ahead of her scheduled performance on the Macy's 4th of July Fireworks special. Released just days before the national holiday, it aligned with the festive theme of the event, where she performed alongside artists such as the Jonas Brothers, Eric Church, Lenny Kravitz, Keke Palmer, and Trisha Yearwood.

=== Tour ===
On June 16, 2025, Max announced its accompanying tour, Don't Click Play Tour, set to begin on September 3 in Los Angeles and end on November 20 in Lisbon. However, the tour was canceled on July 3, since she believed that it did not satisfy her "standard that [she is] happy with".

== Critical reception ==
Professional ratings
Review scores
Source	Rating
AllMusic	2.5/5 stars
Jenesaispop	3.5/5 stars
PopMatters	5/10
Spectrum Culture	4/5 stars

Don't Click Play received mixed reviews from music critics, who found some tracks enjoyable but regarded it as her weakest effort to date. Neil Z. Yeung of AllMusic described Don't Click Play as a collection of enjoyable dance-pop tracks with some highlights, though noted it lacked the cohesion and impact of Max's earlier albums. Writing for Jenesaispop, Sebas E. Alonso described the album as "pleasant and agile in its half-hour runtime", highlighting the absence of ballads and calling it "one of its strong points". However, he noted that, despite the album's upbeat tone, Max's vocals often conveyed a sense of "sadness", concluding that Don't Click Play "is more the album Ava Max needed to record than the one the public needed". Laut.de author Yannik Gölz compared Don't Click Play's sounds to Dua Lipa's third studio album, Radical Optimism, calling it an "anonymous album" and regarding the album's title as "good advice".

== Commercial performance ==
In the United States, Don't Click Play became Max's first studio album to miss the Billboard 200 entirely, although it debuted at number twelve on the Top Dance Albums chart. In the United Kingdom, the album also missed the UK Albums Chart, while reaching number 28 on the Sales Chart. In Scotland, the album reached number 43 on the Scottish Albums Chart.

In Europe, Don't Click Play debuted at number 59 in Germany, being Max's first album to miss the top ten in the country. It reached number 80 in France, marking Max's lowest placing album in the country. Additionally, Don't Click Play reached the top 30 in Austria, Switzerland and the Wallonia region of Belgium, also making it Max's lowest charting album in the regions. In Hungary, the album reached at number 14. It also became Max's highest-charting album on the Croatian International Albums chart, and second top ten entry, where it debuted at number five.

In Asia, Don't Click Play reached number 26 on the Japanese Digital Albums chart and number 31 on the Japanese Album Downloads chart, becoming Max's second consecutive top 40 entry on the former.

== Track listing ==
Don't Click Play track listing
No.	Title	Writer(s)	Producer(s)	Length
1.	"Don't Click Play"	Amanda Ava Koci; Kyle Buckley; Sean Douglas; JBach	Pink Slip^{[p]}; Inverness^{[p]}	2:28
2.	"How Can I Dance"	Koci; Jim Lavigne; Buckley; JBach	Frequency; Pink Slip^{[p]}; Inverness^{[v]}	2:26
3.	"Lovin Myself"	Koci; Buckley; Lita Caputo; Scott Harris	Pink Slip^{[p]}	2:56
4.	"Sucks to Be My Ex"	Koci; Jason Evigan; Buckley; Marcus "MarcLo" Lomax; Douglas	Pink Slip^{[p]}	3:23
5.	"Wet, Hot American Dream"	Alida Garpestad Peck; Koci; JBach; Buckley	David Stewart^{[p]}; Pink Slip^{[p]}	2:56
6.	"Take My Call"	Koci; JBach; Johnny Goldstein; Sam Martin	Goldstein; Inverness^{[v]}	2:53
7.	"Know Somebody"	Amanda "Kiddo" Ibanez; Koci; Fede Vindver; JBach; Joshua Coleman; Buckley; Michael Pollack	Ammo; Fede; Inverness^{[v]}	3:25
8.	"Lost Your Faith"	Koci; Delacey; Leroy Clampitt; Lucy Healey	Clampitt; Pink Slip	3:14
9.	"Fight for Me"	Koci; Melanie Fontana; Michel "Lindgren" Schulz; Ryan Tedder	Lindgren; Inverness^{[v]}	2:35
10.	"Skin in the Game"	Koci; Bryan Fryzel; Jordan Powers; Kelsey Klingensmith; Lauren Mandel	Frequency; Inverness^{[v]}	2:49
11.	"World's Smallest Violin"	Koci; Arthur Remond; Hamid Bashir; Buckley	Pink Slip; Re\mind; Stryv	2:28
12.	"Catch My Breath"	Koci; Buckley; Harris	Pink Slip^{[p]}; Inverness^{[v]}	3:11
Total length:				34:48

=== Notes ===
- ^{^[p]} signifies a primary and vocal producer.
- ^{^[v]} signifies a vocal producer.

== Personnel ==
Credits were adapted from Tidal.

- Ava Max – vocals
- Serban Ghenea – mixing
- Chris Gehringer – mastering
- Bryce Bordone – mixing assistance
- Pink Slip – instrumentation (tracks 1–4, 8, 12), programming (1, 2, 4, 5, 8, 12), synthesizer (1, 3), background vocals (2, 5, 8)
- Jonathan Bach – background vocals (1, 2, 5)
- Lilian Caputo – background vocals (1, 3, 4)
- Inverness – programming (1)
- Alida Garpestad Peck – background vocals (2, 5)
- Frequency – instrumentation, programming (2)
- Anthony Watts – background vocals (4, 12)
- MarcLo – background vocals (4)
- David Stewart – background vocals, programming (5)
- Lucy Healey – background vocals (8)
- Rob Nelson – background vocals (8)
- Leroy Clampitt – bass, guitar, instrumentation, programming (8)
- Danny Shyman – guitar (8)
- Grant Sayler – guitar (8)

== Charts ==
Chart (2025)	Peak position
Austrian Albums (Ö3 Austria)	27
Belgian Albums (Ultratop Flanders)	58
Belgian Albums (Ultratop Wallonia)	25
Croatian International Albums (HDU)	5
French Albums (SNEP)	80
German Albums (Offizielle Top 100)	59
Hungarian Albums (MAHASZ)	14
Japanese Digital Albums (Oricon)	26
Japanese Download Albums (Billboard Japan)	31
Scottish Albums (OCC)	43
Spanish Albums (PROMUSICAE)	59
Swiss Albums (Schweizer Hitparade)	28
UK Albums Sales (OCC)	28
US Top Dance Albums (Billboard)	12
