= Fate (Alan Walker and Ava Max song) =

2026 single by Alan Walker and Ava Max

Single by Alan Walker and Ava Max
- Released: 26 June 2026
- Length: 3:09
- Label: World of Walker Music; Artist Partner Group
- Songwriters: Alan Walker; Ava Max; Frederik Borch Olsen; Gunnar Greve; James Njie; Kristin Marie; Marcus Arnbekk; Mats Lie Skåre; Sarah Solovay; Siri Elton
- Producers: Alan Walker; Chris Tek O'Ryan; James Njie

Alan Walker singles chronology
"The Sting Within Me" (2026)	"Fate" (2026)

Ava Max singles chronology
"Out of Your Mind" (2026)	"Fate" (2026)	"Work" (2026)

Lyric video
- "Fate" on YouTube

"Fate" (stylised in all caps) is a song by Norwegian DJ and record producer Alan Walker and American singer-songwriter Ava Max. It was released by World of Walker Music and Artist Partner Group on 26 June 2026. Both and Frederik Borch Olsen, Gunnar Greve, James Njie, Kristin Marie, Marcus Arnbekk, Mats Lie Skåre, Sarah Solovay, and Siri Elton co-wrote the song, while Walker, Chris Tek O'Ryan, and James Njie produced it.

== Background and composition ==
"Fate" marks Alan Walker and Ava Max's second collaboration, following their 2019 single, "Alone, Pt. II". Walker first performed "Fate" during a concert in Las Vegas on 25 May 2026. Prior to its announcement, the track reportedly generated over 100 million views and nearly 20 thousand videos on TikTok through a FIFA World Cup promotional campaign. Walker announced it on 17 June during a livestream in China, which attracted more than 5 million viewers and coincided with the song trending multiple times.

To promote "Fate", Walker hosted "Rise of Atlantis", a four-day livestream held from 23 to 26 July across multiple platforms. Broadcast from Norway, the event featured the live construction of a sand sculpture depicting the lost city of Atlantis, alongside tournaments, guest appearances, community activities and behind-the-scenes content. Donations raised during the livestream were directed to Beast Philanthropy's Project Ghana. The event also served as the launch of the "Legend of Atlantis" storyline, marking the beginning of the second season of Walker's "World of Walker", which he stated would expand into a future album, concert tour and video game.

"Fate" samples "O Fortuna" from Carl Orff's Carmina Burana. Writing for Maxim, Frank Tanner described the song as "grounded in a hypnotic orchestral melody", with Max's vocals "soaring majestically over a choir buttressed by dance floor beats".

== Personnel ==
Credits were adapted from Tidal.

- Alan Walker – producer, songwriting, programmer
- Ava Max – vocals, songwriting, background vocals
- Chris O'Ryan – producer
- James Njie – producer, songwriting, keyboards
- Kristin Marie – songwriting, background vocals
- Siri Elton – songwriting, background vocals
- Gunnar Greve – songwriting, keyboards
- Mats Lie Skåre – songwriting, keyboards
- Fredrik Borch Olsen – songwriting, programming
- Marcus Arnbekk – songwriting, programming
- Sarah Solovay – songwriting
- London Philarmonic Orchestra – orchestra
- London Philarmonic Choir – choir
- Mattias Bylund – choir, conductor
- Anna Byland – choir
- Anneli Axon – choir
- Erik Mjönes – choir
- Johanna Strombald Jonasson – choir
- Per Strandberg – choir
- David Parry – conductor
- Kasper – co-producer
- Manny Marroquin – mixing engineer
- Chris Galland – assistant mixing engineer
- Dave Kutch – mastering engineer

== Charts ==
Chart performance
Chart (2026)	Peak position
Italy Dance Airplay (EarOne)	13
Italy Independent Airplay (EarOne)	21
Italy International Airplay (EarOne)	45
Poland Airplay (OLiS)	25
Slovakia Airplay (ČNS IFPI)	43

== Release history ==
Region	Date	Format(s)	Label(s)	Ref.
Various	26 June 2026	Digital download; streaming	World of Walker Music; Artist Partner Group	
Italy	26 June 2026	Radio airplay	World of Walker Music; Artist Partner Group	
