= 1 Wish =

Single by Ava Max
- Released: October 31, 2024
- Genre: Christmas pop
- Length: 2:47
- Label: Atlantic
- Songwriters: Amanda Ava Koci; Nicholas Oliver Ruth; Peter Fenn; Rory Adams; Sophia Brenan
- Producers: Nick Ruth; Peter Fenn

Ava Max singles chronology
"Forever Young" (2024)	"1 Wish" (2024)	"Baby It's Both" (2024)

Lyric Video
- "1 Wish" on YouTube

"1 Wish" is a song by American singer-songwriter Ava Max, released on October 31, 2024, through Atlantic Records. Written by Max, Phia, Rory Adams and its producers Nick Ruth and Peter Fenn, it is her second Christmas song after "Christmas Without You" (2020).

== Live performances ==
Max performed "1 Wish" for the first time on The Wonderful World of Disney: Holiday Spectacular, which aired on December 1, 2024 on ABC. She also performed a cover of "O Holy Night". On December 2, she performed the song again on Jimmy Kimmel Live!.

== Charts ==
Chart performance for "1 Wish"
Chart (2024)	Peak position
Hungary (Editors' Choice Top 40)	36
New Zealand Hot Singles (RMNZ)	14
Poland (Polish Airplay Top 100)	54
South Korea BGM (Circle)	170
Sweden Heatseeker (Sverigetopplistan)	5
Sweden Airplay (Radiomonitor)	8

== Release history ==
Release dates and formats for "1 Wish"
Region	Date	Format(s)	Label	Ref.
Various	October 31, 2024	Digital download; streaming	Atlantic	
Italy	November 15, 2024	Radio airplay	Warner	
