= Out of Your Mind (Ava Max song) =

2026 single by Ava Max

Single by Ava Max
- Released: April 15, 2026
- Genre: Pop
- Length: 3:21
- Label: Artist Partner
- Songwriters: Arthur Besna; Jakke Erixson; Tor Eimon
- Producers: Arthur Besna; Ava Max; Jakke Erixson; Jesse Aicher; Liam Benayon; Naomi Robin; NoMe; Nick Lopez; Tor Eimon

Ava Max singles chronology
"Kill It Queen" (2026)	"Out of Your Mind" (2026)	"Fate" (2026)

Lyric video
- "Out of Your Mind" on YouTube

"Out of Your Mind" is a song by American singer and songwriter Ava Max, released on April 15, 2026, through Artist Partner Group. Arthur Besna, Jakke Erixson, and Tor Eimon wrote and co-produced the song with Ava Max, along with Liam Benayon, Naomi Robin, NoMe, and Nick Lopez.

== Background and promotion ==
After signing a record deal with American record label Artist Partner Group, Max released a single titled "Kill It Queen". It will be the first single from her upcoming fourth studio album. Before performing a Coachella in 2026, Max promoted a next single, "Out of Your Mind", through French magazine Elle. It was released on April 15, along with a lyric video.

== Composition ==
A pop song, "Out of Your Mind" features guitar-driven instrumentation and an uptempo beat. It incorporates transitions into falsetto ahead of the chorus, and it runs for three minutes and twenty-one seconds. Lyrically, the song addresses themes of self-determination and independence, with the narrator expressing a disregard for others' opinions.

Max described "Out of Your Mind" as a response to expectations that she conform to others' standards. She explained that the song reflects a period of personal reassessment, during which she sought change while remaining committed to her artistic identity. Max also compared its thematic direction to her earlier single "Sweet but Psycho", noting a renewed desire to prove herself and embrace a more uninhibited persona.

== Track listing ==
Digital download

1. "Out of Your Mind" – 3:21
2. "Kill It Queen" – 2:49

== Personnel ==
Credits were adapted from Tidal.

- Ava Max – lead vocals, producer
- Arthur Besna – songwriter, producer
- Jakke Erixson – songwriter, producer, background vocals
- Jesse Aicher – songwriter
- Liam Benayon – songwriter
- Naomi Robin – songwriter
- NoMe – songwriter
- Nick Lopez – songwriter
- Tor Eimon – songwriter, producer
- Sam Martin – background vocals
- Chris Gehringer – mastering engineer
- Jonny Grande – mixing engineer

== Release history ==
List of release dates and formats
Region	Date	Format(s)	Label	Ref.
Various	April 15, 2026	Digital download; streaming	Artist Partner	
