= Christmas Without You =

2020 single by Ava Max

Single by Ava Max
- Released: October 15, 2020
- Genre: Christmas pop
- Length: 2:49
- Label: Atlantic
- Songwriters: Amanda Ava Koci; Henry Walter; Gian Stone; Jesse Aicher; Sam Martin
- Producers: Cirkut; Stone

Ava Max singles chronology
"OMG What's Happening" (2020)	"Christmas Without You" (2020)	"My Head & My Heart" (2020)

Music video
- "Christmas Without You" on YouTube

"Christmas Without You" is a song by American singer-songwriter Ava Max, released on October 15, 2020, through Atlantic Records. It was written by Max, Jesse Aicher, Sam Martin, and producers Gian Stone and Cirkut. A Christmas pop song, it contains a piano, jingle bell and bassline, alongside Max's melisma and whistle register vocals. "Christmas Without You" received generally favorable reviews from music critics, who praised the Christmas sound and Max's vocal performance. The song peaked at number 28 on both the US Adult Contemporary chart and in Germany. A music video was released in 2022, which depicts Max in front of a winter-themed background.

== Composition ==
Musically, "Christmas Without You" is a Christmas pop song, which is bouncy, upbeat, and has a retro influence. The song begins with piano chords, which transitions into the first chorus with jingle bell sounds. During the next verse, a bassline is used with a basic beat and harmony, before leading to the second chorus. Max uses melisma throughout the vocal-driven ballad, which climaxes with a whistle register in the last chorus. Jerrett Franklin of Nashville Music Reviews stated that Max's vocals become stronger in the song, comparing her whistle register to Mariah Carey.

== Critical reception ==
Writing for Idolator, Mike Wass described "Christmas Without You" as a "feel-good festive anthem" with a "loved-up chorus", declaring the song as one of the best modern Christmas anthems. David Gleisner of Washington City Paper praised Max's vocals and songwriting, stating that the song evokes a positive emotion during Christmas.

== Promotion ==
The music video for "Christmas Without You" was released on December 17, 2022. Max sports symmetrical, long, blonde hair and a Christmas-styled red dress, while appearing in front of a winter-themed background.

== Personnel ==
Credits adapted from Tidal.

- Amanda Ava Koci – vocals, songwriting
- Henry Walter – production, engineering, songwriting, instruments, keyboards, programmer
- Gian Stone – production, bass, engineering, instruments, keyboards, programmer, songwriting
- Jesse Aicher – songwriting
- Sam Martin – songwriting
- Rafael Fadul – engineering
- Mark Schic – guitar
- Kurt Thum – keyboard
- Chris Gehringer – mastering
- Serban Ghenea – mixing
- John Hanes – mixing, engineering
- Yasmeen "YAS" Al-Mazeedi – strings

== Charts ==
Chart performance for "Christmas Without You"
Chart (2020–2025)	Peak position
Austria (Ö3 Austria Top 40)	28
Belgium (Ultratop 50 Flanders)	42
Belgium (Ultratip Bubbling Under Wallonia)	25
Croatia International Airplay (Top lista)	20
Czech Republic Airplay (ČNS IFPI)	52
Finland (Suomen virallinen lista)	39
Germany (GfK)	23
Global 200 (Billboard)	141
Hungary (Rádiós Top 40)	33
Ireland (IRMA)	42
Lithuania (AGATA)	43
Netherlands (Dutch Top 40)	19
Netherlands (Single Top 100)	69
New Zealand Hot Singles (RMNZ)	31
Poland (Polish Airplay Top 100)	72
Romania Airplay (TopHit)	191
South Korea (Circle)	86
Sweden Heatseeker (Sverigetopplistan)	16
Switzerland (Schweizer Hitparade)	32
Ukraine Airplay (TopHit)	86
UK Singles (Official Charts)	43
US Adult Contemporary (Billboard)	16
US Holiday Digital Song Sales (Billboard)	10

== Certifications ==
Certifications for "Christmas Without You"
Region	Certification	Certified units/sales
Germany (BVMI)	Gold	300,000^{‡}
United Kingdom (BPI)	Silver	200,000^{‡}
^{‡} Sales+streaming figures based on certification alone.

== Release history ==
Release dates and formats for "Christmas Without You"
Region	Date	Format(s)	Label	Ref.
Various	October 15, 2020	Digital download; streaming	Atlantic	
