= Choose Your Fighter =

Single by Ava Max

from the album Barbie the Album
- Released: July 28, 2023
- Genre: Eurodance
- Length: 2:17
- Label: Atlantic
- Composers: Henry Walter; Michael Pollack
- Lyricists: Amanda Koci; Madison Love
- Producer: Cirkut

Ava Max singles chronology
| "Car Keys (Ayla)" (2023) | "Choose Your Fighter" (2023) | "Whatever" (2024) |

Audio video
- "Choose Your Fighter" on YouTube

"Choose Your Fighter" is a song by American singer-songwriter Ava Max from Barbie the Album, the soundtrack of the 2023 film Barbie. It was written by Ava Max, Madison Love, Michael Pollack, and its producer Cirkut. The song was serviced to Italian radio on July 28, 2023, as the sixth single from the soundtrack.

== Background and release ==
In an interview with Cosmopolitan in mid-July 2023, Max mentioned that Mark Ronson, the producer of the Barbie soundtrack, played part of the film to her via a Zoom meeting. In the same interview, Max stated that the songwriting process took two hours and happened while she was on tour. The song was written by Max, Madison Love, Michael Pollack and Cirkut and produced by the latter.

On July 11, 2023, Max shared a snippet of the song through her social media. The song was serviced to Italian radio on July 28, 2023, as the sixth single from the soundtrack.

== Critical reception ==
"Choose Your Fighter" received positive reviews from critics, with many comparing it to Ava Max's 2020 single "Kings & Queens" by music critics. Cat Zhang from Pitchfork described the song as "'Kings & Queens' with different plastic accessories", while Victoria Wasylak from Paste described it as "a discarded first draft of 'Kings & Queens'". Writing for NME, Alex Rigotti stated that both songs have the "same a capella intro, same key and even the same chord progression".

== Charts ==
=== Weekly charts ===
Weekly chart performance for "Choose Your Fighter"
| Chart (2023–2024) | Peak position |
|---|---|
| Belarus Airplay (TopHit) | 116 |
| Belgium (Ultratop 50 Flanders) | 41 |
| Canadian Digital Song Sales (Billboard) | 47 |
| CIS Airplay (TopHit) | 133 |
| Croatia (HRT) | 74 |
| Germany Airplay (BVMI) | 64 |
| Germany Download (Official German Charts) | 63 |
| Ireland (IRMA) | 91 |
| Lithuania Airplay (TopHit) | 151 |
| Netherlands (Tipparade) | 16 |
| Poland (Polish Airplay Top 100) | 46 |
| Russia Airplay (TopHit) | 132 |
| Slovakia Airplay (ČNS IFPI) | 28 |
| UK Singles (OCC) | 90 |
| US Hot Dance/Electronic Songs (Billboard) | 7 |

=== Year-end charts ===
2023 year-end chart performance for "Choose Your Fighter"
| Chart (2023) | Position |
|---|---|
| US Hot Dance/Electronic Songs (Billboard) | 33 |

2024 year-end chart performance for "Choose Your Fighter"
| Chart (2024) | Position |
|---|---|
| US Hot Dance/Electronic Songs (Billboard) | 100 |

== Release history ==
Release dates and formats for "Choose Your Fighter"
| Region | Date | Format | Label | Ref. |
|---|---|---|---|---|
| Italy | July 28, 2023 | Radio airplay | Warner | |
