= Lost Your Faith =

Single by Ava Max

from the album Don't Click Play
- Released: February 7, 2025
- Length: 3:13
- Label: Atlantic
- Songwriters: Amanda Ava Koci; Delacey; Leroy Clampitt; Lucy Healey
- Producers: Leroy Clampitt; Pink Slip

Ava Max singles chronology
"Baby It's Both" (2024)	"Lost Your Faith" (2025)	"Lovin Myself" (2025)

Music video
- "Lost Your Faith" on YouTube

"Lost Your Faith" is a song by American singer Ava Max. It was released on February 7, 2025, through Atlantic Records as the lead single from her third studio album, Don't Click Play (2025).

== Background and release ==
On January 24, 2025, Max posted three photos with the caption "I thought forever meant we'd die together, I don't know". She changed her profile to one of the photos the following day. The next day, Max announced in an interview that the song would be released in February. On February 7, 2025, the song's visualizer was released along with the song.

== Critical reception ==
"Lost Your Faith" was called a "driving breakup song" with a "1980s rock-esque straight beat" akin to her 2020 single "Kings & Queens" that then turns into a "more electronic dance-pop instrumental for its chorus", with Max lamenting "the slow disintegration of the relationship, noting that it feels like her lover's devotion has waned".

== Music video ==
On February 20, 2025, Max shot a music video for the song. The music video, directed by Claire Arnld and featuring actor Finn Wittrock, was later released on March 19, 2025.

== Personnel ==
Credits were adapted from Spotify and Apple Music.

- Amanda Ava Koci – vocals, songwriting
- Delacey – songwriting
- Leroy Clampitt – songwriting
- Lucy Healey – songwriting
- PinkSlip – engineering, production
- Serban Ghenea – mixing, engineering

== Charts ==
=== Weekly charts ===
Weekly chart performance
Chart (2025)	Peak position
Belarus Airplay (TopHit)	108
CIS Airplay (TopHit)	66
Croatia International Airplay (Top lista)	33
Estonia Airplay (TopHit)	98
Japan Hot Overseas (Billboard Japan)	17
Lithuania Airplay (TopHit)	132
Romania Airplay (TopHit)	83
Russia Airplay (TopHit)	49
South Korea BGM (Circle)	51
Suriname (Nationale Top 40)	29

=== Monthly charts ===
Monthly chart performance
Chart (2025)	Position
CIS Airplay (TopHit)	75
Russia Airplay (TopHit)	65

== Release history ==
List of release dates and formats
Region	Date	Format(s)	Version	Label	Ref.
Various	February 7, 2025	Digital download; streaming	Original	Atlantic	
Various	April 18, 2025	Digital download; streaming	SONIKKU remix	Atlantic	
