= Vagalume =

- Website type: Music, news
- Available in: Portuguese
- Owners: Ana Letícia Torres and Daniel Lafraia
- Commercial: Yes
- Launched: 2002
- Current status: 2002 - present

Vagalume is a music portal from Brazil. Created in 2002 by the couple Ana Letícia Torres and Daniel Lafraia, they used the PHP language with MySQL database to initially create a small base of lyrics of songs. Gradually, users sent lyrics and included information from artists of all musical genres (more than 1,000 new lyrics are sent daily). Over time, other content was added including autographs, biographies, and discography. The stylized logo was created by remembering the insect firefly. The portal is one of the most accessed throughout Brazil and Portugal.

In 2004 the first plugin of the site was launched, which integrated with Winamp. It had a good acceptance and prominence in the Brazilian media, with that the plugin was also developed for other players, like Windows Media Player, iTunes and Foobar2000. In April 2006 the magazine Info Exame classified the plugins as a 206 of the best software on the planet. In August 2006 the site was also taken to Argentina in partnership with UOL, but was extinguished with the change of the site to the IG. Since mid-2012 the site is partner of R7 the news portal of Rede Record. In 2016, Vagalume launched Vagalume FM, a Brazilian music streaming platform to compete with Spotify and Deezer, and the application has already been downloaded more than 10000 times on Google Play, and the site's own application has already been downloaded more than 10 million times.
