= Make Up (Vice and Jason Derulo song) =

Single by Vice and Jason Derulo featuring Ava Max
- Released: October 23, 2018
- Genre: Pop; funk
- Length: 2:40
- Label: Atlantic
- Songwriters: Jason Derulo; Ashley Gorley; Jacob Kasher Hindlin; Ian Eric Kirkpatrick; Charlie Puth

Vice singles chronology
"Don't Go" (2018)	"Make Up" (2018)	"Drag My Heart" (2019)

Jason Derulo singles chronology
"Goodbye" (2018)	"Make Up" (2018)	"Let's Shut Up & Dance" (2019)

Ava Max singles chronology
"Sweet but Psycho" (2018)	"Make Up" (2018)	"So Am I" (2019)

"Make Up" is a song by American DJ Vice and American singer Jason Derulo, featuring vocals from American singer Ava Max. It was released as a single on October 23, 2018, by Atlantic Records.

== Critical reception ==
The song was well received by critics. Mike Wass from Idolator described the song as "a funk-heavy banger about the joys of making up", while BroadwayWorld stated that it "fuses Derulo's silky falsetto with Max's irresistible vocals for the ultimate 'kiss-and-make-up' anthem". Paper felt that the song encapsulated "the signature mix of sultry and upbeat pop funk we've come to love and expect from Derulo since his "Whatcha Say" days."

== Music video ==
The music video was released on October 23, 2018. It depicts Derulo showing off his choreography and shirtless poses, alongside Max lounging poolside. As of April 2022, the video had over 7 million views on YouTube.

== Track listing ==
Digital download – single
No.	Title	Length
1.	"Make Up" (featuring Ava Max)	2:40

Digital download – acoustic
No.	Title	Length
1.	"Make Up" (featuring Ava Max) (Acoustic)	2:59

Digital download – Black Caviar remix
No.	Title	Length
1.	"Make Up" (featuring Ava Max) (Black Caviar Remix)	3:34

Digital download – MOTi remix
No.	Title	Length
1.	"Make Up" (featuring Ava Max) (MOTi Remix)	2:50

== Charts ==
Chart performance for "Make Up"
Chart (2018)	Peak position
New Zealand Hot Singles (RMNZ)	32
Norway Airplay (IFPI Norge)	6

== Release history ==
Release history and formats for "Make Up"
Region	Date	Format	Label	Ref.
Various	October 23, 2018	Digital download; streaming	Atlantic	
