= DJ Vice =

American DJ

Vice
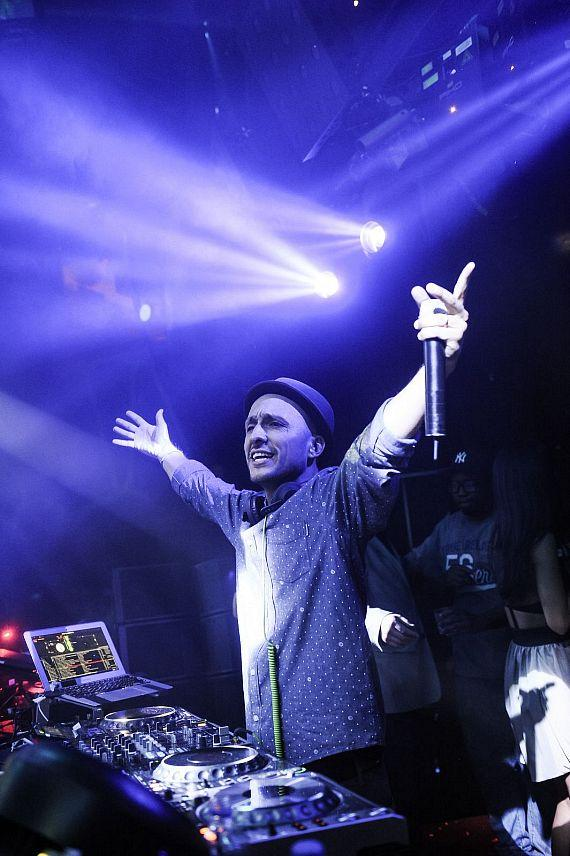
- DJ Vice performing at a show
- Born: Eric Aguirre; October 13, 1978 (age 47); Los Angeles, California
- Other name: Eric Aguirre
- Occupations: DJ; owner of CRSVR
- Website: http://djvice.com

Eric Aguirre also known as Vice (born October 13, 1978) is an American DJ. He is signed to Creative Artists Agency.

== Early life ==
Born in Los Angeles, California, Vice bought his first turntables at the age of 12.

== Career ==
His list of residences includes Marquee (Las Vegas and New York City), Liv Miami, and Create in Los Angeles, in addition to performances at Coachella, Nocturnal Wonderland, Electric Daisy Carnival and Ultra Miami. He has worked with Rihanna, Kelly Rowland, Capital Cities, Linkin Park, and Tegan & Sara.

In April 2016, Vice was featured on fellow DJ Diplo's BBC Radio 1 show Diplo & Friends. In October 2018, Vice joined "97.1 Amp Radio" KAMP-FM in Los Angeles as host of an afternoon mixshow.

== Personal life ==
Vice lives in Los Angeles, California and is married.

== Electric Taco ==
Electric Taco is a monthly series that launched January 2016 and features Vice in a Tesla with celebrities such as Reggie Bush, A-Trak and Nick Young from the Los Angeles Lakers.

== Singles ==
On September 30, 2016, Vice released an interpolation of Anna Graceman's original song "Treble Heart". The new interpolation was called "Steady 1234", featuring YouTube singer Jasmine Thompson and rapper Skizzy Mars. The single was certified gold in Finland and was named winner of the Next Wave November challenge on musical.ly.

Vice released "Obsession" with Jon Bellion on March 10, 2017.

On August 11, 2017 he released a version of "Obsession" with rapper KYLE titled Obsession (25/7).

On October 23, 2018, he released "Make Up" with Jason Derulo, featuring Ava Max.
