= Lovin Myself =

2025 single by Ava Max

Single by Ava Max

from the album Don't Click Play
- Released: May 29, 2025
- Genre: Electro-pop
- Length: 2:56
- Label: Atlantic
- Songwriters: Amanda Ava Koci; Kyle Buckley; Lita; Scott Harris
- Producer: Pink Slip

Ava Max singles chronology
"Lost Your Faith" (2025)	"Lovin Myself" (2025)	"Wet, Hot American Dream" (2025)

Alternative cover
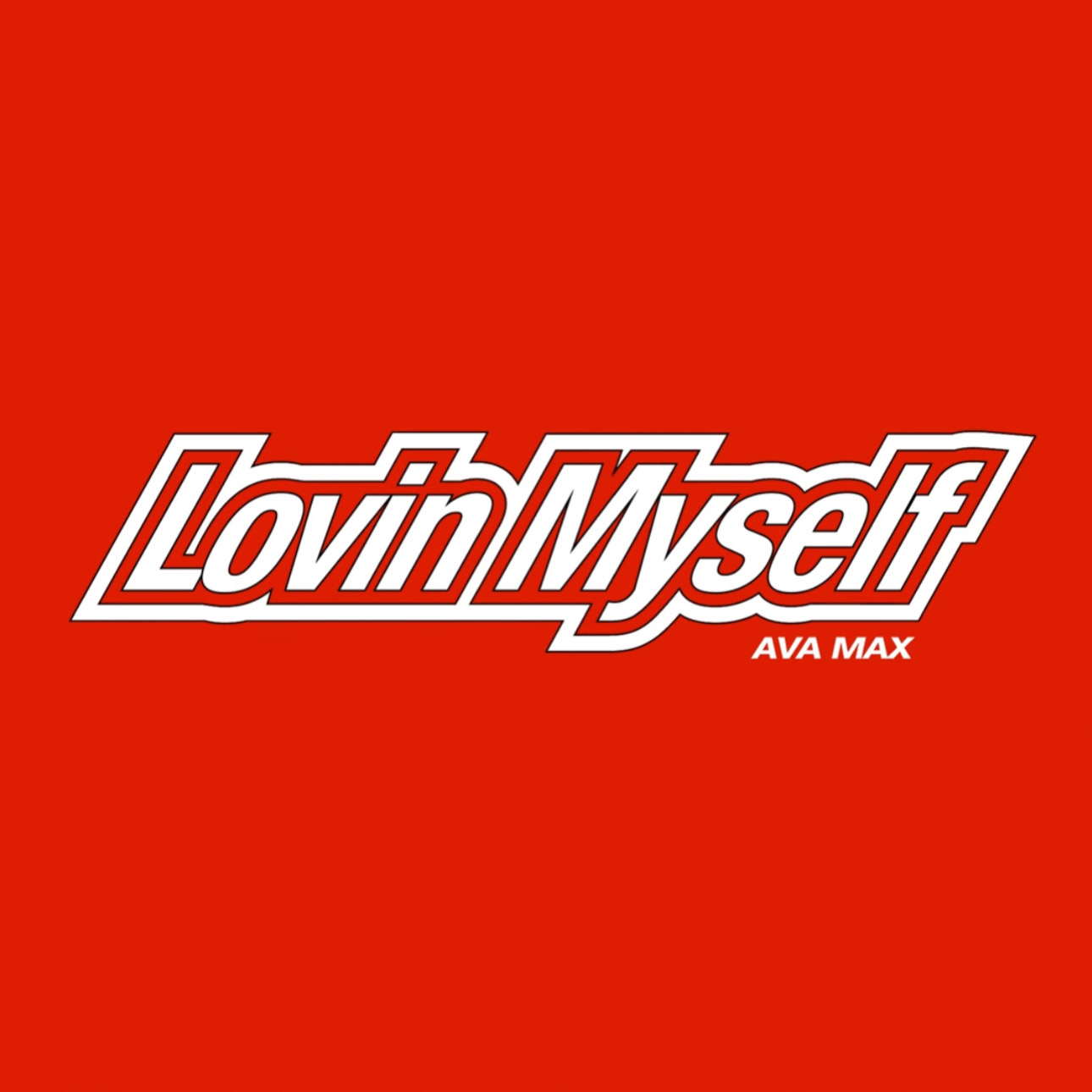

Music video
- "Lovin Myself" on YouTube

"Lovin Myself" is a song by American singer-songwriter Ava Max. It was released on May 29, 2025, through Atlantic Records as the second single from her third studio album, Don't Click Play (2025).

== Background and release ==
On April 1, 2025, a billboard showing Max with her signature hairstyle, the 'Max Cut', with a "don't click play on Ava Max" text appeared outside Coachella. Yet, the singer was not announced on the lineup of the festival. On April 9, Max shared a mysterious website called "don't click play on Ava Max" via her social media. Once on the website, the fans had to click on a "Sign the Petition" button which gave the option of listening to a snippet of Max's new song once being clicked. "Lovin Myself" marks the second single from the singer's then-upcoming third studio album, Don't Click Play, released on August 22.

This song came from a moment where I finally realized I didn't need anyone else's validation to feel whole. I've been through a lot of phases in my career, highs, lows, public scrutiny, private growth, and through all of that, I started to understand that the most important relationship I'll ever have is the one I have with myself. The lyrics really sum up where I'm at emotionally and creatively right now.

"Lovin Myself" is the most honest I've been in a song in a long time. It came out of a period where I was really learning how to stand on my own, not just as an artist, but as a person. I realized that loving yourself isn't some cliché, it's a survival skill. This song is about choosing yourself, not in a selfish way, but in a healing way. I wanted it to feel like an anthem for anyone who's learning to be their own anchor.

In a statement to Rolling Stone, Max described the track as her most personal in recent years, written during a period of growth and self-reflection. She noted that the song captures her realization that self-love is essential, not as a cliché but as a means of survival, and intended it to serve as an anthem for those learning to rely on themselves.

== Composition ==
"Lovin Myself" is an upbeat electro-pop track that explores themes of resilience and self-love. According to Jason Lipshutz of Billboard, it doubles down on Max's self-empowerment messaging, pairing affirming vocals with warm, cascading synths. Lyrically, the song focuses on overcoming heartbreak and embracing independence, with the chorus featuring lines such as "I don't need nobody, I'm lovin' myself / Tonight it's all about me, yeah, it's good for my health".

== Reception ==
"Lovin Myself" topped Billboard's weekly new music poll, published on May 30, 2025, in which music fans voted it their favorite new release of the week. It secured 57 percent of the total vote, outperforming new releases by artists including Tate McRae, Miley Cyrus, Lorde, Leon Thomas, and Yeule. The result marked a notable show of fan support upon release and positioned the single as one of Max's strongest audience-driven performances in 2025.

== Music video ==
The music video for "Lovin Myself", directed by Claire Arnold and choreographed by Tiffany Simone, was released alongside the single. It opens with Max in a pastel stairwell sipping a mocktail labeled "Maxxx Energy". As the verse hits, she wakes on a rooftop with an "Ava Max sucks" sleeping mask while sporting a "Heartbreak Survivor" tee. A fiery billboard promoting her then-upcoming album Don't Click Play ignites behind her. The video then moves through energetic dance scenes across Los Angeles. It ends back on the rooftop at sunset, with Max and a team of dancers in a celebratory dance, embracing self-confidence and freedom.

== Personnel ==
Credits were adapted from Tidal.

- Amanda Ava Koci – vocals, songwriter
- Lita Caputo – background vocals, songwriter
- Kyle Buckley – songwriter, producer, vocal producer
- Scott Harris – songwriter
- Bryce Bordone – engineer
- Chris Gehringer – masterer
- Serban Ghenea – mixer

== Charts ==
=== Weekly charts ===
Chart (2025–2026)	Peak position
Belarus Airplay (TopHit)	121
Central America Anglo Airplay (Monitor Latino)	17
CIS Airplay (TopHit)	41
Croatia International Airplay (Top lista)	32
Czech Republic Airplay (ČNS IFPI)	85
Ecuador Anglo Airplay (Monitor Latino)	14
Hungary (Rádiós Top 40)	4
Lebanon (Lebanese Top 20)	11
Lithuania Airplay (TopHit)	22
Nicaragua Anglo Airplay (Monitor Latino)	2
Panama Anglo Airplay (Monitor Latino)	8
Peru Anglo Airplay (Monitor Latino)	16
Poland (Polish Airplay Top 100)	37
Russia Airplay (TopHit)	35
Slovakia Airplay (ČNS IFPI)	10
South Korea BGM (Circle)	111
Switzerland Airplay (IFPI)	8
Uruguay Anglo Airplay (Monitor Latino)	12

=== Monthly charts ===
Chart (2025)	Peak position
CIS Airplay (TopHit)	46
Lithuania Airplay (TopHit)	54
Russia Airplay (TopHit)	44
