= On Somebody =

2019 promotional single by Ava Max

Promotional single by Ava Max
- Released: December 30, 2019
- Genre: Electropop
- Length: 3:04
- Label: Atlantic
- Songwriters: Amanda Ava Koci; Henry Walter; Jason Evigan; Lisa Scinta; Nate Cyphert
- Producers: Cirkut; Jason Evigan

Audio video
- "On Somebody" on YouTube

"On Somebody" is a song by American singer Ava Max, released on December 30, 2019, through Atlantic Records as a promotional single. The song was written by Max, Lisa Scinta, Nate Cyphert, and producers Cirkut and Jason Evigan. "On Somebody" is an electropop song which consists of a harpsichord. The lyrics depict the difficult nature of moving on from a relationship. The song received generally favorable reviews from music critics, who praised the production. It peaked at number 35 on the New Zealand Hot Singles chart.

== Background and composition ==
"On Somebody" was released on December 30, 2019, prior to Max's performance on Dick Clark's New Year's Rockin' Eve the next day. The song was written by Max, Lisa Scinta, Nate Cyphert, and producers Cirkut and Jason Evigan. It is an electropop song, with lyrics describing a person struggling to move on from a failed relationship. "On Somebody" begins with Max singing the opening line, "Heartbreak. Heartbreak is a motherfucker", which is accompanied by a harpsichord with fuzzed-out vocal treatment throughout the duration of the song.

== Reception ==
India McCarty from Soundigest described "On Somebody" as "interesting", based on how Max details a relationship. Idolator staff Mike Nied listed the song as one of his favorite tracks by Max, which he described the chorus as "relateable". Writing for Paper, Michael Love wrote that while the song's lyrics were a "tried-and-true narrative", he commended the production for containing surprises which kept the song interesting. "On Somebody" peaked at number 35 on the New Zealand Hot Singles chart dated January 13, 2020.

== Credits and personnel ==
Credits adapted from Apple Music metadata.

- Amanda Ava Koci – vocals, songwriting
- Henry Walter – production, songwriting
- Jason Evigan – production, songwriting
- Lisa Scinta – songwriting
- Nate Cyphert – songwriting

== Charts ==
Chart performance for "On Somebody"
Chart (2019)	Peak position
New Zealand Hot Singles (RMNZ)	35
