= One Night (Ava Max song) =

2023 song by Ava Max

Song by Ava Max
- Length: 2:58
- Label: Atlantic
- Songwriters: Amanda Ava Koci; Madison Emiko Love; Henry Walter; Stuart David Price
- Producers: Cirkut; Stuart Price

"One Night" is a unreleased song by American singer-songwriter Ava Max. It was set to initially appear on her second studio album, Diamonds & Dancefloors. However, due to the album's premature leak, the song was discarded by Max and Atlantic Records.

However, in late 2025, the song started being played on Hungarian radiostation Rádió 1. "One Night" later debuted at number 17 on the Hungarian radio chart on the issue dated September 25, 2025, and reached number 5 on the issue dated October 16, scoring Max's 13th top five hit on the chart. According to the Hungarian Recording Industry Association, "One Night" was the 57th most-consumed song on Hungarian radios in 2025, spending 14 weeks on the chart.

== Background and composition ==
"One Night" was written by Max and Madison Love, and it features production by Cirkut and Stuart Price. It was registered by the American Society of Composers, Authors and Publishers (ASCAP) in February 2023, suggesting that it was likely intended to appear on the deluxe edition of Max's sophomore album Diamonds & Dancefloors which was released a few weeks prior. On December 31, 2024, the song leaked in full, along with 4 other songs.

Max was unhappy with the leak. She addressed the situation via Instagram stories a few days after the leak, on January 2, 2025.

"Ok yes I have a lot of demos I've written that are not finalized records, and I'd appreciate it if you stop leaking those records ^ like this one.

A lot of records I write do not ever see the light of day and I understand your frustration, but this is not right. I write a lot of records I wish I could put out. This is one of 5 songs I have found today. It's not right. I will find out who did this. Like I usually do. So plz Stop.

I've never posted about this since the leak of my second album prematurely. Plz respect my art so I can keep working on making the songs I wanna put out that make sense for my project, and who I am perfect for you."

She had previously addressed leaks in an interview with Rolling Stone:

"It hurts because you put so much work towards the body of work and then it's out there. And I know not everyone heard it and it's hard to find, but a lot of people did. It's definitely hurtful, for sure."

== Reception ==
In late 2025, the Hungarian radio station Rádió 1 started playing the leak frequently, calling it Max's "latest hit".

"One Night" debuted at number 17 on the Hungarian radio chart on the issue dated September 25, 2025. It later reached number 5 on the issue dated October 16, 2025, scoring Max's 13th top five hit on the chart. According to the Hungarian Recording Industry Association, "One Night" was the 57th most-consumed song on Hungarian radios in 2025, spending 14 weeks on the chart.

== Charts ==
=== Weekly charts ===
Weekly chart performance for "One Night"
Chart (2025–2026)	Peak position
Hungary (Rádiós Top 40)	5

=== Year-end charts ===
2025 year-end chart performance for "One Night"
Chart (2025)	Position
Hungary (Rádiós Top 40)	57
