= Spot a Fake =

Single by Ava Max
- Released: September 20, 2024
- Recorded: 2024
- Genre: Dance-pop; synth-pop
- Length: 2:47
- Label: Atlantic
- Songwriters: Amanda Ava Koci; Lauren Mandel; Salem Ilese Davern; Grant Boutin
- Producers: Grant Boutin; Pink Slip

Ava Max singles chronology
"My Oh My" (2024)	"Spot a Fake" (2024)	"Forever Young" (2024)

Lyric video
- "Spot a Fake" on YouTube

"Spot a Fake" is a song by American singer-songwriter Ava Max. It was released on September 20, 2024, through Atlantic Records.

== Background and release ==
On July 2, 2024, Max posted a snippet of an early demo of "Spot a Fake" on her social media.

On September 13, she announced the single's release date along with a new snippet, followed by the reveal of the single's cover art, which pays homage to the 2012 film Moonrise Kingdom three days later. Max stated the song and video tell a "story of betrayal and broken girl code" that were "inspired by moments that shook her inner circle".

In a promotional teaser video, it depicts a friend raising a knife behind Max's back, which fans speculate represented her former collaborator Madison Love. It was released for digital download and streaming on September 20. It was written by Max, LØLØ, Salem Ilese, and its producer Grant Boutin.

== Credits and personnel ==
Credits adapted from Apple Music.

- Amanda Ava Koci – vocals, songwriting
- Grant Boutin – songwriting, production
- Lauren Mandel – songwriting
- Salem Ilese – songwriting
- Kyle Buckley - production
- Chris Gehringer – mastering
- Tom Norris – mixing engineer

== Charts ==
=== Weekly charts ===
Weekly chart performance for "Spot a Fake"
Chart (2024–2025)	Peak position
Belarus Airplay (TopHit)	8
CIS Airplay (TopHit)	4
Croatia International Airplay (Top lista)	13
Estonia Airplay (TopHit)	31
Finland Airplay (Suomen virallinen radiosoittolista)	6
Hungary (Rádiós Top 40)	3
Kazakhstan Airplay (TopHit)	1
Lithuania Airplay (TopHit)	33
Moldova Airplay (TopHit)	103
Netherlands (Tipparade)	25
North Macedonia Airplay (Radiomonitor)	7
Poland (Polish Airplay Top 100)	41
Russia Airplay (TopHit)	1
Serbia Airplay (Radiomonitor)	18
Slovakia Airplay (ČNS IFPI)	10
South Korea BGM (Circle)	29
Sweden Heatseeker (Sverigetopplistan)	2
Ukraine Airplay (TopHit)	6
UK Singles Downloads (Official Charts)	81
UK Singles Sales (OCC)	84
US Hot Dance/Electronic Songs (Billboard)	19

=== Monthly charts ===
Monthly chart performance for "Spot a Fake"
Chart (2024–2025)	Peak position
Belarus Airplay (TopHit)	14
CIS Airplay (TopHit)	5
Estonia Airplay (TopHit)	39
Kazakhstan Airplay (TopHit)	3
Lithuania Airplay (TopHit)	51
Russia Airplay (TopHit)	1
Slovakia (Rádio Top 100)	84
Ukraine Airplay (TopHit)	10

=== Year-end charts ===
2024 year-end chart performance for "Spot a Fake"
Chart (2024)	Position
Belarus Airplay (TopHit)	132
CIS Airplay (TopHit)	67
Russia Airplay (TopHit)	61

2025 year-end chart performance for "Spot a Fake"
Chart (2025)	Position
Belarus Airplay (TopHit)	88
CIS Airplay (TopHit)	100
Hungary (Rádiós Top 40)	64
Kazakhstan Airplay (TopHit)	128

== Release history ==
Release dates and formats for "Spot a Fake"
Region	Date	Format(s)	Label(s)	Ref.
Various	September 20, 2024	Digital download; streaming	Atlantic	
Italy	September 20, 2024	Radio airplay	Warner	
