= My Oh My (Ava Max song) =

Single by Ava Max
- Released: April 4, 2024
- Recorded: 2023
- Genre: Dance pop; electropop
- Length: 2:36
- Label: Atlantic
- Songwriters: Amanda Ava Koci; Charles Nelsen; Jonathan Bach; Samuel Martin
- Producer: Inverness

Ava Max singles chronology
"Whatever" (2024)	"My Oh My" (2024)	"Spot a Fake" (2024)

Music video
- "My Oh My" on YouTube

"My Oh My" is a song by American singer-songwriter Ava Max. It was released through Atlantic Records on April 4, 2024.

== Background and composition ==
On March 19, 2024, Max posted a snippet of "My Oh My" on her social media and indicated that it was the beginning of a new era. She then announced the cover artwork and release date of the song on March 26. On March 28, the song was featured in an Instagram Reel posted by MLB Network to promote their coverage on the 2024 Opening Day. "My Oh My" was released for digital download and streaming on April 4. It was written by Max, JBach, Sam Martin, and its producer Inverness. A dance-pop and electropop song, it uses a melody known as the Arabian riff in its chorus.

== Music video ==
The music video for "My Oh My" was released alongside the song. It was directed by Hunter Moreno and choreographed by Matt Steffanina. It features Max and a group of dancers performing choreography in a warehouse. Later in the video, she is surrounded by a group of paparazzi taking pictures of her, followed by a scene where she dances freely on a table at a bar.

== Credits and personnel ==
Credits adapted from Tidal.

- Amanda Ava Koci – vocals, songwriter
- Charles Nelsen – songwriter, producer
- Jonathan Bach – songwriter
- Samuel Martin – songwriter
- Gian Stone – vocal producer
- Bryce Bordone – engineer
- Chris Gehringer – masterer
- John Hanes – immersive mixer
- Serban Ghenea – mixer

== Charts ==
=== Weekly charts ===
2024–2025 weekly chart performance for "My Oh My"
Chart (2024–2025)	Peak position
Belarus Airplay (TopHit)	38
Belgium (Ultratop 50 Wallonia)	40
CIS Airplay (TopHit)	15
Croatia International Airplay (Top lista)	9
Czech Republic Airplay (ČNS IFPI)	5
Estonia Airplay (TopHit)	94
Finland Airplay (Suomen virallinen radiosoittolista)	5
Kazakhstan Airplay (TopHit)	33
Latvia Airplay (TopHit)	8
Lithuania Airplay (TopHit)	165
Moldova Airplay (TopHit)	172
Norway (VG-lista)	38
Poland (Polish Airplay Top 100)	28
Russia Airplay (TopHit)	12
Slovakia Airplay (ČNS IFPI)	6
South Korea BGM (Circle)	59
Sweden (Sverigetopplistan)	73
UK Singles Downloads (Official Charts)	26
UK Singles Sales (OCC)	28
US Hot Dance/Electronic Songs (Billboard)	13

2026 weekly chart performance for "My Oh My"
Chart (2026)	Peak position
Honduras Anglo Airplay (Monitor Latino)	8

=== Monthly charts ===
Monthly chart performance for "My Oh My"
Chart (2024)	Peak position
Belarus Airplay (TopHit)	44
CIS Airplay (TopHit)	21
Czech Republic (Rádio Top 100)	30
Latvia Airplay (TopHit)	23
Russia Airplay (TopHit)	17
Slovakia (Rádio – Top 100)	12

=== Year-end charts ===
2024 year-end chart performance for "My Oh My"
Chart (2024)	Position
Belarus Airplay (TopHit)	90
CIS Airplay (TopHit)	80
Russia Airplay (TopHit)	75
US Hot Dance/Electronic Songs (Billboard)	67

2025 year-end chart performance for "My Oh My"
Chart (2025)	Position
Russia Airplay (TopHit)	151

== Release history ==
Release dates and formats for "My Oh My"
Region	Date	Format(s)	Label(s)	Ref.
Various	April 4, 2024	Digital download; streaming	Atlantic	
Italy	April 5, 2024	Radio airplay	Warner	
