= Blood, Sweat & Tears (Ava Max song) =

2019 promotional single by Ava Max

Promotional single by Ava Max
- Released: July 30, 2019
- Genre: Pop
- Length: 3:13
- Label: Atlantic
- Songwriters: Amanda Ava Koci; Henry Walter; Peter Thomas; Sofia Hoops
- Producer: Cirkut

Lyric video
- "Blood, Sweat & Tears" on YouTube

"Blood, Sweat & Tears" is a song by American singer Ava Max, released as a promotional single through Atlantic Records on July 30, 2019, and charted on the Czech Radio Top 100 at number 60. The song was written by Max, Peter Thomas, Sofia Hoops, and the producer Cirkut, with lyrics describing the determination to persevere through a relationship.

== Release and reception ==
"Blood, Sweat & Tears" was released on July 30, 2019, which was accompanied by a lyric video. The song was written by Max, Peter Thomas, Sofia Hoops, and the producer Cirkut. In a statement, Max described the lyrics as "giving all of yourself to someone you love and sticking by their side no matter what". Writing for Time, Raisa Bruner stated that it was "prime singalong material with an instant catchy factor". "Blood, Sweat & Tears" charted on the Czech Radio Top 100 at number 60.

== Composition ==
"Blood, Sweat & Tears" is described by Brittany Spanos of Rolling Stone as a midtempo song with an anthemic chorus. The song's lyrics detail a relationship where each party is giving their all. In the pop hook, Max's vocals grow more urgent as she sings the lyrics, "I'mma give you all my blood, sweat, tears / And when it hurts I'm gonna stay right here". Writing for MTV News, Madeline Roth wrote that the chorus' lyrics detail a "messy relationship", which she compared to William Shakespeare's 1597 tragedy Romeo and Juliet.

== Track listing ==
Digital download – Promotional single
No.	Title	Length
1.	"Blood, Sweat & Tears"	3:13

== Credits and personnel ==
Credits adapted from Apple Music metadata.

- Amanda Ava Koci – vocals, songwriting
- Henry Walter – production, songwriting
- Peter Thomas – songwriting
- Sofia Hoops – songwriting

== Charts ==
Chart performance for "Blood, Sweat & Tears"
Chart (2019)	Peak position
Czech Republic Airplay (ČNS IFPI)	60
