= Whatever (Kygo and Ava Max song) =

2024 single by Kygo and Ava Max

Single by Kygo and Ava Max

from the album Kygo
- Released: 19 January 2024
- Genre: Tropical house
- Length: 2:58
- Label: RCA
- Composers: Kyrre Gørvell-Dahll; Patrick Martin; Gloria Estefan; Jonah Sky; Shakira; Tim Mitchell
- Lyricists: Amanda Ava Koci; Cleo Tighe; Roland Spreckley
- Producers: Kygo; Petey Martin

Kygo singles chronology
"Say Say Say" (2023)	"Whatever" (2024)	"For Life" (2024)

Ava Max singles chronology
"Choose Your Fighter" (2023)	"Whatever" (2024)	"My Oh My" (2024)

Music video
- "Whatever" on YouTube

"Whatever" is a song by Norwegian DJ Kygo and American singer Ava Max. It was released on 19 January 2024 through RCA Records, as the lead single from Kygo's eponymous fifth studio album. The tropical house song was written by both artists alongside Cleo Tighe, Jonah Shy, Petey Martin and Rollo. It contains an interpolation of Shakira's 2001 song "Whenever, Wherever", with lyrics about a breakup; therefore, Shakira, Tim Mitchell and Gloria Estefan are credited as co-writers. The song reached number one in Norway and the top 10 in Sweden.

The song reached number 8 on the Australian Dance Singles Chart, becoming Kygo's first song to chart in Australia since "What's Love Got to Do with It" (2020).

== Background and composition ==
In early January 2024, Kygo and Max posted snippets of an upcoming collaboration on their social media accounts. On 10 January, Kygo announced the release date of the song. "Whatever" was released for digital download and streaming on January 19 through RCA Records and Sony Music. It was written by Kygo, Max, Cleo Tighe, Jonah Shy, Patrick Martin, and Rollo. The chorus interpolates Shakira's 2001 song "Whenever, Wherever". Shakira, Gloria Estefan, and Tim Mitchell were consequently credited as songwriters.

"Whatever" is a tropical house song. The lyrics of the original song's chorus were modified to "Whatever, whatever / We were never good together / I'll be here and you stay there / Truth is, I never cared", making for a "harsh rebuke of the limitless love" presented in the original song. The instrumental is built around an acoustic guitar and a "pumping" kick drum.

== Critical reception ==
The song received mixed reviews from critics. Jason Heffler from EDM.com called the song an "infectious cover" and "a saccharine anthem that will soon dominate dance radio". We Rave You's Chris Vuoncino said to "expect 'Whatever' to be on repeat all year long at festivals and radio stations everywhere". Writing for Billboard, Andrew Unterberger described the song as "an undeniable club smash".

Less positively, Exclaim!'s Sydney Brasil wrote that the song's "horrid interpolation" is its "main crime", and that it "turns the [interpolated] track's chorus into a lazy breakup anthem". Marius Ásp from Verdens Gang also criticized the interpolation, describing it as "lazy and uninspired"; he gave the song a 2 out of 5.

== Music video ==
The music video for "Whatever" was released on January 19, 2024. Directed by Dano Cerny, it is set in a desolate desert highway. The opening scene shows a telephone booth in the middle of the desert, which then frequently cuts between Max and the landscape, leading to a scene where Max, who is wearing a black leather outfit and holding a rosary in one of the hands, starts singing as she walks away from a car. After the first chorus, reflective blue gems start floating around the singer, who is now wearing a black dress with a necklace containing three crosses. The video ends with the blue gems merging and showing a reflection of Max.

== Live performances ==
Kygo and Max first performed "Whatever" together on 13 February 2024 on Jimmy Kimmel Live!.

== Track listing ==
- Digital download / streaming
1. "Whatever" – 2:58
- Digital download / streaming – Tiësto remix
1. "Whatever" (Tiësto remix) – 2:45
- Digital download / streaming – The Remixes
1. "Whatever" (acoustic) – 3:45
2. "Whatever" (Lavern remix) – 2:46
3. "Whatever" (Klangkarussell remix) – 8:19
4. "Whatever" (Frank Walker remix) – 3:04
5. "Whatever" (Tiësto remix) – 2:45

== Personnel ==
- Kyrre Gørvell-Dahll – production, songwriting
- Amanda Ava Koci – vocals, songwriting
- Petey Martin – production
- Cleo Tighe – songwriting
- Gloria Estefan – songwriting
- Jonah Shy – songwriting
- Patrick Martin – songwriting
- Roland Spreckley – songwriting
- Shakira – songwriting
- Tim Mitchell – songwriting
- Bryce Bordone – assistant engineer
- Serban Ghenea – mixing engineer
- Randy Merrill – mastering engineer

== Charts ==
=== Weekly charts ===
Weekly chart performance for "Whatever"
Chart (2024)	Peak position
Australia Dance (ARIA)	8
Austria (Ö3 Austria Top 40)	20
Belarus Airplay (TopHit)	1
Belgium (Ultratop 50 Flanders)	20
Belgium (Ultratop 50 Wallonia)	7
Bulgaria Airplay (PROPHON)	8
Canada Hot 100 (Billboard)	54
CIS Airplay (TopHit)	3
Croatia International Airplay (Top lista)	3
Czech Republic Airplay (ČNS IFPI)	2
Czech Republic Singles Digital (ČNS IFPI)	43
Denmark (Tracklisten)	27
Estonia Airplay (TopHit)	6
Finland (Suomen virallinen lista)	31
France (SNEP)	27
Germany (GfK)	15
Global 200 (Billboard)	73
Greece International (IFPI)	86
Hungary (Dance Top 40)	20
Hungary (Rádiós Top 40)	2
Ireland (IRMA)	14
Japan Hot Overseas (Billboard Japan)	6
Kazakhstan Airplay (TopHit)	1
Latvia Airplay (LaIPA)	3
Lithuania (AGATA)	87
Lithuania Airplay (TopHit)	13
Luxembourg (Billboard)	16
Malta Airplay (Radiomonitor)	1
Moldova Airplay (TopHit)	1
Netherlands (Dutch Top 40)	13
Netherlands (Single Top 100)	19
New Zealand Hot Singles (RMNZ)	6
Nigeria (TurnTable Top 100)	95
North Macedonia Airplay (Radiomonitor)	2
Norway (VG-lista)	1
Poland (Polish Airplay Top 100)	20
Poland (Polish Streaming Top 100)	78
Romania Airplay (Media Forest)	8
Romania TV Airplay (Media Forest)	5
Russia Airplay (TopHit)	6
Serbia Airplay (Radiomonitor)	2
Slovakia Airplay (ČNS IFPI)	5
Slovakia Singles Digital (ČNS IFPI)	26
Slovenia Airplay (Radiomonitor)	1
South Korea BGM (Circle)	137
Spain Airplay (PROMUSICAE)	2
Sweden (Sverigetopplistan)	9
Switzerland (Schweizer Hitparade)	15
Turkey International Airplay (Radiomonitor Türkiye)	7
Ukraine Airplay (TopHit)	5
UK Singles (Official Charts)	15
UK Dance (Official Charts)	4
US Bubbling Under Hot 100 (Billboard)	1
US Hot Dance/Electronic Songs (Billboard)	6

=== Monthly charts ===
Monthly chart performance for "Whatever"
Chart (2024)	Peak position
Belarus Airplay (TopHit)	1
CIS Airplay (TopHit)	5
Czech Republic (Rádio Top 100)	3
Czech Republic (Singles Digitál Top 100)	44
Estonia Airplay (TopHit)	6
Kazakhstan Airplay (TopHit)	2
Latvia Airplay (TopHit)	24
Lithuania Airplay (TopHit)	16
Moldova Airplay (TopHit)	5
Romania Airplay (TopHit)	33
Russia Airplay (TopHit)	7
Slovakia (Rádio Top 100)	6
Slovakia (Singles Digitál Top 100)	30
Ukraine Airplay (TopHit)	7

=== Year-end charts ===
2024 year-end chart performance for "Whatever"
Chart (2024)	Position
Australia Dance (ARIA)	33
Austria (Ö3 Austria Top 40)	43
Belarus Airplay (TopHit)	2
Belgium (Ultratop 50 Flanders)	48
Belgium (Ultratop 50 Wallonia)	41
CIS Airplay (TopHit)	8
Denmark (Tracklisten)	59
Estonia Airplay (TopHit)	23
France (SNEP)	89
Germany (GfK)	37
Global 200 (Billboard)	182
Hungary (Dance Top 40)	61
Hungary (Rádiós Top 40)	17
Kazakhstan Airplay (TopHit)	11
Netherlands (Dutch Top 40)	55
Netherlands (Single Top 100)	54
Russia Airplay (TopHit)	8
Sweden (Sverigetopplistan)	23
Switzerland (Schweizer Hitparade)	41
UK Singles (OCC)	78
US Hot Dance/Electronic Songs (Billboard)	14

2025 year-end chart performance for "Whatever"
Chart (2025)	Position
Belarus Airplay (TopHit)	92
Hungary (Dance Top 40)	84
Hungary (Rádiós Top 40)	93

== Certifications ==
Certifications for "Whatever"
Region	Certification	Certified units/sales
Austria (IFPI Austria)	Platinum	30,000^{‡}
Belgium (BRMA)	Platinum	40,000^{‡}
Canada (Music Canada)	Platinum	80,000^{‡}
Denmark (IFPI Danmark)	Platinum	90,000^{‡}
France (SNEP)	Diamond	333,333^{‡}
Germany (BVMI)	Gold	300,000^{‡}
Hungary (MAHASZ)	2× Platinum	8,000^{‡}
Italy (FIMI)	Gold	50,000^{‡}
Mexico (AMPROFON)	Gold	70,000^{‡}
New Zealand (RMNZ)	Platinum	30,000^{‡}
Poland (ZPAV)	2× Platinum	100,000^{‡}
Spain (Promusicae)	Platinum	60,000^{‡}
Switzerland (IFPI Switzerland)	Platinum	30,000^{‡}
United Kingdom (BPI)	Platinum	600,000^{‡}
United States (RIAA)	Platinum	1,000,000^{‡}
Streaming
Sweden (GLF)	Platinum	12,000,000^{†}
^{‡} Sales+streaming figures based on certification alone.^{†} Streaming-only figures based on certification alone.

== Release history ==
Release dates and formats for "Whatever"
Region	Date	Format(s)	Version	Label(s)	Ref.
Various	19 January 2024	Digital download; streaming	Original	RCA	
Italy	26 January 2024	Radio airplay	Original	Sony	
Various	22 March 2024	Digital download; streaming	Tiësto remix	RCA	
Various	29 March 2024	Digital download; streaming	The Remixes	RCA	
