= Ava Max =

American singer and songwriter (born 1994)

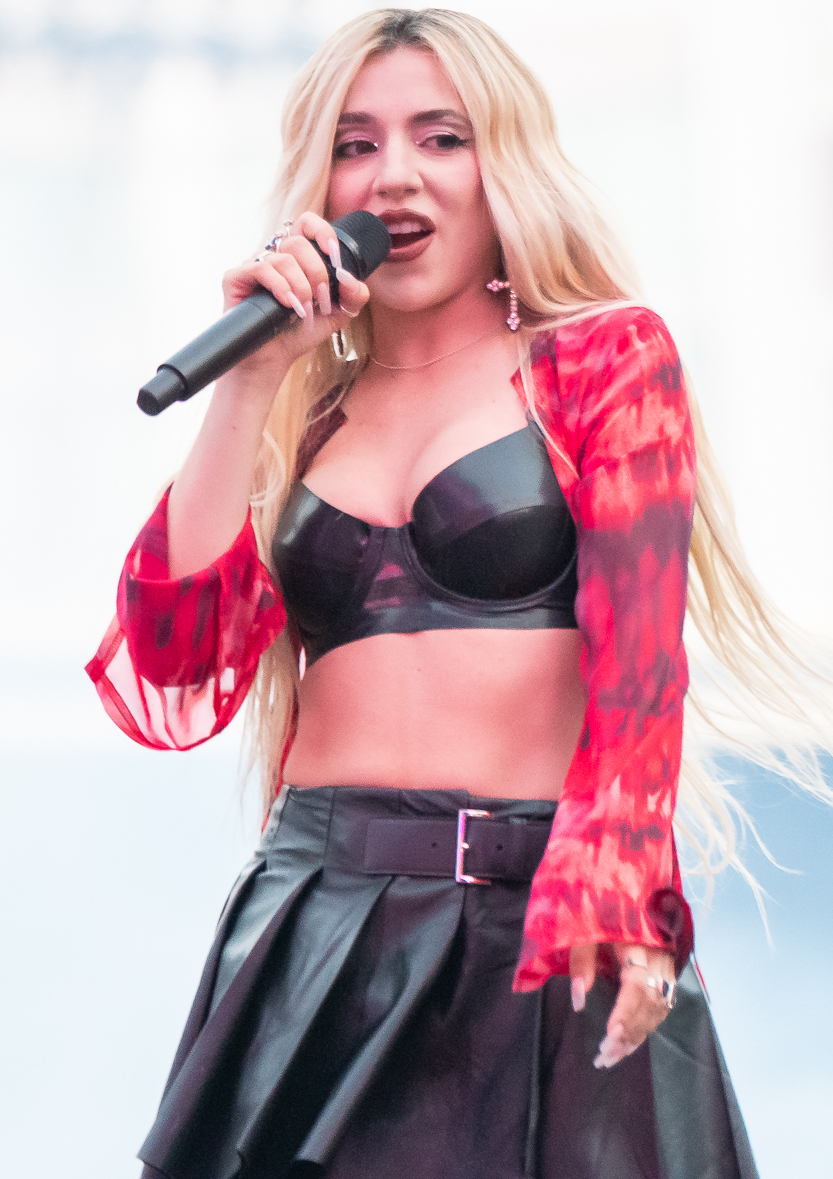
- Max in 2023

Background information
- Born: Amanda Koçi; February 16, 1994 (age 32); Milwaukee, Wisconsin, US
- Origin: Chesapeake, Virginia, US
- Genres: Pop; dance-pop; electropop
- Occupations: Singer; songwriter
- Instrument: Vocals
- Works: Discography
- Years active: 2008–2009; 2012–present
- Labels: Atlantic
- Awards: Full list
- Website: avamax.com

Amanda Ava Koci (born Amanda Koçi; February 16, 1994), known professionally as Ava Max, is an American singer and songwriter. She rose to prominence in 2018 with the release of her breakthrough single "Sweet but Psycho". The song peaked at number one in 22 countries and reached number two and number ten on the Australian ARIA Charts and US Billboard Hot 100, respectively.

In March 2020, Max released the song "Kings & Queens", which peaked at number 13 on the Billboard Hot 100 and at number 19 on the UK Singles Chart. It was followed by the release of her debut studio album, Heaven & Hell, in September 2020, which peaked at number two on the UK Albums Chart and at number 27 on the US Billboard 200. In November 2020, the song "My Head & My Heart" was released, which peaked at number 45 on the Billboard Hot 100 and at number 18 on the UK Singles Chart. On January 27, 2023, Max released her second studio album, Diamonds & Dancefloors, which contained the gold and platinum certified singles "Maybe You're the Problem" and "Million Dollar Baby" and received positive reviews.

On February 7, 2025, Max released "Lost Your Faith", the lead single from her third studio album, Don't Click Play. The album's second and third singles, "Lovin Myself" and "Wet, Hot American Dream", followed on May 29 and July 1, respectively. Don't Click Play was released on August 22, receiving mixed reviews and underperforming commercially compared to Max's previous efforts. In December, she announced via social media that she left Atlantic Records after nine years.

== Early life and education ==
Ava Max was born as Amanda Koçi in Milwaukee, Wisconsin, on February 16, 1994. Max's parents are from Albania. Her father, Paul (anglicized from Pavllo), is from Qeparo, and her mother, Andrea, is from Sarandë. In 1991, her parents fled Albania after the fall of communism in the country and lived at a Red Cross–supported church in Paris for a year. In Paris, they met a woman from Wisconsin who helped them immigrate to the United States, where Max was born. During her childhood, Max often saw her parents struggle financially, as they each worked three jobs without speaking English. Her mother was a classically trained opera singer, while her father was a pianist.

Max moved with her family to Virginia when she was two years old. She was raised in Hampton Roads. While living in Virginia, she competed in numerous Radio Disney singing competitions at Greenbrier Mall in Chesapeake and debuted at the NorVa in Norfolk when she was 10 years old as an opening act, performing Whitney Houston's 1987 song "I Wanna Dance with Somebody (Who Loves Me)". Max often traveled to Florida to perform in singing competitions and began releasing music under the moniker Amanda Kay, including a 2008 extended play. At the age of 13, Max came up with the middle name Ava and adopted it as her first name after stating that she did not like being called Amanda.

Max adopted the stage name Ava at the age of 14 and moved to Los Angeles, California, to pursue a music career at the suggestion of her mother, but she was constantly rejected for being underage. Max relocated to South Carolina a year later, where she began writing songs about relationships she had observed, including those of her brother. She later stated that she was grateful for the move, as it allowed her to experience a normal childhood. During her time in South Carolina, Max attended Lexington High School for a year, after being homeschooled, and she recalled being constantly bullied there. After she turned 17, Max returned to Los Angeles with her brother, who acted as her manager. She acknowledged that the partnership did not work out because "it was very difficult to take orders from my brother" and because neither knew anyone in the area. Max's difficult search for producers and songwriters caused her to spiral "down a really bad path", leading her to drink at an early age and survive on 20 dollars a week.

== Career ==
=== 2013–2017: Career beginnings and formations ===
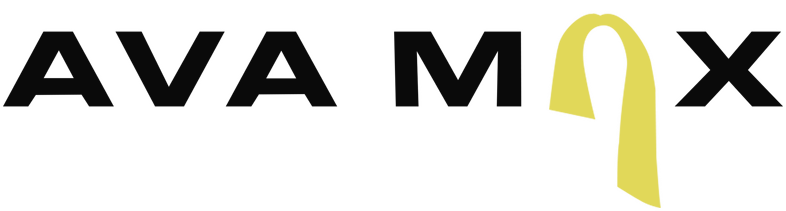
Max's logo, which displays the 'Max Cut'

Max released "Take Away the Pain" in 2013, which was remixed by the Canadian duo Project 46 in July 2015. For several years, her demos were rejected and not returned by record producers and songwriters. She faced several incidents of sexual harassment. In 2014, Max met Canadian record producer Cirkut, an acquaintance of her brother, at a dinner party in the Chateau Marmont. Max sang "Happy Birthday", which led the two musicians to work together, writing hundreds of songs and releasing "Anyone but You" on SoundCloud in July 2016. The song led various record labels to contact Max, and she signed with Atlantic Records in 2016. Max acknowledged that working with Cirkut changed her life, as she considered leaving the music industry after being creatively stifled.

After signing the deal at the age of 22, she began searching for a last name to use as her stage name, eventually deciding on Max because it combined masculine and feminine elements. From 2016 to 2017, Max adopted her signature hairstyle titled the 'Max Cut', seen in her logo as a substitute for the 'A' in Max. On August 4, 2017, Max was featured on the Le Youth song "Clap Your Hands", where she sang two different melodies.

=== 2018–2021: International breakthrough and Heaven & Hell ===
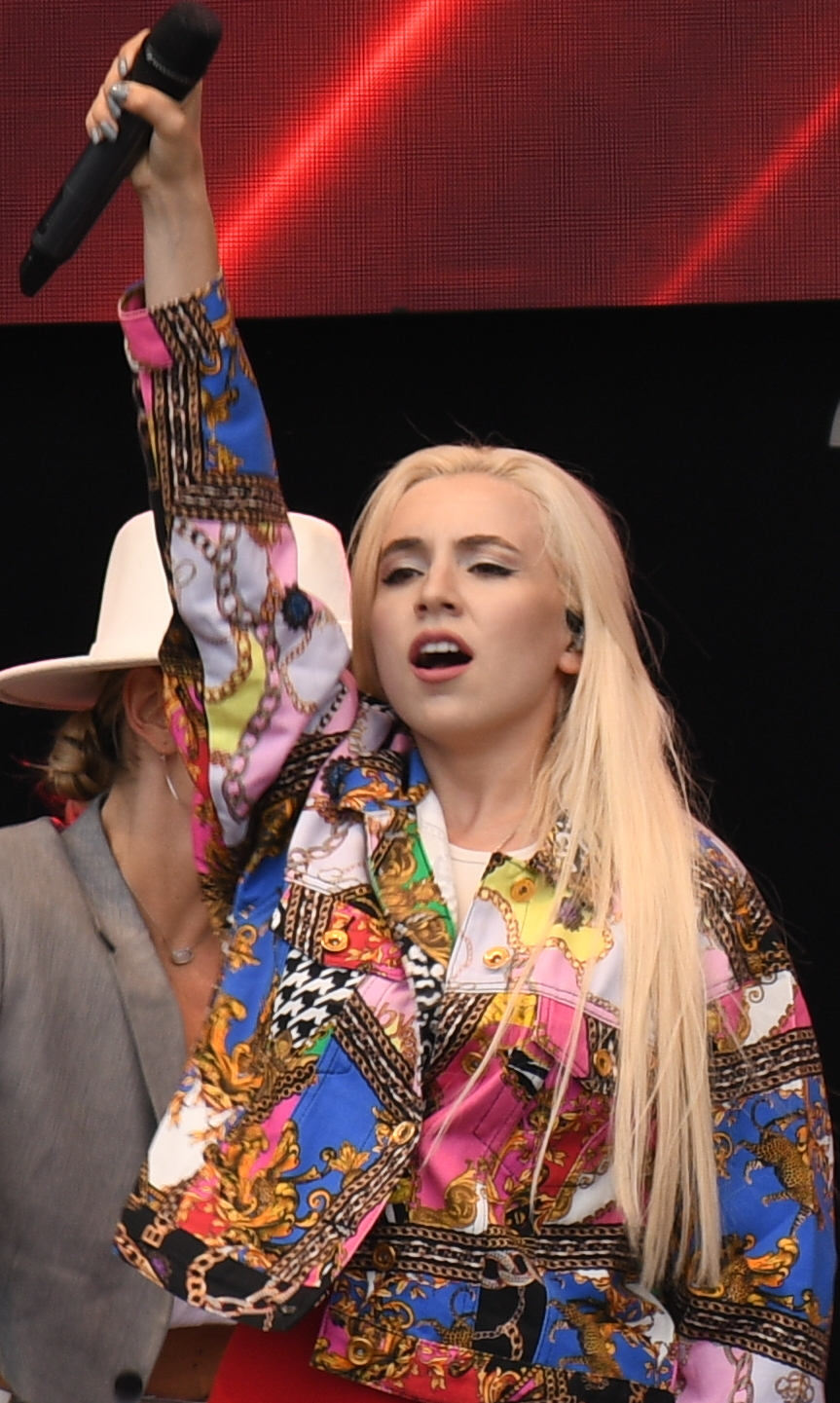
Max performing at the Gothenburg Rix FM Festival in August 2019

Max released the song "My Way" on April 20, 2018, which peaked at number 38 on the Romanian Airplay 100 chart. On May 11, 2018, "Slippin", a collaboration with American musician Gashi, was released. On June 8, 2018, Max was featured on the song "Into Your Arms" by American rapper Witt Lowry. A month later, "Salt" was sent to SoundCloud. On August 13, 2018, she released "Not Your Barbie Girl" as a promotional single.

"Sweet but Psycho" was released on August 17, 2018. The song became Max's commercial breakthrough, reaching number one in more than 22 countries including Germany, Switzerland, Austria, Norway, Sweden, New Zealand, and the United Kingdom, where it stayed at number one for four consecutive weeks. In January 2019, the song reached the top of the Billboard Dance Club Songs chart and later peaked at number 10 on the Billboard Hot 100. Since its release, "Sweet But Psycho" has gone platinum four times in the US and been streamed more than 2 billion times globally. Max was featured on the Vice and Jason Derulo song "Make Up" on October 23, 2018, and appeared on David Guetta's 2018 studio album 7 on the track "Let It Be Me".

On March 7, 2019, she released the follow-up single "So Am I", which reached the top 10 in Poland, Norway, Finland, and the Netherlands. A remix of the song was released on July 3, 2019, featuring South Korean boy band NCT 127. The songs "Blood, Sweat & Tears" and "Freaking Me Out" were released as promotional singles in July 2019. Max was featured on the song "Slow Dance" by American singer-songwriter AJ Mitchell August 7, 2019, and released "Torn" as a single on August 19, 2019. On September 4, 2019, she entered a joint co-publishing deal with Warner Chappell Music and Artist Publishing Group. On October 31, 2019, she released a music video for "Freaking Me Out" as a Halloween special. Max won Best Push Act at the 2019 MTV Europe Music Awards. On November 6, 2019, Max and Pablo Alborán released a duet called "Tabú". Max performed at the Jingle Bell Ball on December 7, 2019. The previously released song "Salt" was sent to digital streaming platforms on December 12, 2019. She collaborated with Norwegian DJ and record producer Alan Walker on the song "Alone, Pt. II", released on December 27, 2019. "On Somebody" was released as a promotional single on December 30, 2019.

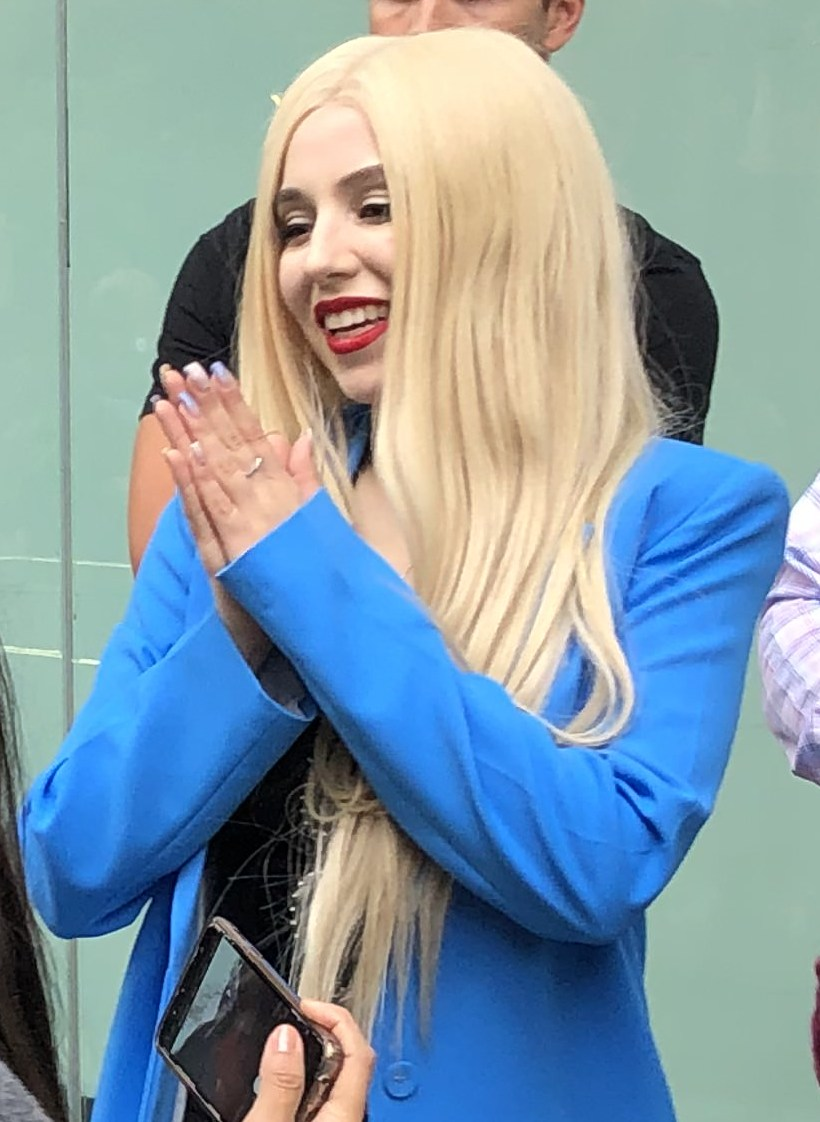
Max meeting fans in 2019

On March 12, 2020, Max released "Kings & Queens" as the fifth single from her then-unreleased debut studio album Heaven & Hell (2020). The song topped the Billboard Adult Top 40 chart on December 12, 2020, and has been certified platinum twice. She also appeared as a featured artist on the country song "On Me" with Thomas Rhett and Kane Brown, which was included on the soundtrack of the 2020 film Scoob! on May 15, 2020, accompanied with a music video. Max released "Who's Laughing Now" on July 30, 2020, and "OMG What's Happening" on September 3, 2020, as singles from the album. Heaven & Hell was released on September 18, 2020, alongside a music video for the song "Naked". The album peaked at number two on the UK Albums Chart and at number 27 on the Billboard 200.

On November 13, 2020, Max was featured on "Stop Crying Your Heart Out" as part of the BBC Radio 2 Allstars Children in Need charity single, which peaked at number seven on the UK Singles Chart. "My Head & My Heart" was released on November 19, 2020, which served as a bonus track from the digital re-issue of Heaven & Hell and was certified platinum on June 1, 2022. On June 8, 2021, Max released "EveryTime I Cry", which she stated was a "continuation" of her aforementioned studio album. She appeared on the R3hab and Jonas Blue song "Sad Boy" as a featured artist with Kylie Cantrall on September 10, 2021, in addition to Tiësto's song "The Motto" on November 4, 2021. The latter reached the top 10 in several countries, including Austria, Belgium, Canada, Germany, Netherlands, and Switzerland.

=== 2022–2023: Diamonds & Dancefloors ===
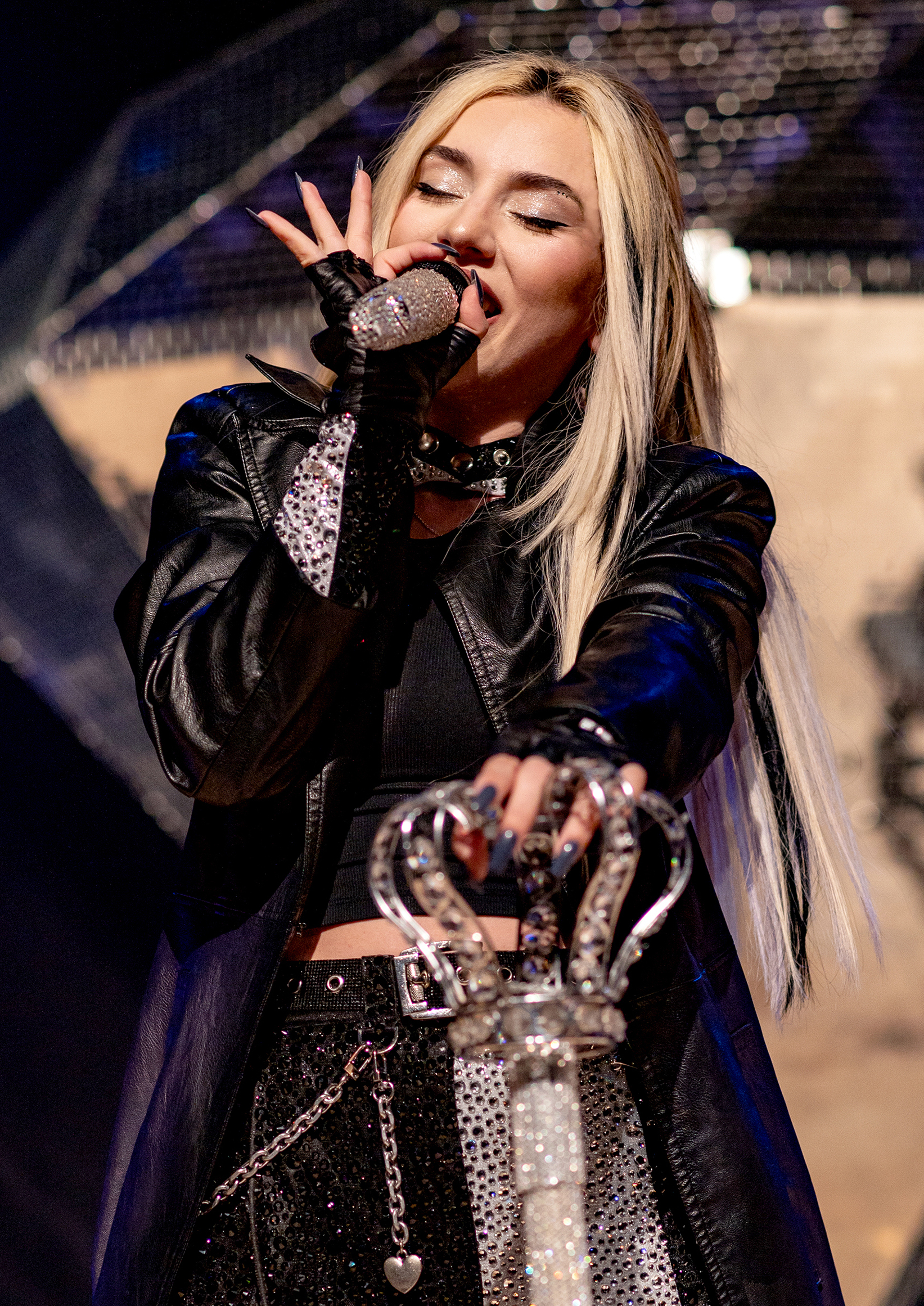
Max performing at the Fonda Theatre in Los Angeles in June 2023

In February 2022, Max hinted at a new project by replacing her 'Max Cut' hairstyle with cherry-red shoulder-length hair and emphasizing a red and pink appearance on her social media accounts. While interviewed at the Billboard Women in Music event in March 2022, she acknowledged that her second studio album was written the previous year during a personally difficult time. The album's lead single "Maybe You're the Problem" was released on April 28, 2022.

Max announced her second studio album Diamonds & Dancefloors on June 1, 2022, which was originally scheduled for release on October 14, 2022. She released "Million Dollar Baby" on September 1, 2022. The album's third single, "Weapons", was released on November 10, 2022. On November 16, 2022, the Ubisoft dance game Just Dance 2023 Edition revealed that "Million Dollar Baby" would be featured in the game, with Max serving as the coach for the dance. She released the fourth single, "Dancing's Done", on December 20, 2022.

On January 12, 2023, Max released the fifth single, "One of Us", a couple weeks before the release of Diamonds & Dancefloors on January 27, 2023. The album debuted in the top 10 in various countries, including Austria, Germany, Hungary, Spain, and Switzerland, and at number 34 on the Billboard 200 in the US. She performed at the WorldPride festival in Sydney, Australia, on March 5, 2023. Max embarked on her first headlining concert tour, titled On Tour (Finally), between April and September 2023, with shows across Europe and North America. During her Los Angeles concert on June 20, 2023, a man jumped on stage and slapped Max while she was performing "The Motto". She later revealed that the inside of her eye was scratched. The incident occurred two days after American singer Bebe Rexha was hit by a smartphone thrown by a concert-goer during her New York concert.

She collaborated with Brazilian DJ Alok on "Car Keys (Ayla)", released on June 30, 2023. Her song "Choose Your Fighter" appeared on the soundtrack of the 2023 film Barbie, which was released on July 21, 2023. The song was serviced to Italian radio as the fifth single of the soundtrack on July 28, 2023.

=== 2024–2025: Don't Click Play ===
On January 19, 2024, Max and Norwegian DJ Kygo released their collaboration "Whatever", which peaked at number 1 in Norway and reached the top 10 in Belgium, Bulgaria, Croatia, and Sweden. On April 4, 2024, Max released "My Oh My" as a standalone single. On August 9, 2024, Max was featured on a remix of "Brought the Heat Back" by South Korean band Enhypen. On September 20, 2024, she released "Spot a Fake". On October 18, 2024, she released "Forever Young" with David Guetta and Alphaville, a reworked version of Alphaville's hit "Forever Young". On November 20, 2024, Max performed a medley of four of her songs at the 2024 ARIA Music Awards in Sydney, Australia. The following month, Max released her Christmas single, "1 Wish".

In February 2025, Max released "Lost Your Faith", which would later become the first official single from her upcoming album. Three months later, she announced her third album, Don't Click Play, would be released on August 22, 2025. The album's second single, "Lovin Myself" was released on May 29, 2025. Max released the album's third single, "Wet, Hot American Dream", on July 1, 2025, and performed it at the Macy's 4th of July Fireworks Spectacular.

In June 2025, Max announced a North American tour to support Don't Click Play but postponed it two weeks later. Max took a hiatus from social media the following month after posting a TikTok with the caption "Busy over here evolving". Although many news outlets questioned whether the album would come out, she returned to social media 12 hours before the release of Don't Click Play, posting on Instagram with the caption "In due time, I have so much to say. But for now, Don't Click Play." According to Max, her social media hiatus was due to a transition in management, stating that "Ava Max is the most mismanaged pop star ever."

Don't Click Play was Max's first album to fail to chart on the Billboard 200 but reached number 12 on the Billboard Dance Album charts, as well as charted internationally. (Note: Sources:)

In late 2025, Max's unreleased song "One Night", recorded in 2023 and intended to appear on Diamonds & Dancefloors, started being played on Hungarian radiostation Rádió 1. It later debuted at number 17 on the Hungarian radio chart on the issue dated September 25, 2025 and reached number 5 on the issue dated October 16, scoring Max's 13th top five hit on the chart. According to the Hungarian Recording Industry Association, "One Night" was the 57th most-consumed song on Hungarian radios in 2025, spending 14 weeks on the chart, despite never getting an official release.

=== 2026–present: Departure from Atlantic Records, upcoming fourth studio album ===
In February 2026, Max cleared her social media pages, leaving a caption of "God save the Queen" and a portrait of Elizabeth II. On February 19, she revealed that she had departed from Atlantic Records. She started to upload several teaser videos for her then-upcoming single; on February 24, she announced the single "Kill It Queen" alongside its release date and cover artwork. Following her departure from Atlantic Records, Max signed a partnership agreement with Artist Partner Group (APG); it allows her to release music independently through her own company, Ava Brands LLC, while retaining ownership of her master recordings. On March 14, Max teased her next single through her social media, sharing its two snippets. On April 13, Max announced that "Outta Your Mind", the second single of her upcoming fourth studio album, will be released on April 15. However, the single was eventually titled "Out of Your Mind", following its release. The release was accompanied by a lyric video distributed through her official channels on the same date. Her collaboration with American rapper Bia titled "Energy" appeared on the FIFA World Cup 2026 Album, which was released on June 5, 2026.

== Artistry and influences ==
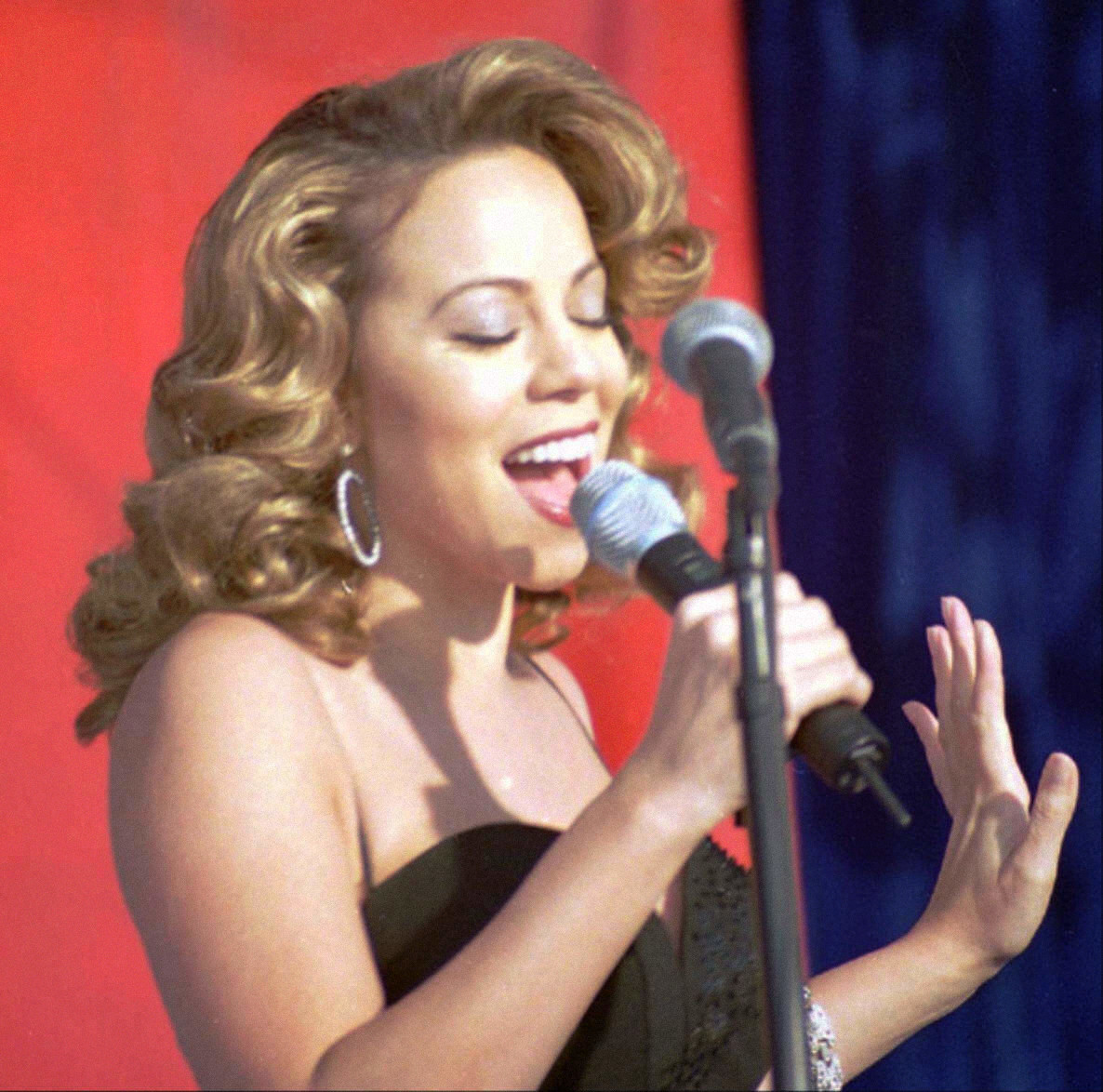
Max has cited Mariah Carey as her "number one" musical influence, stating that she grew up listening to Carey's music on loop.

Max has been labeled as a pop, dance-pop, and electropop singer, whose music often contains interpolations from previous songs. She has been compared to contemporary artists such as Sia, Lady Gaga, Bebe Rexha, Sigrid and Dua Lipa. Max grew up listening to artists including Alicia Keys, Norah Jones, Celine Dion, Aretha Franklin, Fugees, Mariah Carey and Whitney Houston. She also cited Beyoncé, Madonna, Gwen Stefani, Fergie, Britney Spears, Christina Aguilera, and Gaga as some of her influences. Max stated that Carey was the biggest influence on Heaven & Hell and recalled how she grew up listening to her music on loop, such as "Vision of Love".

=== Public image ===
It was funny, 'cause I was actually experimenting with different haircuts and colors, pink hair, blue hair, all that kind of stuff. Nothing felt like me. One day I cut my hair, my actual hair, cut it on the right side, and I remember I had something in the oven; I think they were chocolate-chip cookies. And I run downstairs without cutting the other side. I run downstairs, and then I'm like, 'Oh my God, [the cookies] almost burnt.' As I'm going [back] upstairs, I see in the mirror my reflection and the haircut, and...I literally tilted my head, like, why does this feel like me? It felt like me, like I had found myself.

— Max on the formation of the "Max cut"

Max has often been compared to Lady Gaga for her music and "ostentatious presentation", which includes her platinum blonde hair, persona, and stage name. Chris DeVille of Stereogum criticized Max's music for being too similar to Gaga, stating that it "falls short in terms of lyrics, production, melody, dynamics, personality, and every other conceivable metric", despite recognizing that the latter was also highly compared to Madonna. Max responded to the comparisons, stating that while Gaga was an "incredible" artist, people should not compare her to other people only for having the same hair color and releasing pop music. Although she described the comparisons as "lazy", she understood that it is "an easy thing to do" after being fascinated with pop artists since her childhood.

Max acknowledged that she often goes against the grain while making public appearances, seeking overlooked designers and wearing outlandish outfits "to give people an experience". She stated that she was influenced by fashion in the 1990s, citing Gwen Stefani and Cindy Crawford as influences. However, Max preferred making music in the studio over appearing in public, stating that she did not like the attention of the fashion and cameras on the red carpet.

Max's self-cut "Max cut" hairstyle consists of her asymmetric peroxide blonde hair parted down the center, with the right side being a chin-length bob cut and the left side longer and wavy. She explained that she did not feel authentic with her normal haircut and that it was about embracing herself and being unique. While interviewed by Audacy in 2020, Max described her hair as "symbolic of having the freedom to do your own thing" and a "visual representation of her self expression", stating that it was an escape from conformity.

== Personal life ==
Max has described herself as "100% Albanian" and stated that she wants to give back to the community. She speaks Albanian but cannot read it. Max is outspoken about female empowerment, which is reflected in her music. In a 2023 interview with Nylon, Max revealed that she dated Canadian record producer and songwriter Cirkut briefly after they met, and they remained friends until an abrupt falling out in 2024.

== Discography ==
Studio albums

- Heaven & Hell (2020)
- Diamonds & Dancefloors (2023)
- Don't Click Play (2025)

== Tours ==
=== Headlining ===
- On Tour (Finally) (2023)
- Don't Click Play Tour (2025; canceled)

Supporting

- Maroon 5 – 2021 Tour (2021)
- Jingle Ball Tour (2022)
