= List of artists who reached number one in Hungary =

This is a Complete list of recording artists who have reached number one on the Mahasz Rádiós Top 40 airplay chart in Hungary since May 2002.*(in Hungarian) Hungarian Airplay Chart - Archives from 2002 to present.

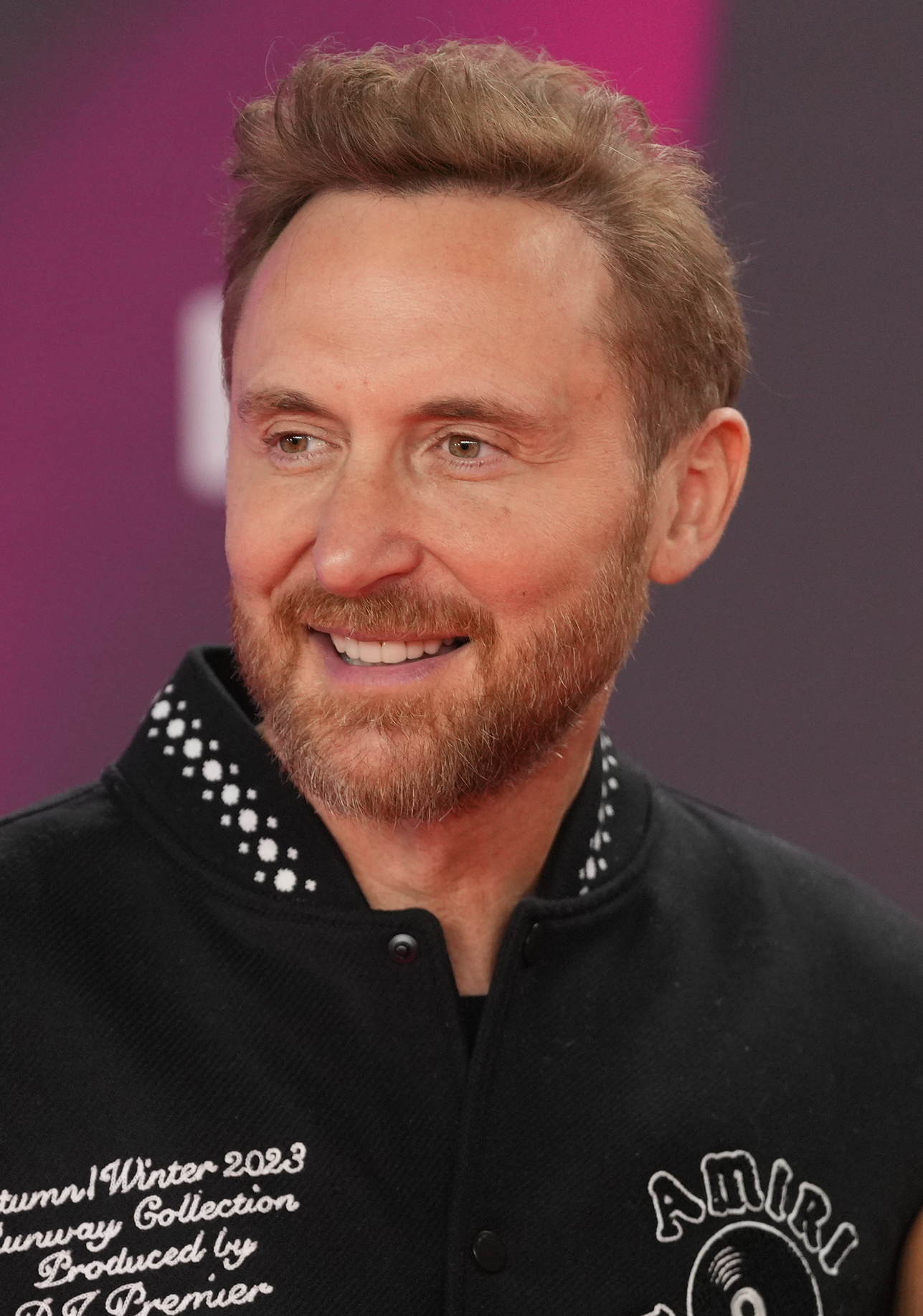
David Guetta scored 13 number ones, the most and among all Male artists.

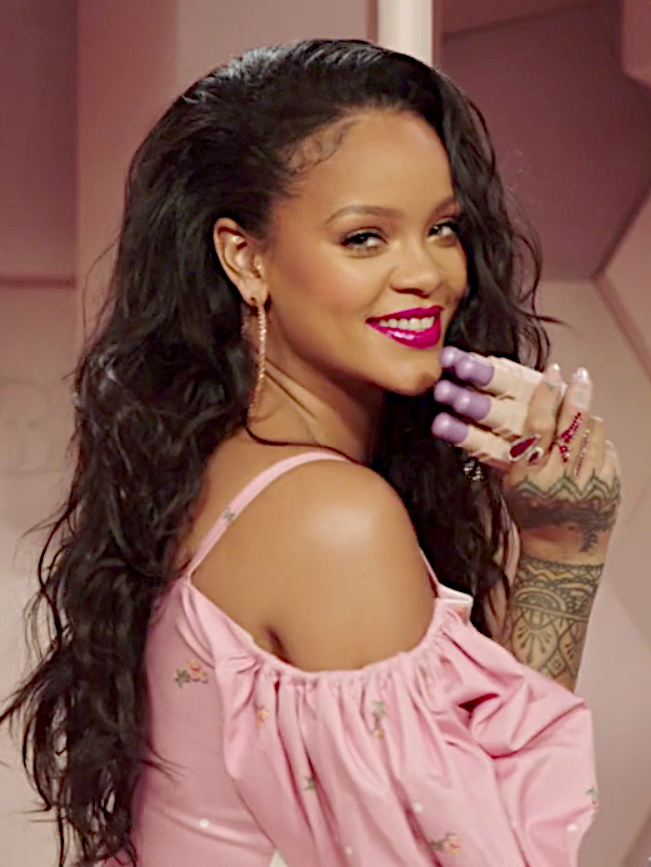
Rihanna scored 10 number ones, holding the record for most number ones among Female artists.

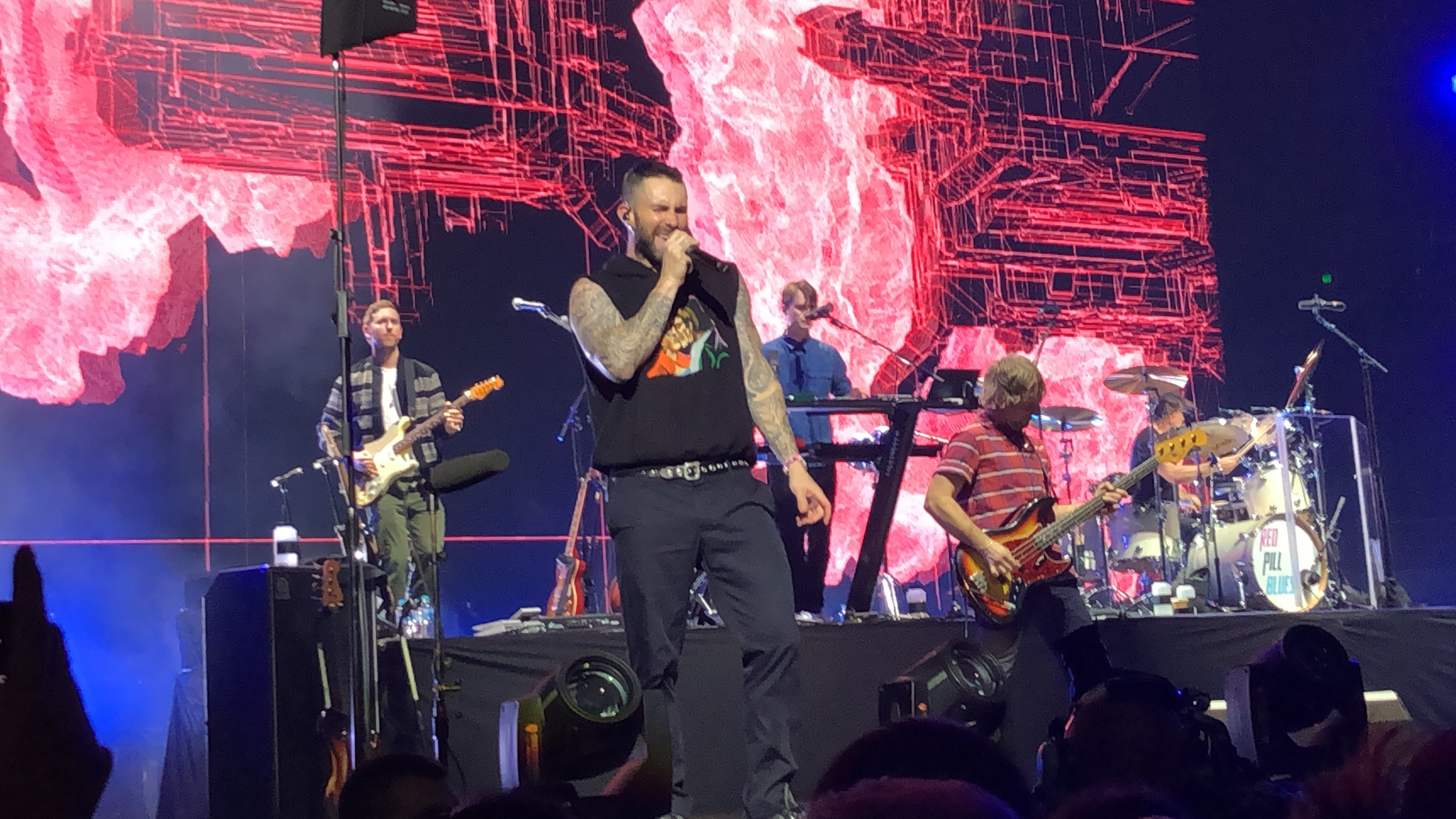
Maroon 5 hold the record for the most number-one singles for a band with 5.

- All acts are listed alphabetically.
- Solo artists are alphabetized by last name (unless they use only their first name, e.g. Akon, listed under A), Groups by group name excluding "a," "an" and "the."
- Featured artists that have been given credit on the record are included

== A ==
- A7S (2)
- Bryan Adams (1)
- Tóth Abigél (1)
- Adele (2)
- Afrojack (1)
- Agebeat & Kovary (1)
- Christina Aguilera (1)
- Akcent (1)
- Akon (1)
- Ákos (1)
- Alcazar (1)
- Alesso (1)
- Alok (3)
- Alphaville (1)
- Anastacia (1)
- Anne-Marie (2)
- Stevie Appleton (1)
- ATB (1)
- Au/Ra (1)
- The Avener (1)
- Avicii (9)
- Asaf Avidan (1)
- Axwell & Ingrosso (1)

== B ==
- B.o.B (1)
- Backstreet Boys (1)
- Baby Gabi (1)
- Gnarls Barkley (1)
- Gary Barlow (1)
- Dash Berlin (1)
- Lauren Bennett (1)
- Beyoncé (2)
- Justin Bieber (1)
- Black Eyed Peas (1)
- Aloe Blacc (1)
- Blond:ish
- Blue (1)
- Jonas Blue (1)
- James Blunt (3)
- DJ Bobo (1)
- Bogi (1)
- Brando (1)
- ByeAlex (2)

== C ==
- Camila Cabello (2)
- Graham Candy (1)
- Mariah Carey (1)
- Kelly Clarkson (1)
- Clean Bandit (3)
- Club 54 (1)
- Cheryl Cole (1)
- Phil Collins (1)
- Cookin' on 3 Burners (1)
- The Corrs (1)
- Joel Corry (3)
- Cyril (2)
- Miley Cyrus (2)

== D ==
- Gigi D'Agostino (2)
- Daft Punk (1)
- Dakota (1)
- Ray Dalton (3)
- Craig David (1)
- Jason Derulo (1)
- Janieck Devy (1)
- Dido (1)
- Disturbed (1)
- Alesha Dixon (1)
- Duffy (1)
- Duran Duran (1)
- Dynoro (1)

== E ==
- Fleur East (1)
- Steve Edwards (1)
- Billie Eilish (1)
- Eminem (1)
- Nathan Evans (1)
- Example (1)

== F ==
- Alle Farben (2)
- Gia Farrell (1)
- Farruko (1)
- Fast Boy (1)
- Felix (1)
- Fergie (1)
- Sam Feldt (2)
- Melanie Fiona (1)
- Florence and the Machine (1)
- Luis Fonsi (1)
- Freshlyground (1)
- Flo Rida (2)
- Nelly Furtado (3)

== G ==
- Lady Gaga (7)
- Galantis (1)
- Martin Garrix (1)
- Gayle (1)
- Jess Glynne (2)
- Tom Grennan (1)
- Selena Gomez (1)
- Goodboys (1)
- GoonRock (1)
- Gotye (1)
- Ellie Goulding (1)
- GrooveHouse (2)
- David Guetta (13)

== H ==
- Charlotte Haining (1)
- Calvin Harris (9)
- Gábor Heincz (1)
- Oliver Heldens (1)
- Ella Henderson (2)
- Keri Hilson (1)
- Hooligans (3)
- Hugel (1)
- Hurts (1)
- Hypaton (1)
- James Hype (1)

== I ==
- Enrique Iglesias (1)
- Imagine Dragons (1)
- Natalie Imbruglia (1)
- In-Grid (1)
- Inna (1)
- Ilira (2)

== J ==
- Felix Jaehn (1)
- Jay-Z (1)
- Jax Jones (2)
- Jaxomy (1)
- Carly Rae Jepsen (1)
- Jessie J (1)
- Jex (1)
- JID (1)
- Juanes (2)
- Jem (1)
- Elton John (2)
- JXL (1)

== K ==
- Lu Kala (1)
- Fritz Kalkbrenner (1)
- Kamrad (4)
- Kaskade (1)
- Alex Kenjj (1)
- Dermot Kennedy (1)
- Kesha (2)
- Las Ketchup (1)
- Alicia Keys (1)
- Master KG (1)
- The Kid Laroi (1)
- Ilan Kidron (1)
- DJ Khaled (1)
- Wiz Khalifa (1)
- Kimbra (1)
- Sean Kingston (1)
- Viktor Király (2)
- Lenny Kravitz (1)
- Chad Kroeger (1)
- K.Maro (1)
- Kungs (2)
- Kwabs (1)
- Kygo (3)

== L ==
- LA Vision (1)
- Kendrick Lamar (1)
- Adam Lambert (1)
- Lányi Lala (1)
- Zara Larsson (1)
- Latto (1)
- Magna Cum Laude (1)
- Lemar (1)
- Leona Lewis (1)
- Coi Leray (1)
- Regan Lili (1)
- Lilly Wood and the Prick (1)
- Rosa Linn (1)
- Little Mix (1)
- Dua Lipa (5)
- LMFAO (1)
- Lotfi Begi (2)
- Jennifer Lopez (1)
- Loreen (1)
- Lost Frequencies (5)
- Loud Luxury (1)
- Demi Lovato (1)

== M ==
- MØ (1)
- Mabel (1)
- Tate McRae (1)
- Madcon (1)
- Mad'House (1)
- Madonna (7)
- Major Lazer (1)
- Skip Marley (1)
- Maroon 5 (5)
- Bruno Mars (4)
- Marshmello (1)
- Norma Jean Martine (2)
- Sam Martin (1)
- maryjo (1)
- Conor Maynard (1)
- Ava Max (7)
- Tate McRae (1)
- Meduza (1)
- Sérgio Mendes (1)
- Shawn Mendes (1)
- Mihály Mező (1)
- M.I.A. (1)
- George Michael (1)
- Milk & Sugar (1)
- Nicki Minaj (1)
- Minelli (2)
- MK (1)
- MNEK (1)
- Moguai (1)
- Mr. Probz (1)

== N ==
- Nabiha (1)
- Nayer (1)
- Nea (1)
- Nelly (1)
- Ne-Yo (2)
- John Newman (1)
- Newik (1)
- Momcedo (1)
- Maty Noyes (1)

== O ==
- Oceana (1)
- Ofenbach (1)
- OMI (1)
- OneRepublic (3)
- Rita Ora (1)

== P ==
- Sean Paul (1)
- Halott Pénz (3)
- Katy Perry (6)
- Kim Petras (1)
- Henri PFR (1)
- Pink (5)
- Pitbull (2)
- Pixa & Stereo Palma (1)
- Elvis Presley (1)
- Purple Disco Machine (2)
- PULLMAXX & Martin Miller (1)
- The Pussycat Dolls (2)

== R ==
- R3Hab (2)
- Gigi Radics (2)
- Rag'n'Bone Man (2)
- Eros Ramazzotti (2)
- The Rasmus (1)
- Red Hot Chili Peppers (1)
- Bebe Rexha (3)
- Busta Rhymes (1)
- Rihanna (10)
- Riton (1)
- Szikora Robi (1)
- Nicky Romero (1)
- Mark Ronson (1)
- Miggy Dela Rosa (1)
- Kelly Rowland (2)
- Magdi Rúzsa (1)
- Kate Ryan (1)

== S ==
- Santana (1)
- Sash! (1)
- Matt Sassari (1)
- András Kállay-Saunders (1)
- Robin Schulz (4)
- Marc Scibilia (1)
- Conrad Sewell (1)
- Shakira (6)
- Ed Sheeran (3)
- Shouse (1)
- Sia (5)
- Sigala (1)
- Sigma (1)
- Eva Simons (1)
- Bob Sinclar (1)
- Sasha Alex Sloan (1)
- DJ Snake (1)
- Sam Smith (1)
- Snoop Dogg (1)
- Sonique (1)
- Alexandra Stan (1)
- Sting (1)
- Harry Styles (1)
- The Sugababes (1)
- Taylor Swift (2)
- Teddy Swims (3)
- Switch Disco (3)
- SZA (1)

== T ==
- TAKEOFFANDFLY (1)
- T.I. (1)
- Robin Thicke (1)
- Rob Thomas (1)
- Jasmine Thompson (1)
- Tiësto (1)
- Bryson Tiller (1)
- Justin Timberlake (3)
- Timbaland (3)
- Tomcraft (1)
- Tones and I (2)
- Topic (2)
- Train (2)

== U ==
- Unique (1)

== V ==
- Valmar (1)
- Vikkstar (1)
- Viktor Varga (1)
- Ella Vos (1)
- V-Tech (1)
- Vula (1)

== W ==
- Alan Walker (2)
- Alex Warren (1)
- The Weeknd (2)
- Well Hello (3)
- will.i.am (1)
- Pharrell Williams (3)
- Robbie Williams (3)
- Chris Willis (2)
- Amy Winehouse (1)
- Wisin (1)
- Kati Wolf (1)
- Ina Wroldsen (1)

== Y ==
- Daddy Yankee (1)
- Young Thug (1)

== Z ==
- Zanzibar (1)
- Zondering (1)

== See also ==
- List of number-one singles of the 2000s (Hungary)
- List of number-one singles of the 2010s (Hungary)
- List of number-one singles of the 2020s (Hungary)
- Mahasz
