= List of number-one singles of the 2020s (Hungary) =

This is a list of the songs that have reached number one on the Mahasz Rádiós Top 40 airplay chart during the 2020s. The issue date is the date the song began its run at number one during the decade.

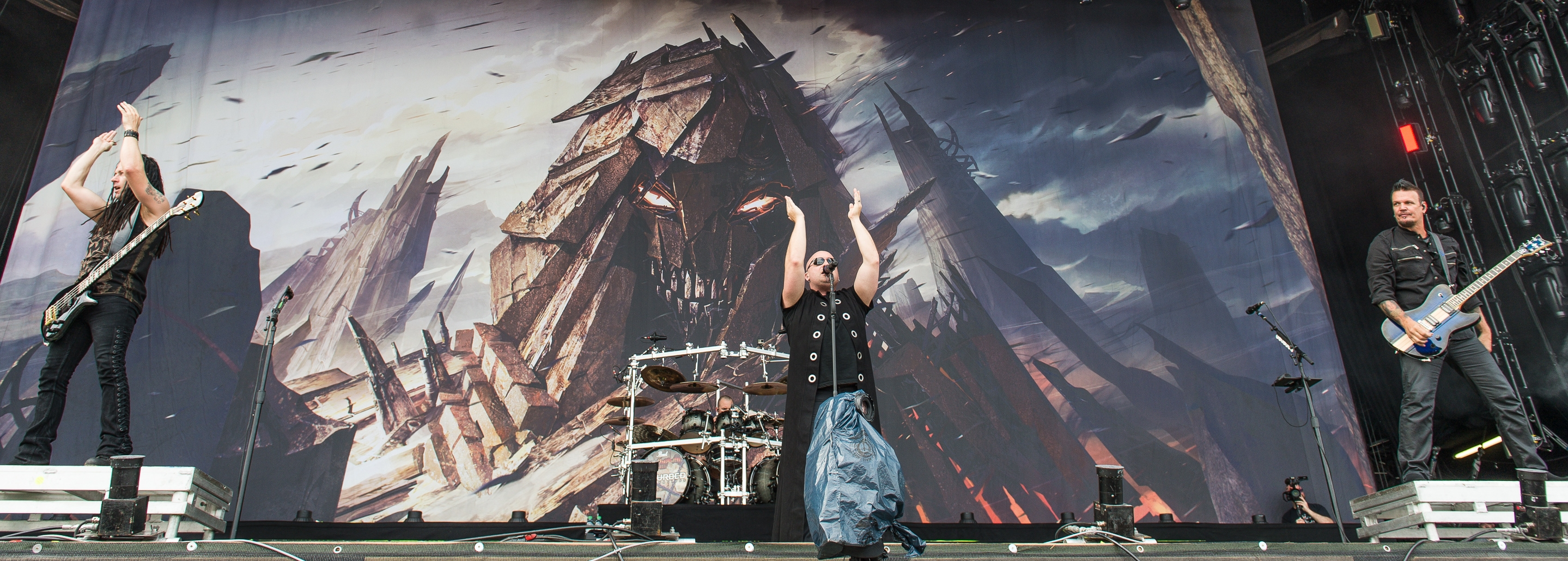
Disturbed topped the chart for 17 weeks with "The Sound of Silence the most by a single track this decade.

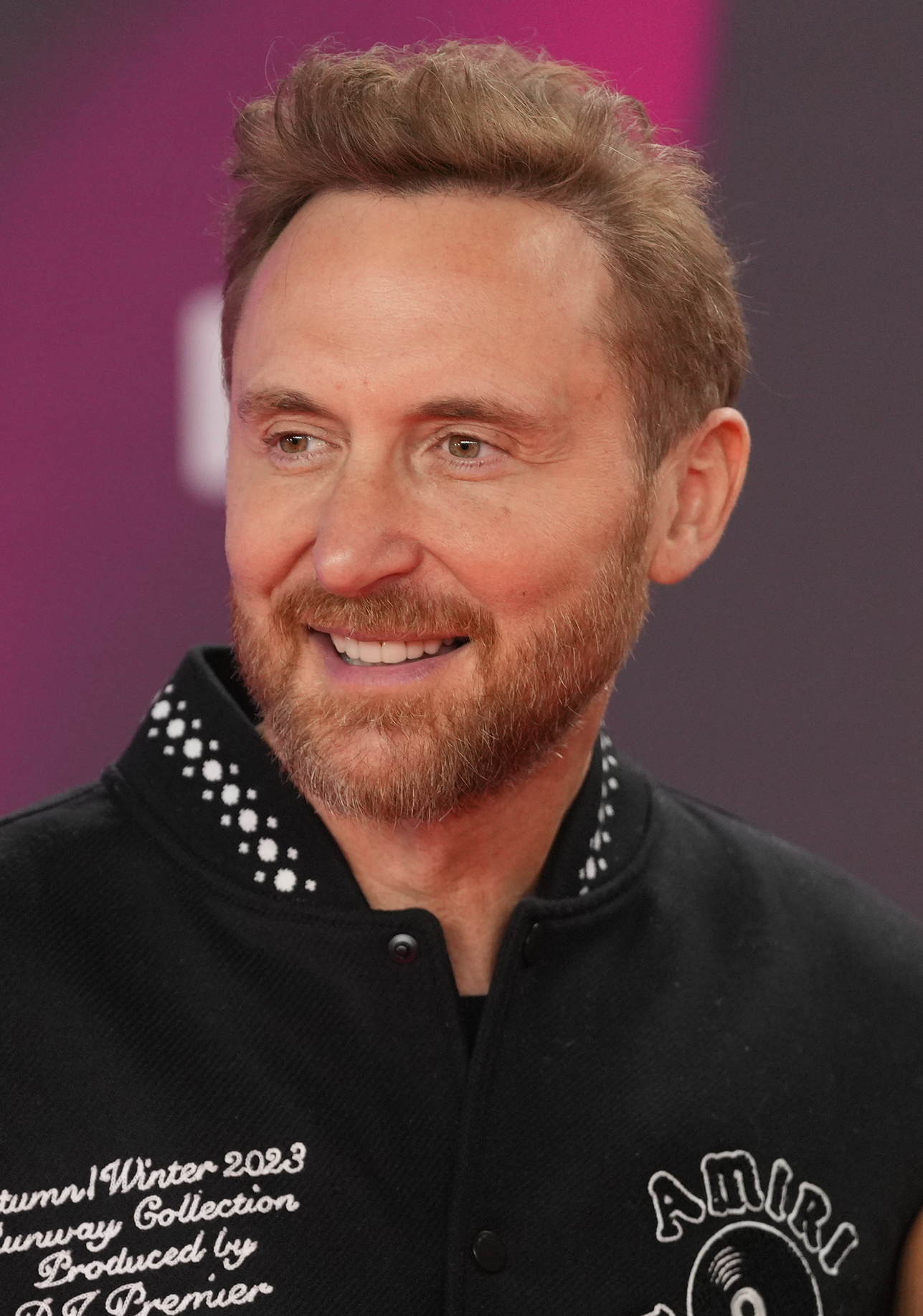
David Guetta has the most number-one songs this decade so far with eight.

Issue date	Song	Artist(s)	Weeks at number one
2020
3 January	"Dance Monkey"	Tones and I	5
7 February	"Turn Me On"	Riton and Oliver Heldens featuring Vula	1
14 February	"Don't Start Now"	Dua Lipa	3
6 March	"Turn Me On"	Riton and Oliver Heldens featuring Vula	2
20 March	"Don't Start Now"	Dua Lipa	1
27 March	"Turn Me On"	Riton and Oliver Heldens featuring Vula	1
3 April	"Don't Start Now"	Dua Lipa	1
10 April	"Turn Me On"	Riton and Oliver Heldens featuring Vula	5
15 May	"Blinding Lights"	The Weeknd	5
19 June	"Breaking Me"	Topic featuring A7S	13
25 September	"Some Say"	Nea	2
8 October	"Kings & Queens"	Ava Max	1
15 October	"Head & Heart"	Joel Corry and MNEK	8
11 December	"Midnight Sky"	Miley Cyrus	1
18 December	"Paradise"	Meduza featuring Dermot Kennedy	1
25 December	"Midnight Sky"	Miley Cyrus	1
2021
1 January	"Paradise"	Meduza featuring Dermot Kennedy	1
8 January	"Take You Dancing"	Jason Derulo	1
15 January	"Paradise"	Meduza featuring Dermot Kennedy	1
22 January	"Take You Dancing"	Jason Derulo	2
5 February	"Head & Heart"	Joel Corry and MNEK	2
19 February	"I Miss U"	Jax Jones and Au/Ra	1
26 February	"Paradise"	Meduza featuring Dermot Kennedy	1
5 March	"Head & Heart"	Joel Corry and MNEK	2
19 March	"Your Love (9PM)"	ATB, Topic and A7S	1
26 March	"Paradise"	Meduza featuring Dermot Kennedy	1
2 April	"I Miss You"	Jax Jones and Au/Ra	1
9 April	"Your Love (9PM)"	ATB, Topic and A7S	1
16 April	"Wellerman"	Nathan Evans	1
23 April	"Save Your Tears"	The Weeknd	2
7 May	"Wellerman"	Nathan Evans	1
14 May	"Save Your Tears"	The Weeknd	1
21 May	"Wellerman"	Nathan Evans	1
28 May	"Save Your Tears"	The Weeknd	1
4 June	"Jerusalema"	Master KG featuring Nomcebo	1
11 June	"Save Your Tears"	The Weeknd	1
18 June	"Wellerman"	Nathan Evans	2
2 July	"Bad Habits"	Ed Sheeran	9
9 September	"Stay"	The Kid Laroi and Justin Bieber	1
16 September	"By Your Side"	Calvin Harris featuring Tom Grennan	1
23 September	"Bongo Cha Cha Cha"	Goodboys	1
30 September	"Stay"	The Kid Laroi and Justin Bieber	1
7 October	"Cold Heart"	Elton John and Dua Lipa	1
14 October	"Heartbreak Anthem"	Galantis, David Guetta and Little Mix	3
4 November	"Take You Dancing"	Jason Derulo	1
11 November	"By Your Side"	Calvin Harris featuring Tom Grennan	3
2 December	"My Head & My Heart"	Ava Max	1
9 December	"Take You Dancing"	Jason Derulo	1
16 December	"Bongo Cha Cha Cha"	Goodboys	1
23 December	"Take You Dancing"	Jason Derulo	1
30 December	"My Head & My Heart"	Ava Max	2
2022
13 January	"Bongo Cha Cha Cha"	Goodboys	2
27 January	"My Head & My Heart"	Ava Max	1
3 February	"Sacrifice"	Bebe Rexha	2
17 February	"Hollywood"	LA Vision and Gigi D'Agostino	1
24 February	"Happiness"	Tomcraft featuring Moguai & Ilira	1
3 March	"Miles to Go"	Kaskade and Ella Vos	1
10 March	"Hollywood"	LA Vision and Gigi D'Agostino	1
17 March	"ABCDEFU"	Gayle	5
21 April	"Hollywood"	LA Vision and Gigi D'Agostino	1
28 April	"ABCDEFU"	Gayle	3
19 May	"Úristen"	Valmar featuring Szikora Robi	1
26 May	"ABCDEFU"	Gayle	1
2 June	"Rampampam"	Minelli	1
9 June	"ABCDEFU"	Gayle	1
16 June	"Rampampam"	Minelli	1
23 June	"ABCDEFU"	Gayle	2
7 July	"Pepas"	Farruko	1
14 July	"ABCDEFU"	Gayle	1
21 July	"Pepas"	Farruko	3
11 August	"Maybe You're the Problem"	Ava Max	2
25 August	"Ferrari"	James Hype featuring Miggy Dela Rosa	1
1 September	"Maybe You're the Problem"	Ava Max	1
8 September	"Ferrari"	James Hype featuring Miggy Dela Rosa	1
15 September	"Maybe You're the Problem"	Ava Max	1
22 September	"Enemy"	Imagine Dragons and JID	1
29 September	"ABCDEFU"	Gayle	2
14 October	"MMM"	Minelli	1
21 October	"Won't Forget You"	Shouse	2
3 November	"I Believe"	Kamrad	3
24 November	"As It Was"	Harry Styles	1
1 December	"I Believe"	Kamrad	1
8 December	"Million Dollar Baby"	Ava Max	2
22 December	"I'm Good (Blue)"	David Guetta and Bebe Rexha	3
2023
12 January	"Million Dollar Baby"	Ava Max	3
2 February	"I Ain't Worried"	OneRepublic	1
9 February	"I'm Good (Blue)"	David Guetta and Bebe Rexha	4
16 March	"10:35"	Tiësto and Tate McRae	2
30 March	"Flowers"	Miley Cyrus	11
22 June	"Feel Alive"	Kamrad	2
6 July	"Baby Don't Hurt Me"	David Guetta, Anne-Marie and Coi Leray	1
13 July	"I'm Good (Blue)"	David Guetta and Bebe Rexha	1
20 July	"10:35"	Tiësto and Tate McRae	1
27 July	"Baby Don't Hurt Me"	David Guetta, Anne-Marie and Coi Leray	2
10 August	"Dance the Night"	Dua Lipa	8
29 September	"Feel Like Summer"	Kamrad	1
6 October	"Flowers"	Miley Cyrus	1
13 October	"Rock My Body"	R3Hab, Inna and Sash!	1
20 October	"Substitution"	Purple Disco Machine and Kungs	1
27 October	"React"	Switch Disco featuring Ella Henderson	2
10 November	"Rock My Body"	R3Hab, Inna and Sash!	1
17 November	"Hero"	Alan Walker and Sasha Alex Sloan	1
24 November	"Car Keys (Ayla)"	Alok and Ava Max	2
8 December	"The Feeling"	Lost Frequencies	1
15 December	"Rock My Body"	R3Hab, Inna and Sash!	2
29 December	"Lottery"	Latto featuring Lu Kala	1
2024
5 January	"Greedy"	Tate McRae	1
12 January	"Sweet Goodbye"	Robin Schulz	1
19 January	"Better Off (Alone, Pt. III)"	Alan Walker, Dash Berlin and Vikkstar	1
26 January	"Do It Again"	Ray Dalton	2
9 February	"Better Off (Alone, Pt. III)"	Alan Walker, Dash Berlin and Vikkstar	1
16 February	"Substitution"	Purple Disco Machine and Kungs	1
23 February	"Better Off (Alone, Pt. III)"	Alan Walker, Dash Berlin and Vikkstar	2
8 March	"Drinkin'"	Joel Corry and MK featuring Rita Ora	1
15 March	"Rock My Body"	R3Hab, Inna and Sash!	1
22 March	"Can't Tame Her"	Zara Larsson	1
29 March	"Do It Again"	Ray Dalton	1
5 April	"Better Off (Alone, Pt. III)"	Alan Walker, Dash Berlin and Vikkstar	1
12 April	"Car Keys (Ayla)"	Alok and Ava Max	1
19 April	"The Sound of Silence"	Disturbed	1
26 April	"When We Were Young"	David Guetta and Kim Petras	1
3 May	"The Sound of Silence"	Disturbed	1
10 May	"When We Were Young"	David Guetta and Kim Petras	1
17 May	"The Sound of Silence"	Disturbed	1
24 May	"Overdrive"	Ofenbach featuring Norma Jean Martine	1
31 May	"The Sound of Silence"	Disturbed	2
14 June	"Do It Again"	Ray Dalton	1
21 June	"Deep in Your Love"	Alok and Bebe Rexha	1
28 June	"The Sound of Silence"	Disturbed	1
5 July	"Deep in Your Love"	Alok and Bebe Rexha	1
12 July	"The Sound of Silence"	Disturbed	2
26 July	"Stumblin' In"	Cyril	1
2 August	"The Sound of Silence"	Disturbed	2
16 August	"Stumblin' In'"	Cyril	2
30 August	"The Sound of Silence"	Disturbed	2
13 September	"I Don't Wanna Wait"	David Guetta and OneRepublic	1
20 September	"Summer's Back"	Alok and Jess Glynne	1
27 September	"The Sound of Silence"	Disturbed	1
4 October	"Stumblin' In"	Cyril	1
11 October	"The Sound of Silence"	Disturbed	5
15 November	"Stumblin' In"	Cyril	2
29 November	"Cry Baby"	Clean Bandit, Anne-Marie and David Guetta	1
6 December	"Die with a Smile"	Lady Gaga and Bruno Mars	1
13 December	"Stumblin' In"	Cyril	1
20 December	"I Don't Wanna Wait"	David Guetta and OneRepublic	1
27 December	"Stumblin' In"	Cyril	1
2025
3 January	"Lifetimes"	Katy Perry	1
10 January	"Forever Young"	David Guetta featuring Alphaville and Ava Max	1
17 January	"Lifetimes"	Katy Perry	3
7 February	"Lose Control"	Teddy Swims	1
14 February	"Lifetimes"	Katy Perry	1
21 February	"Still Into You"	Cyril and maryjo	1
28 February	"Stumblin' In"	Cyril	1
7 March	"It Feels So Good"	Matt Sassari and HUGEL featuring Sonique	2
21 March	"The Door"	Teddy Swims	1
28 March	"It Feels So Good"	Matt Sassari and HUGEL featuring Sonique	1
4 April	"The Door"	Teddy Swims	1
11 April	"It Feels So Good"	Matt Sassari and HUGEL featuring Sonique	5
16 May	"The Door"	Teddy Swims	1
23 May	"It Feels So Good"	Matt Sassari and HUGEL featuring Sonique	2
6 June	"The Door"	Teddy Swims	1
13 June	"Beautiful People"	David Guetta and Sia	2
27 June	"It Feels So Good"	Matt Sassari and HUGEL featuring Sonique	1
4 July	"Be Mine"	Kamrad	1
11 July	"Be Alright"	Joel Corry	3
1 August	"Be Mine"	Kamrad	1
8 August	"Ordinary"	Alex Warren	1
15 August	"Good Life"	Fast Boy	1
22 August	"It Feels So Good"	Matt Sassari and HUGEL featuring Sonique	1
29 August	"Told You So"	Martin Garrix and Jex	1
5 September	"I Found You"	Switch Disco, Charlotte Haining and Felix	1
12 September	"Told You So"	Martin Garrix and Jex	1
19 September	"Wonderful Life 25"	Hurts and Purple Disco Machine	1
26 September	"Never Walk Alone"	Blond:ish and Stevie Appleton	2
10 October	"Be Mine"	Kamarad	1
17 October	"Told You So"	Martin Garrix and Jex	1
24 October	"Wonderful Life 25"	Hurts and Purple Disco Machine	1
31 October	"The Dead Dance"	Lady Gaga	1
7 November	"Headlights"	PULLMAXX & Martin Miller and TAKEOFFANDFLY	1
14 November	"The Dead Dance"	Lady Gaga	2
28 November	"Wonderful Life 25"	Hurts and Purple Disco Machine	1
5 December	"The Dead Dance"	Lady Gaga	1
12 December	"Be Mine"	Kamrad	1
19 December	"Headlights"	PULLMAXX & Martin Miller and TAKEOFFANDFLY	1
26 December	"The Dead Dance"	Lady Gaga	1
2026
2 January	"Wonderful Life 25"	Hurts and Purple Disco Machine	1
9 January	"Gone, Gone, Gone	David Guetta, Teddy Swims and Tones and I	4
6 February	"Wonderful Life 25"	Hurts and Purple Disco Machine	1
13 February	"The Fate of Ophelia"	Taylor Swift	1
20 February	"Wonderful Life 25"	Hurts and Purple Disco Machine	1
27 February	"Riptide"	Sigala and Jaxomy featuring Ilan Kidron	1
6 March	"Wonderful Life 25"	Hurts and Purple Disco Machine	1
13 March	"Abracadabra"	Lady Gaga	1
20 March	"Blue Heart"	Regan Lili and Chris Willis	1
27 March	"Outta My Head"	Hypaton, Norma Jean Martine and Henri PFR	1
3 April	"Blue Heart"	Regan Lili and Chris Willis	1
10 April	"Outta My Head"	Hypaton, Norma Jean Martine and Henri PFR	2
24 April	"Blood Running"	Ray Dalton	1
1 May	"Outta My Head"	Hypaton, Norma Jean Martine and Henri PFR	1
8 May	"Azizam"	Ed Sheeran	1
15 May	"Wonderful Life 25"	Hurts and Purple Disco Machine	3
5 June	"Heart Like Mine"	Sam Feldt featuring Rosa Linn	1
12 June	"Opalite"	Taylor Swift	1
19 June	"Heart Like Mine"	Sam Feldt featuring Rosa Linn	2
3 July	"Azizam"	Ed Sheeran	1
10 July	"The Fate Of Ophelia"	Taylor Swift	1
17 July	"Wonderful Life 25"	Hurts and Purple Disco Machine	1
24 July	"Sleep Tonight (This is the Life)"	Switch Disco, R3hab and Sam Feldt	1
31 July	"Bambole"	Alex Kenjj	1
7 August	"Sleep Tonight (This is the Life)"	Switch Disco, R3hab and Sam Feldt	1
14 August	"Bambole"	Alex Kenjj	1
21 August	"Sugar Daddy"	Tóth Abigél and Akcent	1
28 August	"Bambole"	Alex Kenjj	4
25 September	"Wonderful Life 25"	Hurts and Purple Disco Machine	2
9 October	"Bambole"	Alex Kenjj"	1
16 October	"Wonderful Life 25"	Hurts and Purple Disco Machine	1
23 October	"Live it All"	Lost Frequencies	1
30 October	"Bambole"	Alex Kenjj"	1
6 November	"Live it All"	Lost Frequencies	1

== See also ==
- List of artists who reached number one in Hungary
- List of number-one singles of the 2000s (Hungary)
- List of number-one singles of the 2010s (Hungary)
