= Rampampam =

Single by Minelli
- Released: 18 March 2021
- Genre: House, dance-pop
- Length: 3:20
- Label: Global
- Songwriter: Minelli
- Producer: Viky Red

Minelli singles chronology
"Discoteka" (2020)	"Rampampam" (2021)	"Nothing Hurts" (2021)

Music video
- "Rampampam" on YouTube

"Rampampam" is a song by Romanian singer and songwriter Minelli, released for digital download and streaming by Global Records on 18 March 2021 as a single. A house track, it was written by Minelli and produced by Viky Red. Lyrically, Minelli discusses a toxic relationship and the other partner's eventual revengeful feelings. Manuel Probst of Dance Charts gave the song a positive review upon release, praising its catchiness and Minelli's vocal delivery.

Commercially, "Rampampam" topped the official rankings in Bulgaria, Czech Republic, Hungary, the Commonwealth of Independent States (CIS), Lithuania and Russia. The song has been further certified triple platinum by the Polish Society of the Phonographic Industry (ZPAV). To promote "Rampampam", an accompanying music video was uploaded to the singer's YouTube channel simultaneously with the single's digital release. Directed by Kobzzon, it portrays Minelli and two other women pouring gasoline on a car which features a man trapped inside. The singer further performed the song on Romanian and Bulgarian radio stations throughout May and June 2021, respectively.

== Background and composition ==
Minelli, born Luisa Luca, is a Romanian singer, composer and songwriter signed to Global Records. In 2006, at the age of 16, she was part of the native girl band Wassabi formed by Marius Moga. Upon their disbandment, Minelli pursued a solo career, contributing features to LoL Deejays and Follow Your Instinct's "Portillia de bobo" (2013) and Dave Ramone's "Love On Repeat" (2016), which reached modest chart peaks in France and Germany, respectively. "Empty Spaces" (2017) eventually secured her a record deal with Ultra Records, and "Addicted" (2019) with Sickotoy and "Mariola" (2019) climbed to respective peaks of numbers two and one on the Romanian Airplay 100 ranking. As a songwriter, Minelli's portfolio includes songs such as Inna's "Flashbacks" (2021), which achieved success in Eastern Europe.

"Rampampam", a house track with slap house-inspired basslines, was composed by its songwriter Minelli and producer Viky Red. Minelli came up with the hook in around five minutes after Viky Red had presented her an instrumental. She went on to utilize the term "rampampam" in the lyrics, which is used to compare being hurt by a lover to shooting a gun. Overall, the track discusses a toxic relationship that ends in revenge. Minelli further stated about the song's meaning and her collaboration with Viky Red: "I think ["Rampampam"] brings a dose of courage and strength, even if the main theme is a relationship that has caused injuries. Every time I work with Viky Red the result is one that delights me, as well this time".

== Release and reception ==
"Rampampam" was first released as a single for digital download and streaming in Romania and Russia by Global Records on 18 March 2021. Two days later, the song was sent to Romanian radio stations. "Rampampam" was subsequently issued in various other territories on 18 June 2021 by Warner Music Poland, with alternative versions having also been made available, including a partly French language one. Seven of the several remixes created for "Rampampam" are featured on a remix EP distributed by Spinnin' Records. Upon release, Manuel Probst, writing for the German website Dance Charts, gave the song a positive review, concentrating his praise on the track's catchiness and Minelli's vocals. After having trended on several Shazam and Spotify charts worldwide, "Rampampam" topped the official rankings in Bulgaria, Czech Republic, Hungary, the Commonwealth of Independent States (CIS), Lithuania and Russia, while peaking at number two on charts in native Romania, Poland and Ukraine. On the week ending 28 August 2021, "Rampampam" reached number 139 on Billboard's Global Excl. U.S. chart. The song has been certified triple platinum by the Polish Society of the Phonographic Industry (ZPAV) in September 2022 for moving 150,000 units.

== Music video and promotion ==
An accompanying music video was uploaded to Minelli's YouTube channel on 18 March 2021. On 23 March 2021, the visual was sent to Romanian television channels. It was directed by Kobzzon, while Paul Tatcu served as the director of photography. The clip is centered around the revengeful lyrical content of the song, portraying Minelli and two other women in a dark room, pouring gasoline over a car which features a man locked inside. Interspersed scenes feature the singer surrounded by black balloons and sitting on a red chair, watching footage of the aforementioned man on an oversized display. The music video ends with Minelli holding a lighter in front of the car, suggesting her desire of setting it on fire. For further promotion of "Rampampam", the #DoTheRampampam challenge was introduced on TikTok in June 2021, yielding in more than 2,000 videos being created. Minelli performed the song live on several occasions, beginning with the Romanian radio stations Kiss FM and Pro FM on 9 and 24 May 2021, respectively. On 9 June 2021, the singer also made appearances to sing the track for the Bulgarian radios The Voice and NRJ.

== Track listing ==
- Digital download
1. "Rampampam" – 3:20
- Digital download (alternative versions)
1. "Rampampam" (French Version) – 3:18
2. "Rampampam" (BTTN Remix) – 2:55
3. "Rampampam" (DaWho Remix) – 3:17
4. "Rampampam" (DJ Dark and Mentol Remix) – 3:24
5. "Rampampam" (Ferki Remix) – 3:10
6. "Rampampam" (Filatov & Karas Remix) – 2:32
7. "Rampampam" (Get Better Remix) – 4:29
8. "Rampampam" (Hayasa G and Kazu Remix) – 3:07
9. "Rampampam" (Kean Dysso Remix) – 3:18
10. "Rampampam" (NALYRO Remix) – 3:10
11. "Rampampam" (Robert Cristian Remix) – 3:00
12. "Rampampam" (Vadim Adamov and Hardphol Remix) – 3:37
13. "Rampampam" (Vize and Averro Remix) – 2:46
14. "Rampampam" (Wh0 Remix) – 3:23
15. "Rampampam" (Partywithray Remix) – 3:23

== Charts ==
=== Weekly charts ===
2021–2022 weekly chart performance for "Rampampam"
Chart (2021–2022)	Peak position
Bulgaria Airplay (PROPHON)	1
CIS Airplay (TopHit)	1
CIS Airplay (TopHit) Filatov & Karas Remix	55
Croatia International Airplay (Top lista)	3
Czech Republic Airplay (ČNS IFPI)	1
Czech Republic Singles Digital (ČNS IFPI)	12
Germany Download (Official German Charts)	77
Global Excl. U.S. (Billboard)	139
Hungary (Dance Top 40)	2
Hungary (Rádiós Top 40)	1
Hungary (Single Top 40)	1
Hungary (Stream Top 40)	6
Lithuania (AGATA)	1
Poland Airplay (ZPAV)	2
Poland (Polish Airplay TV)	3
Romania (Airplay 100)	2
Romania Airplay (Media Forest)	1
Romania TV Airplay (Media Forest)	5
Russia Airplay (TopHit)	1
Russia Airplay (TopHit) Filatov & Karas Remix	68
Slovakia Singles Digital (ČNS IFPI)	68
Turkey International Airplay (Radiomonitor Türkiye)	4
Ukraine Airplay (TopHit)	2
Ukraine Airplay (TopHit) Filatov & Karas Remix	47

2023 weekly chart performance for "Rampampam"
Chart (2023)	Peak position
Belarus Airplay (TopHit)	53
CIS Airplay (TopHit)	60
Kazakhstan Airplay (TopHit)	20
Latvia Airplay (TopHit) Filatov & Karas Remix	131
Lithuania Airplay (TopHit)	81
Moldova Airplay (TopHit)	28
Romania Airplay (TopHit)	111
Russia Airplay (TopHit)	94
Ukraine Airplay (TopHit)	21

2024 weekly chart performance for "Rampampam"
Chart (2024)	Peak position
Belarus Airplay (TopHit)	100
CIS Airplay (TopHit)	88
Kazakhstan Airplay (TopHit)	73
Lithuania Airplay (TopHit)	55
Moldova Airplay (TopHit)	32
Romania Airplay (TopHit)	111
Russia Airplay (TopHit)	126
Ukraine Airplay (TopHit)	39

2025 weekly chart performance for "Rampampam"
Chart (2025)	Peak position
Belarus Airplay (TopHit)	108
Moldova Airplay (TopHit)	23
Russia Streaming (TopHit) (Note: The Russian Streaming chart was launched in late March 2025. Therefore, "Rampampam" did not have a full run on the chart.)	83
Ukraine Airplay (TopHit)	108

=== Monthly charts ===
2021 monthly chart performance for "Rampampam"
Chart (2021)	Peak position
CIS Airplay (TopHit)	1
CIS Airplay (TopHit) Filatov & Karas Remix	58
Czech Republic (Rádio Top 100)	4
Czech Republic (Singles Digitál Top 100)	16
Russia Airplay (TopHit)	2
Russia Airplay (TopHit) Filatov & Karas Remix	70
Slovakia (Singles Digitál Top 100)	69
Ukraine Airplay (TopHit)	3
Ukraine Airplay (TopHit) Filatov & Karas Remix	72

2022 monthly chart performance for "Rampampam"
Chart (2022)	Peak position
CIS Airplay (TopHit)	23
Czech Republic (Rádio Top 100)	21
Czech Republic (Singles Digitál Top 100)	43
Russia Airplay (TopHit)	41
Ukraine Airplay (TopHit)	8

2023 monthly chart performance for "Rampampam"
Chart (2023)	Peak position
Belarus Airplay (TopHit)	64
CIS Airplay (TopHit)	64
Kazakhstan Airplay (TopHit)	20
Moldova Airplay (TopHit)	45
Ukraine Airplay (TopHit)	27

2024 monthly chart performance for "Rampampam"
Chart (2024)	Peak position
Kazakhstan Airplay (TopHit)	89
Lithuania Airplay (TopHit)	85
Ukraine Airplay (TopHit)	44

2025 monthly chart performance for "Rampampam"
Chart (2025)	Peak position
Russia Streaming (TopHit)	78

=== Year-end charts ===
2021 year-end chart performance for "Rampampam"
Chart (2021)	Position
Bulgaria Airplay (PROPHON)	2
CIS Airplay (TopHit)	5
Croatia International Airplay (Top lista)	49
Hungary (Dance Top 40)	42
Hungary (Single Top 40)	10
Hungary (Stream Top 40)	35
Poland (ZPAV)	15
Romania Airplay (Media Forest)	2
Russia Airplay (TopHit)	11
Ukraine Airplay (TopHit)	13

2022 year-end chart performance for "Rampampam"
Chart (2022)	Position
CIS Airplay (TopHit)	37
Hungary (Dance Top 40)	5
Hungary (Rádiós Top 40)	4
Hungary (Single Top 40)	11
Hungary (Stream Top 40)	53
Poland (ZPAV)	80
Russia Airplay (TopHit)	83
Ukraine Airplay (TopHit)	31

2023 year-end chart performance for "Rampampam"
Chart (2023)	Position
Belarus Airplay (TopHit)	89
CIS Airplay (TopHit)	78
Hungary (Dance Top 40)	23
Hungary (Rádiós Top 40)	87
Kazakhstan Airplay (TopHit)	94
Moldova Airplay (TopHit)	84
Poland (Polish Airplay Top 100)	79
Ukraine Airplay (TopHit)	31

2024 year-end chart performance for "Rampampam"
Chart (2024)	Position
Belarus Airplay (TopHit)	182
CIS Airplay (TopHit)	190
Hungary (Rádiós Top 40)	65
Moldova Airplay (TopHit)	174

2025 year-end chart performance for "Rampampam"
Chart (2025)	Position
Belarus Airplay (TopHit)	129
Hungary (Rádiós Top 40)	83
Moldova Airplay (TopHit)	65

== Certifications ==
Certifications and sales for "Rampampam"
Region	Certification	Certified units/sales
France (SNEP)	Gold	100,000^{‡}
Poland (ZPAV)	3× Platinum	150,000^{‡}
^{‡} Sales+streaming figures based on certification alone.

== Release history ==
Release dates and formats for "Rampampam"
Country	Date	Format(s)	Label	Ref.
Romania	18 March 2021	Digital download; streaming	Global	
Romania	20 March 2021	Radio airplay	Global	
Russia	18 March 2021	Digital download; streaming	Global	
Various	18 June 2021	Digital download; streaming	Warner	

== See also ==
- List of Media Forest most-broadcast songs of the 2020s in Romania
- List of number-one songs of the 2020s (Czech Republic)
- List of number-one singles of the 2020s (Hungary)
- List of music released by Romanian artists that has charted in major music markets
