= Bonanza Banzai =

Hungarian synth-pop band

Bonanza Banzai (Hungarian Depeche Mode)
- Origin: Budapest, Hungary
- Genres: Synth-pop
- Years active: 1988–1995
- Past members: Zsolt Hauber; Ákos Kovács; Gábor Menczel

Bonanza Banzai was a popular Hungarian synth-pop band formed in Budapest in 1988. Their sound was based on the synth-pop genre, and they were known as the "Hungarian Depeche Mode".

The band released a total of eight studio albums and two live albums, of which five became gold.

After six years of recording music, the band broke up in 1994. Their lead vocalist Ákos Kovács has maintained a solo career since.

== Members ==
- Zsolt Hauber – synthesizer, piano, percussion
- Ákos Kovács – vocals, guitar, drums
- Gábor Menczel – synthesizer

== Discography ==
- 1989 – Induljon a banzáj!
- 1990 – A jel
- 1990 – The Compilation
- 1991 – 1984
- 1991 – Pillanat emlékműve
- 1991 – Monumentum
- 1992 – Bonanza Live Banzai
- 1992 – Elmondatott
- 1993 – Régi és új
- 1994 – Jóslat
- 1995 – Búcsúkoncert
- 2008 – Bonanza Banzai DVD (appeared on the 20th anniversary of the debut of the band)
