= Hit Me Up (Gia Farrell song) =

2006 single by Gia Farrell

- iTunes cover

Single by Gia Farrell

from the album Happy Feet: Music from the Motion Picture
- Released: October 24, 2006
- Length: 3:15
- Label: Warner Sunset, Atlantic
- Songwriters: Brian Kierulf, Gia Farrell, Josh Schwartz
- Producers: Josh Schwartz, Polow da Don

Gia Farrell singles chronology
| "Christmas Everyday" (2006) | "Hit Me Up" (2006) | "New Religion" (2009) |

Alternative cover
- CD cover

"Hit Me Up" is the second single by American singer Gia Farrell. The song is included on the Happy Feet movie soundtrack. It was released as a digital-download single in October 2006 and became a top-10 hit in Australia, Finland, and Hungary the following year.

== Song information ==
The song is about a confident girl who gets attention everywhere she goes. She sings to a guy telling him to "hit me up". "To hit up", a term popularized by users of the social networking website MySpace, refers to contacting a person via electronic means. In this case there is a romantic interest for the person being "hit up".

"Hit Me Up" was used as the opening theme for Germany's Next Topmodel, Cycle 2 and as an official song for the 2007 CONCACAF Gold Cup soccer tournament. It was featured in a Wheat Thins commercial for their garden vegetable flavored crackers and gained attention again when it was performed in May 2008 by Syesha Mercado on American Idol's seventh season at the top three stage. The song was also in an episode of Gossip Girl, Season 1 Episode 2, The Wild Brunch, when the cooks are getting ready for Bart Bass Brunch. It was heard in a 2007 sizzle reel for Two and a Half Men.

== Chart performance ==
The song charted in several countries around the world. It reached number one in Hungary and entered the top 10 in Australia and Finland. In the United States, it peaked at number 40 on the Billboard Mainstream Top 40.

== Music video ==
In the video, the focus is on the Happy Feet theme, with Gia appearing in three different sets with dancers in the background while singing the song. A cameraman's hand gives Gia a spin before each transition. The only indications of the song having been on the Happy Feet soundtrack are one, when Gia is singing in front of a theatre and above her the cinema's marquee displays Happy Feet, and two, when in the middle of the video her backup dancers are seen in tuxedos and wearing costume penguin masks as they dance in an arctic scene.

== Track listings ==
Australian CD single

1. "Hit Me Up" (album version)
2. "Hit Me Up" (no taps version)
3. "Hit Me Up" (Matt "The Bratt" radio edit)

European CD single

1. "Hit Me Up" (album version)
2. "Hit Me Up" (Matt "The Bratt" radio edit)

German, Austrian, and Swiss CD single

1. "Hit Me Up" (album version)
2. "Hit Me Up" (no taps version)
3. "Hit Me Up" (Matt "The Bratt" radio edit)
4. "Hit Me Up" (video)

== Charts ==
=== Weekly charts ===
| Chart (2007) | Peak position |
|---|---|
| Australia (ARIA) | 6 |
| Austria (Ö3 Austria Top 40) | 67 |
| Belgium (Ultratop 50 Flanders) | 17 |
| Belgium (Ultratip Bubbling Under Wallonia) | 11 |
| Finland (Suomen virallinen lista) | 8 |
| Germany (GfK) | 29 |
| Hungary (Rádiós Top 40) | 1 |
| Hungary (Dance Top 40) | 19 |
| Netherlands (Dutch Top 40) | 17 |
| Netherlands (Single Top 100) | 25 |
| Portugal (AFP) | 49 |
| US Pop Airplay (Billboard) | 40 |

=== Year-end charts ===
| Chart (2007) | Position |
|---|---|
| Australia (ARIA) | 70 |
| Belgium (Ultratop 50 Flanders) | 86 |
| Hungary (Rádiós Top 40) | 31 |

== Release history ==
| Region | Date | Format(s) | Label(s) | Ref(s). |
|---|---|---|---|---|
| United States | 23 October 2006 | Contemporary hit radio | Lava | |
| Various | 24 October 2006 | Digital download | Warner Sunset; Atlantic | |
| Australia | 29 January 2007 | CD | Warner Sunset; Atlantic | |
