= Told You So (Martin Garrix and Jex song) =

2024 single by Martin Garrix and Jex

Single by Martin Garrix and Jex
- Released: 22 November 2024
- Genre: Dance-pop; house-pop; dance
- Length: 3:07
- Label: Stmpd; Eddie O Entertainment; Casablanca; Virgin
- Songwriters: Martijn Garritsen; Rob Grimaldi; Jordan Miller; Jeffrey David Burns
- Producers: Martin Garrix; Rob Grimaldi

Martin Garrix singles chronology
| "Gravity" (2024) | "Told You So" (2024) | "Angels for Each Other" (2025) |

Jex singles chronology
| "Where You Are" (2024) | "Told You So" (2024) |

Music video
- "Told You So" on YouTube

"Told You So" is a song by Dutch DJ and record producer Martin Garrix and American singer Jex. It was released as a single on 22 November 2024, through Stmpd Rcrds, Eddie O Entertainment, Casablanca Records and Virgin Records.

== Background ==
The collaboration originated after Jex posted a video on TikTok singing the hook of what would become "Told You So". Martin Garrix contacted her following the post and offered to develop the track together. Jex later explained that the song grew from a hook she had written alone in her apartment, describing the opportunity to work with Garrix as a dream come true. The track marked their first collaboration, with Garrix emphasizing the emotional immediacy of the idea and how naturally the production came together.

== Composition ==
"Told You So" is a dance-pop, house-pop and dance song that thematically explores the tension between vulnerability and hesitation in the context of romantic attraction. In the chorus, Jex sings 'Don't wanna hear my heart say, I told you so,' a line that encapsulates the fear of regret when taking an emotional risk. Through this motif, the song reflects on the instinctive leap into love despite uncertainty.

== Acoustic version ==
An acoustic version of "Told You So" was released on 14 February 2025. Unlike the original dance-oriented production, this rendition presents a stripped-down arrangement highlighting Jex's vocals accompanied by piano and guitar. Critics described it as a more intimate and emotive interpretation, with EDM.com characterizing it as a "haunting acoustic ballad" and Your EDM noting that the black-and-white music video emphasizes the song's lyrical vulnerability.

== Credits and personnel ==
Credits adapted from Tidal.

- Martin Garrix – production, composition, lyrics, guitar, master engineer, mixing engineer
- Rob Grimaldi – production, composition, lyrics
- Jex – composition, lyrics, vocals
- Jeffrey David Burns – composition, lyrics
- Peppe Folliero – master engineering, mixing engineering
- Mark Otten – guitar
- Osrin – co-production
- Frank van Essen – strings

== Charts ==
=== Weekly charts ===
Weekly chart performance for "Told You So"
| Chart (2024–2025) | Peak position |
|---|---|
| Belgium (Ultratop 50 Flanders) | 13 |
| CIS Airplay (TopHit) | 81 |
| Croatia International Airplay (Top lista) | 11 |
| Czech Republic Airplay (ČNS IFPI) | 21 |
| Estonia Airplay (TopHit) | 27 |
| Hungary (Rádiós Top 40) | 1 |
| Kazakhstan Airplay (TopHit) | 45 |
| Latvia Airplay (TopHit) | 1 |
| Lithuania Airplay (TopHit) | 17 |
| Malta Airplay (Radiomonitor) | 6 |
| Netherlands (Dutch Top 40) | 5 |
| Netherlands (Single Top 100) | 27 |
| New Zealand Hot Singles (RMNZ) | 38 |
| Romania (Romanian Radio Airplay) | 4 |
| Russia Airplay (TopHit) | 95 |
| Slovakia Airplay (ČNS IFPI) | 5 |
| Suriname (Nationale Top 40) | 10 |
| UK Singles Sales (OCC) | 76 |
| US Hot Dance/Electronic Songs (Billboard) | 25 |

=== Monthly charts ===
Monthly chart performance for "Told You So"
| Chart (2025) | Peak position |
|---|---|
| CIS Airplay (TopHit) | 90 |
| Estonia Airplay (TopHit) | 34 |
| Latvia Airplay (TopHit) | 1 |
| Lithuania Airplay (TopHit) | 16 |
| Romania Airplay (TopHit) | 31 |

=== Year-end charts ===
Year-end chart performance for "Told You So"
| Chart (2025) | Position |
|---|---|
| Belgium (Ultratop 50 Flanders) | 23 |
| Estonia Airplay (TopHit) | 93 |
| Hungary (Rádiós Top 40) | 24 |
| Latvia Airplay (TopHit) | 16 |
| Lithuania Airplay (TopHit) | 78 |
| Netherlands (Dutch Top 40) | 20 |
| Netherlands (Single Top 100) | 95 |
| Romania Airplay (TopHit) | 69 |

== Certifications ==
Certifications and sales for "Told You So"
| Region | Certification | Certified units/sales |
|---|---|---|
| Belgium (BRMA) | Gold | 20,000^{‡} |
^{‡} Sales+streaming figures based on certification alone.

== Release history ==
Release dates and formats for "Told You So"
| Region | Date | Format | Label | Ref. |
|---|---|---|---|---|
| Italy | 22 November 2024 | Radio airplay | Universal Music Italia | |
| Netherlands | 22 November 2024 | Digital download | STMPD RCRDS; Eddie O Entertainment; Casablanca; Virgin | |
