= Association of Hungarian Record Companies =

Hungarian music industry association

Magyar Hanglemezkiadók Szövetsége
- Formation: 1992
- Headquarters: Budapest, Hungary
- Website: http://www.mahasz.hu/

Hungarian Recording Industry Association (Hungarian: Magyar Hanglemezkiadók Szövetsége, more commonly abbreviated to MAHASZ or Mahasz) is the Hungarian music industry association, founded in 1992. MAHASZ issues the Hungarian Music Awards, awards music recording certification and maintains the music charts for Hungary.

== Charts ==
Mahasz runs the following weekly charts:

- Album Top 40
- Radio Top 40
- Editor's Choice Top 40
- Hungarian Radio Top 40
- Dance Top 40
- Single Top 40
- Stream Top 40

== Certification levels ==
Since 1 January 2018, MAHASZ combined all music recording certification into one combined "album" certifications, which includes albums and singles of all genres and origins. For Gold status an album needs to sell 2,000 units and for Platinum 4,000 units, where ten singles are counted as one album. The certification also includes streaming at a rate of 1,000 paid streams or 5,000 free streams per album.

== Certification levels history ==
Certifications have existed in Hungary since the mid-1970s. During that period, albums had to sell 50,000 units to qualify for Gold status and singles required 100,000 units.

Over the years, Mahasz awarded certifications for albums, singled and music videos (DVDs).

=== Albums ===
For pop albums, separate thresholds were in place for domestic repertoire and international repertoire, as follows.

Mahasz thresholds for pop domestic repertoire until 2018
Certification	Before 12 June 1992	Before 3 December 1997	Before 23 April 2002	Before 23 February 2005	Before 13 September 2006	Before 1 October 2009	Before 14 December 2012	Since 14 December 2012
Gold	100,000	50,000	25,000	15,000	10,000	7,500	5,000	2,000
Platinum	200,000	100,000	50,000	30,000	20,000	15,000	10,000	4,000
Diamond	400,000	200,000	—	—	—	—	—	—

Mahasz thresholds for pop international repertoire until 2018
Certification	Before 23 February 2005	Before 13 September 2006	Before 14 December 2012	Until 2018
Gold	10,000	5,000	3,000	1,000
Platinum	20,000	10,000	6,000	2,000

Mahasz certified classical music, jazz, world music and prose albums, requiring 1,500 units for Gold and 3,000 units for Platinum.

=== Singles ===
For singles, the same thresholds applied independent of the origin and genre.

Mahasz thresholds for singles until 2018
Certification	Before 23 February 2005	Before 13 September 2006	Before 13 September 2006
Gold	5,000	2,500	1,500
Platinum	10,000	5,000	3,000

=== Music videos (DVDs) ===
For music videos (DVDs), the same thresholds applied independent of the origin.

Mahasz thresholds for pop music videos (DVDs) until 2018
Certification	Before 13 September 2006	From 13 September 2006
Gold	3,000	2,000
Platinum	6,000	4,000

Jazz, classical, world music and prose DVDs were certified at 1,000 for Gold and 2,000 for Platinum.

== Highest certified albums ==
The highest certified albums by MAHASZ are Micsoda buli! by Hungária and Legendás dalok 1. by Locomotiv GT, both certified 10× Platinum in 2014. The highest certified international repertoire album is Mamma Mia! The Movie Soundtrack by the Mamma Mia! film cast, certified 6× Platinum in 2018. Below is a list of all albums that have been certified multi-platinum by MAHASZ, as of January 2025.

Album	Artist	Certification	Year certified
A ló túloldalán	Azahriah and Desh	15× Platinum	2024
Micsoda buli!	Hungária	10× Platinum	2014
Legendás dalok 1.	Locomotiv GT	10× Platinum	2014
Dolgozzátok fel!	Tankcsapda	8× Platinum	2019
10 klasszikus ünnepi dal	Kis karácsony, nagy karácsony	7× Platinum	2014
Ég és föld	Follow the Flow	7× Platinum	2021
Lazítani...	Géza Hofi	6× Platinum	2014
Legendás dalok 2.	Locomotiv GT	6× Platinum	2014
Urai vagyunk a helyzetnek	Tankcsapda	6× Platinum	2015
Kilenc	Kowalsky meg a Vega	6× Platinum	2018
Mamma Mia! The Movie Soundtrack	Mamma Mia! film cast	6× Platinum	2018
Ez a vonat, ha elindult, hadd menjen...	Csík zenekar	5× Platinum	2011
Rockmafia Debrecen	Tankcsapda	5× Platinum	2013
Best of Halász Judit 1.	Judit Halász	5× Platinum	2014
Best of Halász Judit 2.	Judit Halász	5× Platinum	2014
Egy perc az élet	László Komár	5× Platinum	2014
25	Adele	5× Platinum	2016
JUBILEUM 25 (Főnix Koncert)	Tankcsapda	5× Platinum	2018
Testamentum	Omega	5× Platinum	2022
A harmonikás	Márió	4× Platinum	2003
From Ravel to Vangelis	Xavér Varnus	4× Platinum	2008
Valahol egy lány - Koncz Zsuzsa tíz legszebb dala	Zsuzsa Koncz	4× Platinum	2014
Varázsszavak	Kowalsky meg a Vega	4× Platinum	2016
Árnyék és fény	Kowalsky meg a Vega	4× Platinum	2019
Liliput Hollywood	Tankcsapda	4× Platinum	2020
A döntőkben elhangzott dalok	Magdolna Rúzsa	3× Platinum	2006
Isten hozott a családban	Váradi Roma Café	3× Platinum	2008
My Christmas	Andrea Bocelli	3× Platinum	2010
Az első X - 10 dal az élő showból	Csaba Vastag	3× Platinum	2011
Szívest örömEst - Óévbúcsúztató koncert 2009	Csík zenekar	3× Platinum	2011
Az első X - 10 dal az élő showból	Nikolas Takács	3× Platinum	2011
História	Hooligans	3× Platinum	2013
Cserháti Zsuzsa 10 legnagyobb slágere	Cserháti Zsuzsa	3× Platinum	2014
Csak a név számít	Dynamic	3× Platinum	2014
÷	Ed Sheeran	3× Platinum	2014
R-Go 1983-2013	R-Go	3× Platinum	2014
A Táncdalfesztivál 10 nagy slágere 1.	Táncdalfesztivál	3× Platinum	2014
Társasjáték	Hooligans	3× Platinum	2015
Három rohadék rockcsempész - A huszonötödik év	Tankcsapda	3× Platinum	2017
Idősziget	Ákos	3× Platinum	2019
Jubileum Best Of	Hooligans	3× Platinum	2019
Ha nem tudom, nem fáj	Dupla KáVé	2× Platinum	2000
Ráncdalfesztivál	Irigy Hónaljmirigy	2× Platinum	2001
Dalban mondom el	Jimmy Zámbó	2× Platinum	2001
Hozzám tartozol	Fiesta	2× Platinum	2002
Hol a szerelem?	Márió	2× Platinum	2002
Unplugged	TNT	2× Platinum	2002
The Eminem Show	Eminem	2× Platinum	2003
Sárgarózsa	Márió	2× Platinum	2003
A hegedű hercegnői	Princess	2× Platinum	2003
Hegedűs a háztetőn - musicalrészletek	Géza Hofi	2× Platinum	2004
Nyugalomterápia	Caramel	2× Platinum	2006
Ördögi angyal	Magdi Rúzsa	2× Platinum	2006
Ragyogás	Nox	2× Platinum	2006
The Best of Andrea Bocelli: Vivere	Andrea Bocelli	2× Platinum	2007
Musical Duett	Bereczki Zoltán & Szinetár Dóra	2× Platinum	2007
Álomszép	Bizek Emi	2× Platinum	2007
Twenty Five	George Michael	2× Platinum	2007
A nagy mesemondó	Gyula Szabó	2× Platinum	2007
Confessions on a Dance Floor	Madonna	2× Platinum	2007
Loose	Nelly Furtado	2× Platinum	2007
Örömvölgy	Nox	2× Platinum	2007
Rudebox	Robbie Williams	2× Platinum	2007
Adieu les complexes	Beáta Palya	2× Platinum	2008
Espresso	Váradi Roma Café	2× Platinum	2008
e^{2}	Eros Ramazzotti	2× Platinum	2008
Black Ice	AC/DC	2× Platinum	2009
Egyszálének	Bea Palya	2× Platinum	2009
Michael Jackson's This Is It	Michael Jackson	2× Platinum	2009
Én leszek a játékszered	Bea Palya	2× Platinum	2010
The Fame/The Fame Monster	Lady Gaga	2× Platinum	2010
Az első X - 10 dal az élő showból	Király L. Norbi	2× Platinum	2011
Soldier of Love	Sade	2× Platinum	2011
Az első X - Az élő show-k 10 legnagyobb kedvence	Enikő Muri	2× Platinum	2012
Magyarország kedvenc gyerekdalai	Gyereklemez	2× Platinum	2012
Az első X - Az élő show-k 10 legnagyobb kedvence	Tibor Kocsis	2× Platinum	2012
Christmas	Michael Bublé	2× Platinum	2012
Delta Machine	Depeche Mode	2× Platinum	2014
Barna lány	Gigi Radics	2× Platinum	2014
Magdaléna Rúzsa	Magdi Rúzsa	2× Platinum	2014
Tizenegy	Magdolna Rúzsa	2× Platinum	2014
25	Szandi	2× Platinum	2014
Még egyszer	Ákos	2× Platinum	2015
Ghost Stories	Coldplay	2× Platinum	2015
Tribute album	Ganxsta Zolee and Kartel	2× Platinum	2015
A Head Full of Dreams	Coldplay	2× Platinum	2016
Még nem éden	Kowalsky meg a Vega	2× Platinum	2016
Fényárban és félhomályban	Ossian	2× Platinum	2020
Igaz történet	Hooligans	2× Platinum	2017
30 év legszebb balladái	Ossian	2× Platinum	2017
Az igazi szabadság	Ossian	2× Platinum	2017
Dalok a testnek, dalok a léleknek	Edda Művek	2× Platinum	2018
Aréna Koncert	Tankcsapda	2× Platinum	2018
50 - Jubileumi, akusztikus koncert	Ákos	2× Platinum	2019
Hazatalál	Ákos	2× Platinum	2019
Jég hátán	Hooligans	2× Platinum	2019
A reményhozó	Ossian	2× Platinum	2019
PMXV	Punnany Massif	2× Platinum	2019
Csak a jót	Ossian	2× Platinum	2020

== See also ==
- List of artists who reached number one in Hungary
- List of number-one singles of the 2000s (Hungary)
- List of number-one singles of the 2010s (Hungary)
- List of number-one singles of the 2020s (Hungary)
