= Ördögi angyal =

Ördögi Angyal

Studio album by Magdi Rúzsa
- Released: November 20, 2006
- Recorded: 2006
- Genre: Pop rock
- Length: 51:00
- Label: CLS
- Producers: Gábor Závodi; Gábor Presser

Magdi Rúzsa chronology
A döntőkben elhangzott dalok (2006)	Ördögi Angyal (2006)	T-Mobile Kapcsolat Koncert - 2007.06.30 (2007)

Ördögi angyal is the debut studio album by Hungarian singer Magdi Rúzsa, released on November 20, 2006, by CLS Records. The translated title reads Devilish Angel. It debuted at number one on Mahasz album chart and has been certified double-platinum in Hungary. Its first single was "Aprócska blues".

== Track listing ==
1. Aprócska blues - 2:59
2. Csak a zene - 4:55
3. Hip-hop - 3:43
4. Nem vagyok jó neked - 2:56
5. Új nap - 3:07
6. Eltévedt idegen - 4:22
7. Ciki ez a helyzet - 3:22
8. Álomangyal - 3:45
9. Szembejövő sáv - 2:57
10. Nem baj - 2:40
11. Nekem nem szabad - 3:33
12. Még egy dal - 3:44
13. A sors a neved - 4:13
14. Vigyázz a madárra - 4:38
