= List of number-one singles of the 2000s (Hungary) =

This is a list of the songs that have reached number one on the Mahasz Rádiós Top 40 airplay chart during the 2000s. The issue date is the date the song began its run at number one the first issue was on 13 May 2002.

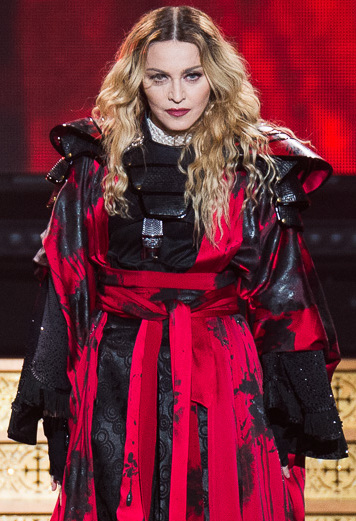
Madonna scored 6 number ones this decade, the most among all artists.

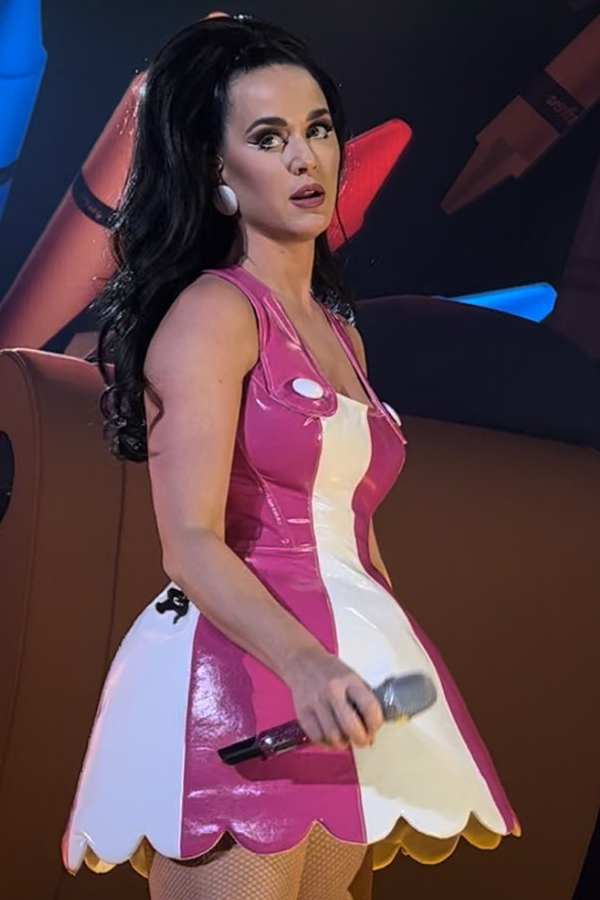
Katy Perry's "Hot n Cold" was at number one for 21 weeks.

Issue date	Song	Artist(s)	Weeks at number one
2002
13 May	"Whenever, Wherever"	Shakira	3
3 June	"Hajnal"	GrooveHouse	1
10 June	"Csillagtenger"	Unique	1
17 June	"Whenever, Wherever"	Shakira	1
24 June	"Hajnal"	GrooveHouse	3
15 July	"Like A Prayer"	Mad'House	4
12 August	"A Little Less Conversation"	Elvis Presley vs. JXL	5
16 September	"Like A Prayer"	Mad'House	1
23 September	"The Ketchup Song (Aserejé)"	Las Ketchup	12
16 December	"Tu es foutu"	In-Grid	3
2003
6 January	"Dilemma"	Nelly featuring Kelly Rowland	2
20 January	"Tu es foutu"	In-Grid	1
27 January	"Dilemma"	Nelly featuring Kelly Rowland	3
17 February	"Tu es foutu"	In-Grid	2
3 March	"Jenny from the Block"	Jennifer Lopez	1
10 March	"Objection (Tango)"	Shakira	2
24 March	"Jenny from the Block"	Jennifer Lopez	3
14 April	"Sorry Seems to Be the Hardest Word"	Blue and Elton John	2
28 April	"Őrült szerelem"	Baby Gabi & Lányi Lala	5
2 June	"Ének az esőben"	V-Tech	1
9 June	"Szerelemről szó sem volt"	Zanzibar	1
16 June	"Désenchantée"	Kate Ryan	1
23 June	"Szerelemről szó sem volt"	Zanzibar	1
30 June	"Desenchantée"	Kate Ryan	2
14 July	"Szerelemről szó sem volt"	Zanzibar	3
4 August	"Desenchantée"	Kate Ryan	1
11 August	"Chihuahua"	DJ Bobo	1
18 August	"The Rise and Fall"	Craig David and Sting	1
25 August	"I Know What You Want"	Busta Rhymes and Mariah Carey	12
17 November	"Un'emozione per sempre"	Eros Ramazzotti	8
2004
12 January	"White Flag"	Dido	1
19 January	"In the Shadows"	The Rasmus	1
26 January	"Ha újra látom"	GrooveHouse	1
2 February	"In the Shadows"	The Rasmus	2
16 February	"Let The Sunshine In"	Milk & Sugar	3
8 March	"Look Through My Eyes"	Phil Collins	1
15 March	"Let The Sunshine In"	Milk & Sugar	1
22 March	"Amazing"	George Michael	7
10 May	"Summer Sunshine"	The Corrs	9
12 July	"Játszom"	Hooligans	1
19 July	"Summer Sunshine"	The Corrs	2
2 August	"Játszom"	Hooligans	5
6 September	"Még egyszer"	Club 54	1
13 September	"This Love"	Maroon 5	1
20 September	"Játszom"	Hooligans	1
27 September	"This Is the World We Live In"	Alcazar	6
8 November	"(Reach Up for The) Sunrise"	Duran Duran	1
15 November	"Open Road"	Bryan Adams	1
22 November	"(Reach Up for The) Sunrise"	Duran Duran	2
6 December	"Open Road"	Bryan Adams	1
13 December	"(Reach Up for The) Sunrise"	Duran Duran	9
2005
14 February	"Femme Like You"	K'Maro	8
11 April	"Shiver"	Natalie Imbruglia	6
23 May	"Lonely No More"	Rob Thomas	2
6 June	"Incomplete"	Backstreet Boys	2
20 June	"Lonely No More"	Rob Thomas	8
15 August	"If There's Any Justice"	Lemar	1
22 August	"La Tortura"	Shakira	8
17 October	"They"	Jem	3
7 November	"You're Beautiful"	James Blunt	1
14 November	"Hung Up"	Madonna	12
2006
6 February	"La Camisa Negra"	Juanes	2
20 February	"Hung Up"	Madonna	2
6 March	"La Camisa Negra"	Juanes	3
27 March	"I Belong to You (Il Ritmo della Passione)"	Eros Ramazzotti & Anastacia	1
3 April	"Sorry"	Madonna	4
1 May	"Stupid Girls"	Pink	1
8 May	"Hips Don't Lie"	Shakira	9
10 July	"Sin Sin Sin"	Robbie Williams	3
31 July	"A Dios le Pido"	Juanes	1
7 August	"Mas Que Nada"	Sérgio Mendes featuring The Black Eyed Peas	2
21 August	"Crazy"	Gnarls Barkley	1
28 August	"A Dios le Pido"	Juanes	1
4 September	"Mas Que Nada"	Sérgio Mendes featuring The Black Eyed Peas	1
11 September	"World, Hold On (Children of the Sky)"	Bob Sinclar featuring Steve Edwards	3
2 October	"Who Knew"	Pink	2
16 October	"World, Hold On (Children of the Sky)"	Bob Sinclar featuring Steve Edwards	1
23 October	"Who Knew"	Pink	4
20 November	"Unfaithful"	Rihanna	1
27 November	"Buttons"	The Pussycat Dolls featuring Snoop Dogg	3
18 December	"Jump"	Madonna	5
2007
22 January	"Irreplaceable"	Beyoncé	1
29 January	"Félember"	Hooligans	4
26 February	"Snow (Hey Oh)"	Red Hot Chili Peppers	1
5 March	"U + Ur Hand"	Pink	2
19 March	"Snow (Hey Oh)"	Red Hot Chili Peppers	1
26 March	"Hit Me Up"	Gia Farrell	2
9 April	"Say It Right"	Nelly Furtado	4
7 May	"All Good Things (Come to an End)"	Nelly Furtado	1
14 May	"Say It Right"	Nelly Furtado	1
21 May	"All Good Things (Come to an End)"	Nelly Furtado	2
4 June	"Beautiful Liar"	Beyoncé & Shakira	2
18 June	"All Good Things (Come to an End)"	Nelly Furtado	3
9 July	"Beautiful Liar"	Beyoncé & Shakira	1
16 July	"All Good Things (Come to an End)"	Nelly Furtado	1
23 July	"Beautiful Liar"	Beyoncé & Shakira	1
30 July	"Umbrella"	Rihanna featuring Jay-Z	2
13 August	"Give It to Me"	Timbaland featuring Nelly Furtado & Justin Timberlake	2
27 August	"Makes Me Wonder"	Maroon 5	1
3 September	"Give It to Me"	Timbaland featuring Nelly Furtado & Justin Timberlake	1
10 September	"Don't Matter"	Akon	1
17 September	"Give It to Me"	Timbaland featuring Nelly Furtado & Justin Timberlake	1
24 September	"Don't Matter"	Akon	1
1 October	"Love Is Gone"	David Guetta featuring Chris Willis	3
22 October	"Beautiful Girls"	Sean Kingston	3
12 November	"Don't Matter"	Akon	2
26 November	"Big Girls Don't Cry"	Fergie	1
3 December	"Rehab"	Amy Winehouse	1
10 December	"Beautiful Girls"	Sean Kingston	1
17 December	"Rehab"	Amy Winehouse	1
24 December	"The Way I Are"	Timbaland featuring Keri Hilson	2
2008
7 January	"About You Now"	The Sugababes	1
14 January	"The Way I Are"	Timbaland featuring Keri Hilson	1
21 January	"About You Now"	The Sugababes	1
28 January	"Into the Night"	Santana featuring Chad Kroeger	1
4 February	"Rehab"	Amy Winehouse	1
11 February	"The Way I Are"	Timbaland featuring Keri Hilson	1
18 February	"Don't Stop the Music"	Rihanna	3
10 March	"No One"	Alicia Keys	1
17 March	"The Way I Are"	Timbaland featuring Keri Hilson	1
24 March	"Don't Stop the Music"	Rihanna	1
31 March	"The Way I Are"	Timbaland featuring Keri Hilson	1
7 April	"Bleeding Love"	Leona Lewis	1
14 April	"Apologize"	Timbaland presents OneRepublic	3
5 May	"Bleeding Love"	Leona Lewis	4
2 June	"Apologize"	Timbaland presents OneRepublic	5
7 July	"4 Minutes"	Madonna featuring Justin Timberlake	1
14 July	"Apologize"	Timbaland presents OneRepublic	2
21 July	"4 Minutes"	Madonna featuring Justin Timberlake	3
18 August	"Apologize"	Timbaland presents OneRepublic	1
25 August	"Into the Night"	Santana featuring Chad Kroeger	1
1 September	"4 Minutes"	Madonna featuring Justin Timberlake	1
8 September	"Into the Night"	Santana featuring Chad Kroeger	1
15 September	"4 Minutes"	Madonna featuring Justin Timberlake	1
22 September	"Mercy"	Duffy	1
29 September	"Give It 2 Me"	Madonna	1
6 October	"Mercy"	Duffy	1
13 October	"Give It 2 Me"	Madonna	1
20 October	"Mercy"	Duffy	3
10 November	"I Kissed a Girl"	Katy Perry	12
2009
2 February	"Hot n Cold"	Katy Perry	15
18 May	"My Life Would Suck Without You"	Kelly Clarkson	2
1 June	"The Boy Does Nothing"	Alesha Dixon	1
8 June	"My Life Would Suck Without You"	Kelly Clarkson	3
29 June	"Hot n Cold"	Katy Perry	1
6 July	"My Life Would Suck Without You"	Kelly Clarkson	2
20 July	"Hot n Cold"	Katy Perry	1
27 July	"The Boy Does Nothing"	Alesha Dixon	1
3 August	"Hot n Cold"	Katy Perry	3
24 August	"The Boy Does Nothing"	Alesha Dixon	1
31 August	"Hot n Cold"	Katy Perry	1
7 September	"Cry Cry"	Oceana	2
21 September	"Waking Up in Vegas"	Katy Perry	2
5 October	"Cry Cry"	Oceana	1
12 October	"When Love Takes Over"	David Guetta featuring Kelly Rowland	5
16 November	"Celebration"	Madonna	1
23 November	"Hush Hush"	The Pussycat Dolls	4
21 December	"Bodies"	Robbie Williams	1
28 December	"Cry Cry"	Oceana	1
