= Happy Feet =

2006 animated film by George Miller

- Theatrical release poster
- Directed by: George Miller
- Written by: George Miller; John Collee; Judy Morris; Warren Coleman
- Produced by: Bill Miller; George Miller; Doug Mitchell
- Starring: Elijah Wood; Robin Williams; Brittany Murphy; Hugh Jackman; Nicole Kidman; Hugo Weaving; Anthony LaPaglia; Magda Szubanski; Steve Irwin
- Cinematography: David Peers
- Edited by: Christian Gazal; Margaret Sixel
- Music by: John Powell
- Production companies: Village Roadshow Pictures; Animal Logic; Kennedy Miller Productions; Kingdom Feature Productions
- Distributed by: Warner Bros. Pictures (Worldwide); Roadshow Films (Australia/New Zealand)
- Release dates: 17 November 2006 (United States); 26 December 2006 (Australia)
- Running time: 108 minutes
- Countries: United States; Australia
- Language: English
- Budget: $100 million
- Box office: $384.3 million

Happy Feet is a 2006 animated jukebox musical comedy film directed and produced by George Miller and written by Miller, John Collee, Judy Morris and Warren Coleman. It stars Elijah Wood, Robin Williams, Brittany Murphy, Hugh Jackman, Nicole Kidman, Hugo Weaving, Anthony LaPaglia, Magda Szubanski and Steve Irwin. In the film, Mumble (Wood), a tap-dancing emperor penguin who cannot sing a heartsong to attract a soulmate and is ridiculed by his peers and family, departs on a journey across Antarctica to learn what is causing the local fish population to decline.

Happy Feet was the first animated film produced by Kennedy Miller and Animal Logic. An international co-production between the United States and Australia, the film was produced at Sydney-based visual effects and animation studio Animal Logic. The film was released in North America on 17 November 2006 and in Australia on 26 December. A planned IMAX 3D release was cancelled due to budgetary issues.

Happy Feet received generally positive reviews from critics, with praise for its visuals, storyline and songs, and grossed $384 million against its $100 million budget, becoming the tenth-highest-grossing film of 2006. It earned the inaugural BAFTA Award for Best Animated Film, and the Academy Award for Best Animated Feature, and was nominated for the Annie Award and the Saturn Award for Best Animated Feature. A sequel, Happy Feet Two, was released in 2011. A stage musical is in development.

== Plot ==
Every emperor penguin attracts a mate by singing a unique "heartsong". If the male penguin's heartsong matches the female's song, the two penguins mate. Norma Jean, a female penguin, falls for Memphis, a male penguin and they become mates. They lay an egg, which Memphis cares for while Norma Jean leaves with the other females to fish. While the males struggle through the harsh winter, Memphis briefly drops the egg. The resulting chick, Mumble, is unable to sing but is nevertheless enamored with Gloria, a female penguin who is regarded as the most talented of her age. One day, Mumble discovers he is able to tap dance before encountering a group of hostile skua, with a leader who is tagged with a yellow band, which he says is from an alien abduction. Mumble narrowly escapes the hungry birds by falling into a crevice.

Now a young adult, Mumble is frequently ridiculed by the elders and their leader Noah. After escaping from a leopard seal attack, Mumble befriends five Adelie penguins named Ramón, Nestor, Lombardo, Rinaldo and Raul, known collectively as "the Amigos", who embrace Mumble's dance moves and assimilate him into their group. After seeing a hidden human excavator in an avalanche, they opt to ask Lovelace, a rockhopper penguin, about its origin. Lovelace has the plastic rings of a six pack entangled around his neck, saying that they have been bestowed upon him by mystic beings.

For the emperor penguins, it is mating season and Gloria is the center of attention. The Amigos unsuccessfully attempt to help Mumble win her affection by having Ramón sing a Spanish version of "My Way" behind Mumble, with the latter lip syncing. After Mumble desperately begins tap dancing in sync with her song, she falls for him and the youthful penguins join in for singing and dancing to "Boogie Wonderland". The elders are appalled by Mumble's conduct, which they see as the reason for their lean fishing season. Memphis begs Mumble to stop dancing, for his own sake, but when Mumble refuses, he is exiled.

Mumble and the Amigos return to Lovelace, only to find him being choked by the plastic rings. Lovelace confesses they were snagged on him while swimming off the forbidden shores, beyond the land of the elephant seals. Not long into their journey, Gloria encounters them, wishing to become Mumble's mate. Fearing for her safety, he ridicules Gloria, driving her away.

At the forbidden shore, Mumble, Lovelace, and the Amigos are attacked by two orcas, during which Lovelace is freed from the plastic rings. After escaping, they find a fishing boat and climb atop a tall iceberg. In the distance, they see several more boats, the cause of their fish scarcity. Mumble jumps into the water and exhaustingly pursues them alone, eventually washing up on a beach. He is rescued and brought to Marine World, a fictional zoo in Miami, in an exhibit with Magellanic and chinstrap penguins. After a long and secluded confinement unsuccessfully attempting to communicate with humans visiting the exhibit, he is about to succumb to madness when he unexpectedly reveals his dancing skills to the humans, who are all amazed. He is released back into the wild with a tracking device attached to his back. He returns to his colony and challenges the will of the elders. Memphis reconciles with him just as a research team arrives, verifying Mumble's statements of "aliens" existing. The entire colony engages in dance in front of the research team, whose expedition footage prompts a worldwide debate which eventually results in a ban on all Antarctic overfishing, satisfying both the emperor penguins and the Amigos.

== Voice cast ==
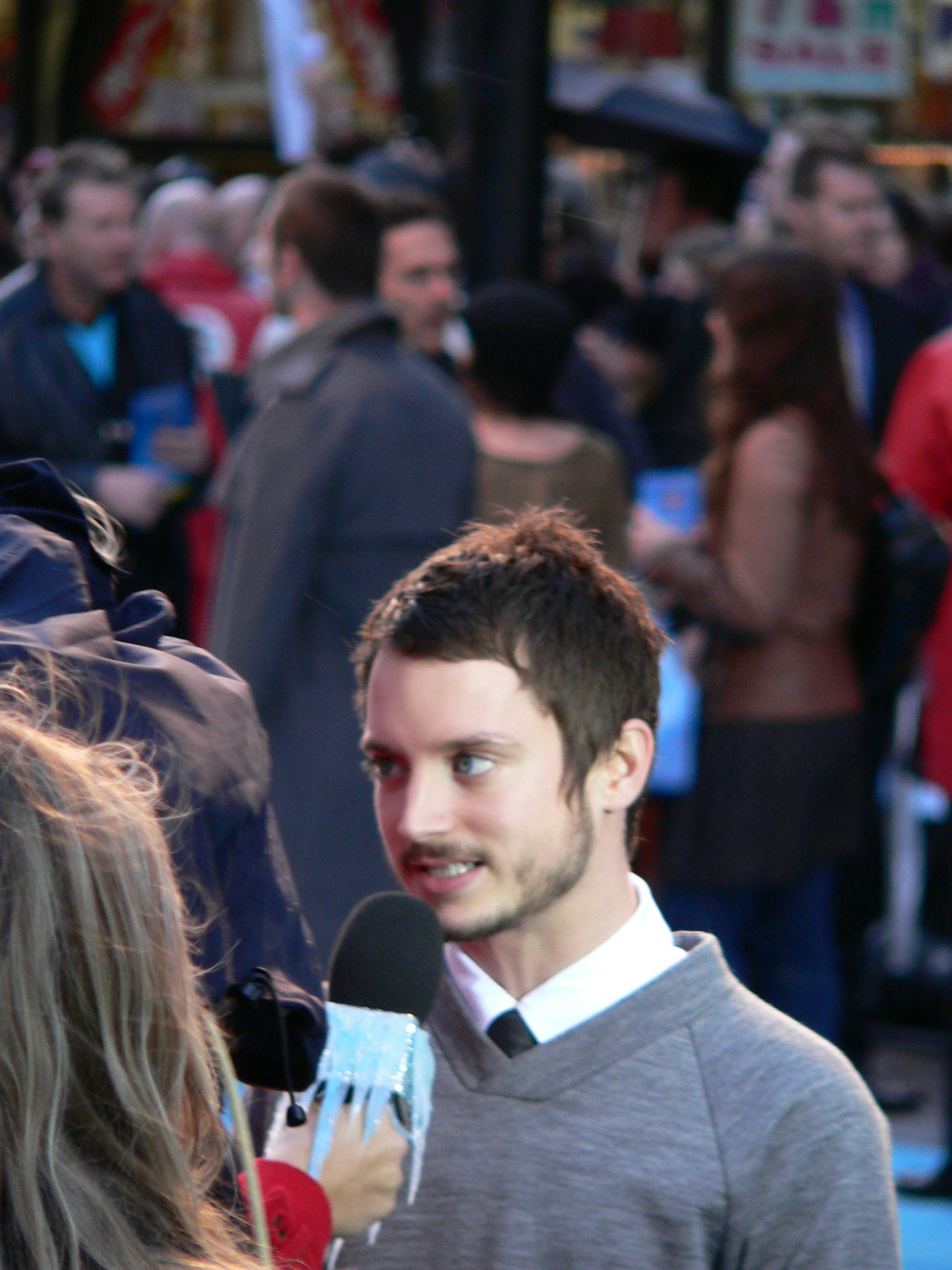
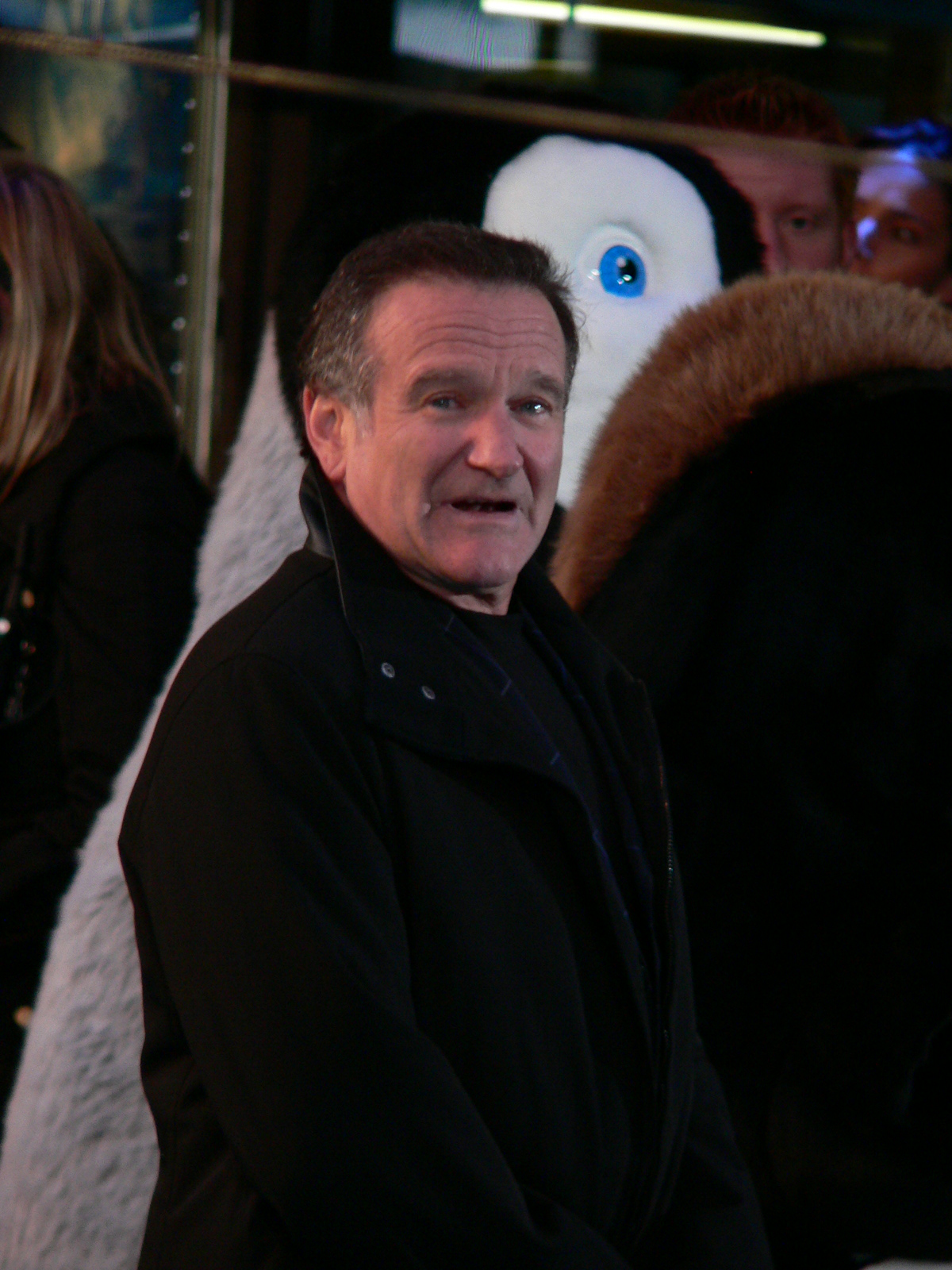
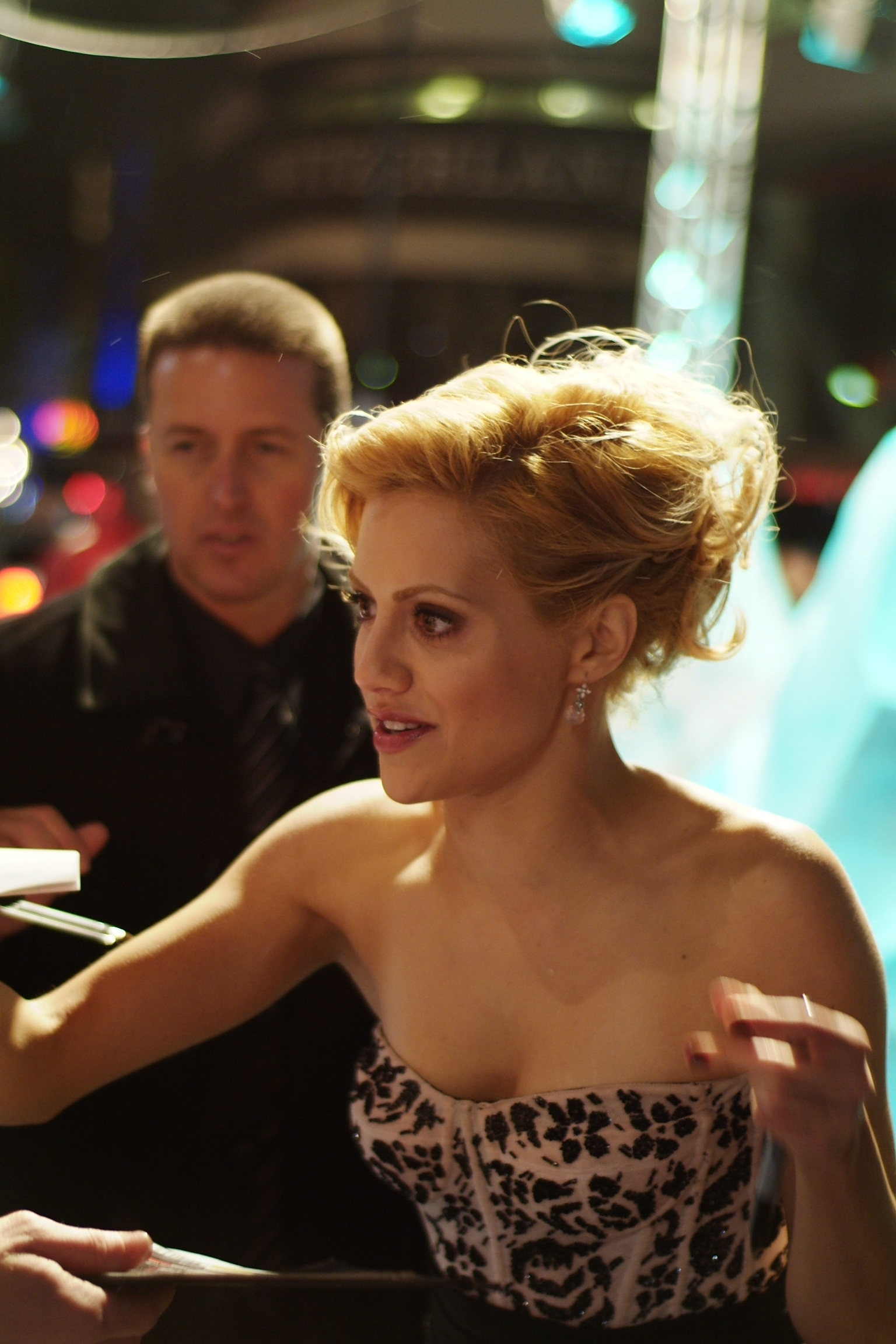
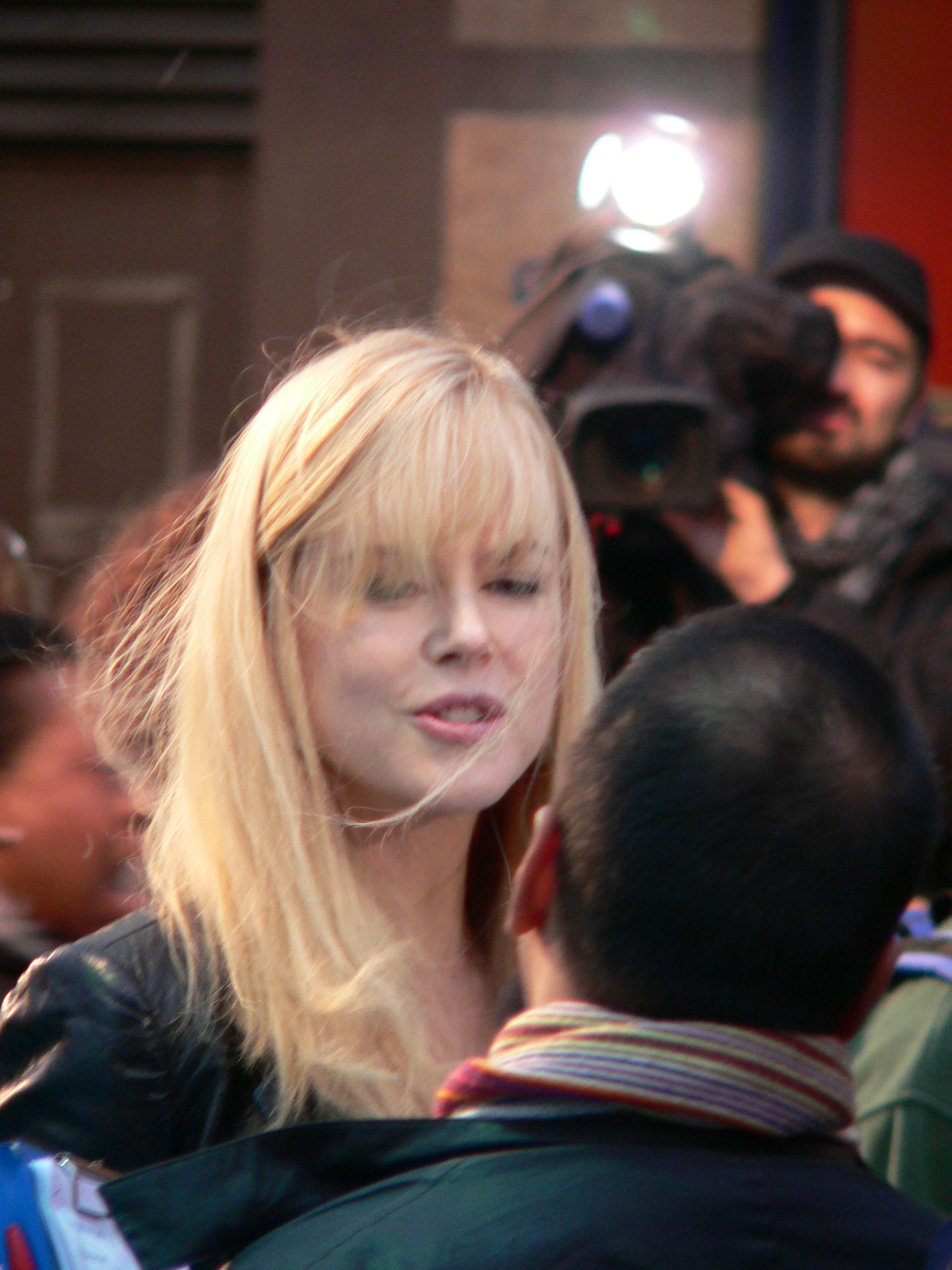
Elijah Wood, Robin Williams, Brittany Murphy and Nicole Kidman at the film's European premiere in London, UK.
- Elijah Wood as Mumble, a premature Emperor penguin who has a talent of tap-dancing but is unable to sing after his father's accident by drop, resulting to his freezing temperature in the midst of harsh winter.
  - E. G. Daily as baby Mumble.
- Robin Williams as:
  - Ramón, an Adélie penguin and leader of "the Amigos" who befriended Mumble.
  - Lovelace, a Northern rockhopper penguin who tells his origins to Mumble and the Amigos about the "alien abduction".
  - Cletus.
  - The narrator in the film.
- Brittany Murphy as Gloria, Mumble's love interest.
  - Alyssa Shafer as baby Gloria
- Hugh Jackman as Memphis, Mumble's father and Norma Jean's mate. Memphis is named after Elvis Presley's hometown and is inspired by Presley himself.
- Nicole Kidman as Norma Jean, Mumble's mother and Memphis's mate. Norma Jean is named after Marilyn Monroe's birthname and is inspired by Monroe herself.
- Hugo Weaving as Noah the Elder, who opposes Mumble for his appearance.
- Fat Joe as Seymour, Mumble's friend
  - Cesar Flores as baby Seymour
- Anthony LaPaglia as Skua Boss, a skua who targets young penguins to eat it alive.
- Magda Szubanski as Miss Viola, Mumble's teacher
- Miriam Margolyes as Mrs. Astrakhan
- Steve Irwin as Trev
- Carlos Alazraqui as Nestor
- Lombardo Boyar as Raul
- Jeffrey Garcia as Rinaldo
- Johnny Sanchez as Lombardo
- Richard Carter as Barry
- Roger Rose as Leopard Seal
- Lee Perry as Elder and Zoo Penguin
- Dee Bradley Baker as Maurice
- Chrissie Hynde as Michelle

== Production ==
=== Inspirations ===
As an initial inspiration for the film, George Miller cited an encounter with cinematographer Bill Grimmond during the shooting of The Road Warrior (Mad Max II). Grimmond had shot a documentary in Antarctica, and said that Miller should make a film set there, he compared to the "wasteland" desert they were filming in.

Miller was also influenced by Frank Hurley, official photographer of the Australasian Antarctic Expedition (AAE, 1911–1913) and BANZARE (1929–31) expeditions led by Australian geologist Douglas Mawson, as well as the Imperial Trans-Antarctic Expedition of 1914–1917 led by Ernest Shackleton. Hurley's footage of the AAE, assembled in various forms and later known as Home of the Blizzard, which included footage of penguins leaning against the wind, inspired some of the scenes in Happy Feet.

Happy Feet was also partially inspired by documentaries such as the BBC's Life in the Freezer (1993, presented by David Attenborough).

=== Pre-production ===
In 2001, during an otherwise unrelated meeting, Doug Mitchell impulsively presented Warner Bros. studio president Alan Horn with an early rough draft of the film's screenplay, and asked them to read it while he and Miller flew back to Australia. By the time they had landed, Warner Bros. had decided to provide funding on the film. Production was slated to begin sometime after the completion of the fourth Mad Max film Fury Road, but geopolitical complications pushed Happy Feet to the forefront in early 2003.

According to Miller, the environmental message was not a major part of the original script. "In Australia, we're very, very aware of the ozone hole... and Antarctica is literally the canary in the coal mine for this stuff. So it sort of had to go in that direction". This influence led to a film with a more environmental tone. Miller said, "You can't tell a story about Antarctica and the penguins without giving that dimension".

=== Technology ===
The animation is invested heavily in motion capture technology, with the dance scenes acted by human dancers. The tap dancing for Mumble was provided by Savion Glover, who was also co-choreographer for the dance sequences. The dancers went through "Penguin School" to learn how to move like a penguin, and also wore head apparatus to mimic a penguin's beak.

Happy Feet needed an enormous group of computers, and Animal Logic worked with IBM to build a server farm with sufficient processing potential. The film took four years to make. Lighting Supervisor and VFX Department Supervisor Ben Gunsberger said that this was partly because they needed to build new infrastructure and tools. The server farm used IBM BladeCenter framework and BladeCenter HS20 blade servers, which are extremely dense separate computer units, each with two Intel Xeon processors. Rendering took up 17 million CPU hours over a nine-month period.

=== Music ===
Happy Feet is a jukebox musical, taking previously recorded songs and working them into the film's soundtrack to fit the mood of the scene or character. Two soundtrack albums were released for the film; one containing songs from and inspired by the film, and another featuring John Powell's instrumental score. They were released on 31 October 2006 and 19 December 2006, respectively.

Prince's "Song of the Heart" won the Golden Globe Award for Best Original Song. The film won Golden Trailer Award for Best Music. The song was written by Prince specifically for Happy Feet shortly after he was given a private screening of the film to gain his approval for the use of his song "Kiss" in a musical number. Prince enjoyed the film, gave his approval for the use of "Kiss" and offered to write an original song for the production, which he completed a week later.

==== Soundtrack ====
Happy Feet: Music from the Motion Picture

Soundtrack album by Various Artists
- Released: 31 October 2006
- Genres: Soundtrack; pop; rock; R&B; hip hop
- Length: 47:47
- Labels: Warner Sunset; Atlantic
- Producers: John Powell; George Miller

Singles from Happy Feet
- 1. "Hit Me Up" Released: 22 January 2007

Happy Feet: Music from the Motion Picture is the lyrical soundtrack album from the 2006 animated film Happy Feet. As of March 2007, the original soundtrack sold more than 272,627 copies in the US.

Happy Feet: Music from the Motion Picture
No.	Title	Writer(s)	Performer(s)	Length
1.	"The Song of the Heart"	Prince	Prince	4:35
2.	"Hit Me Up"	Brian Kierulf, Josh Schwartz & Gia Farrell	Gia Farrell	3:16
3.	"Tell Me Something Good"	Stevie Wonder	Pink	3:08
4.	"Somebody to Love"	Freddie Mercury	Brittany Murphy	3:47
5.	"I Wish"	Stevie Wonder	Patti LaBelle, Yolanda Adams and Fantasia Barrino	3:31
6.	"Jump N' Move"	Simon Bartholomew, Jan Kincaid, Andrew Levy & Jamal Mitchell	The Brand New Heavies (featuring Jamalski)	3:18
7.	"Do It Again"	Brian Wilson & Mike Love	The Beach Boys	2:24
8.	"The Joker mash-up with Everything I Own"	"The Joker" by Steve Miller, Eddie Curtis & Ahmet Ertegün; "Everything I Own" by David Gates	"The Joker" by Jason Mraz; "Everything I Own" by Chrissie Hynde	4:05
9.	"My Way (A Mi Manera)"	Paul Anka, Jacques Revaux, Claude François & Gilles Thibault	Robin Williams	1:44
10.	"Kiss mash-up with Heartbreak Hotel"	"Kiss" by Prince; "Heartbreak Hotel" by Mae Boren Axton, Thomas Durden, and Elvis Presley	"Kiss" by Nicole Kidman; "Heartbreak Hotel" by Hugh Jackman	2:36
11.	"Boogie Wonderland"	Allee Willis & Jonathan Lind	Brittany Murphy	5:07
12.	"Golden Slumbers / The End"	John Lennon & Paul McCartney	k.d. lang	4:16
13.	"The Story of Mumble Happy Feet"	John Powell		5:50
Total length:				47:37

=== Certifications ===
Region	Certification	Certified units/sales
Australia (ARIA)	Gold	35,000^{^}
New Zealand (RMNZ)	Gold	7,500^{^}
^{^} Shipments figures based on certification alone.

== Reception ==
=== Box office ===
The film opened at number one in the United States on its first weekend of release (17–19 November), grossing $41.6 million and beating Casino Royale for the top spot. It remained number one for the Thanksgiving weekend, making $51.6 million over the five-day period, while also outgrossing newcomers Déjà Vu and Deck the Halls. In total, the film was the top grosser for three weeks, a 2006 box-office feat matched by only Pirates of the Caribbean: Dead Man's Chest. As of 8 June 2008, Happy Feet had grossed $198.0 million in the US and Canada, and $186.3 million in other countries, making approximately $384.3 million worldwide. Happy Feet was the third-highest-grossing animated film of 2006 in the US, behind Cars and Ice Age: The Meltdown. The film was released in an estimated 35 territories at the close of 2006.

The production budget was $100 million.

=== Critical reception ===
Happy Feet received generally positive reviews from critics. On review aggregator site Rotten Tomatoes, the film holds a 76% approval rating, based on 170 reviews, with an average rating of 6.9/10. The site's consensus reads: "Visually dazzling, with a thoughtful storyline and catchy musical numbers, Happy Feet marks a successful animated debut from the makers of Babe." Metacritic reports a 77 out of 100 rating, based on 30 critics. Audiences polled by CinemaScore gave the film an average grade of "A−" on a scale of A+ to F.

Marjorie Baumgarten, film critic for The Austin Chronicle, wrote a positive review, saying, "Happy Feet treads material common to kids films and cartoons, most notably Dumbo: A young animal stands out from his herd or flock because of his inability to perform like the other animals, although he seemingly compensates for this defect by demonstrating a certain skill that sets him apart from the others, who ostracize him for his weirdness." Baumgarten also said that the CGI recreation of Antarctica is "stunning, allowing the film to shift among glorious long shots of the ice and penguin population and midshots and close-ups of the character interactions".

James Berardinelli, film critic for ReelViews, praised its musical numbers (particularly "Kiss" and "Boogie Wonderland") and Robin Williams's performance by awarding the film three out of four, saying, "The ingredients for greatness are there. It's too bad the movie lost its way on the approach to the finish line. I recommend Happy Feet, but not as enthusiastically as I wish I could."

=== Analysis ===
Film critic Yar Habnegnal wrote an essay in Forum on Contemporary Art and Society that examines the themes of encroachment presented throughout the film, as well as various other subtexts and themes, such as religious hierarchy and interracial tensions. Vadim Rizov of IFC sees Mumble as just the latest in a long line of cinematic religious mavericks. Some Christians have also considered the film to be anti-Christian (or antireligious in general) due to the imagery and behaviours of various characters.

On a technical or formal level, the film has also been recognised for its innovative introduction of Miller's roving style of subjective cinematography into contemporary animation.

=== Home media ===
Happy Feet was released on home media on 27 March 2007, in the United States in three formats: DVD (in separate widescreen and pan-and-scan editions), Blu-ray, and an HD DVD/DVD combo pack. Overall, Happy Feet was the third-best-selling film of 2007, with 12.2 million units sold, earning a revenue of $196.9 million.

Among the DVD's special features is a scene that was cut from the film, in which Mumble meets a blue whale and an albatross while pursuing the fishing boat. The albatross was Steve Irwin's first voice role in the film before he voiced the elephant seal in the final cut. The scene was finished and included on the DVD in Irwin's memory. This scene is done in documentary style, with the albatross describing the other characters in the scene, and the impact people are having on their environment. Another special feature included on the DVD is the 1936 Merrie Melodies short I Love to Singa.

== Accolades ==
The film appeared on numerous critics' top-ten lists of the best films of 2006.

Award	Category	Winner/Nominee	Result
Academy Awards	Best Animated Feature	George Miller	Won
American Film Institute Awards	Honored as one of the Top Ten Best Films of the Year		Won
Annie Awards	Best Animated Feature	George Miller	Nominated
Annie Awards	Best Writing in an Animated Feature Production	George Miller, John Collee, Judy Morris, and Warren Coleman	Nominated
British Academy Children's Awards	Best Feature Film		Won
British Academy Film Awards	Best Animated Feature Film		Won
Golden Globe Awards	Best Animated Feature Film		Nominated
Golden Globe Awards	Best Original Song	"Song of the Heart" by Prince	Won
Golden Trailer Awards	Best Music		Won
Grammy Awards	Best Score Soundtrack Album for Motion Picture, Television or Other Visual Media	John Powell	Nominated
Grammy Awards	Best Song Written for Motion Picture, Television or Other Visual Media	"The Song of the Heart", Prince	Nominated
Kids' Choice Awards	Favorite Animated Movie		Won
Los Angeles Film Critics Association Awards	Best Animation		Won
New York Film Critics Circle Awards	Best Animated Film		Won
Satellite Awards	Best Motion Picture, Animated or Mixed Media		Nominated
Saturn Awards	Best Animated Film		Nominated

== Video games ==
A video game based on the film was developed by A2M and published by Midway Games. It has the same main cast as the film. It was released for Microsoft Windows, PlayStation 2, GameCube, Game Boy Advance, Nintendo DS and Wii.

Artificial Life, Inc. has also developed a mobile game for the Japanese market.

== Sequel ==
Happy Feet Two was produced at Dr. D Studios and released on 18 November 2011.

=== 4-D attraction ===
Happy Feet 4-D Experience is a 12-minute 4D film shown at various 4D theatres around the world. It retells the condensed story of Happy Feet with the help of 3D projection and sensory effects, including moving seats, wind, mist and scents. Produced by SimEx-Iwerks, the 4D experience premiered in March 2010 at the Drayton Manor Theme Park. Other locations included Sea World (2010–2011), Shedd Aquarium (2010–2012), Moody Gardens (2010–2011), Nickelodeon Suites Resort and Adventure Aquarium.

== See also ==
- March of the Penguins — A 2005 nature documentary film about the real life emperor penguins. It won the 2005 Academy Award for Best Documentary Feature.
