= Zsolt Hauber =

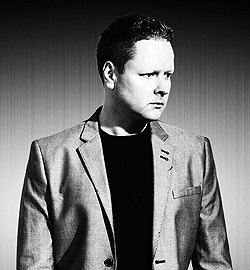
Zsolt Hauber

Zsolt Hauber (Kecskemét, 11 December 1968) is a Hungarian electronic musician and music producer. His songs have been used in commercials and television programs.

== Background ==
He studied piano for 7 years and he spent his childhood in Budapest, Szolnok and Moscow. When he was 14 years old, he was in the musical band Bonanza Banzai with Ákos Kovács and Gábor Menczel, and has taken part in other musical projects like Fresh.
