= A döntőkben elhangzott dalok =

Studio album by Magdolna Rúzsa
- Released: June 6, 2006
- Recorded: 2006
- Genre: Pop
- Label: Universal

Magdolna Rúzsa chronology
| A döntőkben elhangzott dalok (2006) | Ördögi angyal (2006) |

A döntőkben elhangzott dalok is the debut studio album by Hungarian singer Magdolna Rúzsa. The translated title reads Song Performances in the Finals. This album contains her live performances on the TV show Megasztár. It was certified three times platinum in Hungary with more than 70,000 copies sold.

== Track listing ==
| No. | Title | Original Performer | Length |
|---|---|---|---|
| 1. | "Meghalok, hogy ha rám nézel" | Hungária |
| 2. | "Got My Mind Set on You" | George Harrison |
| 3. | "The Winner Takes It All" | ABBA |
| 4. | "Végső vallomás" | United |
| 5. | "I Want To Break Free" | Queen |
| 6. | "Time Warp" | Rocky Horror Picture Show |
| 7. | "Piece Of My Heart" (feat. Dániel Torres) | Janis Joplin |
| 8. | "When a Man Loves a Woman" | Percy Sledge |
| 9. | "Ederlezi" | Goran Bregovic |
| 10. | "Fado Marujo" | Amália Rodrigues |
| 11. | "La Bamba" | Los Lobos |
| 12. | "One Love" | Bob Marley |
| 13. | "Cry Baby" | Janis Joplin |
| 14. | "Bring on the Night" | The Police |
| 15. | "Road Runner" | Aerosmith |
| 16. | "May It Be" | Enya |
| 17. | "Most élsz" | Máté Péter |
| 18. | "It Takes Two" (feat. Ferenc Varga (singer)) | Tina Turner & Rod Stewart |
