= Magdi Rúzsa =

Hungarian singer (born 1985)

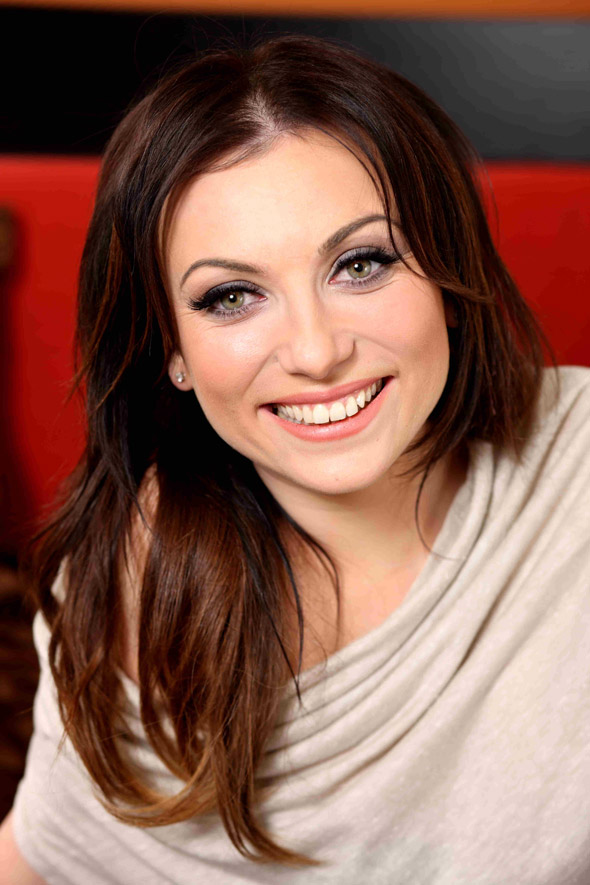
- Rúzsa in 2012

Background information
- Born: Magdolna Rúzsa; 28 November 1985 (age 40); Titov Vrbas, SR Serbia, SFR Yugoslavia
- Origin: Hungary
- Genres: Pop; rock
- Occupations: Singer; songwriter
- Instrument: Vocals
- Years active: 2005–present
- Labels: CLS; Magneoton
- Website: ruzsamagdi.hu

Magdolna "Magdi" Rúzsa (Hungarian pronunciation: [ˈmɒɡdolnɒ ˈruːʒɒ]; Serbian: Магдолна Ружа, romanized: Magdolna Ruža; born 28 November 1985) is a Serbian-born Kossuth Prize-winning musician, television personality, singer, songwriter and music coach who won the 2006 title of Megasztár ("Megastar"), Hungary's nationwide talent search, that resembles, but is not based on, Pop Idol. As the winner of the category "Newcomer of the Year" at the Fonogram Hungarian Music Awards in 2007, she represented Hungary in the Eurovision Song Contest 2007 with the song "Unsubstantial Blues". She finished ninth and won a Marcel Bezençon Award in the Best Composer category. She often performs songs by her favorite singer, Janis Joplin.

== Biography ==
Born in Vrbas into the Hungarian ethnic minority in Serbia, Rúzsa studied in Subotica as an obstetric nurse. She was discovered in 2005, after winning the third season of Megasztár (Megastar) in Hungary.

After winning the competition, Rúzsa's album, featuring the songs she performed during the show's finals, went triple platinum and to date has sold around 80,000 copies. Her first artist album Ördögi Angyal (Devilish Angel) was released on her birthday (28 November 2006) and has sold 36,000 copies so far. These two records were the biggest-selling releases in 2006 in Hungary.

Rúzsa was voted New Talent of the Year in 2006, representing Hungary at the Eurovision Song Contest 2007. She decided to sing in English because she felt that the lyrics of the song are of high importance and wanted people to understand what Unsubstantial Blues was all about. The semi-finals took place on 10 May 2007 and Rúzsa made her way to the finals in second place with 224 points. At the final on 12 May 2007 she finished ninth with 128 points. Being the songwriter of Unsubstantial Blues, she was also granted the Best Composer Award, which is given to the best songwriter among the Eurovision song composers every year.

On February 1, 2022, Rúzsa gave birth to her children Lujza, Keve and Zalán.

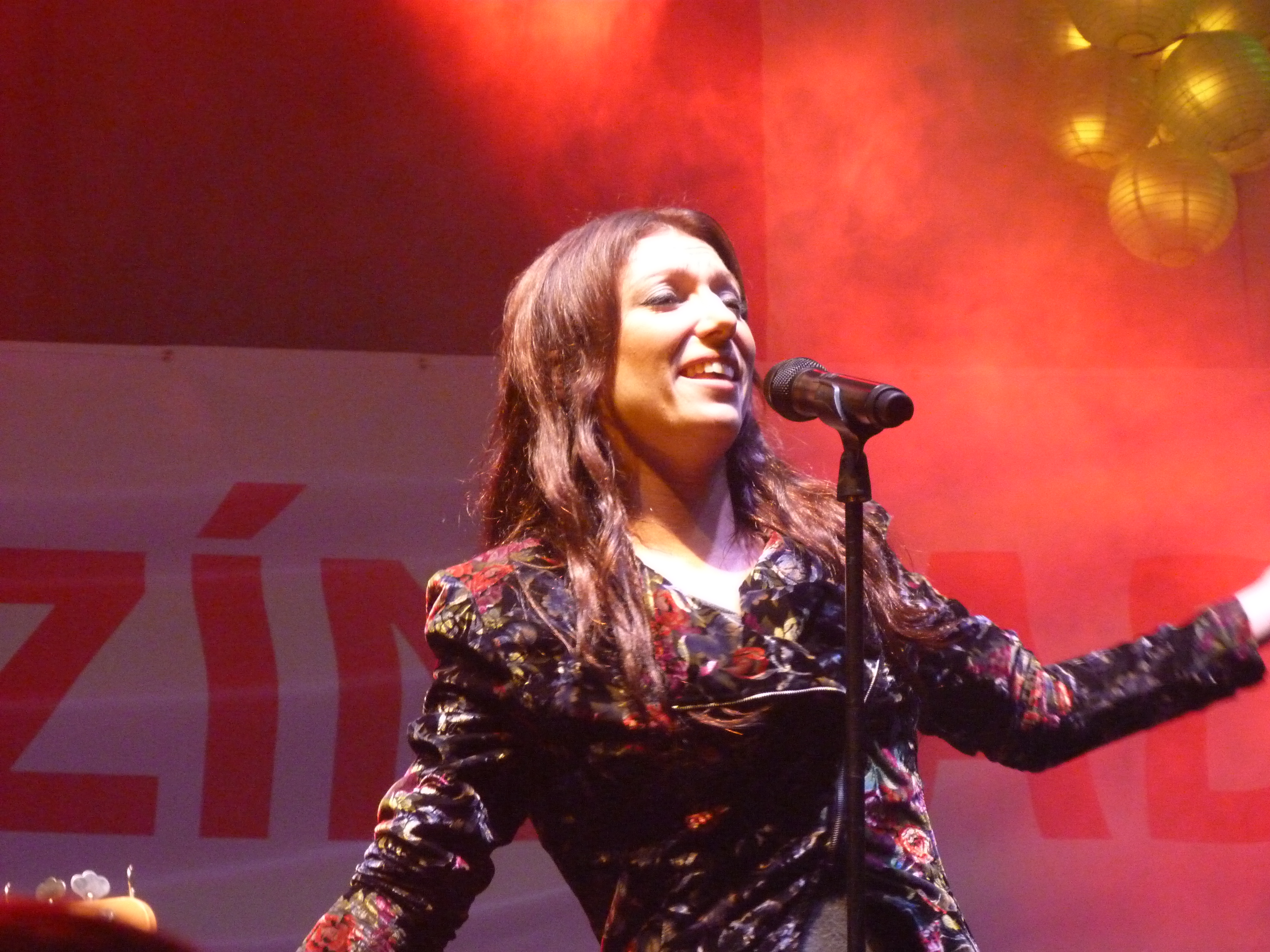
Magdi Rúzsa - Royal Castle, Budapest, 2014

== 2005/2006 Megasztár ==
Song performances by Rúzsa on Megasztár:

- Original Audition: "Highway to Hell" (AC/DC) and "Aprócska Blues" (Magdolna Rúzsa)
- Top 50: "Highway to Hell" (AC/DC) (semi-final)
- Top 12: "Meghalok, hogyha rám nézel" (Hungária) (Hungária week)
- Top 11: "Got My Mind Set on You" (George Harrison) (1980s week)
- Top 10: "The Winner Takes It All" (ABBA) (ABBA & Boney M week)
- Top 9: "Végső Vallomás" (United) (Hungarian week)
- Top 8: "I Want to Break Free" (Queen) (Queen week)
- Top 7: "Time Warp" (from The Rocky Horror Picture Show) (Musical week)
- Top 6: "Vetkőzés" (with Ferenc Varga (singer)), (Barna Pély) (Duets week)
- Top 6: "Piece of My Heart" (with Dániel Torres), (Janis Joplin) (Duets week)
- Top 5: "When a Man Loves a Woman" (Percy Sledge) (Soundtrack week)
- Top 5: "Ederlezi" (Goran Bregovic) (Soundtrack week)
- Top 4: "O Fado De Ser Fadista" (Amália Rodrigues) (Latin week)
- Top 4: "La Bamba" (Ritchie Valens) (Latin week)
- Top 3: "One Love" (Bob Marley) (Personal favourite week)
- Top 3: "Bring On the Night" (The Police) (Personal favourite week)
- Top 3: "Cry Baby" (Janis Joplin) (Personal favourite week)
- Top 2: "Road Runner" (Aerosmith) (Finale week) (winner)
- Top 2: "Fegyverem az adrenalin" (Dániel Torres) (Finale week) (winner)
- Top 2: "May It Be" (Enya) (Finale week) (winner)
- Top 2: "Most élsz" (Péter Máté) (Finale week) (winner)

Finale: "The Winner Takes It All" (ABBA) (Crowned to be the Voice of 2006)

== Discography ==
All figures and chart positions are given for Hungary if not stated otherwise.

Album information
A döntőkben elhangzott dalok
- Released: 6 June 2006
- Chart position: 1
- Certification: 3× Platinum
- Sales: 70.000+
- Official singles:
  - Most élsz (2)
Ördögi angyal (Devilish Angel)
- Released: 20 November 2006
- Chart position: 1
- Certification: 2× Platinum
- Sales: 36.000+
- Official singles:
  - Aprócska blues (9 HUN, 59 SWE)
  - Hip-Hop (6)
  - Vigyázz a madárra (9)
Kapcsolat Koncert
- Released: 1 November 2007
- Chart position: 7
- Certification: Platinum
- Sales: 15.000+
- Official singles:
  - Vigyázz a madárra (9)
Iránytű (Compass)
- Released: 5 November 2008
- Chart position: 2
- Certification: Gold
- Sales: 7.500+
- Official singles:
  - Rövid utazás
Magdaléna Rúzsa
- Released: 28 November 2011
- Chart position: 2
- Certification: 2× Platinum
- Sales: 8.000+
- Official singles:
  - Gábriel (10)
Tizenegy (Eleven)
- Released: 11 November 2012
- Chart position: 1
- Certification: 2× Platinum
- Sales: 8.000+
- Official singles:
  - Tárd ki a szíved (33)
  - Csak a bolond remél
  - Ná-ná-ná (30)
Dalok húrokra és fúvósokra
- Released: 28 November 2014
- Chart position: 3
- Certification: 1× Gold
- Sales: 2.000+
Dalok húrokra és fúvósokra
- Released: 28 November 2014
- Chart position: 3
- Certification: 1× Gold
- Sales: 2.000+
Aduász
- Released: 9 December 2018
- Chart position: 1

== See also ==
- Hungarian pop

Awards and achievements
| Preceded by Nox with "Forogj, világ!" | Hungary in the Eurovision Song Contest; 2007 | Succeeded by Csézy with "Candlelight" |
