= Gia Farrell =

American singer-songwriter (born 1989)

- Also known as: Gia Farrell, Bokeeks
- Born: Jeannie Bocchicchio; February 9, 1989 (age 37)
- Origin: Suffern, New York, U.S.
- Genres: R&B, Pop, Holiday, Classic, Rock, Alternative
- Occupations: Singer, songwriter
- Years active: 1997–present
- Labels: Atlantic Records (2005–2007); New Gold Empire (2014–present)
- Website: instagram.com/jeannienotgia

Gia Farrell (born Jeannie Bocchicchio, February 9, 1989) is an American singer-songwriter and make-up artist. Her 2006 single "Hit Me Up" was featured on the Happy Feet soundtrack in 2006 and climbed the charts internationally. In 2015, she released a single under the artist name "Bokeeks" titled "Smile". She's currently working on her first commercial album after leaving Atlantic Records in 2008.

== Early life ==
Gia was born in Suffern, New York to Italian-American parents. She began singing lessons at the age of eight. She continued to train her voice, and appeared in a local production of Guys and Dolls and opened for Fat Joe, where she performed songs from Beyoncé and Mariah Carey.

At age 13, she had performed on Showtime at the Apollo being named one of their "Best Artists of the Year" as well as on Ed McMahon's Next Big Star and Star Search. In 2005 at 16 years old she signed with Atlantic Records. She later adopted her grandmother's maiden name as her stage name. Farrell cites artists Whitney Houston, Mariah Carey and Christina Aguilera as her biggest influences.

== 2005–2007 ==
Farrell released her first single, "Hit Me Up", in January 2007. The song was featured on the soundtrack of the movie Happy Feet. It found moderate success internationally charting in various parts of Europe, topping the charts in Hungary and peaking at No. 6 in Australia. The single was used as the theme song for the second season of Germany's Next Topmodel. For the 2006 holiday season, Farrell's song "Christmas Everyday" was released on the Make-A-Wish Holiday CD sold at Bath & Body Works. In 2007 she recorded three songs "You'll be Sorry", "Can & Cannot Do" and "Stupid For You", however none were officially released as part of a CD or album. This was due to Gia Farrell leaving her label Atlantic Records because they did not release her album due to a change in internal staff and management. During this time in her early career, Gia had several managers and handlers including Doug Davis son of the legendary Clive Davis. After parting ways with Doug, Gia was forced to find new management. Gia's new manager was an unscrupulous individual who attempted to derail her career, steal her money and keep her in the dark. Unfortunately, he was successful at straining her relationship with her label. After a lengthy court battle and tens of thousands of dollars in legal fees, Gia won a court case against her manager and permanently parted ways with him. In April 2007 Farrell rode on the float for the opening parade celebration at the Cincinnati Reds opening day baseball game and sang the US National Anthem. In December 2008 Farrell left Atlantic Records.

== 2009–2011 ==
In May 2009 she released a demo single "New Religion" which was accompanied with a music video. Gia began posting random YouTube videos of original and cover songs. As of 2011 her videos had reached 600,000+ views. In January 2011, Farrell joined Miranda Cosgrove on her tour to promote her debut album, Sparks Fly. In mid June 2011, Farrell joined in a cover for Adele's "Rolling in the Deep" with The All Ways band. She also appeared on the eleventh season of American Idol as Jeannie Bocchicchio but was unable to complete the season due to having been previously signed to Atlantic records.

== Discography ==
Note: Only six songs from her "Gia Farrell" album leaked on the internet. Christmas Everyday and Hit Me Up had already released commercially for purchase online.

=== From the unreleased "Gia Farrell" album ===
- Christmas Everyday – 2006
- You'll Be Sorry – 2006
- Got Me Like Oh! song originally by Sertab Erener – 2006
- Hit Me Up from Happy Feet, 2007 CONCACAF Gold Cup and Germany's Next Topmodel season 2 – 2007
- Stupid For You – 2007
- Obvious – 2007
- I Been Hopin' – 2007
- Can & Cannot Do – 2007
- Next – 2007
- Real – 2007
- So Wrong – 2007
- Do You Know What It's Like? – 2007
- I Was Ready – 2007
- Girl Like Me – 2007
- Flashback – 2007
- Don't Make Me Break Your Heart – 2007
- Over You – 2007
- Outta My Mind – 2007
- Let's Go – 2007
- Wait and See – 2007

=== Other sample songs ===
- New Religion – 2009
- Oh Holy Night – 2009
- The Christmas Song – 2009

=== With Blackbird ===
- Can't Make Somebody Love You – 2014
- Goodbye – 2014

=== As Bokeeks ===
- Smile (2015)
- Christmas Love (2015)

=== 2017–18 ===
- Original Sin (2017)
- Love Is Gone (2017)
- You'll Be Sorry (2017 version)
- Rhythm and Sex (2017)
- What'd You Say (2017)
- Into The Ground (2018)
