= Ákos Kovács (singer) =

Hungarian pop-rock singer-songwriter (born 1968)

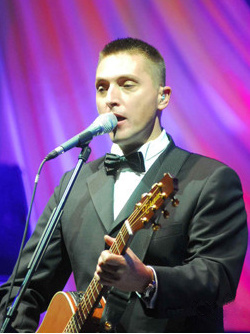
Ákos Kovács in 2008

Ákos Kovács (born in Budapest, 6 April 1968) is a Hungarian pop-rock singer-songwriter. He is known for his solo career writing and performing serious, poetic pop songs, as well as a member of the now defunct group Bonanza Banzai. Kovács uses his given name, Ákos, in his career. His name is written Akosh, to reflect the Hungarian pronunciation, when his music is distributed to English-speaking countries. His songs are on the top lists of Hungarian music.

== Personal life ==
Kovács grew up in a family of lawyers. A member of the Pier Paolo Pasolini film club, he aspired to be a film director, but his mother strictly forbade this. As a compromise, he attended the Corvinus University of Budapest and graduated in 1992 with a degree in foreign trade.

In addition to Hungarian, he speaks English and Italian. He is politically conservative. He is married to Krisztina Őry, and they have four children: Kata, Marci, Anna and Julia.

== Career ==
Kovács has been involved in many musical projects. He was a member of the Hungarian band Bonanza Banzai, which split in 1995. In 1999, he translated Phil Collins's songs for the Disney film Tarzan into Hungarian. In addition to music, Kovács also writes poetry.

He is the first Hungarian musician to have prepared a Blu-ray publication, namely the video and audio footage recorded during the 29 stations of the 40+ tour. The high quality of this publication is characterized by the fact that even the extras will be presented in high-definition. It is expected to be released in November 2009. After the release, he will take a few months break and will focus on the new songs for his upcoming album.

== Discography ==
- 1993 - Karcolatok
- 1993 - So Much Larger
- 1994 - Test
- 1994 - All is One
- 1995 - Indiántánc
- 1996 - Élő dalok
- 1996 - Firedance
- 1997 - Beavatás
- 1997 - ÚjRaMIX
- 1998 - I.D.S.
- 1998 - Ikon
- 1999 - Ismerj fel
- 1999 - Call My Name
- 2000 - Hűség
- 2001 - A hét parancsszó
- 2002 - Vertigo
- 2002 - Új törvény
- 2003 - Andante
- 2004 - Az utolsó hangos dal
- 2005 - X+I + Andante Extra
- 2006 - Még közelebb
- 2008 - Kaland a régi királlyal
- 2009 - 40+
- 2010 - A katona imája
- 2011 - Arénakoncert 2011
- 2012 - 2084

With Bonanza Banzai:

- 1989 - Induljon a banzáj!
- 1990 - A jel
- 1990 - The Compilation
- 1991 - 1984
- 1991 - A pillanat emlékműve
- 1991 - Monumentum
- 1992 - Bonanza Live Banzai
- 1992 - Elmondatott
- 1993 - Régi és új
- 1994 - Jóslat
- 1995 - Búcsúkoncert

Video albums:

- 1992 - Bonanza Live Banzai (VHS)
- 1994 - Bonanza Banzai Ünnep '93 (VHS)
- 1995 - Ákos a Budapest Sportcsarnokban (VHS)
- 1998 - Beavatás-koncertfilm (VHS)
- 1999 - Ismerj Fel (VHS)
- 2001 - Hűség (VHS and DVD)
- 2003 - Andante (VHS and DVD)
- 2004 - Az Utolsó Hangos Dal (VHS and double DVD)
- 2005 - Az Utolsó Hangos Dal - RÁADÁS (triple DVDs)
- 2007 – Még Közelebb – Koncertfilm (3 DVDs)
- 2008 - Bonanza Banzai - '87-'92 (DVD)
- 2009 - Bonanza Banzai - '94-'95 (DVD)
- 2009 - 40+ - Koncertfilm (DVD and Blu-ray Disc)
- 2010 - Szindbád Turné (DVD)
- 2011 - Arénakoncert 2011 (double DVD and Blu-ray Disc)

Poetry volumes:

- 1991 - Dúdolnom kell
- 1993 - Napló feletteseimnek
- 1995 - Szavak és csendek
- 1998 - Szív, seb, ész
- 2000 - A hűség könyve

== See also ==
- Hungarian pop
