= Nothing On but the Radio (disambiguation) =

Nothing On but the Radio is a song by Gary Allan. It may also refer to:

- "Nothin' On (But the Radio)", a 1983 song by Pantera on their debut album Metal Magic.
- "She's Got Nothing On (But the Radio)", a 2011 song by Roxette
- "Nothing On (But the Radio)", a 2023 song by Addison Rae from her EP AR
- "Nothing but the Radio On", a song by James & Michael Younger
