= Nothing On (But the Radio) =

2023 song by Addison Rae

- Artwork used on Rae's YouTube channel

Song by Addison Rae

from the EP AR
- Released: August 18, 2023
- Length: 2:29
- Label: Sandlot
- Songwriters: Billy Steinberg; Josh Alexander; Addison Rae; Jacob Kasher Hindlin; Madison Love
- Producers: Jack & Coke; Steinberg; Alexander

Licensed audio
- "Nothing On (But the Radio)" on YouTube

"Nothing On (But the Radio)" is a song by American singer Addison Rae from her debut extended play, AR, released on August 18, 2023 through Sandlot. Initially written by Billy Steinberg and Josh Alexander for American singer-songwriter Lady Gaga, the song never received an official release. However, by October 2010, an unfinished version of Lady Gaga's recording began circulating online, leading to the song becoming well known within the singer's fanbase. The official version, with additional writing credit for Rae, Madison Love and Jacob Kasher Hindlin, was described as a 2000s-sounding siren song with its title being a reference to a Marilyn Monroe quote.

== Writing and recording ==
"Nothing On (But the Radio)" was initially written by Billy Steinberg and Josh Alexander (Note: Various media outlets credit Lady Gaga as one of the songwriters, however American Society of Composers, Authors and Publishers (ASCAP) enlisted Billy Steinberg and Josh Alexander as sole writers of "Nothing On (But the Radio)". Addison Rae's version credits Rae, Jacob Kasher Hindlin, and Madison Love as songwriters, among Steinberg and Alexander.) around the 1952 Marilyn Monroe quote "It's not true I had nothing on, I had the radio on". Three versions of the song were recorded by the following artists: Lady Gaga, Paris Monroe, and Addison Rae. The latter released the song officially and received a songwriting credit, alongside Madison Love and Jacob Kasher Hindlin, hence they altered few lyrics. It was produced by Steinberg, Alexander and production duo Jack & Cole, with the latter two providing the track's instrumentation. Love recorded backing vocals and served as an executive producer, with the help of production co-ordinators Bianca Minniti-Bean and Jerry Eduoard. "Nothing On (But the Radio)" was mixed by Serban Ghenea (Note: AR booklet mentions Serban Ghenea as the sole mixer of "Nothing On (But the Radio)", while Tidal credits John Hanes as a mixer too.) at the MixStar Studios in Virginia Beach, and mastered by Chris Gehringer at the Sterling Sound in Edgewater. During a Q&A session in Grammy Museum, Rae said: "I got presented the opportunity to cut a version of it and I thought that was really exciting and fun".

== Leaks and release ==
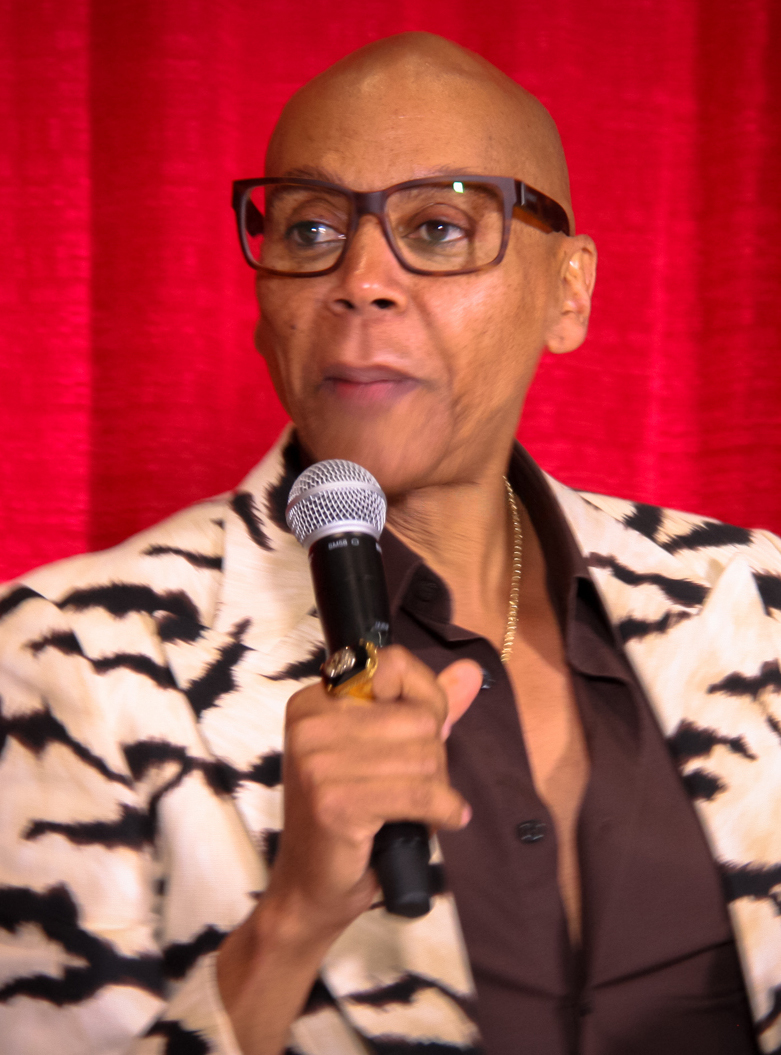
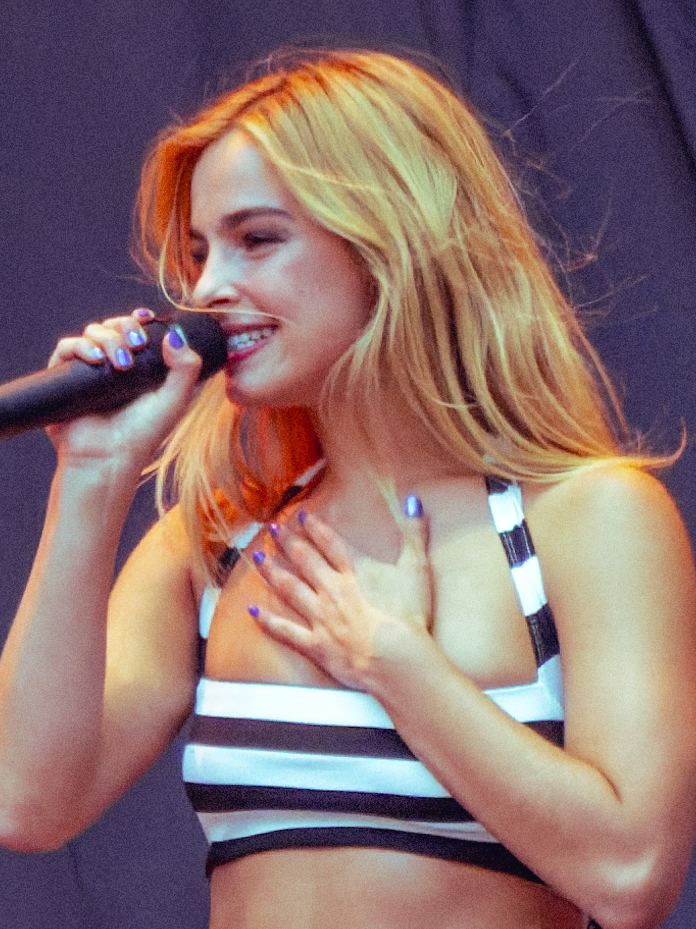
RuPaul (left) named "Nothing On (But the Radio)" one of his favorite Lady Gaga songs, while Rae (right) called that rendition "cool", and expressed that she wishes the original performer to listen to her version.

Lady Gaga's demo surfaced online in October 2010; however no public statement from the singer or the label has been issued about the song. Due to its retro 1990s-club sonicscape and previous leaks of her older unreleased tracks, Consequence writer Derek Staples speculated it might be a lingering outtake from The Fame (2008), highlighting its "catchy" hook and "synthesized guitar riffs" reminiscent of that album. Since then, Lady Gaga's rendition became a "beloved" "standom staple".

After becoming a successful TikTok star, Addison Rae launched her music career in 2021 with the release of her debut single "Obsessed". Set to be the lead single of her debut album, the song was critically panned, leading to shelving her musical project. The following year saw an influx of leaks of songs intended for her debut effort, including a cover of Lady Gaga's unreleased track "Nothing On (But the Radio)". A four-seconds snippet surfaced online on January 21, 2022, leading to mixed reactions from internet users. Rolling Stone writer Brittany Spanos credits a leak of this song, among with the original version of "2 Die 4", to spark interest of general public in Rae's discography. Four years earlier, the singer posted a TikTok lip-syncing to Lady Gaga's version.

On August 14, 2023, Rae announced that she would be releasing an EP made up of some unreleased songs which were intended to be a part of her "lost album". AR was released four days later through Sandlot, with "Nothing On (But the Radio)" being its third track. During the last stop of The Addison Tour, on October 22, 2025, at the Greek Theatre in Los Angeles, Rae performed the song for the first time as part of an encore.

== Critical reception ==
Josh Kurp off Uproxx described "Nothing On (But the Radio)" as a 2000s-sounding radio song. In a review for Vogue, Liam Hess called it a "deliciously silly siren call to a distant lover", noting that it is "much fun to listen to as Rae clearly had making it". Paste's Jaeden Pinder vowed "Nothing On (But the Radio)" as a "standout" moment on AR. On more sour note, Nylon's Stephanee Wang exemplified the track's production as an "unabashedly stroke a sort of nostalgia", sharing an anecdote of their friend comparing it to Lady Gaga's early input, especially The Fame.

== Credits and personnel ==
Credits adapted from Tidal and AR booklet.

Recording locations

- Mixed at MixStar Studios (Virginia Beach, Virginia)
- Mastered at Sterling Sound (Edgewater, New Jersey)

Personnel

- Addison Rae Easterling – main vocals, backing vocals, songwriting
- Billy Steinberg – songwriting, production
- Josh Alexander – songwriting, keyboards, bass, drums, percussion, programming, production
- Madison Love – backing vocals, songwriting, executive production
- Jacob Kasher Hindlin – songwriting
- Jack & Coke – keyboards, bass, drums, percussion, programming, production

- Bianca Minniti-Bean – production co-ordination
- Jerry Eduoard – production co-ordination
- Bryce Bordone – mixing engineering
- John Hanes – mixing
- Serban Ghenea – mixing
- Chris Gehringer – mastering
