= I Got It Bad (Addison Rae song) =

Song by Addison Rae

from the EP AR
- Released: August 18, 2023
- Genre: Synth-pop
- Length: 2:52
- Label: Sandlot
- Songwriters: Brett McLaughlin; Addison Rae; Oscar Görres; Madison Love; Rami Yacoub
- Producers: Oscar Görres; Rami Yacoub

Audio
- "I Got It Bad" on YouTube

"I Got It Bad" (stylized in sentence case) is a song by American singer Addison Rae from her debut extended play AR (2023). Rae wrote it with songwriters Madison Love and Leland and its producers, Oscar Görres and Rami Yacoub. The song became available as the EP's first track on August 18, 2023, when it was released by Sandlot Records.

Rae first teased "I Got It Bad" on social media in 2021, with demo versions then circulating online as leaks and going viral in the following year before its official release in 2023 with a reworked mix. It received positive reviews from critics, including Pitchfork, who deemed it a highlight from the EP and praised its early 2000s-inspired pop feel, drawing comparisons to Britney Spears, and Rae's delivery of lyrics that express infatuation with a "bad boy" to the point of obsession. It reached number 31 on the New Zealand Hot Singles chart. Rae performed the song for the first time during her debut concert The Addison Tour in 2025. The live version contained elements of "...Baby One More Time" by Spears.

== Background and release ==
Addison Rae initially teased various song snippets on her social media accounts while pursuing her music career following the release of her debut single "Obsessed" in 2021. Originally intended for a larger project that was later shelved after the single's tepid reception, "I Got It Bad" and other songs were leaked in 2022 and subsequently went viral causing fan interest to grow in Rae's unreleased material and encouraged her to revisit the idea of releasing more music. Rae addressed the hype, saying: "I've seen so much stuff about my unreleased song "I Got It Bad." I think it's so funny right now. I don’t know [when I'll release it]. We'll have to see, I guess. It just depends." English singer and songwriter Charli XCX also referenced the song during an interview in December 2022 when asked about working with Rae, stating: "I text her all the time 'release I Got It Bad'." On August 14, 2023, Rae announced she'd be releasing an extended play made up of some unreleased songs that were intended to be a part of her "lost album".

Leading up to AR's release, Rae started a countdown to the EP on her website and sharing posts on social media to build further anticipation, confirming the inclusion of highly-awaited tracks like "I Got It Bad" which was referred to as having been "particularly mythologised in pop circles since the demo was leaked [...] it seemed destined to enter the pop canon as a lost classic." She explained her decision to release the songs as a fan-centric move after seeing the demand and signaling her intent to further expand her music career.

== Composition ==
"I Got It Bad" is two minutes and 52 seconds long. The song was co-written by Rae with Madison Love and Leland, and producers Oscar Görres and Rami Yacoub, showcasing an upbeat, bass-heavy arrangement alongside Rae's vocal delivery of playful lyricism centered on themes of attraction and risky love about a naive girl smitten with a rebellious love interest, willing to "submit to the extremes of obsession." It was described as a "bouncing, juddering synth-pop tune" using a blend of early 2000s-inspired sounds and modern electronic elements, being compared to the work of Britney Spears.

== Critical reception ==
"I Got It Bad" received positive reviews from music critics. Pitchfork's Cat Zhang reviewed the track, calling it "a bedazzled turn-of-the-millennium pop song", and assessing that "there's an immediate reward" in its "blingy flourishes and bass-heavy breakdown." Liam Hess of Vogue described it as "a bona fide pop masterpiece with a welcome dose of weirdness," saying that it "recalls Britney at her peak, with an irresistible, swooping chorus and a juggernaut of a bridge." Cassidy Johnson of The Advance-Titan similarly declared it a "fun and flirty track, reminiscent of Y2K pop idol Britney Spears in both musical production and lyrics." Ones to Watch's Alessandra Rincon wrote that "I Got It Bad" is the song that "arguably benefitted the most from the reworked mix, introing the body of work with a new, refreshing energy," stating that is "an undeniably catchy track to the point that even her cynics will likely have difficulty finding fault in this flawless pop song."

== Charts ==
Chart performance for "I Got It Bad"
Chart (2023)	Peak position
New Zealand Hot Singles (RMNZ)	31
