= Naked (Ava Max song) =

2020 song by Ava Max

Promotional single by Ava Max

from the album Heaven & Hell
- Released: September 18, 2020
- Recorded: 2018
- Genre: Pop; dance-pop; electropop; synth-pop
- Length: 3:42
- Label: Atlantic
- Songwriters: Amanda Ava Koci; Bonnie McKee; Jessie Eden Malakouti; Henry Walter; Parrish Warrington; Diederik van Elsas
- Producers: Cirkut; Trackside

Music video
- "Naked" on YouTube

"Naked" is a song by American singer Ava Max, released through Atlantic Records on September 18, 2020, as the only promotional single from her debut studio album Heaven & Hell (2020). The song was written by Max, Bonnie McKee, Eden xo, Parrish Warrington, Diederik van Elsas and Cirkut, while produced by Cirkut and Trackside. It is a pop, dance-pop, electropop, and synth-pop song containing synthesizers and bass guitar. The lyrics depict the perception of Max's internalized emotions being emphasized past her physical appearance.

"Naked" received generally positive reviews from music critics; some praised the production, while other reviewers criticized the lyrics. The song peaked at number 38 on the New Zealand Hot Singles chart. An accompanying music video was directed by Hannah Lux Davis and was released on September 18, 2020. It depicts Max as an orange-haired alien, who was compared to Milla Jovovich's character from the science fiction film The Fifth Element (1997).

== Background and composition ==
"Naked" was released on September 18, 2020, which coincided with the release of Max's debut studio album Heaven & Hell. The song was written by Max, Bonnie McKee, Eden xo, Parrish Warrington, Diederik van Elsas, and Cirkut, while produced by Cirkut and Trackside. It was initially written as a ballad, but changed by Cirkut when Max was dissatisfied with its original concept. The song peaked at number 38 on the New Zealand Hot Singles chart.

Musically, "Naked" is a pop, dance-pop, electropop, and synth-pop song considered as "bass-driven", and resembles a power ballad. Synthesizers are used in the anthemic chorus as Max belts the lyric, "You can take off all my clothes and never see me naked". She stated that "Naked" is about "the real emotions [people] go through" and that they are "more than [their] physical bodies". Max additionally explained that her greatest vulnerabilities are kept to herself.

== Critical reception ==
Bailey Slater of Wonderland described "Naked" as a "deep and effortlessly catchy" pop song and favorably compared it to a strong B-side by Carly Rae Jepsen. Writing for Billboard, Jason Lipshutz stated that the song had one of the best chorus introductions in 2020, while Michael Cragg of The Guardian commented that it shared the "wistful, baked-in nostalgia" used in Katy Perry's 2010 song "Teenage Dream" as Max evoked Ariana Grande's "controlled yearning". Idolator writer Mike Wass opined that the "dreamy mid-tempo" song is a "highlight" of Heaven & Hell, while Neil Z. Yeung of AllMusic considered it to be "sleek".

Justin Curto of Vulture noted that while the lyrics resembled "vague Instagram captions", he praised the melody and production. He singled out the final bridge and chorus as Max's best attempt at channeling Mariah Carey, and was her "best vocal performance". Writing for Billboard Japan, Issei Honke opined that the song is "a little mundane", but acknowledged that it was "comfortable to listen to" and sounded recognizable to Japanese listeners. However, Us Weekly writer Nicholas Hautman criticized "Naked" for containing cliché lyrics about "stripping away clothes".

== Music video and live performance ==
An accompanying music video was directed by American music video director Hannah Lux Davis, and released alongside Heaven & Hell on September 18, 2020. It was filmed in the same weekend as Max's 2020 song "OMG What's Happening", which was also directed by Davis. The futuristic video depicts Max as an alien with "scant clothes and orange hair", who was compared to Milla Jovovich's character from the 1997 science fiction film The Fifth Element. Wass considered the visual to be "striking" and described Max's appearance as "peeling back the layers".

Max performed an acoustic version of "Naked" during her set of Maroon 5's 2020 Tour in 2021. She stated that it was the only acoustic song in her dance-heavy performances, which "kind of slows the show down".

== Credits and personnel ==
Credits adapted from Tidal.

- Amanda Ava Koci – vocals, songwriting
- Henry Walter – production, songwriting
- Trackside – production
- Bonnie McKee – songwriting
- Diederik van Elsas – songwriting
- Jessie Eden Malakouti – songwriting
- Parrish Warrington – songwriting
- Chris Gehringer – mastering
- Serban Ghenea – mixing
- John Hanes – engineering

== Charts ==
Chart performance for "Naked"
Chart (2020)	Peak position
New Zealand Hot Singles (RMNZ)	38
