= I Love You (Axwell & Ingrosso song) =

Single by Axwell & Ingrosso featuring Kid Ink
- Released: 10 February 2017
- Length: 3:11
- Label: Def Jam
- Songwriters: Axel Hedfors; Sebastian Ingrosso; Brian Todd Collins; Johnathan Carter Cunningham; Madison Love; Gerard Folkestad Taylor
- Producers: Axwell; Sebastian Ingrosso

Axwell & Ingrosso singles chronology
| "Thinking About You" (2016) | "I Love You" (2017) | "Renegade" (2017) |

Kid Ink singles chronology
| "Nasty" (2016) | "I Love You" (2017) | "Touch" (2017) |

"I Love You" is a song by Swedish dance music duo Axwell & Ingrosso featuring American rapper Kid Ink and also features uncredited vocals from Madison Love, who is also one of the co-writers of the song. The song was released on 10 February 2017. The song samples the 1997 song "Bitter Sweet Symphony" by the Verve.

== Music video ==
The music video was released on 8 March 2017 and directed by Colin Tilley.

== Track listing ==
Digital download
| No. | Title | Length |
|---|---|---|
| 1. | "I Love You" (featuring Kid Ink) | 3:11 |

Digital download – acoustic version
| No. | Title | Length |
|---|---|---|
| 1. | "I Love You - Stripped" (featuring Kid Ink) | 3:29 |

Digital download – remixes
| No. | Title | Length |
|---|---|---|
| 1. | "I Love You - Dub" (featuring Kid Ink) | 4:02 |
| 2. | "I Love You - William. remix" (featuring Kid Ink) | 3:01 |
| 3. | "I Love You - Machinedrum remix" (featuring Kid Ink) | 3:42 |
| 4. | "I Love You - David Puentez remix" (featuring Kid Ink) | 2:44 |

Digital download – Chace remix
| No. | Title | Length |
|---|---|---|
| 1. | "I Love You - Chace remix" (featuring Kid Ink) | 2:53 |

Digital download – CID remix
| No. | Title | Length |
|---|---|---|
| 1. | "I Love You - CID remix" (featuring Kid Ink) | 2:36 |

== Charts ==
=== Weekly charts ===
| Chart (2017–2018) | Peak position |
|---|---|
| Belgium (Ultratip Bubbling Under Flanders) | 30 |
| Hungary (Dance Top 40) | 35 |
| Hungary (Rádiós Top 40) | 23 |
| Netherlands (Single Top 100) | 56 |
| Sweden (Sverigetopplistan) | 10 |
| UK Singles (OCC) | 72 |
| US Dance Club Songs (Billboard) | 1 |
| US Hot Dance/Electronic Songs (Billboard) | 15 |
| US Pop Airplay (Billboard) | 31 |

=== Year-end charts ===
| Chart (2017) | Position |
|---|---|
| Sweden (Sverigetopplistan) | 52 |
| US Dance Club Songs (Billboard) | 46 |
| US Hot Dance/Electronic Songs (Billboard) | 46 |

== Certifications ==
| Region | Certification | Certified units/sales |
|---|---|---|
| Denmark (IFPI Danmark) | Gold | 45,000^{‡} |
| Sweden (GLF) | 3× Platinum | 120,000^{‡} |
^{‡} Sales+streaming figures based on certification alone.

== Release history ==
| Region | Date | Format | Label |
|---|---|---|---|
| Sweden | 10 February 2017 | Digital download | Def Jam |

== See also ==
- List of Billboard Dance Club Songs number ones of 2017
