= Ryan McMahon (singer) =

Canadian singer-songwriter (born 1979)

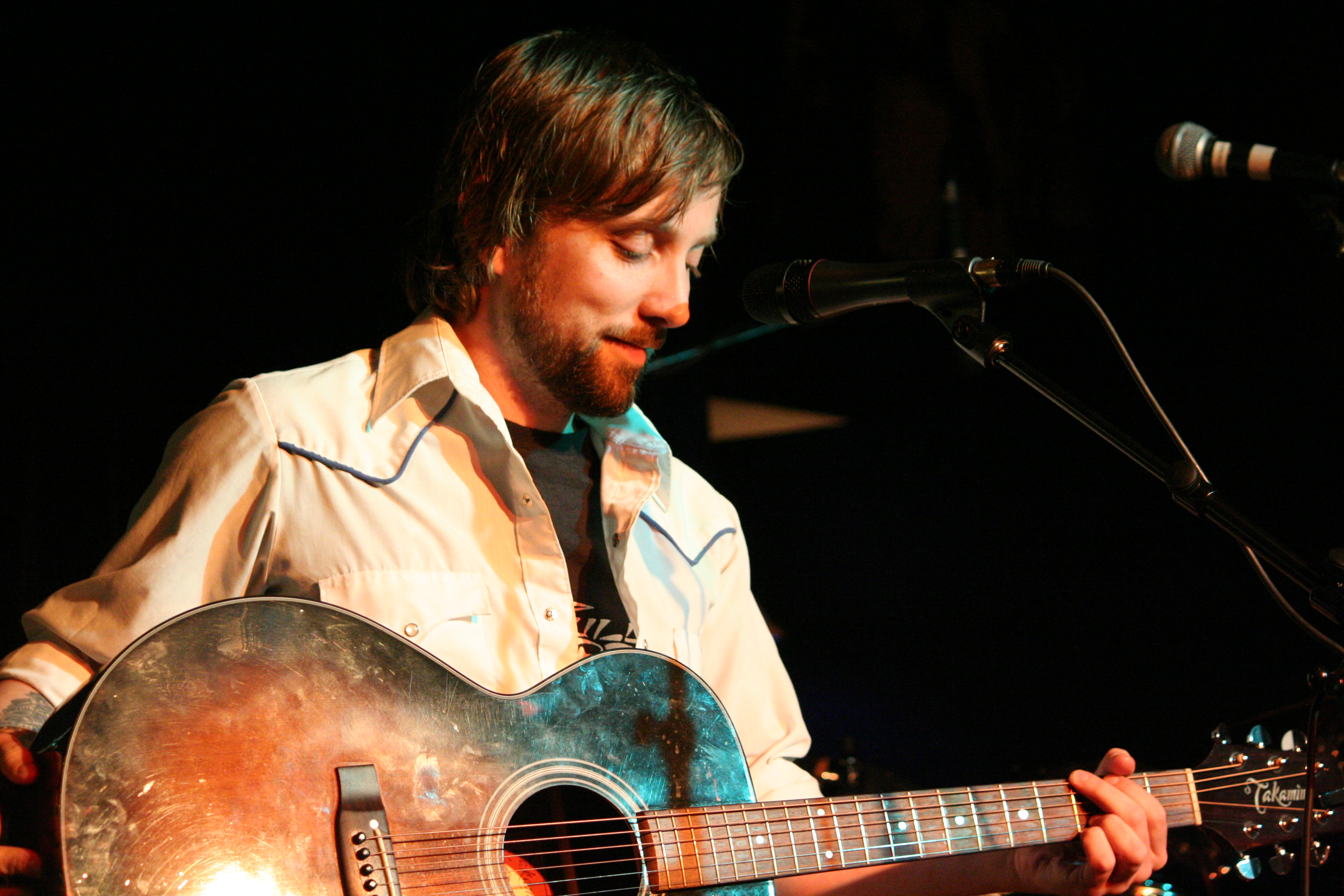
- Ryan McMahon performs at Joe's Garage in Courtenay, British Columbia, in 2011.

Background information
- Born: Ryan McMahon; 19 October 1979 (age 46); Chemainus, British Columbia
- Genres: Folk; folk rock; rock; roots; country; Americana
- Years active: 1999–present
- Website: ryanmcmahon.com

Ryan McMahon (born 19 October 1979) is a Canadian singer-songwriter from Ladysmith, British Columbia. He records and performs as a solo artist and also as a member of the folk/rock band Lion Bear Fox.

As a solo artist, McMahon won a record three Vancouver Island Music Awards for Album of the Year, Male Artist of the Year and Male Vocalist of the Year in 2012.

== Recording ==
McMahon released the album Better Days Gone By in 2006. His next effort, featuring songs written over the span of a decade, was Weeks, Months, Years, which was released in 2008. "It's a CD about time. It's a CD about growing into being a man and finding out what kind of fella I want to be", McMahon said while on tour celebrating the album's release. The song "Road Signs" from that album was included on Big Rock Brewery's 2009 compilation CD, Big Rock Untapped 2. In 2011, McMahon released All Good Stories, an acoustic album recorded at Richard Leighton's home studio in Lantzville, British Columbia. "All Good Stories is exactly that: a collection of stripped-down material that I needed to record in a very organic environment", McMahon has said. McMahon describes All Good Stories, which was named Album of the Year at the 2012 Vancouver Island Music Awards, as the most honest album he has created so far. "It was the first time that I'd ever let the songs stand by themselves", he says. "The whole mantra of that record was what is the least amount of stuff I can do to this record to make it great and just let it stand on its own."

McMahon released a new album titled Put Me Back Together in April 2015. McMahon, who has released five full-length albums in 15 years, says the record is a reflection of his time living on Vancouver Island. It includes a song that pays tribute to his hometown of Ladysmith. "There is a lot of reflection of living on Vancouver Island after living in the city for eight years", he told the Nanaimo News Bulletin. The new album features 11 new songs. All songs were produced and mixed by Christopher Arruda, except "I'll Be Damned", which was produced and mixed by Andre Wahl. The album was mastered by Joby Baker at Baker Studios.

In 2017, McMahon recorded a 5-song EP in his home studio 'The Song Shelter' entitled Song Shelter Recordings. "I wanted to take my lack of technology and couple it with all my experience that told me I wasn't skilled enough to record music, and throw it out the window. I wanted to make music as I did when I was 17 - I wanted no expectations, nobody telling me no, and most of all, I wanted to have fun. The result is a very flawed, honest recording of my state of mind at the time of the recording."

In January 2019 a video and single entitled Too Tired For Love was released in advance of the full-length record In Line For a Smile. McMahon worked with producer/collaborator Zak Cohen of Woodshop Recording Studios, outside Duncan, BC. Said Ryan: "In Zak, I've found the Jorge Calderon to my Warren Zevon. We finish each other's musical sentences, and generally are on the same page when it comes to serving the song."

In August 2021, McMahon signed on to track a single "One More Fire," which is arrived in April 2022 and was recorded and produced by a team in Vancouver's Warehouse Studios, including Jordan Pritchett & Danielle Marie King of Cross Parallel, Sheldon Zaharko and Canadian country music singer Aaron Pritchett.

During the COVID-19 pandemic, McMahon kept busy writing & recording at home, which resulted in several exclusive to BandCamp singles ("Are You Alright?" "I Still Want You") & cover songs of Fred Eaglesmith's "Trucker Speed," Pete Townshend's "Let My Love Open the Door" & a 6-song EP release entitled "Pandemos."

In November 2023, McMahon's 7th full-length album "Live Now" arrived, spawning 5 singles after 'One More Fire,' including 'Lost & Found', 'Feed Your Mind', 'A Song Can Change Your Mind', Sometimes Life's Amazing' & 'Driveway.' To date, Live Now stands as McMahon's most successful solo release, leading to tours supporting the Guess Who's Burton Cummings as well as Tom Cochrane.

During 2025, McMahon released a series of singles, including "Used to Be You" (Produced by Jordan Pritchett), as well as "Memoir" & "There She Is"; co-productions with 2x Juno Award Winner Steve Dawson & his 'Henhouse Pop-Up' gang, consisting of Jeremy Holmes on bass, Darryl Havers on organ & piano, Liam MacDonald on drums, and Dawson on electric guitars & pedal steel. The singles will likely be featured on a future record, with a release date yet-to-be-determined.

== Touring ==
McMahon tours as a solo artist and as a member of the lion the bear the fox. As a solo artist, McMahon has opened for and shared the stage with artists including Carole Pope, Valdy, Wil, Dayna Manning, Craig Cardiff, Lisa Loeb, Mother Mother and Nickelback. Touring with the lion the bear the fox, McMahon has shared the stage with and opened for artists such as Kim Mitchell, Lee Harvey Osmond, Elliott Brood, and The Steel Wheels. McMahon has described his performances as "Bruce Springsteen fighting Steve Earle with Eddie Vedder refereeing."

== Lion Bear Fox ==
The band formed after McMahon and two Vancouver-based singer-songwriters, Cory Woodward and Christopher Arruda, went on tour together as solo artists. The three men — who have three decades of experience between them — were friends before the tour, and they had intended to support one another's acts as separate artists. As the tour went on, they began to appear on stage with one another during live shows.

The band, which was a Top 20 Finalist in The Peak 102.7 FM's British Columbia-wide Peak Performance Project, released its debut EP, We'd Be Good Men, 8 October 2013.

"It’s made me a better person, being around them," says McMahon. "They are really, really smart and driven people. We each bring something different to the table. I have been able to glean some things from them that I wouldn’t have been able to learn on my own all this time.”

== Awards ==
In 2012, McMahon was nominated for five Vancouver Island Music Awards — the most of any Island musician. McMahon earned nominations for Artist of the Year, Male Songwriter of the Year and Male Vocalist of the Year, while his album All Good Stories was nominated as Album of the Year, and the official video for One Way was up for Music Video of the Year.

McMahon won three of those awards, taking home Artist of the Year, Male Vocalist of the Year, and Album of the Year.

== Megan McNeil and The Will to Survive ==
In 2010, McMahon met Megan McNeil, a singer from North Delta, British Columbia, who wrote a song called "The Will To Survive" while battling a rare type of adrenal cancer. McNeil's song, proceeds of which are donated to childhood cancer causes such as The James Fund for Neuroblastoma Research, was recorded with producer Garth Richardson – who has worked with Red Hot Chili Peppers and Nickelback – in Vancouver, British Columbia.

The song – and accompanying video – is a tribute to other children fighting cancer, some of whom McNeil met in chemotherapy wards and hospital hallways during her treatments, and McMahon helped McNeil arrange and record the song.

McNeil died January 8, 2011, at the age of 20 while battling cancer for the fourth time, and she continues to inspire McMahon.

In 2013, McMahon and his band, the lion the bear the fox, joined forces with the Vancouver, British Columbia-based charity Music Heals and created the Bandwagon Project initiative to raise money to bring a mobile recording studio used by music therapists called the Bandwagon to Vancouver Island. Bandwagon is the world's first mobile recording studio designed specifically for use by music therapists, and it contains microphones, instruments, a computer, recording software and more to aid therapists to work with patients.

The Bandwagon Project is inspired by McNeil's life and strength. "Megan's Will to Survive song, video and entire campaign wouldn't have seen the light if not for music therapy," says McMahon. "I just know how music affects me on a day-to-day basis. I can only imagine what having music at one's fingertips would mean to someone suffering from an illness of some kind. Music heals the soul ... it's been proven."

== Californication ==
McMahon's song "I'll Be Damned" was featured in the Showtime television series Californication, aired on Season 7, Episode 3 in April 2014.

== Discography ==
- Better Days Gone By (2006)
- Weeks, Months, Years (2008)
- All Good Stories (2011)
- We'd Be Good Men (Lion Bear Fox) (2013)
- Put Me Back Together (2015)
- Song Shelter Recordings (2017)
- Lion Bear Fox (Lion Bear Fox) (2017)
- In Line For a Smile (2019)
- Cutting Room Floor: Demos, Rarities & Things I Tried (2020)
- Pandemos (2021)
- Live Now (2023)
