= 2 Die 4 =

2023 song by Addison Rae

Song by Addison Rae featuring Charli XCX

from the EP AR
- Released: August 18, 2023
- Genre: Dance-pop · hyperpop
- Length: 2:06
- Label: Sandlot
- Composer: Andrew Goldstein
- Lyricists: Addison Rae; Andrew Goldstein; Brett McLaughlin; Charlotte Aitchison; Jacob Kasher Hindlin; Madison Love
- Producer: Andrew Goldstein

Audio
- "2 die 4" on YouTube

"2 Die 4" (stylized in all lowercase as "2 die 4") is a song by American singer Addison Rae featuring British singer Charli XCX, from Rae's debut extended play, AR (2023). It became available as the EP's second track on August 18, 2023, through Sandlot Records. A demo solo version of the track originally leaked in 2022 and went viral. Despite not being released as a single, it peaked at number 67 on the Irish chart and number 13 on the New Zealand Hot Singles chart.

The song marked the beginning of numerous collaborations for both Rae and Charli XCX. Since its release, the two have teamed up again on Charli XCX's remix of "Von Dutch" with A. G. Cook, and both are also featured on the track "Lucifer" from Cook's album, Britpop (2024).

== Background and composition ==
"2 Die 4" is a dance-pop song released on August 18, 2023 as part of her debut EP, AR. In an interview with Vogue, Rae declared that "I've looked up to Charli forever, and to have her as part of this means so much, as she's been supportive of me all the way. She's always been excited about my music."

A solo demo originally leaked shortly after Rae's debut single, "Obsessed", intended for her unreleased "lost album". Following strong criticism of her first single, Rae was initially hesitant to release more music. However, the leaked track quickly gained traction on TikTok, even earning praise from Charli XCX who had been working with Rae on other material for the album. After Rae announced the EP's release in 2023, it was speculated the song would be included in the tracklist. Rae recounted, "Charli had texted me and was like, 'I heard "2 Die 4" leaked. You know I love that song. Let me do a verse.'"

== Critical reception ==
Writing for British Vogue in 2023, Amel Mukhtar described "2 Die 4" as a "glittering hyper pop track that really is to die for." When discussing Rae's debut EP, Liam Hess from Vogue stated that "It wasn't just the leaks that piqued the interest of the online pop sleuths who begged for her return, but the unexpectedly eclectic music tastes fans have noticed via her Spotify. Scroll through her playlists and you'll find FKA Twigs, Yves Tumor, and Kelela sprinkled among hundreds of tracks that span recent avant-garde hip-hop to the cream of '00s Timbaland-produced R&B."

== Commercial performance ==
In Ireland, the song debuted and peaked at number 67 on the week ending August 25, 2023. In New Zealand, the song failed to debut on the NZ Top 40 Singles Chart, though did peak at number 13 on the NZ Hot Singles Chart on the week ending August 28, 2023.

== Live performances ==
Charli XCX and Rae performed the track together during the former's Boiler Room PARTYGIRL show in Brooklyn on February 22, 2024. Rae included the song in the setlist of her debut concert tour, The Addison Tour, in 2025. Charli XCX then joined Rae on stage during the October 22, 2025 concert of the tour at the Greek Theatre in Los Angeles.

== Charts ==
Chart performance for "2 Die 4"
Chart (2023)	Peak position
Ireland (IRMA)	67
New Zealand Hot Singles (RMNZ)	13

== Release history ==
Release history for "2 Die 4"
Country	Date	Format	Label	Ref.
Various	August 18, 2023	Digital download; streaming	Sandlot	
