= Kings & Queens (Ava Max song) =

2020 single by Ava Max

Single by Ava Max

from the album Heaven & Hell
- Released: March 12, 2020
- Recorded: August 2018 — September 2019
- Genre: Power pop
- Length: 2:42
- Label: Atlantic
- Songwriters: Amanda Ava Koci; Brett McLaughlin; Madison Love; Henry Walter; Nadir Khayat; Desmond Child; Mimoza Blinsson; Hillary Bernstein; Jakke Erixson
- Producers: Cirkut; RedOne

Ava Max singles chronology
"Alone, Pt. II" (2019)	"Kings & Queens" (2020)	"Who's Laughing Now" (2020)

Music video
- "Kings & Queens" on YouTube

"Kings & Queens" is a song by American singer-songwriter Ava Max, released on March 12, 2020, through Atlantic Records as the lead single from her debut studio album, Heaven & Hell (2020). The song was written by Ava Max, Brett McLaughlin, Desmond Child, Hillary Bernstein, Jakke Erixson, Madison Love, Mimoza Blinsson, and producers Cirkut and RedOne. It is a power pop song that consists of an electric guitar with synthesizers, incorporating the message of women's empowerment.

"Kings & Queens" received generally positive reviews from music critics, who praised the production, guitar solo, and lyrics. The song topped the charts in Israel, Poland, and Slovenia, while peaking at number 13 on the US Billboard Hot 100, and at number 19 on the UK Singles Chart. It attained a platinum certification in ten countries, including the United States and United Kingdom. An accompanying music video was directed by Isaac Rentz, which depicts a Khaleesi-inspired Max dancing in a heaven-themed throne room alongside a group of dancers while feasting at a banquet. A remix of the song titled "Kings & Queens, Pt. 2" was released on August 6, 2020, which features American singer Lauv and rapper Saweetie.

== Background and composition ==
"Kings & Queens" began development in 2018, when Max recorded the song in five separate studios located in Europe, Germany, and Los Angeles. The song went through ten different iterations which included different melodies and production, before the final version was completed around August to September 2019. Max wrote the verse and the pre-chorus alongside American songwriter Madison Love, before being given the chorus by Moroccan-Swedish record producer RedOne. The chorus originally just contained the melody, but was reworked in the studio with Leland, Love and Cirkut. Max decided to include the electric guitar in the track to complement the pop electronic sound in her music. "Kings & Queens" was announced on February 27, 2020, where Max confirmed that Cirkut, RedOne, and Love were involved with production. She later revealed the song's release date, with the title and artwork on March 7, 2020. It was written by Max, Leland, Child, Hillary Bernstein, Jakke Erixson, Love, Mimoza Blinsson, and producers Cirkut and RedOne.

Musically, "Kings & Queens" is a power pop song, which contains several pulsing verses and a hook containing synthesizers. The guitar solo following the second verse includes elements of glam rock, which Jon Blistein of Rolling Stone noted as having a "Queen-esque quality". Max stated that the lyrics to "Kings & Queens" describe how the world would be a better place with women or "queens" in power. She likened it to her previous song "So Am I" (2019), acknowledging that it contained a similar message about women's empowerment. A line taken from the 1865 book Alice's Adventures in Wonderland by the Queen of Hearts was used in the song, "Disobey me, then baby, it's off with your head". Chess metaphors are incorporated in the lyrics.

Upon "Kings & Queens" release in 2020, comparisons were drawn to Bon Jovi's "You Give Love a Bad Name", and Bonnie Tyler's "If You Were a Woman (And I Was a Man)", both of which were co-written by Desmond Child approximately 35 years prior; reviews highlighted Desmond Child's credit as a songwriter for "Kings & Queens".

== Critical reception ==
Writing for MTV News, Madeline Rothman praised the song's strong electric guitar solo with the lyric, "You might think I'm weak without a sword / But if I had one it'd be bigger than yours". Mike Nied of Idolator noted that the single "highlights Ava's ability to fill dance floors across the globe". Nicholas Hautman of Us Weekly described "Kings & Queens" as "one of the best singles to come out of 2020 so far", praising Max's "powerful and theatrical vocals" and the guitar solo. Writing for Uproxx, Caitlin White described the lyrics as "a subtle tribute to the power of women and a call to action for men to support the queens in their life", while Heran Mamo of Billboard acknowledged that it compared chess moves to feminism; "In chess, the king can move one space at a time / But queens are free to go wherever they like". Soundigest writer Andrew Chinikidiadi praised the transitions of the electric guitar riff into the bridge and the song's ending. However, he lamented the repetition and duration of the track.

Billboard staff ranked "Kings & Queens" at number 53 on their listicle of The 100 Best Songs of 2020, acknowledging that it was the "unofficial anthem of the parade-free 2020 Pride season" during lockdown from the COVID-19 pandemic. They additionally placed the song on their unranked listicle of the 30 Best Pop Songs of 2020, comparing the "deceptively heartfelt" sound to hair metal from the 1980s.

== Commercial performance ==
"Kings & Queens" debuted at number 73 on the Billboard Hot 100 chart dated August 22, 2020, where it peaked at number 13 on the chart dated November 24, 2020. It also topped the Adult Top 40 chart dated December 12, 2020. The song was certified double platinum by the Recording Industry Association of America (RIAA) on June 1, 2022, for sales of 2,000,000 units in the US. It was the first time Child's interpolated melody received a platinum certification since being used in 35 years. "Kings & Queens" peaked at number 15 on the Canadian Hot 100 for the chart dated January 16, 2021, and was eventually certified quadruple platinum by Music Canada (MC) on April 8, 2022, for 320,000 track-equivalent sales.

In the United Kingdom, "Kings & Queens" bowed at number 19 on the UK Singles Chart dated July 3, 2020, where it was certified double platinum for selling 1,200,000 equivalent units in the country. In Israel, the song peaked at number one on the Media Forest airplay chart dated May 24, 2020. "Kings & Queens" also topped the Polish Airplay Top 100 on the chart issued June 27, 2020, where it was certified quadruple platinum by the Polish Society of the Phonographic Industry (ZPAV) for track-equivalent sales of 200,000 units. In Australia, the song bowed at number 31 on the ARIA Singles Chart dated October 4, 2020, where it charted for 11 weeks.

== Music video ==
A visualizer was released along with the song on March 12, 2020, which depicts Max as a queen holding a glass of champagne and sword, with a royal deck of cards. She confirmed on the song's release date that she already filmed the official music video, describing it as "very colorful, super fun, crazy dancing, and a big celebration", and likened it to a rainbow. The music video was released on March 27, 2020, and is directed by Isaac Rentz. Max is seen dancing in a heaven-themed throne room with a group of dancers, as she was inspired by Khaleesi from American television series Game of Thrones, and wanted to portray an Amazonian queen surrounded by warriors. Max and Rentz used a moodboard to list several ideas for the feminist-themed music video, with the former often texting ideas to the latter during the night to ensure that it would be perceived as "authentic and personal". Max envisioned the video to be "royal, but in a modern, futuristic kind of way", to ensure that it would feel simple.

The video opens with Max striking poses on a golden throne while holding a sword between her legs. She then organizes a banquet, in which several dancers begin drinking champagne and eating food, before performing a dance sequence. During the pre-bridge guitar solo, the dancers wield electric axes. These events rotate amongst themselves and are interspersed with Max on a giant chessboard, knocking over the playing pieces.

== Track listing ==
Digital download – single
No.	Title	Length
1.	"Kings & Queens"	2:42

Digital download – acoustic
No.	Title	Length
1.	"Kings & Queens" (Acoustic)	3:08

Digital extended play – The Remixes
No.	Title	Length
1.	"Kings & Queens" (James Carter Remix)	2:16
2.	"Kings & Queens" (Until Dawn Remix)	3:15
3.	"Kings & Queens" (MOTi Remix)	3:00
4.	"Kings & Queens" (Fairlane Remix)	3:35

== Credits and personnel ==
Credits adapted from Tidal.

- Amanda Ava Koci – vocals, songwriting
- Henry Walter – songwriting, production
- RedOne – songwriting, production
- Chris Gehringer – mastering
- Serban Ghenea – mixing
- Brett McLaughlin – songwriting
- Desmond Child – songwriting
- Hillary Bernstein – songwriting
- Jakke Erixson – songwriting
- Madison Love – songwriting
- Mimoza Blinsson – songwriting

== Charts ==
=== Weekly charts ===
Weekly chart performance for "Kings & Queens"
Chart (2020–2021)	Peak position
Australia (ARIA)	31
Austria (Ö3 Austria Top 40)	12
Belgium (Ultratop 50 Flanders)	4
Belgium (Ultratop 50 Wallonia)	9
Brazil (Top 100 Brasil)	91
Canada Hot 100 (Billboard)	15
Canada AC (Billboard)	9
Canada CHR/Top 40 (Billboard)	5
Canada Hot AC (Billboard)	1
CIS Airplay (TopHit)	6
Croatia International Airplay (Top lista)	6
Czech Republic Airplay (ČNS IFPI)	1
Czech Republic Singles Digital (ČNS IFPI)	7
Estonia (Eesti Tipp-40)	30
Euro Digital Song Sales (Billboard)	5
Finland (Suomen virallinen lista)	15
France (SNEP)	32
France Airplay (SNEP)	1
Germany (GfK)	16
Germany Airplay (BVMI)	1
Global 200 (Billboard)	31
Greece Airplay (IFPI Greece)	11
Greece International (IFPI Greece)	37
Hungary (Dance Top 40)	1
Hungary (Rádiós Top 40)	1
Hungary (Single Top 40)	3
Hungary (Stream Top 40)	4
Iceland (Tónlistinn)	11
Ireland (IRMA)	25
Israel International Airplay (Media Forest)	1
Italy (FIMI)	38
Lithuania (AGATA)	24
Mexico Airplay (Billboard)	23
New Zealand Hot Singles (RMNZ)	20
Netherlands (Dutch Top 40)	3
Netherlands (Single Top 100)	9
Norway (VG-lista)	7
Poland Airplay (ZPAV)	1
Portugal (AFP)	77
Romania (Airplay 100)	5
Russia Airplay (TopHit)	23
San Marino (SMRRTV Top 50)	35
Scottish Singles Sales (Official Charts)	5
Slovakia Airplay (ČNS IFPI)	4
Slovakia Singles Digital (ČNS IFPI)	16
Slovenia (SloTop50)	1
South Korea BGM (Circle)	94
Spain (PROMUSICAE)	74
Sweden (Sverigetopplistan)	21
Switzerland (Schweizer Hitparade)	5
UK Singles (Official Charts)	19
Ukraine Airplay (TopHit)	1
US Billboard Hot 100	13
US Adult Contemporary (Billboard)	3
US Adult Pop Airplay (Billboard)	1
US Dance Airplay (Billboard)	4
US Pop Airplay (Billboard)	2
US Rolling Stone Top 100	63

2022 weekly chart performance for "Kings & Queens"
Chart (2022)	Peak position
Hungary (Dance Top 40)	7
Hungary (Rádiós Top 40)	22

2023 weekly chart performance for "Kings & Queens"
Chart (2023)	Peak position
Hungary (Dance Top 40)	21
Hungary (Rádiós Top 40)	31

2024 weekly chart performance for "Kings & Queens"
Chart (2024)	Peak position
Belarus Airplay (TopHit)	92
Hungary (Rádiós Top 40)	27

2025 weekly chart performance for "Kings & Queens"
Chart (2025)	Peak position
Hungary (Rádiós Top 40)	27

2026 weekly chart performance for "Kings & Queens"
Chart (2026)	Peak position
Hungary (Rádiós Top 40)	27
Norway Airplay (IFPI Norge)	94

=== Year-end charts ===
2020 year-end chart performance for "Kings & Queens"
Chart (2020)	Position
Austria (Ö3 Austria Top 40)	13
Belgium (Ultratop Flanders)	15
Belgium (Ultratop Wallonia)	48
CIS Airplay (TopHit)	36
France (SNEP)	81
Germany (Official German Charts)	17
Greece International (IFPI)	80
Hungary (Dance Top 40)	12
Hungary (Rádiós Top 40)	26
Hungary (Single Top 40)	10
Hungary (Stream Top 40)	7
Italy (FIMI)	84
Netherlands (Dutch Top 40)	21
Netherlands (Single Top 100)	38
Poland (Polish Airplay Top 100)	13
Romania (Airplay 100)	37
Russia Airplay (TopHit)	75
Sweden (Sverigetopplistan)	35
Switzerland (Schweizer Hitparade)	14
UK Singles (OCC)	71
Ukraine Airplay (TopHit)	75
US Adult Top 40 (Billboard)	44
US Dance/Mix Show Airplay (Billboard)	28
US Mainstream Top 40 (Billboard)	43

2021 year-end chart performance for "Kings & Queens"
Chart (2021)	Position
Canada (Canadian Hot 100)	33
CIS (TopHit)	48
Croatia International Airplay (Top lista)	50
Global 200 (Billboard)	150
Hungary (Dance Top 40)	7
Hungary (Rádiós Top 40)	28
Hungary (Stream Top 40)	47
Netherlands (Airplay Top 50)	47
Russia Airplay (TopHit)	93
Ukraine Airplay (TopHit)	28
US Billboard Hot 100	73
US Adult Contemporary (Billboard)	4
US Adult Top 40 (Billboard)	4
US Mainstream Top 40 (Billboard)	25

2022 year-end chart performance for "Kings & Queens"
Chart (2022)	Position
CIS (TopHit)	154
Hungary (Dance Top 40)	38
Hungary (Rádiós Top 40)	53
Ukraine Airplay (TopHit)	129

2023 year-end chart performance for "Kings & Queens"
Chart (2023)	Position
Belarus Airplay (TopHit)	198
CIS (TopHit)	168
Hungary (Dance Top 40)	74
Hungary (Rádiós Top 40)	65

2024 year-end chart performance for "Kings & Queens"
Chart (2024)	Peak position
Belarus Airplay (TopHit)	141
CIS Airplay (TopHit)	188
Hungary (Rádiós Top 40)	55

2025 year-end chart performance for "Kings & Queens"
Chart (2025)	Peak position
Hungary (Rádiós Top 40)	45

== Certifications ==
Certifications and sales for "Kings & Queens"
Region	Certification	Certified units/sales
Austria (IFPI Austria)	2× Platinum	60,000^{‡}
Belgium (BRMA)	Platinum	40,000^{‡}
Brazil (Pro-Música Brasil)	3× Platinum	120,000^{‡}
Canada (Music Canada)	4× Platinum	320,000^{‡}
Denmark (IFPI Danmark)	Platinum	90,000^{‡}
France (SNEP)	Diamond	333,333^{‡}
Germany (BVMI)	3× Gold	600,000^{‡}
Italy (FIMI)	Platinum	70,000^{‡}
New Zealand (RMNZ)	2× Platinum	60,000^{‡}
Norway (IFPI Norway)	3× Platinum	180,000^{‡}
Poland (ZPAV)	4× Platinum	200,000^{‡}
Portugal (AFP)	Platinum	10,000^{‡}
Spain (Promusicae)	Platinum	60,000^{‡}
United Kingdom (BPI)	2× Platinum	1,200,000^{‡}
United States (RIAA)	2× Platinum	2,000,000^{‡}
Streaming
Japan (RIAJ)	Gold	50,000,000^{†}
^{‡} Sales+streaming figures based on certification alone.^{†} Streaming-only figures based on certification alone.

== Release history ==
Release dates and formats for "Kings & Queens"
Region	Date	Format(s)	Version	Label	Ref.
Various	March 12, 2020	Digital download; streaming	Original	Atlantic	
Italy	April 10, 2020	Radio airplay	Original	Warner	
Various	April 22, 2020	Digital download; streaming	Acoustic	Atlantic	
Various	April 30, 2020	Digital download; streaming	The Remixes	Atlantic	
United States	July 7, 2020	Contemporary hit radio	Original	Atlantic	
Various	August 6, 2020	Digital download; streaming	"Pt. 2"	Atlantic	
United States	August 10, 2020	Hot adult contemporary radio	Original	Atlantic	

== Kings & Queens, Pt. 2 ==
"Kings & Queens, Pt. 2"

Single by Ava Max featuring Lauv and Saweetie
- Released: August 6, 2020
- Recorded: 2020
- Length: 2:55
- Label: Atlantic
- Songwriters: Amanda Ava Koci; Brett McLaughlin; Madison Love; Henry Walter; Nadir Khayat; Desmond Child; Mimoza Blinsson; Hillary Bernstein; Jakke Erixson; Ari Leff; Jacob Kasher Hindlin; Derrick Milano; Diamonte Harper
- Producers: Cirkut; RedOne

Lauv singles chronology
"Slow Grenade" (2020)	"Kings & Queens, Pt. 2" (2020)	"Sweet & Sour" (2020)

Saweetie singles chronology
"Bussin 2.0" (2020)	"Kings & Queens, Pt. 2" (2020)	"Money Mouf" (2020)

A remix of the song titled "Kings & Queens, Pt. 2" was released on August 6, 2020. It features American singer Lauv and rapper Saweetie. The song was recorded during quarantine from the COVID-19 pandemic, after initiation from Max.

=== Composition and lyrics ===
"Kings & Queens, Pt. 2" incorporates a new second verse from Lauv, who described the male perspective of being in a relationship with a strong, independent woman. He incorporates Auto-Tune in his vocals, which replaces his lovelorn lyrical style. Saweetie also adds a rap verse in the song, continuing the theme of female empowerment.

=== Track listing ===
Digital download – Kings & Queens, Pt. 2
No.	Title	Length
1.	"Kings & Queens, Pt. 2" (featuring Lauv and Saweetie)	2:55
