= AR (EP) =

- Digital and CD cover art

EP by Addison Rae
- Released: August 18, 2023
- Recorded: 2020–2021
- Genre: Bubblegum pop
- Length: 9:42
- Label: Sandlot
- Producers: Alexander 23; Andrew Goldstein; Benny Blanco; Billy Steinberg; Blake Slatkin; Jack & Coke; Oscar Görres; Rami Yacoub; Ryan McMahon; Michael Pollack; Nick Sarazen; Madison Love; Jacob Kasher Hindlin

Addison Rae chronology
AR (2023)	Addison (2025)

AR is the debut extended play by American singer Addison Rae. It was released on August 18, 2023, through Sandlot Records. AR is a bubblegum pop record which Rolling Stone described as "plasticky, pristine pop that online audiences ironically, and then unironically, eat up." It consists of four songs, while Rae's debut single "Obsessed" appears as a bonus track on Spotify.

The EP was met with positive reviews for its earworms, catchy hooks, and Rae's ability to channel the nostalgia of the 2000s and 2010s pop era. On Spotify, the project was ranked among the top 10 biggest opening weeks for a female EP in Spotify history with 6.6 million streams. The EP also debuted at number 19 on the US Billboard Heatseekers Albums chart.

== Background ==
In March 2021, Rae released her debut single "Obsessed". Two months later, she began teasing the release of a debut album. She revealed that album would be about "experiences that [she's] gone through or feelings that [she's] had and just different mindsets that [she's] kind of been in over the past year". In June 2021, It was revealed that Rae was working on an extended play (EP) with artists such as Charli XCX and Benny Blanco, and that she had four songs ready to be released. In September 2021, Rae was supposed to perform live at iHeartRadio Music Festival but she later announced that she isn't ready to perform yet. Despite its supposed release in 2021, the project was shelved after the reception of Rae's debut single, and she considered giving up on music entirely.

In January 2022, snippets of Rae's unreleased tracks went viral online and garnered positive reactions. The song "I Got It Bad", which was teased in 2021, got leaked alongside "Nothing On (But the Radio)" which was originally an unreleased song recorded by Lady Gaga. Throughout the year, more unreleased demos from Rae were leaked online. She quickly built a cult following among "queer pop-culture obsessives" after they noticed via her Spotify that her music taste "spans recent avant-garde hip-hop to the cream of '00s Timbaland-produced R&B." After Rae saw fans' enthusiasm over the leaked material, she regained the confidence to release more music.

In February 2023, Rae began teasing new music again after she changed her Spotify bio to "Addison Rae 2023". On August 14, 2023, Rae announced that she would be releasing an EP made up of some unreleased songs which were intended to be a part of her "lost album". She stated she "wanted this EP to be the end note to the past few years, and a stepping stone forward in [her] career."

== Reception ==
AR received favorable reviews from critics. Jason Lipshutz from Billboard wrote that the EP "does not sound like a collection of odds and ends: instead, the five songs engross the listener with fresh melodies and bursts of personality, showcasing the 22-year-old as a quick study within this brand of pop," adding that "the whole project is worth bookmarking as the potential start of something big." Cat Zhang of Pitchfork stated that Rae "delivers the kind of plasticky, pristine pop that online audiences ironically, and then unironically, eat up," reviewing the track "I Got It Bad" by describing it as "a bedazzled turn-of-the-millennium pop song" and assessing that "there's an immediate reward in the song's blingy flourishes and bass-heavy breakdown." Liam Hess of Vogue also highlighted "I Got It Bad" calling it "a bona fide pop masterpiece with a welcome dose of weirdness," continuing that it "recalls Britney at her peak, with an irresistible, swooping chorus and a juggernaut of a bridge."

Nylon's Steffanee Wang wrote that "the music is worth it. [AR]'s brand of pop is the kind you can't look too closely at because there really isn't anything much deeper to gleam. Everything it is and will be is already on display on its gleaming, shiny outside." Larisha Paul of Rolling Stone commented that the EP "digs up some of the most anticipated songs she has teased with snippets and sneak peeks in the time since she made her musical debut," calling "2 Die 4" a standout "collaboration with pop maestro Charli XCX." Writing for Ones to Watch, Alessandra Rincon said that Rae "can finally add verified pop star to her ever-growing résumé," claiming that "I Got It Bad" is the song that "arguably benefitted the most from the reworked mix, introing the body of work with a new, refreshing energy," calling it "an undeniably catchy track to the point that even her cynics will likely have difficulty finding fault in this flawless pop song."

== Commercial performance ==
AR debuted at number 19 on the US Billboard Heatseekers Albums and reached number forty-five on the Top Current Album Sales chart in October 2023.

== Track listing ==
Credits adapted from the liner notes of AR.

AR – Standard edition
No.	Title	Writer(s)	Producer(s)	Length
1.	"I Got It Bad"	Addison Rae Easterling; Brett McLaughlin; Madison Love; Oscar Görres; Rami Yacoub	Görres; Yacoub	2:52
2.	"2 Die 4" (featuring Charli XCX)	Easterling; Andrew Goldstein; McLaughlin; Charlotte Aitchison; Jacob Kasher Hindlin; Love	Goldstein	2:06
3.	"Nothing On (But the Radio)"	Easterling; Billy Steinberg; Hindlin; Josh Alexander; Love	Jack & Coke; Alexander; Steinberg	2:29
4.	"It Could've Been U"	Easterling; Alexander Glantz; Tia Scola	Alexander 23	2:15
Total length:				9:42

AR – Spotify bonus track
No.	Title	Writer(s)	Producer(s)	Length
5.	"Obsessed"	Easterling; McLaughlin; Ryan McMahon; Benjamin Levin; Blake Slatkin; Love; Scola	Benny Blanco; Slatkin; McMahon	2:15
Total length:				11:57

Notes

- "I Got It Bad" is stylized in sentence case.
- "2 Die 4" and "It Could've Been U" are stylized in all lowercase.

== Personnel ==
Credits adapted from the liner notes of AR.

=== Performers ===
- Addison Rae – vocals (all tracks); background vocals (3)
- Charli XCX – vocals (2)
- Andrew Goldstein – keyboards, programming (2)
- Madison Love – background vocals (3); executive producer
- Jakob Hazell – bass guitar, drums, keyboards, percussion, programming (3)
- Josh Alexander – bass guitar, drums, keyboards, percussion, programming (3)
- Svante Halldin – bass guitar, drums, keyboards, percussion, programming (3)
- Alexander 23 – bass guitar, drums, guitar, programming, synthesizer (4)

=== Production and recording ===
- Chris Gehringer – mastering
- Serban Ghenea – mixing (1–3)
- John Hanes – mixing (4)
- Bryce Bordone – mixing assistant
- Bart Schoudel – engineering (2)
- Bianca Minniti-Bean – A&R, production coordination
- Jerry Edouard – A&R, production coordination

== Charts ==
Chart (2023)	Peak position
US Heatseekers Albums (Billboard)	19
US Top Current Album Sales (Billboard)	45

== Release history ==
Release dates and formats for AR
Region	Date	Format(s)	Label	Ref.
Various	August 18, 2023	Digital download; streaming	Sandlot	
United States	October 13, 2023	CD	Sandlot	
United States	December 1, 2023	LP	Sandlot	
