= Who's Laughing Now (Ava Max song) =

2020 single by Ava Max

Single by Ava Max

from the album Heaven & Hell
- Released: July 30, 2020
- Genre: Dance-pop
- Length: 3:00
- Label: Atlantic
- Songwriters: Amanda Ava Koci; Jonnali Parmenius; Linus Wiklund; Måns Wredenberg; Madison Love; Henry Walter
- Producers: Cirkut; Lotus IV

Ava Max singles chronology
"Kings & Queens" (2020)	"Who's Laughing Now" (2020)	"OMG What's Happening" (2020)

Music video
- "Who's Laughing Now" on YouTube

"Who's Laughing Now" is a song by American singer-songwriter Ava Max, released on July 30, 2020, through Atlantic Records as the second single from her debut studio album, Heaven & Hell (2020). The song was written by Max, Madison Love, Måns Wredenberg, Noonie Bao, and producers Cirkut and Lotus IV. It is a dance-pop song with lyrics about a girl being gaslighted, and continues from Max's 2018 song "Sweet but Psycho". "Who's Laughing Now" reached number one in Poland, and charted in the top ten in eight countries. An accompanying music video was directed by Isaac Rentz and depicts Max seeking revenge on her boss and cheating boyfriend.

== Background and development ==
Max first teased "Who's Laughing Now" on her social media accounts on May 28, 2020, before officially announcing the single's initial June 2, 2020 release date, and cover art the next day. The release date was subsequently postponed because it coincided with Blackout Tuesday. She then announced that the song would be released on June 25, 2020, but was also indefinitely delayed on June 17, 2020. She eventually announced that it would be released on July 30, 2020. The cover art depicts a topless Max positioned in front of a flaming background. "Who's Laughing Now" was written by Max, Madison Love, Måns Wredenberg, Noonie Bao, Cirkut and Lotus IV, with the latter two handling production.

== Composition and critical reception ==
"Who's Laughing Now" is a dance-pop song, which contains several minor chords. Neil Z. Yeung of AllMusic compared the song's island groove to artists such as Clean Bandit and Ace of Base. It was written as a continuation from her 2018 song "Sweet but Psycho", as the lyrics both describe a misunderstood girl being gaslighted, and serve as an analogy to Max's own experiences being rejected in the music industry. She summarized the song as "basically telling everyone to just fuck off". Max stated that "Who's Laughing Now" is targeted towards females who had bullied her throughout middle school, causing her to start home-school. The song's title was envisioned after a self-discovery revelation by Max.

Writing for Us Weekly, Nicholas Hautman praised the chorus of "Who's Laughing Now", indicating that it had the catchiest "don't cha" since the Pussycat Dolls song "Don't Cha" (2005). However, Issy Sampson of The Guardian criticized the song for sounding similar to "Sweet but Psycho", which she described as an "irritating earworm". She added that the former used a "smug" horrible personality trait in place of "psychotic."

== Music video ==
The music video was directed by Isaac Rentz and released on July 30, 2020. Max is depicted as a person seeking revenge after being fired by her boss and cheated on by her boyfriend. She is seen dancing in a destroyed office and breaking a car with a crowbar, before breaking free of a psychiatric hospital while strapped in a straitjacket. Max wrote the video's plot, which she decided to incorporate several female characters into a corporate workforce dominated by men. One character portrayed by Max is gaslighted by a doctor into becoming "psycho", while another had musical instruments appearing from her head, which was parallel to her own negative experiences with music executives. An interactive quiz was launched as a collaboration with Spotify prior to the release of Max's debut studio album Heaven & Hell (2020). It contains 10 questions asking about personality, resulting in the choice of one of four characters portrayed in the music video; Amanda, Torrence, Carmen, and Ava.

== Track listings ==
Digital download / Streaming

1. "Who's Laughing Now" – 3:00

Digital download / streaming – The Remixes

1. "Who's Laughing Now" (Breathe Carolina Remix) – 2:24
2. "Who's Laughing Now" (Cat Dealers Remix) – 3:40

Digital download / streaming – The Remixes

1. "Who's Laughing Now" (KOLIDESCOPES Remix) – 3:20
2. "Who's Laughing Now" (COASTR. Remix) – 3:36
3. "Who's Laughing Now" (Jordan Jay Remix) – 2:34

Streaming

1. "Who's Laughing Now" (Breathe Carolina Remix) – 2:24
2. "Who's Laughing Now" (Cat Dealers Remix) – 3:40
3. "Who's Laughing Now" – 3:00

Streaming

1. "Who's Laughing Now" (KOLIDESCOPES Remix) – 3:20
2. "Who's Laughing Now" (COASTR. Remix) – 3:36
3. "Who's Laughing Now" (Jordan Jay Remix) – 2:34
4. "Who's Laughing Now" (Breathe Carolina Remix) – 2:24
5. "Who's Laughing Now" (Cat Dealers Remix) – 3:40
6. "Who's Laughing Now" – 3:00

== Personnel ==
Credits adapted from Tidal.

- Amanda Ava Koci – vocals, songwriting
- Henry Walter – songwriting, production, programming
- Linus Wiklund – songwriting, production, programming
- Madison Love – songwriting
- Måns Wredenberg – songwriting
- Jonnali Parmenius – songwriting
- Chris Gehringer – mastering
- Serban Ghenea – mixing
- John Hanes – engineering

== Charts ==
=== Weekly charts ===
Weekly chart performance for "Who's Laughing Now"
Chart (2020–2021)	Peak position
Austria (Ö3 Austria Top 40)	60
Belgium (Ultratop 50 Flanders)	8
Belgium (Ultratop 50 Wallonia)	4
CIS Airplay (TopHit)	59
Croatia (HRT)	9
Czech Republic Singles Digital (ČNS IFPI)	87
Czech Republic Airplay (ČNS IFPI)	31
Euro Digital Song Sales (Billboard)	19
Estonia (Eesti Tipp-40)	38
Finland (Suomen virallinen singlelista)	4
Finnish Albums (Suomen virallinen albumit) The Remixes	8
France (SNEP)	68
Germany (GfK)	65
Global Excl. U.S. (Billboard) (Note: The Billboard Global Excl. U.S. chart was launched in September 2020. Therefore, "Hallucinate" did not have a full run on the chart.)	125
Hungary (Rádiós Top 40)	4
Hungary (Single Top 40)	6
Iceland (Tónlistinn)	6
Lithuania (AGATA)	40
Mexico Airplay (Billboard)	36
Netherlands (Dutch Top 40)	12
Netherlands (Single Top 100)	55
New Zealand Hot Singles (RMNZ)	14
Norway (VG-lista)	8
Poland Airplay (ZPAV)	1
Romania (Airplay 100)	74
Scottish Singles Sales (Official Charts)	31
Slovakia Airplay (ČNS IFPI)	10
Slovakia Singles Digital (ČNS IFPI)	61
Slovenia (SloTop50)	10
South Korea BGM (Circle)	66
Sweden (Sverigetopplistan)	63
Switzerland (Schweizer Hitparade)	34
UK Singles (Official Charts)	93
Ukraine (TopHit)	63

=== Year-end charts ===
Year-end chart performance for "Who's Laughing Now" in 2020
Chart (2020)	Position
Hungary (Single Top 40)	75
Iceland (Tónlistinn)	67
Poland (Polish Airplay Top 100)	64
Switzerland (Schweizer Hitparade)	93

Year-end chart performance for "Who's Laughing Now" in 2021
Chart (2021)	Position
Belgium (Ultratop Flanders)	87
Croatia (ARC Top 100)	66
Hungary (Rádiós Top 40)	27
Netherlands (Dutch Top 40)	73

== Certifications ==
Certifications and sales for "Who's Laughing Now"
Region	Certification	Certified units/sales
Austria (IFPI Austria)	Gold	15,000^{‡}
Brazil (Pro-Música Brasil)	Gold	20,000^{‡}
France (SNEP)	Platinum	200,000^{‡}
Norway (IFPI Norway)	Platinum	60,000^{‡}
Poland (ZPAV)	2× Platinum	100,000^{‡}
^{‡} Sales+streaming figures based on certification alone.

== Release history ==
Release dates and formats for "Who's Laughing Now"
Region	Date	Format(s)	Version	Label	Ref.
Various	July 30, 2020	Digital download; streaming	Original	Atlantic	
Various	August 12, 2020	Digital download; streaming	The Remixes (Note: Two extended plays containing remixes of "Who's Laughing Now" were released on digital download and streaming formats. The version released on August 12, 2020, contained the Breathe Carolina and Cat Dealers remixes, while another version released on August 20, 2020, contained the KOLIDESCOPES, COASTR. and Jordan Jay remixes. Additionally two extended plays containing remixes were released on Spotify; the version released on August 14, 2020, contained the same remixes as the extended play from August 12, 2020, with the original version appearing last in the track listing. Another extended play was released on August 21, 2020, which contained every released remix and the original song.)	Atlantic	
Various	August 14, 2020	Streaming	The Remixes	Atlantic	
Various	August 20, 2020	Digital download; streaming	The Remixes	Atlantic	
Various	August 21, 2020	Streaming	The Remixes	Atlantic	
Italy	September 18, 2020	Radio airplay	Original	Warner	
