= OMG What's Happening =

2020 single by Ava Max

Single by Ava Max

from the album Heaven & Hell
- Released: September 3, 2020
- Recorded: 2020
- Genre: Disco-funk; disco-pop
- Length: 2:59
- Label: Atlantic
- Songwriters: Amanda Ava Koci; Sorana Păcurar; Roland Spreckley; Henri Antero Salonen; Henry Walter; Jason Gill
- Producers: Ava Max; Cirkut; Hank Solo

Ava Max singles chronology
| "Who's Laughing Now" (2020) | "OMG What's Happening" (2020) | "Christmas Without You" (2020) |

Music video
- "OMG What's Happening" on YouTube

"OMG What's Happening" is a song by American singer-songwriter Ava Max, released on September 3, 2020, through Atlantic Records, as the third single from her debut studio album, Heaven & Hell (2020). The disco-funk and disco-pop song was written by Max, Roland Spreckley, Henri Antero Salonen, Sorana Păcurar, Cirkut and Jason Gill, and produced by the latter two writers alongside Hank Solo. A music video was released on October 29, 2020, which was directed by American music video director Hannah Lux Davis. It depicts Max racing against other drivers in muscle cars.

== Background and development ==
Max first teased the release of "OMG What's Happening" on her social media accounts on August 31, 2020. She posted the song's official cover art on September 2, 2020, and announced that it would be released the next day, stating that it was one of her favorite songs on Heaven & Hell. The cover art depicts Max wearing a red cowboy hat and gloves, while standing on top of a monster truck. "OMG What's Happening" was written by Max, Roland Spreckley, Henri Antero Salonen, Sorana Pacurar, with producers Cirkut and Jason Gill. Hank Solo was also involved in production. The lyric, "There's something about your face / I don't know whether to kiss it or punch it" was initially recorded by Max in quarantine from the 2020 COVID-19 pandemic as a joke, but she decided to keep it in the song.

== Composition and critical reception ==
"OMG What's Happening" is a disco-funk and disco-pop song. Jon Pareles of The New York Times stated that it was part of the "disco revival" preceded by music released from Doja Cat, Dua Lipa, and Lady Gaga, while Issei Honke of Billboard Japan additionally specified that "OMG What's Happening" followed 2020 songs such as Doja Cat's "Say So" (2020), and Lipa's "Don't Start Now" (2019). The song contains Dominican bachata guitar syncopations which transition into disco hi-hats, synthesizers and rhythm guitar. It also uses a chord progression from Gloria Gaynor's 1978 song "I Will Survive", which inverses its lyrical message about being "smitten" in place of the original song's message of "independence". "OMG What's Happening" utilizes vibey hooks and a spoken-word bridge, while Max performed high-wire vocal undulations compared to Marina Diamandis.

Mike Wass from Idolator described "OMG What's Happening" as a "loved-up banger" that "finds the pop star head over heels". Writing for Us Weekly, Nicholas Hautman stated that it was "disco realness", while Honke wrote that the song resembled a "disco-like atmosphere" from the late 1970s.

== Music video ==
American music video director Hannah Lux Davis announced her involvement in the music video on her social media accounts on September 2, 2020. It was filmed during the same weekend as Max's 2020 song "Naked", which was also directed by Davis. Prior to the video's release, Max mentioned that it involved a large truck and several fast muscle cars in the desert. A lyric video was released on September 3, 2020, which coincided with the song's release. The music video was released on October 29, 2020, which depicts Max as a driver on a truck covered with flames, while racing on an empty highway against another taunting driver.

== Personnel ==
Credits adapted from Tidal.

- Amanda Ava Koci – vocals, songwriting, production
- Henry Walter – songwriting, production
- Jason Gill – songwriting, production
- Henri Antero Salonen – songwriting
- Roland Spreckley – songwriting
- Sorana Pacurar – songwriting
- Hank Solo – production
- Chris Gehringer – mastering
- Serban Ghenea – mixing
- John Hanes – engineering

== Charts ==
=== Weekly charts ===
Weekly chart performance for "OMG What's Happening"
| Chart (2020) | Peak position |
|---|---|
| Croatia (HRT) | 70 |
| Finland (Suomen virallinen albumilista) | 17 |
| Hot Canadian Digital Song Sales (Billboard) | 50 |
| Hungary (Single Top 40) | 25 |
| Lithuania (AGATA) | 52 |
| Norway (VG-lista) | 32 |
| Romania (Airplay 100) | 79 |
| Scottish Singles Sales (Official Charts) | 95 |
| South Korea BGM (Circle) | 24 |
| Sweden (Sverigetopplistan) | 72 |
| Switzerland (Schweizer Hitparade) | 65 |
| US Digital Song Sales (Billboard) | 39 |

=== Monthly charts ===
Monthly chart performance for "OMG What's Happening"
| Chart (2020) | Peak position |
|---|---|
| South Korea BGM (Circle) | 31 |

=== Year-end charts ===
Year-end chart performance for "OMG What's Happening"
| Chart (2021) | Position |
|---|---|
| Ukraine Airplay (Tophit) | 182 |

== Certifications ==
Certifications and sales for "OMG What's Happening"
| Region | Certification | Certified units/sales |
|---|---|---|
| Norway (IFPI Norway) | Gold | 30,000^{‡} |
| Poland (ZPAV) | 2× Platinum | 100,000^{‡} |
^{‡} Sales+streaming figures based on certification alone.

== Release history ==
Release dates and formats for "OMG What's Happening"
| Region | Date | Format(s) | Label | Ref. |
|---|---|---|---|---|
| Various | September 3, 2020 | Digital download; streaming | Atlantic | |
