= Heaven & Hell (Ava Max album) =

2020 studio album by Ava Max

Studio album by Ava Max
- Released: September 18, 2020
- Recorded: 2017 – March 2020
- Studios: MXM Studios (Stockholm); A Studio (Los Angeles)
- Genres: Pop; dance-pop; electropop
- Length: 44:45
- Label: Atlantic
- Producers: A Strut; Cirkut; Earwulf; Freedo; Hank Solo; Ava Max; Lotus IV; RedOne; Shellback; Trackside

Ava Max chronology
Amanda Kay (2008)	Heaven & Hell (2020)	Diamonds & Dancefloors (2023)

Singles from Heaven & Hell
- 1. "Kings & Queens" Released: March 12, 2020; 2. "Who's Laughing Now" Released: July 30, 2020; 3. "OMG What's Happening" Released: September 3, 2020; 4. "My Head & My Heart" Released: November 19, 2020

Heaven & Hell is the debut studio album by American singer-songwriter Ava Max. It was released by Atlantic Records on September 18, 2020. Max recorded the album from December 2018 to March 2020, where she collaborated with composers including Cirkut, RedOne, Charlie Puth, and Bonnie McKee. Musically, Heaven & Hell is a pop, dance-pop, and electropop record split into two sides; the former contains anthemic sounds, while the latter incorporates darker melodies.

The album was released to generally favorable reviews from music critics, many of whom praised the production and Max's vocal abilities but criticized the lyrics and lack of originality. Heaven & Hell peaked at number two on the UK Albums Chart and at number 27 on the US Billboard 200. It has since been certified platinum by the Recording Industry Association of America (RIAA) in the United States and gold by the British Phonographic Industry (BPI) in the United Kingdom.

== Background and development ==
Following the release of "Sweet but Psycho" in August 2018, Max toured overseas for 30 to 40 days before returning to the United States around Christmas that same year, where she began writing for her then-untitled debut studio album. In April 2019, Max first announced that she would release the album sometime during the year, discussing in an interview with Billboard that "there are some other tracks on there that are like wild cards, and there are a few that I'm being vulnerable in". She recorded over a hundred songs for Heaven & Hell, which she spent several months on deciding what to include. The album was initially completed in early 2019, but was delayed in order to improve the tracklist by adding more songs and removing one.

In December 2019, Max hinted that Heaven & Hell would be released in the upcoming months. She confirmed that it was in the process of being finalized, but was subsequently delayed due to the COVID-19 pandemic. When asked about the album by MTV News shortly after the release of "Kings & Queens", she stated that the previously released singles with the exception of "Sweet but Psycho" were not included on the tracklist. "So Am I", "Salt" and "Torn" eventually made the final tracklist, which Max added due to fan demand. She also decided to include the album's introductory song "Heaven" in March 2020, while re-arranging each track on Heaven & Hell based on her instincts.

== Production and artwork ==
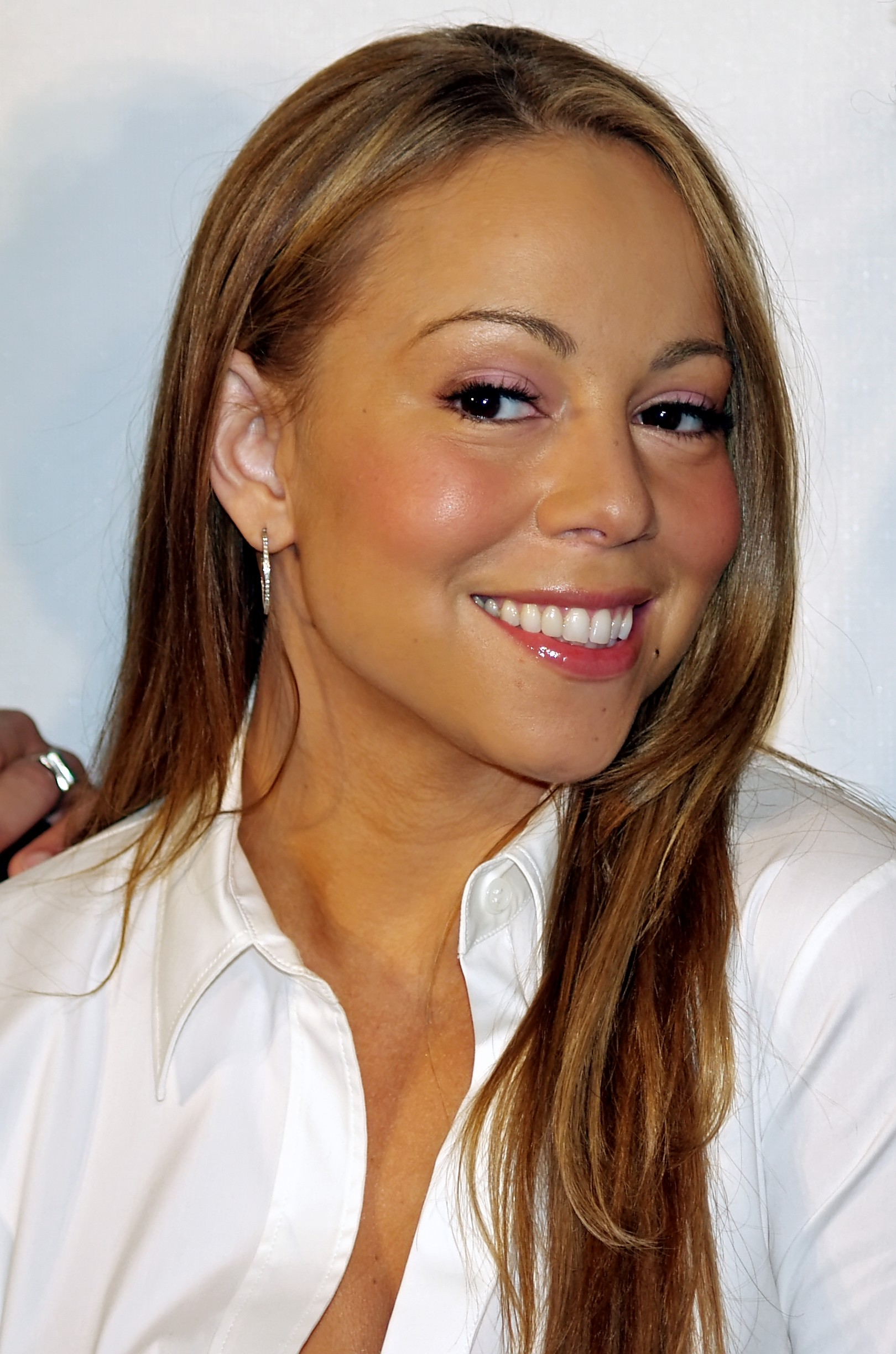
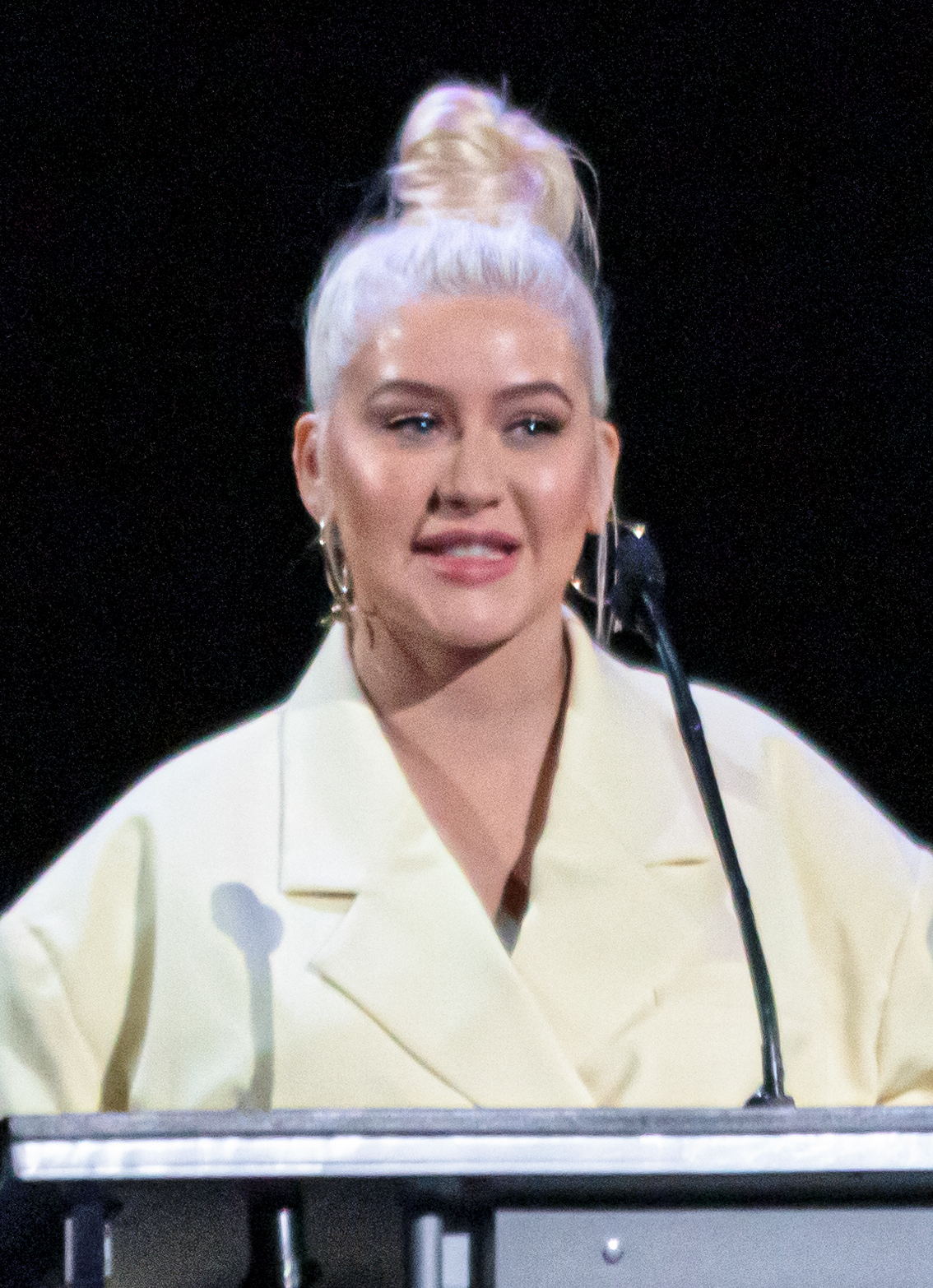
Max cited Mariah Carey (left) and Christina Aguilera (right) as inspirations for Heaven & Hell.

Musically, Heaven & Hell contains genres of pop, dance-pop, and electropop, with lyrical themes of love, feminism, and resilience. Max insisted on wanting an upbeat energy to the album so that it would be cohesive, reasoning that she did not want every song to sound the same. She described some songs as "very strong and empowering", while others "are a little bit more emotional". Max refused to include a ballad on the album, as she believed that she would need to include at least four ballads without removing any dance tracks. She additionally stated that Heaven & Hell is a collection of music inspired by artists from her childhood such as Britney Spears, Christina Aguilera, and Mariah Carey. Cirkut, RedOne, Charlie Puth and Bonnie McKee were involved in the album's production. It is split into two sides; Side A: Heaven, and Side B: Hell. The former consists of light energetic songs which serve as anthems, while the latter consists of darker and moodier melodies. Max first envisioned the concept before performing at the 2019 MTV Video Music Awards, after including the album title as a lyric in the bridge of "Torn", eventually placing the song as the "purgatory" track of Heaven & Hell.

Max enlisted creative director Charlotte Rutherford to create visuals for Heaven & Hell through direct messages, where she created the album's cover art, which contains a mirror image of Max's asymmetric blonde and orange hair in two different colors. Max explained that she wanted it to be "pretty simple" as she used several crazy ideas in previous covers. The back cover and 12-page booklet contains photos which depict heaven being in space and hell being on earth, which she described as an "entire world that I created". A thematic palette of orange and blue was incorporated into the album's visuals, with the colors specifically chosen by Max. She stated that the color blue symbolized "sky and light", while orange was "more fiery but also vibrant".

== Promotion ==
Max announced the release date and title of Heaven & Hell on July 29, 2020, which was accompanied by the release of "Who's Laughing Now" the next day. A tour supporting the album was originally planned for September to October 2020 in the United States, but was cancelled due to the pandemic. A launch party was virtually held on the game platform Roblox on September 25, 2020, which included a "question and answer" forum with Max, an interactive concert, and a merchandise store. During the party, Max appeared on a large floating screen to discuss the album, before performing on a background surrounded by flashing lights and fireworks, which transformed into an animated version of hell. Over 1,156,000 players appeared at the event, which caused Roblox to consider integrating more virtual concerts on the platform. Max stated in October 2020 that a deluxe edition of the album was planned to be released at the end of the year and acknowledged that it was in the process of being completed, but indicated in September 2021 that she had moved on from Heaven & Hell in favor of developing her second album.

=== Singles ===
"Kings & Queens" was released on March 12, 2020, as the lead single from the album. It reached the summit of the Polish Airplay Top 100 and charted in the top 20 in Austria, Finland, Germany, Norway, Switzerland, the US, and the UK. "Who's Laughing Now" was released on July 30, 2020, where it topped the Polish Airplay Top 100 and charted in the top 10 in Finland and Norway. "OMG What's Happening" was released on September 3, 2020. "My Head & My Heart" was released on November 19, 2020, and was included on the digital edition of Heaven & Hell.

The album includes other singles. "Sweet but Psycho" was released on August 17, 2018, and is the debut single by the singer. It became a breakthrough song for Max, ultimately reaching number one in 22 countries and charting at number 10 on the US Billboard Hot 100. "So Am I" was released on March 7, 2019, which peaked at number one on the Polish Airplay Top 100 and charted in the top 10 in 14 countries. "Torn" was released on August 19, 2019, where it reached the top 10 in Latvia, Poland, Slovakia, and Slovenia. "Salt" was released on December 12, 2019, after receiving high streaming numbers on SoundCloud, despite containing no prior marketing or promotion. The song topped the Polish Airplay Top 100 and charted within the top 10 in Austria, Finland, Germany, Norway, Russia, Ukraine, and Switzerland.

=== Promotional singles ===
A music video for the first promotional single, "Naked" was released along with the album's release on September 18, 2020, which was directed by Hannah Lux Davis. The Japanese Edition also includes the promotional single "Not Your Barbie Girl" (2018).

== Critical reception ==
Professional ratings
Review scores
Source	Rating
AllMusic	4/5 stars
Evening Standard	3/5 stars
The Guardian	4/5 stars
Spectrum Culture	3.5/5 stars
Us Weekly	3/4 stars

Writing for AllMusic, Neil Z. Yeung stated that Heaven & Hell is "an expertly crafted gem", praising the album for showcasing Max's sonic range and personality. Jason Lipshutz of Billboard noted that it was an "unrelentingly uptempo body of work", with several tracks containing electropop genres. He highlighted Max's vocal theatrics on "OMG What's Happening" and concluded that "Naked" had one of the best chorus introductions in 2020. Lipshutz placed Heaven & Hell on his unranked listicle of The 25 Best Pop Albums of 2020, stating that Max "sounds like she's having a blast" and praised her decision to not incorporate ballads on the album. Writing for The Guardian, Michael Cragg praised Heaven & Hell for having an impeccable melodic infrastructure. Although he contrasted it to Katy Perry's 2020 studio album Smile, which The Atlantic labeled as "too complex for 2D", Cragg acknowledged that originality was not a priority for Max and stated that there was "something glorious about its dogged aversion to anything other than 2D escapism". Michael Chaiken of Republican-American wrote that the medium tempo album was "very good pop music" with great hooks, comparing it to songs released early in Lady Gaga's career. Writing for The National, Saeed Saeed noted that every track in Heaven & Hell contained "colossal hooks carried by oceans of synth lines and club-stomping beats", which were accompanied by Max's maximal vocals. He described Max as an "intriguing prospect" before concluding that the album was "anything but subtle".

Nicholas Hautman of Us Weekly noted that the album's upbeat tracklist was presented similar to a phonograph record, where the first side was "more pop-driven and carefree", while the latter half took "a darker, moodier approach". However, he disliked the cliché lyrics in songs such as "Naked" and "Salt", insisting that the former was about "stripping away clothes", while the latter was about "crying so much that you literally run out of the electrolytes needed to form tears". Writing for Spectrum Culture, Jeffrey Davies noted the lack of innovation and individuality on Heaven & Hell, in addition to the staggered single releases from over a year ago, stating that "Who's Laughing Now" and "OMG What's Happening" were "out of place". However, he commended Max's strong vocals and artistic talent for creating a nostalgic feeling on the dance floor, noting that she was reminiscent of artists such as Paula Abdul and Taylor Dayne. Helena Wadia of Evening Standard wrote that while Max was skilled at "writing catchy tunes", she criticized the album for its use of "manufactured pop" and "lyrical tropes", concluding that it "ultimately lacks personality".

== Commercial performance ==
In the United Kingdom, Heaven & Hell debuted at number two on the UK Albums Chart dated September 25, 2020, where it charted for 32 non-consecutive weeks, and received a gold certification on February 11, 2022, for selling 100,000 equivalent units in the United Kingdom. The album charted on the Norwegian VG-lista chart at number eight, eventually peaking at number two the next week. It was certified septuple platinum by IFPI Norway on November 9, 2020, for selling over 140,000 units in the country. On the Polish Oficjalna Lista Sprzedaży (OLiS) dated October 1, 2020, Heaven & Hell debuted at the number 25 peak, and was certified platinum by the Polish Society of the Phonographic Industry (ZPAV) on November 18, 2020, for sales of 20,000 units in Poland.

In the United States, Heaven & Hell bowed at number 27 on the Billboard 200 chart dated October 3, 2020. It was eventually certified platinum by the Recording Industry Association of America (RIAA) on June 1, 2022, for sales of 1,000,000 certified units in the country. On the Canadian Albums Chart, the album peaked at number 16 on the chart dated October 3, 2020. It received a platinum certification from Music Canada (MC) on August 27, 2021, for selling over 80,000 units in Canada. In Brazil, Heaven & Hell was certified platinum by Pro-Música Brasil (PMB), denoting over 40,000 sales and streaming figures. On the Japanese Oricon Albums Chart, the album peaked at number 42 on the chart dated September 28, 2020. In Australia, Heaven & Hell debuted on the ARIA Albums Chart at the number seven peak on the chart dated October 4, 2020, where it remained for two weeks.

== Track listing ==
All tracks were produced by Cirkut with additional producers as noted.

Heaven & Hell – standard edition
No.	Title	Lyrics	Music	Producer(s)	Length
1.	"Heaven"	Amanda Ava Koci	Henry Walter		1:46
2.	"Kings & Queens"	Koci; Madison Love; Brett McLaughlin	Walter; Jakke Erixon; Nadir Khayat; Desmond Child; Mimoza Blinson; Hillary Bernstein	RedOne	2:42
3.	"Naked"	Koci; Bonnie McKee; Jessica Malakouti	Walter; Parrish Warrington; Diederik van Elsas	Trackside	3:42
4.	"Tattoo"	Koci; Andreas Haukeland	Elof Loelv; Charles Puth Jr.; Jacob Kasher Hindlin; Walter	Loelv; Hindlin	2:39
5.	"OMG What's Happening"	Koci; Sorana Păcurar; Roland Spreckley	Walter; Jason Gill; Henri Antero Salonen	Ava Max; Hank Solo	2:59
6.	"Call Me Tonight"	Koci; Love; Ebba Tove Nilsson	Jakob Jerlstrom; Johan Schuster; Walter	Shellback; A Strut	2:50
7.	"Born to the Night"	Koci; Love; Spreckley	Walter; Thomas Eriksen; Peter Schilling	Earwulf	3:19
8.	"Torn"	Koci; Love; Samuel Denison Martin	James Lavigne; Eriksen; Walter		3:18
9.	"Take You to Hell"	Koci; Love; Spreckley	Khristian Arenada; Maria Jane Smith; Victor Thell; Walter	Smith & Thell	2:44
10.	"Who's Laughing Now"	Koci; Love; Noonie Bao	Linus Wiklund; Måns Wredenberg; Walter	Lotus IV	3:00
11.	"Belladonna"	Koci	Loelv; Walter	Loelv	3:23
12.	"Rumors"	Koci; Love; Pacurar	Jonas Becker; Timofei Crudu; Samuel John Gray; Fridolin Walcher; Christoph "Shuko" Bauss; Walter	Freedo; Shuko	3:12
13.	"So Am I"	Koci; Gigi Grombacher; Spreckley	Puth Jr.^{[a]}; Smith; Thell; Walter	Smith & Thell	3:04
14.	"Salt"	Koci; Love	Autumn Rowe; Nicole Morier; Walter		3:00
15.	"Sweet but Psycho"	Koci; Love; Haukeland	William Lobban-Bean; Walter	Cook Classics	3:07
Total length:					44:45

Heaven & Hell – digital reissue
No.	Title	Lyrics	Music	Producer(s)	Length
1.	"My Head & My Heart"	Koci; Love; Tia Scola	Walter; Eriksen; Aleksey Potekhin; Sergey Zhukov	Jonas Blue; Earwulf	2:54
Total length:					47:39

Heaven & Hell – Japanese CD edition
No.	Title	Writer(s)	Producer(s)	Length
8.	"Kings & Queens" (acoustic)	Koci; Love; McLaughlin; Walter; Erixon; Khayat; Child; Blinson; Bernstein	RedOne	3:08
17.	"Not Your Barbie Girl"	Koci; Love; Walter; Claus Norreen; Søren Rasted		3:07
18.	"So Am I" (acoustic)	Koci; Grombacher; Puth Jr.^{[a]}; Walter; Smith; Thell; Spreckley; Walter		3:04
19.	"Salt" (acoustic)	Koci; Love; Rowe; Morier; Walter		3:10
20.	"Sweet but Psycho" (acoustic)	Koci; Love; Haukeland; Lobban-Bean; Walter		2:59
Total length:				62:59

=== Notes ===
- "Heaven" is stylized as "H.E.A.V.E.N".
- "Kings & Queens" interpolates the song "If You Were a Woman (And I Was a Man)" (1986), written by Desmond Child and performed by Bonnie Tyler.
- "Born to the Night" interpolates the song "Major Tom (Coming Home)" (1983), written and performed by Peter Schilling.
- ^{^a} On "So Am I", Charlie Puth is credited under the pseudonym Martin Sue.
- "My Head & My Heart" interpolates the song "Around the World (La La La La La)" (2000), written by Aleksey Potekhin and Sergey Zhukov, and performed by ATC.
- "Not Your Barbie Girl" interpolates the song "Barbie Girl" (1997), written by Søren Rasted, Claus Norreen, René Dif and Lene Nystrøm, and performed by Aqua.

== Charts ==
=== Weekly charts ===
Weekly chart performance for Heaven & Hell
Chart (2020–2021)	Peak position
Australian Albums (ARIA)	7
Austrian Albums (Ö3 Austria)	6
Belgian Albums (Ultratop Flanders)	7
Belgian Albums (Ultratop Wallonia)	14
Canadian Albums (Billboard)	16
Croatian Albums (HDU)	14
Czech Albums (ČNS IFPI)	5
Danish Albums (Hitlisten)	13
Dutch Albums (Album Top 100)	6
Finnish Albums (Suomen virallinen lista)	6
French Albums (SNEP)	14
German Albums (Offizielle Top 100)	7
Hungarian Albums (MAHASZ)	2
Icelandic Albums (Tónlistinn)	28
Irish Albums (Official Charts)	17
Italian Albums (FIMI)	28
Japanese Albums (Oricon)	42
Japanese Hot Albums (Billboard Japan)	20
Lithuanian Albums (AGATA)	10
New Zealand Albums (RMNZ)	20
Norwegian Albums (VG-lista)	2
Polish Albums (ZPAV)	25
Scottish Albums (Official Charts)	4
Slovak Albums (ČNS IFPI)	4
Spanish Albums (Promusicae)	8
Swedish Albums (Sverigetopplistan)	7
Swiss Albums (Schweizer Hitparade)	5
UK Albums (Official Charts)	2
US Billboard 200	27

=== Year-end charts ===
Year-end chart performance for Heaven & Hell in 2020
Chart (2020)	Position
Belgian Albums (Ultratop Flanders)	140
Dutch Albums (Album Top 100)	61
French Albums (SNEP)	161
Swiss Albums (Schweizer Hitparade)	83

Year-end chart performance for Heaven & Hell in 2021
Chart (2021)	Position
Austrian Albums (Ö3 Austria)	29
Belgian Albums (Ultratop Flanders)	41
Belgian Albums (Ultratop Wallonia)	82
Danish Albums (Hitlisten)	31
Dutch Albums (Album Top 100)	24
French Albums (SNEP)	98
German Albums (Offizielle Top 100)	63
Hungarian Albums (MAHASZ)	81
Norwegian Albums (VG-lista)	12
Swedish Albums (Sverigetopplistan)	43
Swiss Albums (Schweizer Hitparade)	33
US Billboard 200	186

Year-end chart performance for Heaven & Hell in 2022
Chart (2022)	Position
Belgian Albums (Ultratop Flanders)	122
Belgian Albums (Ultratop Wallonia)	158
French Albums (SNEP)	167

Year-end chart performance for Heaven & Hell in 2023
Chart (2023)	Position
Belgian Albums (Ultratop Flanders)	183
Belgian Albums (Ultratop Wallonia)	196
Hungarian Albums (MAHASZ)	95
Swedish Albums (Sverigetopplistan)	100

== Certifications ==
Certifications and sales for Heaven & Hell
Region	Certification	Certified units/sales
Argentina (CAPIF)	Gold	10,000^{^}
Austria (IFPI Austria)	Gold	7,500^{‡}
Brazil (Pro-Música Brasil)	Platinum	40,000^{‡}
Canada (Music Canada)	Platinum	80,000^{‡}
Denmark (IFPI Danmark)	2× Platinum	40,000^{‡}
Finland (Musiikkituottajat)	3× Platinum	60,000
France (SNEP)	Platinum	100,000^{‡}
Germany (BVMI)	Gold	100,000^{‡}
Italy (FIMI)	Platinum	50,000^{‡}
New Zealand (RMNZ)	Platinum	15,000^{‡}
Norway (IFPI Norway)	7× Platinum	140,000^{‡}
Poland (ZPAV)	3× Platinum	60,000^{‡}
Singapore (RIAS)	Platinum	10,000^{*}
United Kingdom (BPI)	Gold	100,000^{‡}
United States (RIAA)	Platinum	1,000,000^{‡}
^{*} Sales figures based on certification alone.^{^} Shipments figures based on certification alone.^{‡} Sales+streaming figures based on certification alone.

== Release history ==
Release dates and formats for Heaven & Hell
Region	Date	Format(s)	Label	Ref.
Various	September 18, 2020	Digital download; streaming; CD; cassette tape	Atlantic	
Europe	December 18, 2020	LP	Atlantic	
Japan	January 13, 2021	CD	Warner Music Japan	
Various	February 12, 2021	LP	Atlantic	

== See also ==
- List of UK top-ten albums in 2020
- List of UK Album Downloads Chart number ones of the 2020s
