= Madison Love =

American songwriter

- Born: Madison Emiko Love; April 19, 1995 (age 31); Los Angeles, California, U.S.
- Education: New York University
- Occupations: Songwriter; singer
- Relatives: Roger Love (father)
- Musical career
- Genre: Pop
- Label: APG

Madison Emiko Love (born April 19, 1995) is an American songwriter and singer. She is signed to Artist Publishing Group. She has written songs with Madison Beer, Melanie Martinez, Lady Gaga, Selena Gomez, Katy Perry, Pink, Demi Lovato, Camila Cabello, Kesha, Dove Cameron, Ava Max, Anitta, Addison Rae, and Kim Petras.

== Personal life ==
Madison Emiko Love was born and raised in Los Angeles, California. Her father, Roger Love, is a vocal coach. Love moved to New York and started her career writing songs while attending the Clive Davis Institute of Recorded Music at New York University Tisch School of the Arts, where she later graduated. In 2014, Love was featured in the Teen Vogue series, Bryanboy Goes to College.

== Career ==
=== Writing credits ===
Love co-wrote the 2016 song "Bad Things" by Machine Gun Kelly and Camila Cabello, while she was a student at New York University (NYU). Love also co-wrote the 2017 song "Him & I", by G-Eazy and Halsey. "Him & I" peaked at number one on the Billboard Pop Songs Airplay Chart in 2018. Love's first executive produced song was Ava Max's 2018 song "Sweet but Psycho", the latter artist coincidentally collaborated with Love during their time in college and were also friends. The song reached number one in 17 countries including Germany and the United Kingdom, a position it held on the UK Singles Chart for four consecutive weeks.

=== Vocal credits ===
As a vocalist, Love was featured alongside G-Eazy on the track "Mama Always Told Me", "Hurt People" by Two Feet, "Waste Love" by Machine Gun Kelly, "No Filter" by Black Coast, "Waiting For You" by Coyote Kisses, and "I Love You" by Axwell & Ingrosso.

== Writing credits ==
All song credits are adapted from the American Society of Composers, Authors and Publishers's database, unless otherwise noted.

Year	Artist	Song	Album
2026	Dove Cameron	"Silver Screen Baby"	Final Girl
2026	Dove Cameron	"When in Rome"	Final Girl
2026	Dove Cameron	"Hot Girl"	Final Girl
2026	Dove Cameron	"Skin Over Bone"	Final Girl
2026	Dove Cameron	"Immortalized"	Final Girl
2026	Dove Cameron	"Maybe Heaven Is a Jazz Club"	Final Girl
2026	Le Sserafim, Illit & Katseye	"Iconic by Mistake"	Non-album single
2026	Kim Petras	"DTLA"	Detour
2026	Kim Petras	"I Like Ur Look"	Detour
2026	Kim Petras	"Polo"	Detour
2026	Kim Petras	"Need For Speed"	Detour
2026	Kim Petras	"101"	Detour
2026	Kim Petras	"B*tch Ball Out"	Detour
2026	Kim Petras	"Freak it"	Detour
2026	Kim Petras	"Rare & Deluxe"	Detour (Rare & Deluxe)
2026	Kim Petras	"Like a Cherry"	Detour (Rare & Deluxe)
2025	Hilary Duff	"Mature"	Luck... or Something
2025	Thoom	"December Forever"	TBA
2025	Katseye	"Gnarly"	Beautiful Chaos
2025	Mollie Elizabeth	"The Disappearing Girl"	Non-album single
2025	Kesha	"Attention" (feat. Slayyyter & Rose Gray)	Period (Deluxe)
2025	Kesha	"Joyride"	Period
2025	Kesha	"Delusional"	Period
2025	Kesha	"Boy Crazy"	Period
2025	Dove Cameron	"Romeo"	Non-album singles
2025	Dove Cameron	"French Girls"	Non-album singles
2025	Dove Cameron	"Too Much"	Non-album singles
2025	Sorana	"KiSS BACK"	Techno Sexual Even More Sexual
2024	Gwen Stefani	"Somebody Else's"	Bouquet
2024	Gwen Stefani	"Bouquet"	Bouquet
2024	Gwen Stefani	"Pretty"	Bouquet
2024	Gwen Stefani	"Empty Vase"	Bouquet
2024	Gwen Stefani	"Late To Bloom"	Bouquet
2024	Gwen Stefani	"Swallow My Tears"	Bouquet
2024	Alice Longyu Gao	"Clingy"	Assembling Symbols Into My Own Poetry
2024	Suki Waterhouse	"To Get You"	Memoir of a Sparklemuffin
2024	Suki Waterhouse	"Legendary"	Memoir of a Sparklemuffin
2024	David Guetta & Alesso	"Never Going Home Tonight" (feat. Madison Love)	Non-album singles
2024	Leah Kate	"Nasty"	Non-album singles
2024	Leah Kate	"What Girls Do"	Non-album singles
2024	Lauv	"Potential"	Non-album singles
2024	Fletcher	"Ego Talking"	In Search Of The Antidote
2024	Jennifer Lopez	"Midnight Trip to Vegas"	This Is Me... Now
2024	Armin van Buuren & Gryffin	"What Took You So Long"	Breathe and Pulse
2023	Dove Cameron	"God's Game"	Alchemical: Vol. 1
2023	Dove Cameron	"Fragile Things"	Alchemical: Vol. 1
2023	Enhypen	"Sweet Venom"	Orange Blood
2023	David Guetta & Kim Petras	"When We Were Young (The Logical Song)"	Non-album single
2023	(G)-IDLE	"I Want That"	Heat
2023	Leah Kate	"Super Over"	Super Over
2023	Leah Kate	"Space"	Super Over
2023	Leah Kate	"Unbreakup"	Super Over
2023	Leah Kate	"Get In Loser"	Super Over
2023	Leah Kate	"Bored"	Super Over
2023	Leah Kate	"911"	Super Over
2023	Leah Kate	"So Not Sober"	Super Over
2023	Blackpink	"The Girls"	Non-album single
2023	Addison Rae	"I Got It Bad"	AR
2023	Addison Rae	"2 Die 4" (feat. Charli XCX)	AR
2023	Addison Rae	"Nothing On (But the Radio)"	AR
2023	Addison Rae	"Obsessed"	AR
2023	Ava Max	"Choose Your Fighter"	Barbie the Album
2023	Alok & Ava Max	"Car Keys (Ayla)"	Non-album single
2023	Kim Petras	"King of Hearts"	Feed The Beast
2023	Kim Petras	"uhoh"	Feed The Beast
2023	Pink	"Turbulence"	Trustfall
2023	Ava Max	"Hold Up (Wait a Minute)"	Diamonds & Dancefloors
2023	Ava Max	"Weapons"	Diamonds & Dancefloors
2023	Ava Max	"In the Dark"	Diamonds & Dancefloors
2023	Ava Max	"Turn Off the Lights"	Diamonds & Dancefloors
2023	Ava Max	"Get Outta My Heart"	Diamonds & Dancefloors
2023	Ava Max	"Cold as Ice"	Diamonds & Dancefloors
2023	Ava Max	"Last Night on Earth"	Diamonds & Dancefloors
2023	Maneskin	"Gossip" (feat. Tom Morello)	RUSH!
2022	Lu Kala	"Pretty Girl Era"	No Tears On This Ride
2022	Fletcher	"Conversations"	Girl of My Dreams
2022	Fletcher	"F*ckboy"	Girl of My Dreams
2022	Lauv	"Stay Together"	All 4 Nothing
2022	Lauv	"Time After Time"	All 4 Nothing
2022	Mandy Moore	"Heartlands"	In Real Life
2022	Mandy Moore	"Little Victories"	In Real Life
2022	Anitta	"Versions of Me"	Versions of Me
2022	Charli XCX	"Lightning"	Crash
2021	Fletcher	"Girls Girls Girls"	Non-album single
2021	Bebe Rexha	"Trust Fall"	Better Mistakes
2021	Demi Lovato	"Easy" (with Noah Cyrus)	Dancing with the Devil... the Art of Starting Over
2021	Demi Lovato	"My Girlfriends are My Boyfriend" (featuring Saweetie)	Dancing with the Devil... the Art of Starting Over
2021	Bring Me the Horizon	"Die4U"	Post Human 2
2021	Daya	"Bad Girl"	The Difference
2020	Katy Perry	"Teary Eyes"	Smile
2020	Katy Perry	"Not the End of the World"	Smile
2020	Ava Max	"Kings & Queens"	Heaven & Hell
2020	Ava Max	"Torn"	Heaven & Hell
2020	Ava Max	"Who's Laughing Now"	Heaven & Hell
2020	Ava Max	"Sweet but Psycho"	Heaven & Hell
2020	Lady Gaga	"Sour Candy" (with Blackpink)	Chromatica
2020	Selena Gomez	"Rare"	Rare
2020	Selena Gomez	"A Sweeter Place" (featuring Kid Cudi)	Rare
2020	Selena Gomez	"Souvenir"	Rare
2020	Megan Thee Stallion & Normani	"Diamonds"	Birds Of Prey: The Album
2019	Machine Gun Kelly	"Waste Love" (feat. Madison Love)	Hotel Diablo
2019	Kim Petras	"Personal Hell"	Clarity
2019	Kim Petras	"Another One"	Clarity
2019	Ally Brooke	"No Good"	Non-album singles
2019	Ally Brooke	"Lips Don't Lie" (featuring A Boogie wit da Hoodie)	Non-album singles
2019	Zara Larsson	"Wow"	Poster Girl
2018	Arizona	"What She Wants"	What She Wants
2018	Bazzi	"Star"	Cosmic
2018	Benjamin Ingrosso	"Behave"	Identification
2018	Camila Cabello	"In the Dark"	Camila
2018	Niykee Heaton	"Mascara"	Non-album single
2018	Hayley Kiyoko	"Wanna Be Missed"	Expectations
2018	Madison Beer	"Heartless"	As She Pleases
2018	MØ	"Beautiful Wreck"	Forever Neverland
2017	Axwell & Ingrosso	"I Love You"	More Than You Know
2017	Ava Max	"Not Your Barbie Girl"	Non-album single
2017	Madison Beer	"Dead"	As She Pleases
2017	G-Eazy and Halsey	"Him & I"	The Beautiful & Damned
2017	Pitbull and Fifth Harmony	"Por Favor"	Fifth Harmony
2017	Astrid S	"Think Before I Talk"	Leave It Beautiful (Complete)
2017	Jasmine Thompson	"Someone's Somebody"	Wonderland
2017	Baby Ariel	"Aww"	Non-album single
2017	Jeff Lewis	"Friends Are Family"	The Lego Batman Movie (Original Motion Picture Soundtrack)
2017	Greg Pajer, Aris Archontis, Madison Love	"Do You See This"	xXx: Return of Xander Cage (Music from the Motion Picture)
2017	Nicky Blitz	"Walk"	Non-album singles
2017	DJ Vice	"Pinata"	Non-album singles
2017	Wingtip	"Walls" (featuring Delacey)	Non-album singles
2016	Machine Gun Kelly and Camila Cabello	"Bad Things"	Bloom
2016	Coyote Kisses	"Waiting for You" (featuring Madison Love)	Non-album single
2016	Jason Derulo	"Kiss the Sky"	Platinum Hits
2016	Scavenger Hunt	"Slow Dancing"	Shapes and Outlines
2016	Tritonal, Jenaux	"Broken" (featuring Adam Lambert)	Non-album single

=== Vocals ===
Year	Artist	Song	Album
2024	David Guetta & Alesso	"Never Going Home Tonight"	Non-album single
2024	Armin van Buuren & Gryffin	"What Took You So Long"	Breathe and Pulse
2019	Machine Gun Kelly	"Waste Love"	Hotel Diablo
2019	Jax Jones	"Cruel"	Snacks (Supersize)
2018	Black Coast	"No Filter"	Non-album single
2018	Axwell & Ingrosso	"I Love You"	More Than You Know
2018	Two Feet	"Hurt People"	A Twenty Something Fuck
2018	G-Eazy	"Mama Always Told Me"	The Beautiful & Damned

=== Filmography ===
Year	Film	Role
2013	"Begin Again"	Singer Songwriter #1

=== Television shows ===
Year	TV Show	Role	Notes	Ref.
2025	The Simpsons	Kneesocks Singer	Season 37; Episode: "The Day of the Jack-up"	
