= Lion Bear Fox =

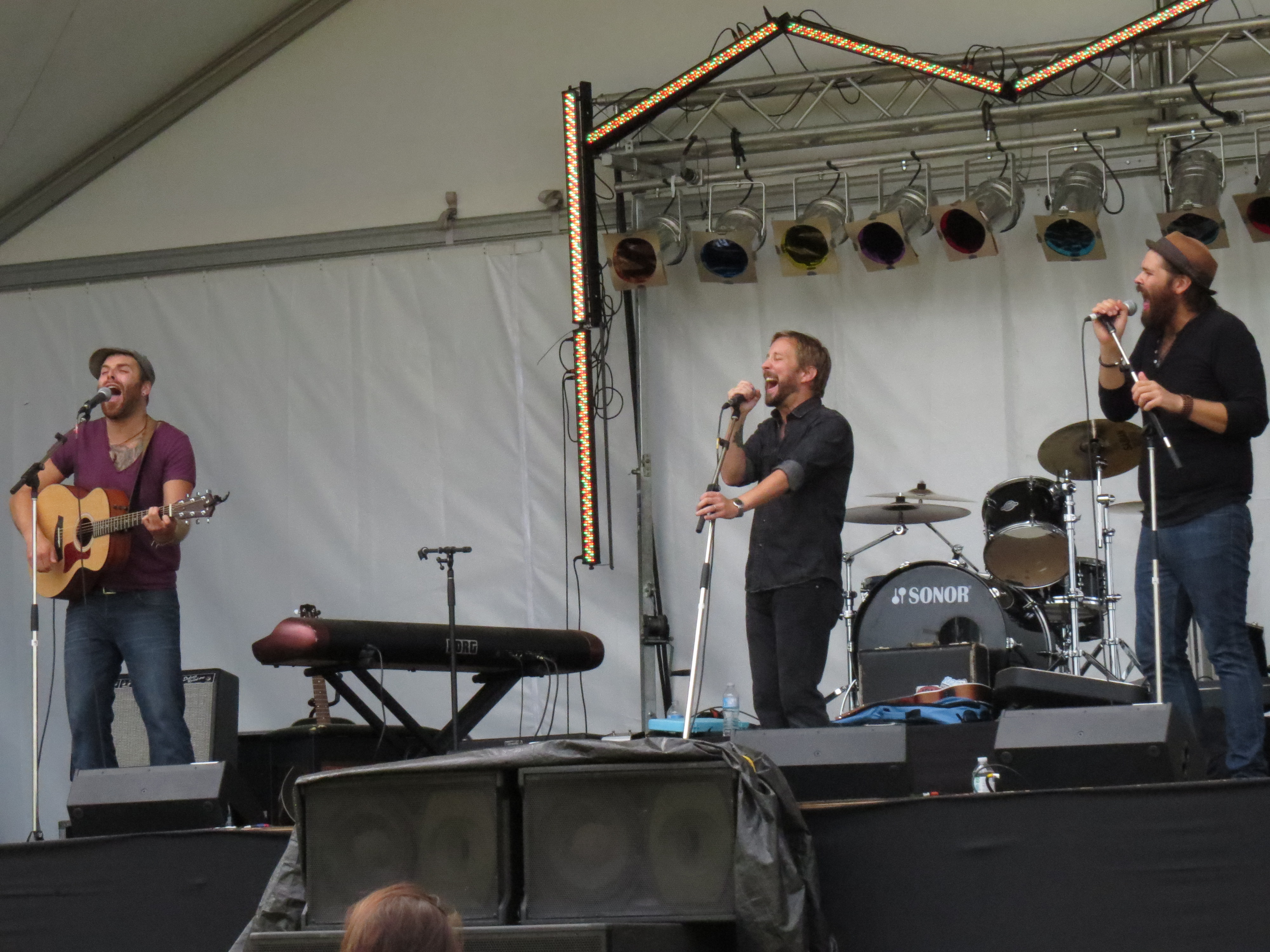
- the lion the bear the fox performs live at the Vancouver Island Exhibition 18 August 2013 in Nanaimo, British Columbia

Background information
- Genres: Folk rock
- Years active: 2012–present
- Members: Christopher Arruda; Cory Woodward; Ryan McMahon
- Website: www.thelionthebearthefox.com

Lion Bear Fox (also sometimes stylized as The Lion The Bear, The Fox or LBF) is a Canadian folk rock band from British Columbia. The band was formed in 2012 by singer-songwriters Christopher Arruda, Cory Woodward and Ryan McMahon. In 2013, Lion Bear Fox was named Top 20 finalist in 102.7 The Peak FM's Peak Performance Project and released its debut self-produced EP "We’d Be Good Men". In February 2017. LBF released its self-titled debut Lion Bear Fox.

== Career ==
=== Formation ===
The lion the bear the fox was formed after Christopher Arruda, Cory Woodward and Ryan McMahon toured together as solo artists in 2012. Following an impromptu performance in Winnipeg, the three musicians began collaborating by joining one another during live performances. "I know I certainly had no interest in starting a band previous to going on the road with these two, but the events of the tour were something that couldn't be ignored," said Arruda. Combined, the singer-songwriters brought more than three decades of musical experience in the project. "All three of us gents have been at this for over 10 years apiece, and I think that for some reason the timing was right," said McMahon. McMahon described the formation of the group as occurring at a critical point in each member’s solo career, with the collaboration developing out of mutual creative support rather than competition.

=== Recording and touring ===
Since forming, the Lion the Bear the Fox has shared the stage with artists such as Lee Harvey Osmond, Elliott BROOD, Kim Mitchell, and The Steel Wheels.

"When we perform, people experience three powerful, honest and soulful voices that will take them on a roller coaster ride of dynamically pleasing songs," said Woodward. He then added that the band aimed to create an inclusive atmosphere that encouraged audiences to dance, sing, and engage with the music together.

The Lion the Bear the Fox released its debut EP "We'd Be Good Men" on October 8th 2013. The EP featured six original songs and a coved of Ray LaMontagne's "Henry Nearly Killed Me (It's A Shame)," the album was produced and mixed by Arruda and Woodward and mastered by 2013 Juno Award nominee Joby Baker of Victoria.

Woodward later stated that the recording process involved "guerrilla- style" sessions across more than 30 locations. " I've learned so much about common recording techniques and have had a blast creating my own. All of this has added a certain honesty to the record, a lovability that has made me happy to say it's the best record I've been a part of to date. I look forward to the next one immensely."

== Members ==
- The Lion: Christopher Arruda - vocals, organ, percussion
- The Bear: Cory Woodward - vocals, guitar, bass, percussion
- The Fox: Ryan McMahon - vocals, guitar, percussion

== The Bandwagon Project ==
In the fall of 2013, LBF entered into a partnership with the Vancouver, British Columbia-based charitable foundation Music Heals to raise funding for the Bandwagon Project. The project draws its name from a mobile recording studio named the Bandwagon, which is specifically designed for music therapists to use with critically and terminally ill patients. Items used in the Bandwagon include microphones, instruments, a computer, and recording software. Funds raised would allow for the band to bring the studio to Vancouver Island hospitals for the first time.

The project was inspired by Megan McNeil from North Delta, British Columbia, an adrenal cancer patient that had been battling the disease since she was 16 before dying at 20 years old. McNeil wrote a song called "The Will to Survive" as a tribute to other children fighting cancer, and McMahon helped McNeil arrange and record her song in 2010. Of McNeil's influence on the project, McMahon stated that "Megan's 'Will to Survive' song, video, and entire campaign wouldn't have seen the light if not for music therapy". Currently there is one stationary Bandwagon at British Columbia Children's Hospital and one that travels around Greater Vancouver for six-week residencies.

== Discography ==
- We'd Be Good Men (2013)
- Lion Bear Fox (2017)
