= Roger Love =

American vocal coach

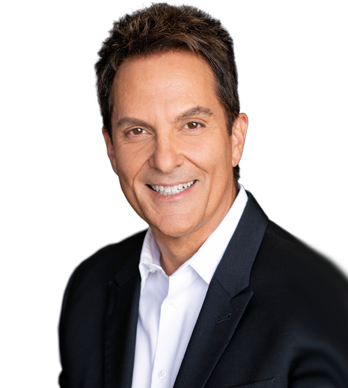
Roger Love

Roger Love is an American vocal coach based in Los Angeles who has worked with many singers, actors and public speakers.

== Career ==
Love took his first singing lessons when he was 13 years old. By 16 or 17 he studied vocal pedagogy in Seth Riggs's studio. He became a junior partner in the studio but soon founded his own studio and took some of Riggs's clients. He was initially interested in a career in opera, but developed a passion for working with pop musicians after coaching The Beach Boys, Chicago, and The 5th Dimension. Today he owns Voice Place Inc.

Love is notable for working with Gwen Stefani, Selena Gomez, John Mayer, and Eminem.

Love has worked as a vocal consultant on major Hollywood films including A Star Is Born (2018), Crazy Heart, Southland Tales, Walk the Line, and Begin Again; coaching actors such as Keira Knightley, Reese Witherspoon, Joaquin Phoenix, and Bradley Cooper. Many of them have won Grammy Award, Screen Actors Guild Awards, and Academy Awards after working with Love.

Love has been a featured cast member on TV shows such as Popstars (WB), Rock Star INXS (CBS), Sing Your Face Off (ABC) and ENCORE (Disney+).

Love has also developed a method for increasing clarity and confidence when speaking, and has coached executives and personalities including Tony Robbins and Tyra Banks.

== Method ==
Love's vocal method focuses on diaphragmatic breathing, daily vocal exercises, and bridging the head voice and chest voice via the “middle voice”. Love analyzes his clients’ voices by asking them to sing a musical scale that includes very low and very high notes.

== Personal life ==
Love was born around 1960–1961 in Los Angeles in a Jewish working-class family. He started singing in a Synagogue Temple Beth Am guided by the Cantor Allan Michelson. Later he worked and a fill-in cantor at Burbank Temple Emanu El. Love is married to Miyoko Love and has two children Madison Emiko Love, a Japanese-American songwriter and vocalist, and Colin Makoto Love. Love lives in Los Angeles and owns a dog, Gigi.

Love has been featured in the Los Angeles Times and HuffPost, and on Larry King Now, Rachael Ray and Nightline.

== Works and credits ==
=== Bibliography ===
- Love, Roger (1999). Set Your Voice Free. Little, Brown and Company.
- Love, Roger (2003). Sing Like the Stars!. Pocket Books/MTV Books.
- Love, Roger (2007). Love Your Voice: Use Your Speaking Voice to Create Success, Self-Confidence, and Star-Like Charisma!. Hay House.
- Love, Roger (2007). Roger Love's Vocal Power: Speaking with Authority, Clarity and Conviction (Your Coach In a Box) (Audio Book). Nightingale-Conant.
- Love, Roger (2014). Vocal Power: Speaking with Authority, Clarity, and Conviction (Audio Book). Nightingale-Conant.

=== Discography ===
Year	Title	Role	Notes
1985	Jeff Berlin: Champion	vocals: Champion (Of The World)	
1991	X Japan: Jealousy	vocal coach, vocal producer, backing vocals: Desperate Angel	
1991	Susie Hatton: Body and Soul	backing vocals	
1991	Stevie Nicks: Timespace: The Best of Stevie Nicks	backing vocals: Love's A Hard Game To Play	
1993	X Japan: Art of Life	vocal coach	
1995	Def Leppard: Vault: Def Leppard Greatest Hits (1980–1995)	backing vocals: When Love & Hate Collide	
1996	X Japan: Dahlia	vocal coach	
1997	Hanson: Middle of Nowhere	vocal director	
2003	Aja Daashuur: Before the Beginning	A&R	
2005	Lorene Drive: Romantic Wealth	vocal coach	
2009	John Mayer: Battle Studies	vocal consultant	
2012	John Mayer: Born and Raised	vocal consultant	

=== Filmography ===
Year	Title	Role	Notes
1984	Grandview, U.S.A.	performed: Nightpulse	
1984	I Married a Centerfold	vocal consultant	TV movie
2005	Walk the Line	Vocal coach: Reese Witherspoon and Joaquin Phoenix	
2006	Southland Tales	vocal coach: Sarah Michelle Gellar	
2008	Repo! The Genetic Opera	vocal coach	
2009	Crazy Heart	vocal coach: Jeff Bridges and Colin Farrell	
2014	Annie	vocal coach: Quvenzhané Wallis	
2018	A Star Is Born	vocal coach: Bradley Cooper	
