= Megan McNeil =

Canadian singer

- Born: September 7, 1990
- Origin: North Delta, British Columbia, Canada
- Died: January 28, 2011 (aged 20)
- Genres: Pop music
- Occupations: Singer and vocalist
- Years active: 2008–2010

Megan McNeil (September 7, 1990 – January 28, 2011) was a Canadian singer. The only child of Dave and Suzanne McNeil, she was diagnosed in 2006 with adrenalcortical carcinoma, a rare type of adrenal cancer when she was 16 years old.

She studied at Seaquam Secondary and graduated in 2008. She also attended Kwantlen Polytechnic University in Surrey for Sciences. She beat cancer back three times, but succumbed during her fourth battle, at the age of 20.

== "The Will to Survive" ==
"The Will to Survive"

Single by Megan McNeil
- Released: 2011
- Recorded: 2010
- Genre: Pop
- Songwriter: Megan McNeil
- Producer: Garth Richardson

Music video
- "The Will to Survive" on YouTube

McNeil gained media attention when she recorded a charity single written by her entitled The Will to Survive as a tribute to tens of thousands of cancer-fighting children and youth. The lyrics include:

Here's to the fight

Here's to the fighters
Here's to the brave that take this on
Here's to the lost souls
Here's to the new hope

We'll keep on keeping on

Megan McNeil wrote the lyrics in 2006 just 2 months after being diagnosed with cancer. The song was recorded in 2010 at Nimbus School of Recording Arts with producer Garth Richardson. The song was arranged by Ryan McMahon. A music video was shot by director Tash Baycroft. The proceeds from the single went to childhood cancer organizations.

== Death ==
She died on January 28, 2011, aged 20.

== Popular media ==
- McNeil's story touched millions across Canada and the United States through many media appearances in promoting childhood cancer awareness and such charities as The British Columbia Childhood Cancer Parents' Association (BCCCPA) and The James Fund. McNeil appeared in features in Europe as well.
- Canada AM selected McNeil's story one of the best of 2010
- CBC News selected hers as the most inspirational story of the year in Canada

== Discography ==
- 2010: "The Will to Survive"
