= Obsessed (Addison Rae song) =

2021 single by Addison Rae

Single by Addison Rae

from the EP AR (Spotify version)
- Released: March 19, 2021
- Recorded: October 2020
- Genre: Dance-pop
- Length: 2:14
- Label: Sandlot
- Composers: Ryan McMahon; Benjamin Levin; Blake Slatkin
- Lyricists: Addison Rae Easterling; Tia Scola; Madison Love; Brett McLaughlin; Jacob Kasher Hindlin
- Producers: McMahon; Benny Blanco; Slatkin

Addison Rae singles chronology
"Obsessed" (2021)	"Diet Pepsi" (2024)

Music video
- "Obsessed" on YouTube

"Obsessed" is the debut single by American singer Addison Rae, released on March 19, 2021, through Sandlot Records. The song debuted and peaked at number ten on the US Billboard's Bubbling Under Hot 100 chart.

The song was originally intended to be the lead single from Rae's scrapped debut album. An extended play consisting of 4 unreleased tracks, titled AR, was later officially released on August 18, 2023, with "Obsessed" appearing as a Spotify-exclusive bonus track.

== Background ==
Rae initially made a name for herself as a social media personality, having created her TikTok account in the summer of 2019. In October 2019, she reached one million followers on the platform. Around Thanksgiving that year, she dropped out of Louisiana State University, where she was studying broadcast journalism, and moved to Los Angeles with her mother Sheri Nicole Easterling. In December that year, she became one of the co-founders of The Hype House.

Despite her success as a TikToker, a month before COVID-19 lockdown, Rae told talent managers Justin Greenberg and Joe Izzi about her desire to act, sing and dance. Greenberg and Izzi helped her land a role in Netflix's He's All That (2021), which would turn out to be a critical failure but a commercial success. The managers also booked her first songwriting sessions, with Rae herself starting acting and singing classes.

== Production and composition ==
Preceding the release, Rae worked with songwriter Jacob Kasher Hindlin to study songwriting. Rae released the song through Hindlin's independent label, Sandlot Records. "Obsessed" was produced by Benny Blanco and co-written by Rae herself. They worked with manager Adam Mersel, and publicists Katie Greenthal and Courtni Asbury of The Lede Company. After four months in the Hindlin's studio, Rae and her team developed most of "Obsessed" in one session.

"Obsessed" is a dance-pop song. The lyrics are about a relationship and self-hate, with the tongue-in-cheek chorus "I'm obsessed with me-e-e as much as you." At a young age, Rae was influenced by her mother's playlist which included music from the 1990s and 2000s. In an interview with Vogue, Rae identifies Beyoncé, Jennifer Lopez, Britney Spears, and Katy Perry as musical influences. She cited Taylor Swift as an inspiration for the song.

== Critical reception ==
"Obsessed" was critically panned; in a review for PopDust, music critic Langa stated "Addison Rae's embarrassing new single 'Obsessed' proves she should stick to lip syncing". Zoe Haylock of Vulture negatively compared Rae's use of whispering to Selena Gomez. Writing for Entertainment Weekly, Nick Romano described the lyrics as "[reading] more like a text exchange", while assuming the message was "about how obsessed [Rae] is with herself", in contrast with what Rae intended, writing "the execution may have gotten lost in translation".

Writing for British Vogue in 2023, Amel Mukhtar described "Obsessed" as "fabulously camp" and wondered: "Was it shallow trash, or tongue-in-cheek art?" The same year, Rae revealed to American Vogue that the criticism she received from the song almost made her quit music entirely, as it made her believe that she wasn't good enough for the industry. In a 2024 interview with Rolling Stone, she told Brittany Spanos: "I still think that song's good. I think there's room for constructive criticism. [But] it almost wasn't even about the song. It was [about] me doing it."

== Commercial performance ==
In the United States, the song debuted at its peak of number 10 on the Bubbling Under Hot 100 chart issue dated April 3, 2021, which serves as a twenty-five slot extension to the main Billboard Hot 100.

== Music video ==
The music video, directed by Diane Martel, includes dances choreographed by Sara Biv and Calvit Hodge. On the day of its release, the single was the sixth video trending on YouTube. Kyle Luu was the stylist. In parts of the video, Rae wore catsuits by LaQuan Smith, clothing by Mugler and a fake fur Gucci bolero. Her white Dion Lee corset was inspired by the Britney Spears' music video for "Sometimes". The catsuit was influenced by the music video of "Say You'll Be There" by the Spice Girls.

== Live performances ==
Rae performed "Obsessed" on The Tonight Show Starring Jimmy Fallon, marking her debut appearance on a late-night talk show. She released accompanying clothing and poster merchandise. The song featured in the setlist of her debut concert The Addison Tour in 2025.

== Charts ==
Chart performance for "Obsessed"
Chart (2021)	Peak position
Canada Hot 100 (Billboard)	74
Ireland (IRMA)	64
New Zealand Hot Singles (RMNZ)	15
UK Indie Breakers (OCC)	9
US Bubbling Under Hot 100 (Billboard)	10

== Release history ==
Release history for "Obsessed"
Country	Date	Format	Label	Ref.
Various	March 19, 2021	Digital download; streaming	Sandlot	
United States	March 30, 2021	Contemporary hit radio	Sandlot	
