= Rock music in Hungary =

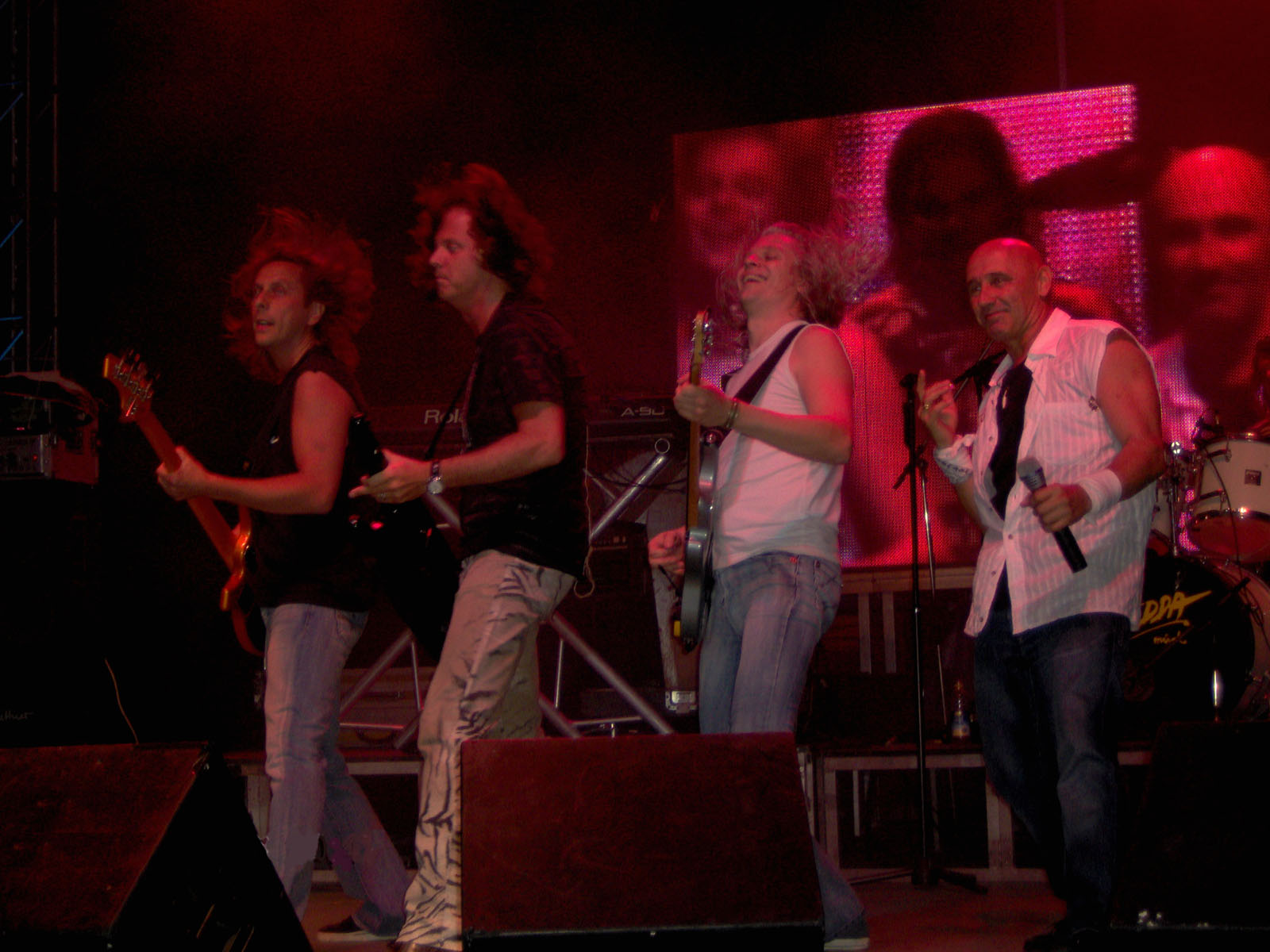
Edda

Hungarian rock has been a part of the popular music of Hungary since the early 1960s. The first major bands were Illés, Metró and Omega. At the time, rock was not approved of by the Hungarian Communist authorities. In the 1970s, the Communists cracked down on rock, and Illés was banned from recording. Some members of the other bands formed a supergroup called Locomotiv GT, while the band Omega became very popular in Germany.

== History ==
=== 1960s ===
In 1968, the New Economic Mechanism was introduced, intending on revitalizing the Hungarian economy, while the band Illés won almost every prize at the prestigious Táncdalfesztivál. In the 70s, however, the Russians cracked down on subversives in Hungary, and rock was a major target. The band Illés was banned from performing and recording, while Metró and Omega left. Some of the members of these bands formed a supergroup, Locomotiv GT, that quickly became very famous. The remaining members of Omega, meanwhile, succeeded in achieving stardom in Germany, and remained very popular for a time.

=== 1970s ===
Rock bands in the late 1970s had to conform to the Record Company's demands and ensure that all songs passed the inspection of the Song Committee, who scoured all songs looking for ideological disobedience. LGT was the most prominent band of a classic rock style that was very popular, along with Illés, Bergendy and Zorán, while there were other bands like The Sweet and Middle of the Road who catered to the desires of the Song Committee, producing rock-based pop music without a hint of subversion. Meanwhile, the disco style of electronic music produced such performers as the officially sanctioned Neoton Familia, and Beatrice and Szűcs Judit, while the more critically acclaimed progressive rock scene produced bands like East, V73, Color and Panta Rhei.also born of the Apostol band.

=== 1980s ===
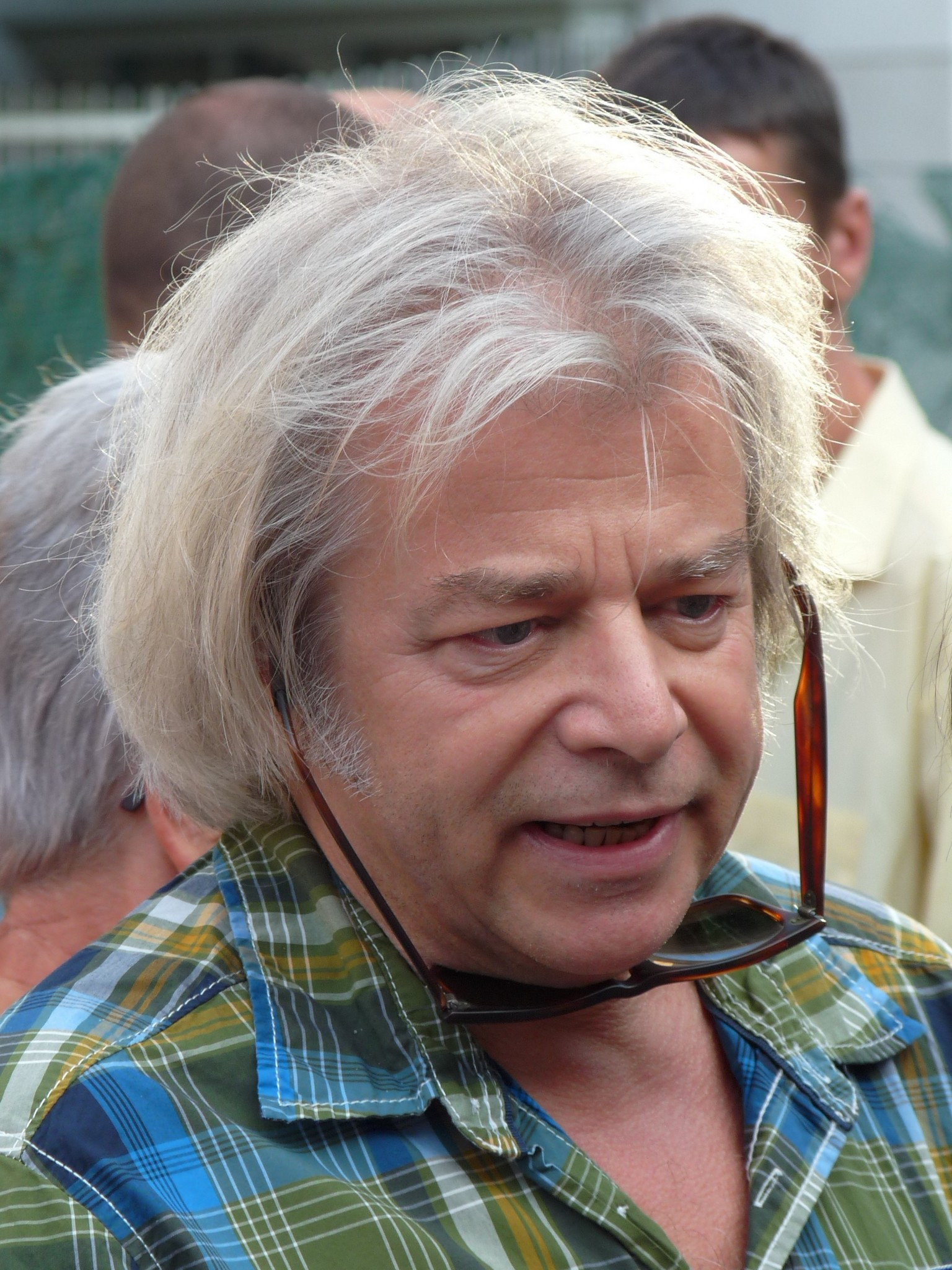
Tamás Somló of Lokomotiv GT

In the early 1980s, economic and cultural depression wracked Hungary, leading to a wave of disillusioned and alienated youth, rock's main demographic, and the burgeoning worldwide field of punk rock, spoke to the most. Major bands from this era included Beatrice, who had moved from disco to punk and folk-influenced rock and were known for their splashy, uncensored and theatrical performances, P. Mobil, Bikini, Hobo Blues Band, a bluesy duo, A. E. Bizottság, Európa Kiadó, Sziámi and Edda Művek.

The 1980s saw the Record Production Company broken up because Hungary's authorities realized that restricting rock was not effective in reducing its effect; they instead tried to water it down by encouraging young musicians to sing about the principles of Communism and obedience. The early part of the decade saw the arrival of punk and new wave music in full force, and the authorities quickly incorporated those styles as well. The first major prison sentences for rock-related subversion were given out, with the members of the punk band CPg sentenced to two years for political incitement.

=== 1990s ===
By the end of the decade and into the 1990s, internal problems made it impossible for the Hungarian government to counter the activities of rock and other musical groups. After the collapse of the Communist government, the Hungarian scene become more and more like the styles played in the rest of Europe.

=== 2000s ===
The 2000s see the emergence of new different genres, while the classic rock remained in the background. Several metal bands, such as FreshFabrik, Blind Myself, and Superbutt, reached international success.

== Subgenres ==
=== Alternative ===
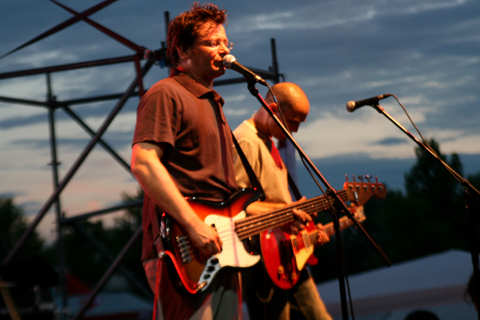
Kispál és a Borz playing at the VOLT Festival

Hungarian alternative band Kispál és a Borz emerged in the early 1990s. They became famous for their lead singer's (András Lovasi) lyrics and unique style of singing.

As one of few underground bands, Attila Grandpierre's Vágtázó Halottkémek (in English Galloping Coroners) reached measurable international recognition with their fusion of tribal rhythms with hardcore punk rock.

In 1990 Pál Utcai Fiúk's first studio album was released titled Ha Jön Az Álom. Later the band became of the most well-known alternative rock band in Hungary. Their most widely known albums are A Bál (1991), A Nagy Rohanás (1992), Szerelemharc (1993), Szajhák és Partizánok (1994), Ha Jön Az Élet (2000), Közönséges (2004), and Legelő (2008).

In 1991 Kispál és a Borz's first studio album was released titled Naphoz Holddal. Later the band became the most successful alternative rock band in Hungary. Their most notable albums are Föld Kaland Ilyesmi, Ágy, Asztal, Tévé, Sika, Kasza, Léc, Ül, Bálnák Ki A Partra. The band became noted for their singer András Lovasi's unique style of lyrics.

In 1993 Quimby's first record was released titled A Sip of Story. Later the band became one of the leading bands of the Hungarian alternative scene. Their most famous albums are Jerrycan Dance (1995), Majom-tangó (1996), Diligramm (1997), Ékszerelmére (1999), Káosz Amigos (2002), Kilégzés (2005), Lármagyűjtögető (2009), Kicsi Ország (2010) and Instant Szeánsz (2011).

In 1992 Nulladik Változat released their first studio album with the eponymous title.

In 1995 Sexepil reached international markets with their song Jerusalem which was aired on Music Television's alternative program.

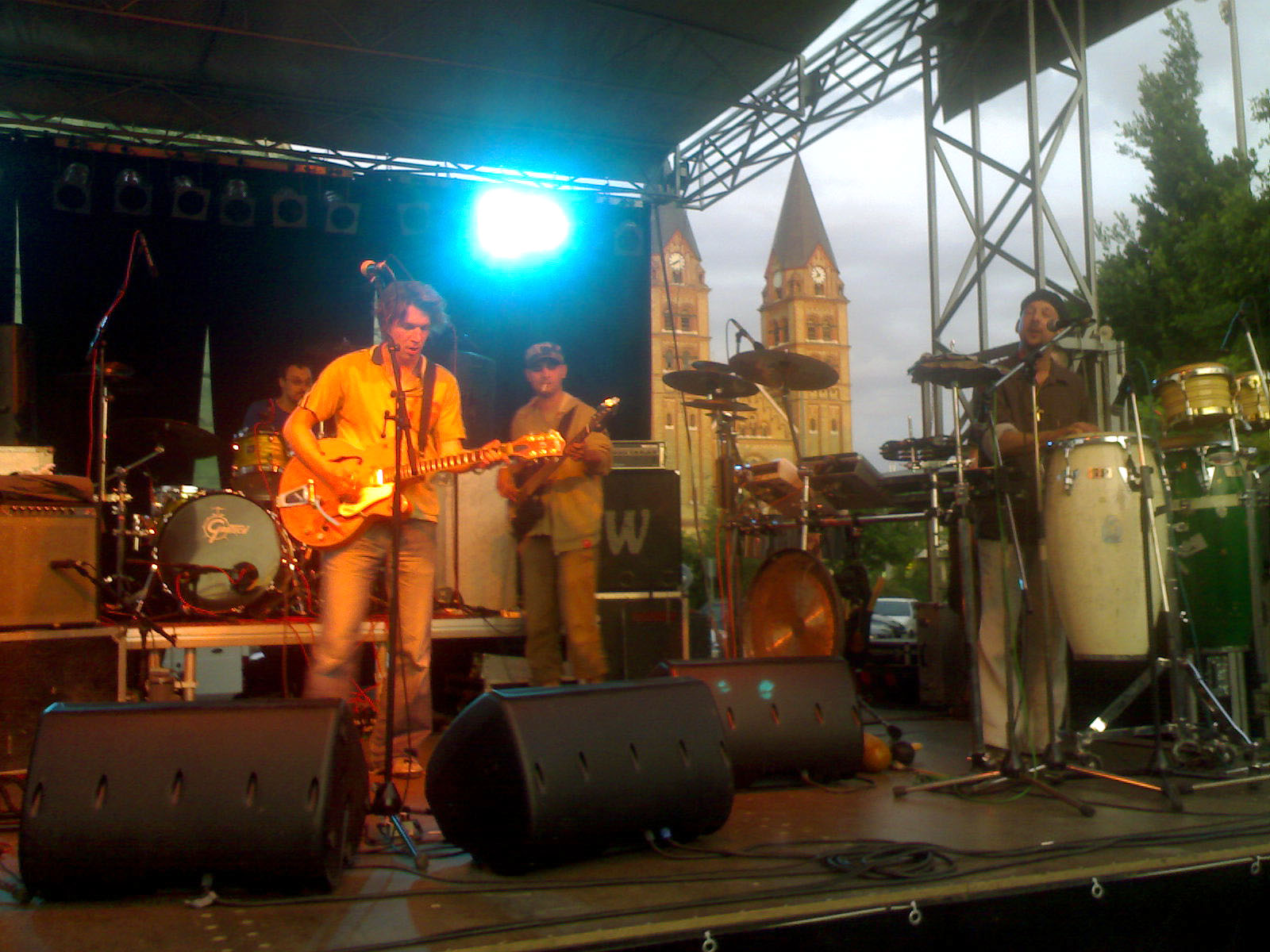
Quimby playing in Nyíregyháza

In 1996 Nulladik Változat released their second studio album titled Négy. The album contained the song Hajnal which brought success for the band in the Hungarian underground scene. In 1997 C.A.F.B.'s second studio album, Zanza, was released by Premier Art Records. The album included the hit single Engedj Be.

In 1998 Land of Charon released their first full-length studio album titled Asztrálgép. The album included songs like Az Önmegváltó, Ishtar és Kthulu, Álmok Romjai and many more.

In 1998 Heaven Street Seven's first studio album was released titled Hip-hop Mjúzik. Later the band released several other records both in Hungarian and in English but they became noted in Hungary as one of the leading bands of the Hungarian alternative music scene. Their most notable albums are Hol Van Az A Krézi Srác? (2000), Sajnálom (2000), White lies in HiFi (2000), Mozdulj! (2001), Éjszaka (2002), Ezután (2002), Dél-Amerika (2002), Csízbörger (2004), Ez A Szerelem (2004), Hangerő (2005), Tudom, hogy Szeretsz Titokban (2007), Mikor Utoljára Láttalak (2008), Szia (2009). The band's singer Krisztián Szűcs also appeared on Yonderboi's Splendid Isolation as a singer.

In 2000 Nulladik Változat's fifth studio album was released titled Murmuc.

In 2000 Yonderboi released his first full-length studio album titled Shallow and Profound. Later Yonderboi became one of the leading artist of the Hungarian electro scene releasing two more records, Splendid Isolation and Passive Control.

In the early 2000s more alternative bands emerged. The Idoru reached international success, signing a contract with Burning Seasons Records.

In 2011 Nulladik Változat released their first album in the 2010s titled Dark, two years later Darker.

In September 2012 the Drum & Monkey Records released Ivan & The Parazol's first album titled Mama Don't You Recognize Ivan & The Parazol?.

=== Indie-rock ===
==== Beginnings ====
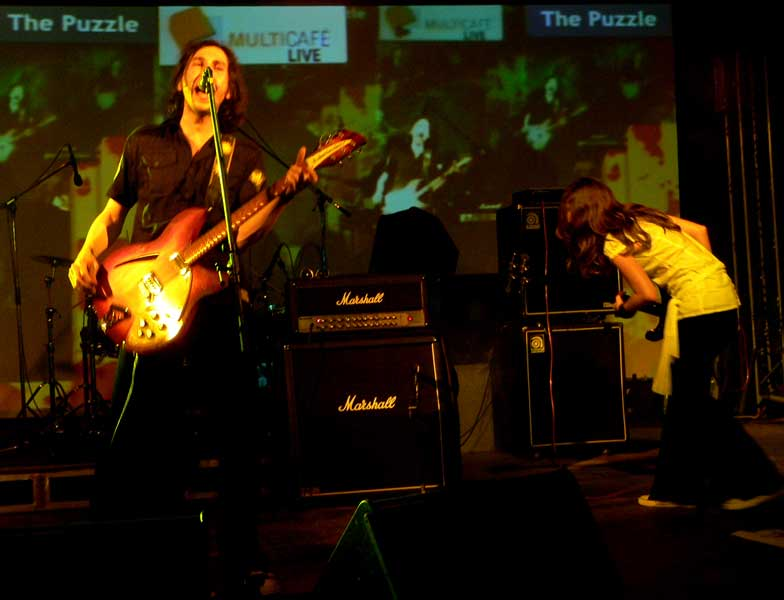
The Puzzle, one of the early birds of the Hungarian indie generation

The early 2000s was the revival of the indie music scene all over the world which obviously affected Hungary as well. One of the earliest Hungarian band playing indie rock were The Puzzle from Kaposvár. They were the first band whose record, titled Dream Your Life, was released by an international label, PolyGram in 2000.

==== Successes ====
On 10 March 2006, Amber Smith's third studio album, RePRINT, was released by the German Kalinkaland Records. The album included the song Hello Sun which brought the band international recognition.

On 10 April 2007, The Moog's first full-length studio album Sold for Tomorrow was released by the American label MuSick. The song I Like You brought international success for the band.

On 18 February 2008, Amber Smith's fourth studio album was released titled Introspective. The album included songs like Introspective, Select All/Delete All, and Coded.

On 21 July 2009, The Moog's second studio album was released titled Razzmatazz Orfeum. The first single, You Raised A Vampire, was released in colored vinyl 7" with stunning artwork by Gris Grimly. The 7" also includes a B-side cover of the Bauhaus classic The Passion Of Lovers featuring Bauhaus/Love and Rockets bassist/vocalist David J, who became a fan of the band after seeing them perform in Hollywood, Los Angeles, California in 2008. The video for You Raised A Vampire was shot in the same gothic building where the first Underworld movie was made in Budapest, Hungary where.

The 2010s saw the emergence of new indie bands such as Carbovaris and Bastiaan, which is the side-project of The Moog singer Tamás Szabó.

==== Decline ====
The decline of the Hungarian indie started in the 2010s, although the most notable bands such as Amber Smith, The Moog and EZ Basic did not disband. From the 2010s two new bands, Carbovaris and Fran Palermo, started to take over the Hungarian indie scene, however, with moderate success. These bands did not attract such a big audience as Amber Smith or The Moog could in the mid 2000s. The decline can also be attributed to the fact that Imre Poniklo, singer-guitarist of Amber Smith, started several projects in the 2010s, such as The Poster Boy, SALT III., and Krapulax & Bellepomme. Therefore, one of the most important bands did not play at concerts which lower their popularity. In addition, the Indie rock genre also experienced a decline all over the world which obviously affected the Hungarian indie scene.

On 10 April 2012 The Moog released their third studio album titled Seasons in the Underground produced by Ken Scott followed by US tour with bands like B-52s and David Lane. The Moog concentrated on their US carrier with moderate success.

On 21 April 2012 Amber Smith released their fifth studio album titled Amber Smith. Although Poniklo claimed that this record is one of the best ones among the previous releases, the band did not achieve those sorts of successes as with the previous records.

On 29 November 2013, Amber Smith released their EP titled Another Way including two new songs: Another Way and Merciful Sea.

== Notable Hungarian rock bands and artists ==
- 30Y
- Ács, Oszkár
- A. E. Bizottság
- Ákos
- Amber Smith
- Auróra
- Balla, Máté
- Bankrupt
- Bastiaan
- Báthory, Zoltán
- Beatrice
- Bikini
- C.A.F.B.
- Carbonfools, The
- Carbovaris
- Computerchemist
- CPg
- Csillag, Endre
- Daczi, Zsolt
- Dawnstar
- Demjén, Ferenc
- Depresszió
- Edda Művek
- Európa Kiadó
- EZ Basic
- FreshFabrik
- Galloping Coroners (Vágtázó Halottkémek)
- Gemini
- Hard
- Heaven Street Seven
- Idoru, The
- Illés
- Ivan & The Parazol
- Karthago
- Kati Kovács
- Kispál és a Borz
- Kolin, The
- Kőváry, Zoltán
- Kukovecz, Gábor
- Lokomotiv GT
- Metró
- Mighty Fishers, The
- Nagy, Dávid
- Nagy, Feró
- Omega
- Paksi, Endre
- Perjés, Péter
- Pokolgép
- Poniklo, Imre
- Quimby
- Republic
- Road
- Rudán, Joe
- Schram, Dávid (recording producer)
- Sexepil
- Silver Shine, The
- Solaris
- Supersonic
- Szabó, Tamás
- Szakácsi, Gábor
- Szarvas, Árpád
- Moog, The
- Neoton Família
- Panta Rhei
- Poniklo
- The Poster Boy
- Puzzle, The
- Takács, Zoltán (recording producer)
- Tankcsapda
- Téglás, Zoltán
- Trousers, The
- Vangel, Tibor
- Vikidál, Gyula
- Warpigs
- We Are Rockstars
- Yesterdays
- Zorán

== Notable & recent Hungarian rock records ==
- 10 000 Lépés
- Amber Smith
- Bummm!
- Éjszakai Országút
- Heavy Medal
- Hello Heavy
- Introspective
- Locomotiv GT
- Locomotiv GT V.
- Mindenki
- Mindig magasabbra
- Razzmatazz Orfeum
- rePRINT
- Ringasd el magad
- Seasons in the Underground
- Sold for Tomorrow
- Sugar for the Soul
- Totális Metál
- Zene - Mindenki másképp csinálja
- Your Scream Is Music
