= Rádió Rock 95.8 =

Coordinates: 47.49185709844787°N 18.97934866622261°E

Budapest; Hungary
- Frequency: 95.8 FM

Programming
- Language: Hungarian
- Format: Rock music

Ownership
- Owner: Favorit Masters Kft.

History
- First air date: 17 May 2016
- Last air date: 1 February 2019

Links
- Website: Official website

Rádió Rock 95.8 was a Hungarian rock music radio station. It was the only radio station in Hungary which broadcast rock music exclusively.

== History ==
On 17 May 2016, the Rádió Rock began broadcasting. The radio station aimed to gain 2,5 million listeners therefore it is available online as well. On February 1, 2019, the broadcast was terminated and Slager FM took the frequency.

Rádió Rock's main principle is to give possibility to the Hungarian rock, Hungarian alternative, indie and metal music scenes.

Hungarian metal bands like The Idoru, Ektomorf, FreshFabrik could debut in a Hungarian radio station for the first time.

The radio station also airs songs by Hungarian alternative bands such as Heaven Street Seven, The Trousers and Ivan and The Parazol, C.A.F.B., Warpigs which were excluded from other Hungarian radio stations.

The Budapest indie music scene was also given the possibility to be aired by Rádió Rock 95.8 including bands like Dawnstar.

== Ownership ==
Rádió Rock is owned by István Vörös and Gábor Németh.

== Sources ==
- Rádió Rock 95.8 - Official Website
