= Hello Sun =

Single by Amber Smith

from the album RePRINT
- Released: November 21, 2005
- Recorded: May – September 2004 at Akustair and Fenn-Ti Studios, Budapest
- Genre: Indie rock
- Length: 3:35 (album version); 2:45 (single version)
- Label: Kalinkaland
- Songwriter: Imre Poniklo
- Producers: Robin Guthrie and Amber Smith

Amber Smith singles chronology
"There Is No Way" (2001)	"Hello Sun" (2005)	"Sea Eyes" (2006)

Music video
- "Hello Sun" on YouTube

"Hello Sun" is a song by the Hungarian indie rock band Amber Smith. It is the second track and lead single from the band's third album, RePRINT (2005), released on CD single by Kalinkaland Records and on vinyl by Phoebe Records. Written by Imre Poniklo, the song uses a verse-chorus form.

== Track listings ==
=== 7": Kalinkaland ===
1. "Hello Sun" – 3:12
2. "Sea Eyes" (remix) – 4:22
3. "Pete and Julie" - 3:12
4. "RePRINT" - 4:23

== Credits and personnel ==
- Credits for Hello Sun adapted from Discogs.

Performance

- Oszkár Ács - bass
- Bence Bátor - drums
- Zoltán Kőváry - guitars
- Imre Poniklo – vocals and guitars

Technical

- Amber Smith - producer
- Imre Poniklo – composer
- Robin Guthrie – mixer
- Jácint Jiling - master
