= The Carbonfools =

Hungarian pop band

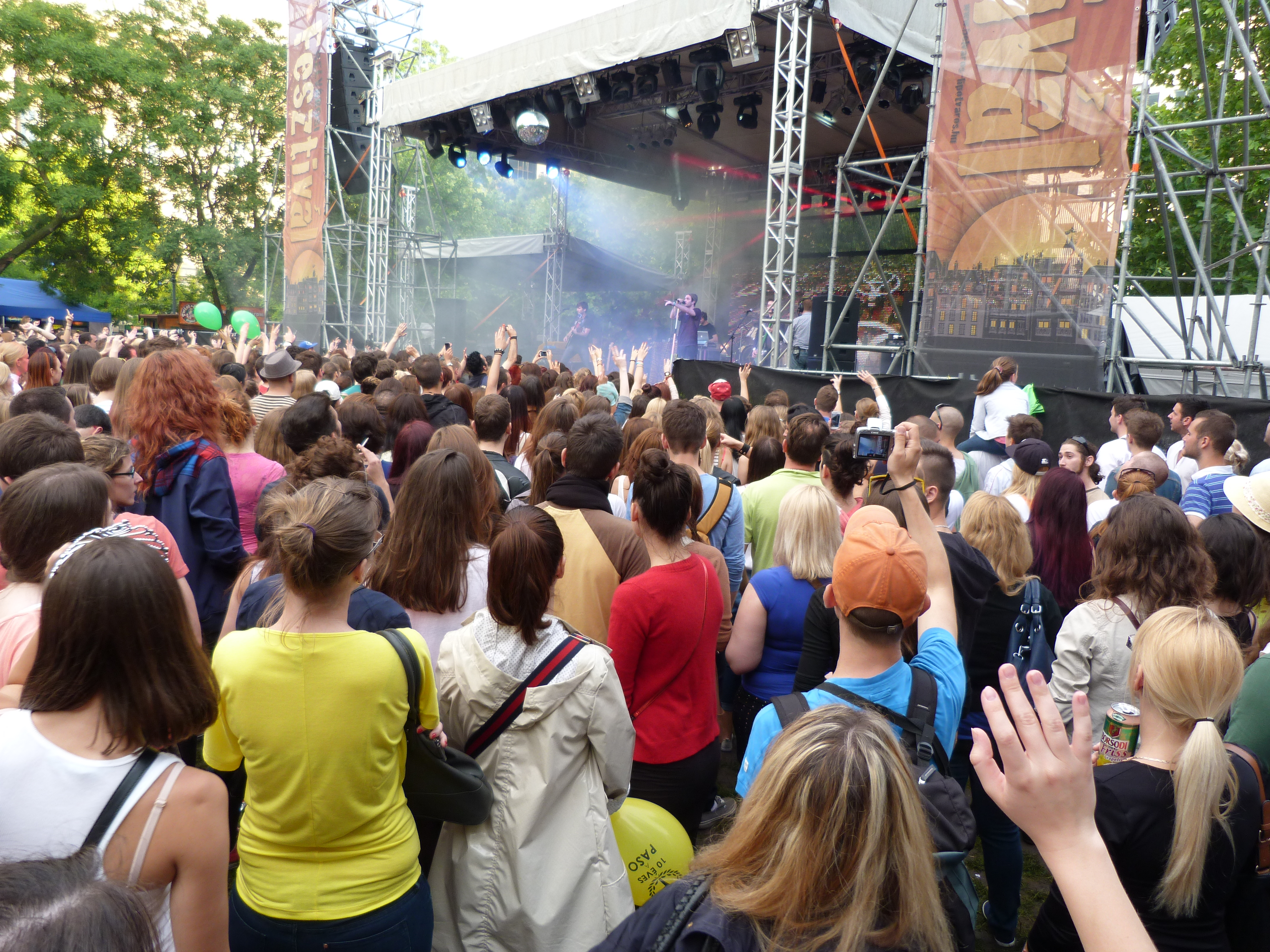

Background information
- Origin: Budapest, Hungary
- Genres: Alternative rock
- Years active: 2001-present
- Members: Titusz Bicskei; Milán Miklós; Gábor Fóris-Ferenczi; Benedek Hámori; Barna Gulyás
- Past members: Szabolcs Tóth; Balázs Fehér; István Fekete; Tamás Keleti
- Website: www.carbonfools.com/

The Carbonfools is a Hungarian pop band from Budapest, Hungary. Formed in 2001, the band started its journey for national fame with its debut at the Sziget Festival. The band mixes genres such as rock, blues, reggae, disco, folk, and darkwave to create their unique sound. In 2004, their first album Poisoned Goulash became a major hit, gathering their previously performed tracks. The Carbonfools is the most popular pop band of the 2000s in Hungary. The Carbonfools also played several shows in The United Kingdom, including London and Birmingham.

== History ==
The Carbonfools was formed by Titusz Bicskei, a.k.a. DJ Titusz, and Szabolcs Tóth in Budapest, Hungary. The band debuted at the Sziget Festival in 2001. In 2004, the band's first full-length studio album, entitled Poisoned Goulash, was released by Crossroads Records. The record was mixed and mastered by Rita Zboray and produced by Titusz Bicskei. On the first record, several session vocalists appeared, including Heaven Street Seven's Krisztián Szűcs, Gáspár Kornél, Zsolt Palotai.

On 8 December 2010, The Carbonfools played a show in London and on 9 December in Birmingham in United Kingdom. The Carbonfools was invited by the British band Dreadzone. The two bands also played together at the Gödör Klub in Budapest when Dreadzone presented their album Eye on the Horizon.

On 14 January 2011, their third full-length studio album was released by 1G Records entitled Carbonsoul. The band invited Balázs Fehér's father, András Fehér, to sing an opera part in the song "Sunset". The song "Hideaway" was a national success for the band, and they became a mainstream pop band in Hungary.

On 4 March 2013, The Carbonfools signed a declaration that criticizes the Hungarian government's decision that Hungarian bands who sing in English should be considered foreign bands and should have less promotion on Hungarian radio stations.

In 2017 the band announced their return with Gábor Fóris-Ferenczi taking over the singing from Balázs Fehér. They also released two new songs: Oceanfloor, Keep Breathing

== Discography ==
=== Albums ===
- Poisoned Goulash (2004)
- Carbonheart (2008)
- Carbonsoul (2010)
- Carbonsweet (2012)
- Carbonbliss (2014)
- Carbonflames (2018)
- Carbonsun (2019)
- Carbonlove (2025)

== See also ==
- Hungarian alternative
- Hungarian indie
- Hungarian pop
