= Modern (Amber Smith album) =

Studio album by Amber Smith
- Released: 6 April 2015
- Recorded: 2014
- Genre: Indie rock
- Length: 45:00
- Labels: Kalinkaland Records, Germany
- Producer: Amber Smith

Amber Smith chronology
Amber Smith (2012)	Modern (2015)	New (2017)

Singles from Modern
- 1. "Let Go" Released: 25 March 2015

Professional ratings
Review scores
Source	Rating
Recorder Blog	(None)
061	(None)
Fél Online	(8/10)
MyMusic	(None)
Quart	(8/10)

Modern is the sixth studio album recorded by Amber Smith. The album was released on 6 April 2015 by the German Kalinkaland Records. This was the first record with guitarist Tamás Faragó and bassist Oleg Zubkov. This was the first record without former Amber Smith bass guitarist Oszkár Ács.

== Track listing ==
1. "The Day After"
2. "Barking Dog"
3. "Hold On to Your Love"
4. "Let Go"
5. "Flame to the Fire"
6. "Memories of TV"
7. "Same Old Tune"
8. "Batman vs Joker"
9. "The Return"
10. "Into the Blue"

== Personnel ==
The following people contributed to Modern:

Amber Smith

- Bence Bátor - drums
- Tamás Faragó - additional guitars
- Imre Poniklo - vocals and guitars
- Oleg Zubkov - bass

Additional musicians and production

- Bence Brucker - recording
- Eszter Polyák - recording
- Zoltán Szabó - mixing
- György Ligeti - mixing (2) (6) & (9)
- Gábor Deutsch - mastering
- José Simon - artwork
