= Karthago =

Karthago can refer to:

- Karthago (band), a Hungarian rock band.
- Karthago (German band), a West Berlin–based rock band, pioneers of the Krautrock
- Karthago (musical company), a Belgian musical company, located in Ghent.
- Carthage, the city in Tunisia, North Africa.
- Karthago Airlines, a Tunisian charter airline.
