= Tamás Faragó (musician) =

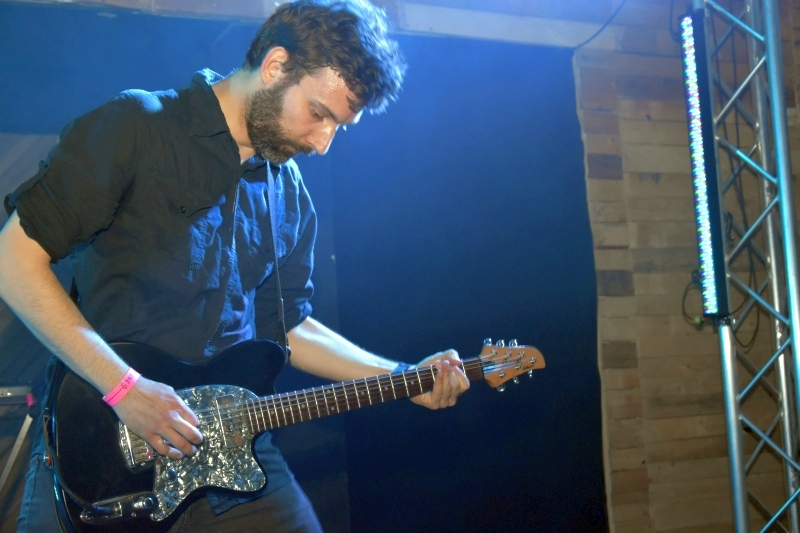

Background information
- Birth name: Tamás Faragó
- Born: 20 March 1978 (age 47); Cegléd, Hungary
- Genres: Indie rock
- Instrument: Lead guitar
- Years active: 2005-present

Tamás Faragó (born 20 March 1978) is a musician, best known as the lead guitarist of Amber Smith and We Are Rockstars.

== Early life and personal life ==
Faragó was born in Cegléd, Hungary.

== We Are Rockstars ==
Faragó is the founding member of the Hungarian indie band We Are Rockstars along with György Ligeti.

== Amber Smith ==
Faragó joined the Hungarian indie band Amber Smith in 2014. He played on the sixth full length studio album entitled Modern.

In 2019 he left Amber Smith.

== Discography ==
With We Are Rockstars:

Albums

- Lights (2017)
- Second (2013)
- Let It Beat (2011)

With Amber Smith:

Albums

- New (2017)
- Modern (2015)

With Nemjuci

Albums

- Nemjuci (2012)
- Nemjuci (2009)

== Instruments ==
=== Guitars ===
- Ibanez Talman

=== Effect pedals ===
- Boss SD-1
- Boss DD-3
- Boss TU-3
- Pro Co RAT
- Ibanez

=== Amplifiers ===
- Orange

== See also ==
- Budapest indie music scene
- Amber Smith
- Imre Poniklo
