= The Poster Boy =

Hungarian indie rock band

- Origin: Budapest, Hungary
- Genre: Indie rock
- Years active: 2011–2017
- Members: Imre Poniklo; Noel R. Mayer; Michael Zwecker; Bence Fülöp
- Website: theposterboy.net/home.html

The Poster Boy is a Hungarian indie rock band from Budapest, Hungary. The band's line-up consists of Imre Poniklo from the Budapest-based indie-rock band Amber Smith, Noel R. Mayer from the alternative rock band, The Walrus, and Michael Zwecker from the Pécs-based alternative rock band Kispál és a borz plus Zoltán Fehér "Szegecs". The band members decided to form a band while chatting about the Hungarian indie scene in a bar in Budapest. In a couple of months they wrote several songs which were recorded in late 2011.

== History ==
=== Things We Had Time For ===
On 19 January 2012, The Poster Boy released Things We Had Time For which is a song cycle. The album was recorded by Eszter Polyák and some bits by We Are Rockstars and The Puzzle singer-songwriter György Ligeti. The mastering was completed at the Abnormal studios in Pesterzsébet, Hungary. The band asked Vivek Chugh to come up with a cover. The album was available on the band Bandcamp site. The band doesn't strive to reinvent music; only to write and record good songs.

=== Melody ===
On 14 July 2012, the band's physical debut album, Melody, was released by Firestation Records in Berlin and Bell Boy Productions in Barcelona. The idea came from Serge Gainsbourg's Histoire de Melody Nelson. The CD features three new tracks (Melody, Only A Test and It's Over) as well as six tracks from Things We Had Time For. The full album was available on the band's Bandcamp site for download. Only A Test and Melody were recorded at the Abnormal Studios and were mixed by György Ligeti. The cover art was made by Esther Olóndriz. The band invited Zsolt Derecskei to play the keys on Only A Test and to sing on Melody.

=== Bonjour, C'est Pop Deux ===
On 28 March 2013, Imre Poniklo played one new song from the second studio album of the band in acoustic evening at the Hunnia Bisztró, in Budapest.

On 8 November 2013, the song Snap, Crackle POP was aired on the radio station of University of Oregon. On 15 November 2013, The Poster Boy presented their new album at Kuplung in Budapest.

In spring 2014 the album won Fonogram prize in the best Pop-rock album category.

=== On the Count of Three ===
On 23 May 2017 The Poster Boy released their third album,On the Count of Three, according to Hungarian music blog Recorder. The record was produced by György Ligeti, recorded by the band with bass player Zoltán Fehér, among feature appearances by Dorina Galambos, Szilárd Balanyi, Barna Pély and Ádám Iliás. Due to differences and tensions undisclosed, the band stopped working together until 2021.

=== Hooks ===
On 22 September 2023 The Poster Boy released their fourth album, Hooks. It was followed by their first full gig in 10 years in November on the A38 ship in Budapest, Hungary. The show will be broadcast on TV in January 2024.

== Discography ==
The Poster Boy discography
- Studio albums: 3
- Extended plays: 1
- Singles: 1
- Music videos: 2

Albums

- Things We Had Time For (2012)
- Melody (2012)
- Bonjour, C'est Pop Deux (2012)
- On the count of three (2017)
- Hooks (2023)

== See also ==
- Budapest indie music scene
