= Fran Palermo =

- Origin: Budapest, Hungary
- Genres: Alternative, Baroque pop, Vagabond, Tropical, Indie
- Years active: 2011 - Present
- Members: Henri Gonzalez; Dimitris Topuzidis; Máté Tölli; Péter Pivarnyik; Gergely Jambrik; Áron Bihaly; Dániel Sajó; Gábor Árvay; Daniel Ezra Perez
- Website: https://franpalermo.com

Fran Palermo is a Hungarian indie rock band. It was formed by the singer-songwriter Henri Gonzo in late 2011 in Budapest, Hungary. The band's music and style are characterized by different genres, mostly by indie, rock and roll, afro pop and even by Mediterranean vibes. The unique and original soundscape requires a bigger band on the stage. The specialty of the band comes not just from mixing different instruments, but from the diverse origin of the members. They have a vivid inherited cultural background such as Cuban, Spanish, Greek and Hungarian. By now Fran Palermo has become one of Budapest's main concert bands, owning numerous loyal fans.

== History ==
The band released their first EP called Arizona at the end of 2011. Their next records, both EPs, are called Museum of Clouds (2012), produced by Zoltán Takács and recorded at Abnormal Studios, and Natural Cash (2013). In 2013, Henri Gonzo moved to England for one and a half years, thus during this period the band only gave occasional concerts. After the ‘gap-year’ and a dynamic come back, the band released a new EP called Sun in Splendour, as the herald of the first full-length album. In 2015, the first Self Titled album brought a new, tropical jungle-rock sound to the Hungarian music scene. The real recognition and popularity followed the release. Ever since then, the band performed at each famous Hungarian music festival and was also finalist in a prestigious song competition.

After their performance in the talent show called Nagy-Szín-Pad, where they received the highest votes from the jury, Fran Palermo was chosen the “Discovery of the Year” at Petőfi Music Awards and a year later already nominated as the "Best Hungarian Act”. Only a year after their debut album, in May 2016 they released Razzle Dazzle, which is the band's most vivid, colorful and diverse album yet and finished on every Hungarian album top list of the year. In 2017 the group released their latest EP called Bonerider which's debut concert took place at the Big Hall of Budapest's Akvárium club in front of a 1000+ audience. The album was later claimed as one of Hungary's best releases of the year.

Fran Palermo is a returning guest to each great festival, such as Sziget Festival, VOLT Festival, but they also performed at Telekom Electronic Beast Festival, Budapest Showcase Hub and at the Dutch Eurosonic Norderslag Showcase 2017 in Groningen. Electric Castle and Awake Festival in Romania. Lately the band was as well selected to perform at one of the biggest showcase festivals of the region to MENT in Ljubljana and Waves in Vienna in Austria.

== Discography ==
Albums

- Museum of Clouds (2012) EP
- Natural Cash (2013) EP
- Sun In Splendour N°14 (2015) EP
- Fran Palermo (2015) LP
- Razzle Dazzle (2016) LP
- Bonerider (2017) EP
- Crocodile Juice Bar (2020) LP

=== Singles ===
- Arizona (2011)

== See also ==
- Budapest indie music scene
- Amber Smith
