= Kőváry =

Kőváry is a Hungarian surname. Notable people with the surname include:

- Gyula Köváry (1884–1967), Hungarian actor
- Zoltán Kőváry (born 1974), Hungarian musician
