= Tamás Mórocz =

Hungarian indie musician (born 1987)

- Birth name: Tamás Mórocz
- Born: 3 July 1987 (age 37); Székesfehérvár, Hungary
- Genres: Indie rock
- Instrument: Vocals
- Years active: 2010–present

Tamás Mórocz (born 2 July 1987) is a Hungarian indie musician, best known as the lead singer of the Hungarian indie band Jacked and Bermuda.

== Early life and personal life ==
Mórocz was born in Székesfehérvár, Hungary.

== Jacked ==
Mórocz is the founding member of Jacked.

== Bermuda ==
Mórocz is the founding member of Bermuda.

In 2012, the hit single Monte Carlo was released.

In 2013, Bermuda's second single was released entitled, London.

In 2014, the A Délután az Új Éjszaka was released.

== Discography ==
With Jacked:

Albums

- Stop The Show (2011)

With Bermuda:

Singles

- Monte Carlo (2012)
- London (2013)

== See also ==
- Budapest indie music scene
- Carbovaris
