= Žagar (band) =

Hungarian band

- Origin: Budapest, Hungary
- Genres: Electronic, indie
- Years active: 2001–present
- Label: Mole Listening Pearls
- Members: Balázs Zságer; Tibor Lázár; Ákos Zságer-Varga
- Past members: György Ligeti; DJ Bootsie; Kovács Andor
- Website: www.zagarmusic.com

Žagar (or Zagar) is a leading band in Hungarian indie and electronic music. Their sound is based on contemporary electronic music, jazz and indie rock. The results are heavy beats, atmospheric mood and sound clips from the psychedelic era of the late 1960s. Andor Kovács and the leader of the band Balázs Zságer were the co-writers of the Yonderboi album Shallow and Profound in some track.

== History ==
Their debut album was, Local Broadcast (UCMG/Ugar 2002), was selected for the chart of the 50 all-time most important Hungarian records by the music magazine WAN2. They made many soundtracks for short and feature films; the most important is Eastern Sugar (Fillcell/Universal 2004), which was the best soundtrack in 2005 in Hungary. Their music has been used in the US television series CSI: Crime Scene Investigation and its spin-off CSI: NY. The band released their second studio album, Cannot Walk Fly Instead (CLS Records), in September 2007 and 2009 worldwide on the German label, Mole Listening Pearls.

The band has been performing since 2001. They have played in Hungary, the UK, the Netherlands, Austria, Germany, Italy, Greece, Poland, Slovakia, Czech Republic and Russia. They supported Depeche Mode on the Budapest leg of the Tour of the Universe 2009. Its first single "Wings of Love", featuring the Underground Divas - six of Hungary's most popular independent singers - earned heavy radio airplay and secured a no1. spot on MTV's video chart. They earned numerous awards for this record, most notably the Hungarian Record Industry's Fonogram Award and prize in the International Songwriting Competition. They were nominated for the Regional Award in the MTV European Music Awards 2008 and 2009. Their tracks were remixed by Terry Lee Brown, Jr., Moonbotica, Eriq Johnson or Cottonmouth, among others.

== Discography ==
Žagar discography
- Studio albums: 4
- Soundtrack albums: 2
- Singles: 7

=== Studio albums ===
- Local Broadcast (2002)
- Cannot Walk Fly Instead (2007)
- Light Leaks (2013)
- Woods, Spirits & Sorcery (2019)

=== Soundtracks ===
- Szezon.Eastern Sugar (original soundtrack of the feature film "Szezon"; 2004)
- My Night Your Day (original soundtrack of the feature film "Az éjszakám a nappalod"; 2015)

=== Singles & EPs ===
- Wings of Love (2009)
- Learn to Fall (2010)
- Space Medusa (2012)
- We Are Alone EP (2014)
- Ghost Orchid (2019)
- Anata Wa Watashi (2019)
- Lost Tribes (2019)

== Remixes ==
- Bosssa Astoria/Revolution Remixes (2003)
- Wings of Love Remixes (2009)
- Cannot Walk Fly Instead extended version (w. Wings of Love Remixes) (2009)
- Prophet is a Fool Remixes (2011)
- Never the Same Remixes (2012)

== Music videos ==
Year	Title	Director
2002	Cosmic Disaster	Fillcell
2003	Bossa Astoria	Fabricius
2004	Eastern Sugar	Daniel Garas
2004	Taste of Snow	Patyomkim
2004	Bossa Astoria (Erik Sumo rework)	B.A.L.
2005	Screen Cowboys	Sándor Kristóffy
2006	Sounds and Lights	Fabricius
2007	Three Seasons Fall (werk video)	Menzkie
2007	Wings of Love	András Nagy
2009	Escape from the Earth	Menzkie
2010	Prophet is a Fool (Live at Sziget Festival)	E357
2011	Never the Same (Live with Fire Brass Band)	Bálint Szimler & Marcell Rév
2012	Never the Same	Szilvia Bolla

== Filmography ==
Year	Title	Film	Director
2004	Taste of Snow		Patyomkim
2004		Bossa Astoria	B.A.L.
2004	Monuments	The Bottle Opener Lady	Ferenc Török
2004		Tower	Fabricius
2004	Eastern Sugar	Szezon	Ferenc Török
2004	Blindfight	CSI: Crime Scene Investigation	
2006		VJ film about the Sziget Festival	Fabricius
2007	Commuted Sentences	CSI: Crime Scene Investigation	
2007	Go To Hell	CSI: New York	
2009	Adrenaline and Turbulence	documentary DVD	
2010	They Came From...	Norvegian snow board documentary	Factor Films
2010	Mission London	UK-Bulgarian-Hungarian feature film	Dimitar Mitovski

== Members ==
=== Current band members ===
- Balázs Zságer (rhodes piano, keys, electronica, programming)
- Ákos Zságer-Varga (bass)

=== Former band members ===
- Tibor Lázár (drums)
- György Ligeti (vocals, guitars)
- DJ Bootsie (scratch)
- Andor Kovács (guitars)

=== Contributors ===
- Edina Kutzora (vocal) (2002, 2004)
- Underground Divas: Edina Kutzora, Sena, Németh Juci, Hodosi Enikő, Judie Jay, Péterfy Bori (vocal in Wings of Love song 2007)
- Ferenczy Bukky (vocal) (2019)
- Zsófia Hutvágner (Lyrics)
