= 30Y =

Hungarian alternative rock band

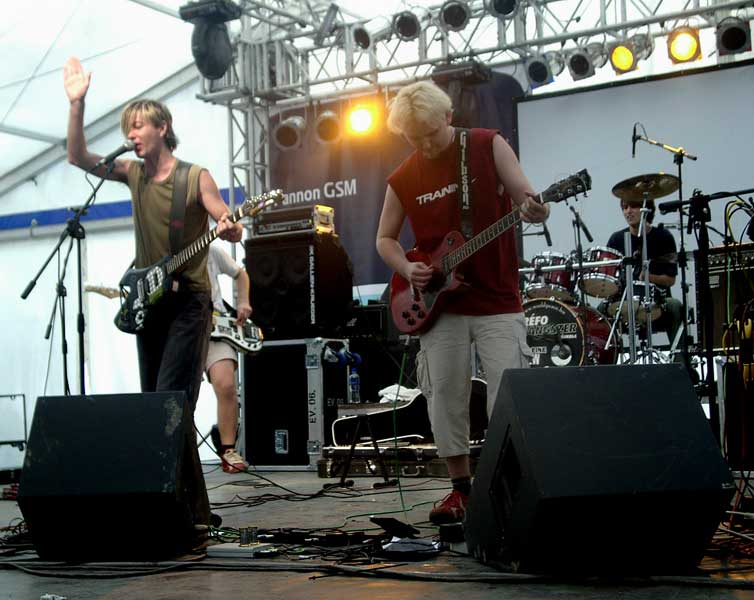

Background information
- Origin: Pécs, Hungary
- Genres: Alternative rock
- Years active: 2000-present
- Members: László Beck; Zoltán Beck; Endre Gradvolt; Zoltán Sárközi; Ádám Varga
- Website: www.30y.hu/

30Y is a Hungarian alternative rock band based in Pécs, Hungary. The band has played hundreds of gigs mainly in Hungary. The band is now one of the most important alternative rock acts in Hungary.

== History ==
Although the band members were born in different parts of Hungary, namely Ajka, Békéscsaba, Celldömölk, Devecser and Szigetvár), 30Y was formed in Pécs by the Beck brothers (László and Zoltán), Gradvolt, Sárközi and Varga. They chose the name 30Y, which was a bus service in Pécs. In the early years, they played with other Hungarian bands such as Anima Sound System, Heaven Street Seven, Kispál és a Borz and Quimby.

In 2007, 30Y hired Dávid Schram as record producer and Zoltán Takács and László Philipp as music engineers to record a full-length studio album entitled Semmi Szédítő Magasság. The album was recorded at the Abnormal Studios in Budapest so the band rented a flat in the capital.

In 2008, the band's fourth record, No.4, was released by CLS Records.

On 16 June 2008, 30Y played in the Big Hall in Serbia.

In 2010, 30Y's fifth record, Városember, was released by Megadó Kiadó.

In 2012, 30Y recorded their sixth full-length studio album, Szentimentálé. It was released by Drum & Monkey Records.

== Discography ==
30Y discography
- Studio albums: 9
- Music videos: 25

Albums

- Egy perccel tovább (2004)
- Csészényi tér (2006)
- Semmi szédítő magasság (2007)
- No.4 (2008)
- Városember (2010)
- Szentimentálé (2012)
- Dicsőség (2016)
- Ki az akit még megölelnél (2019)
- X (2023)

== See also ==
- Hungarian alternative
- Hungarian rock
