= Ármin Jamak =

Hungarian musician

- Birth name: Ármin Jamak
- Born: 19 February 1993 (age 32); Budapest, Hungary
- Genres: Indie rock
- Instrument: Vocals
- Years active: 2010–present

Ármin Jamak (born 19 February 1993) is a Hungarian indie musician, best known as the lead singer of the Hungarian indie band Carbovaris.

== Early life and personal life ==
Jamak was born in Budapest, Hungary. He attended ELTE Apáczai János Csere secondary school in Budapest.

== Carbovaris ==
Jamak is the founding member of Carbovaris.

Jamak was interviewed by Recorder on 10 July 2013. He said that he usually spends his freetime at the Balaton Lake and once he saw a concert of Anna and the Barbies. Jamak was also asked to join the band and sing a song with them.

In an interview with Radiopro, Jamak said that they shot the video clip for their song Sand and Dust on the Szentendre Island. In the video clip the band members are holding mirrors in which different landscapes can be seen.

== Discography ==
With Carbovaris:

Albums

- Milos (2011)
- A Very Milos Holiday (2013)

== See also ==
- Budapest indie music scene
- Carbovaris
