= Supersonic (band) =

- Origin: Budapest, Hungary
- Genres: Indie rock
- Years active: 2001-present
- Members: Balázs Bakó; Ádám Iliás; Csaba Neményi; András Tóth

Supersonic is a Hungarian indie rock band based in Budapest, Hungary formed in 2001. The band consists of members Balázs Bakó (vocals), Ádám Iliás (bass), Csaba Neményi (guitars), András Tóth (drums). Supersonic has been compared to bands like Primal Scream, The Verve, Derek Rochfort, and Kasabian.

== History ==
In 2002 the band released their first official recording entitled Salty Feeling (Called Love). In 2003 Supersonic released Diving In Mad Seas. Besides playing at local clubs and festivals Supersonic played several shows in The United Kingdom, Ireland, Poland, France, The Czech Republic and Germany.

In 2009 Supersonic toured The United States playing gigs in Austin, Texas, on 20 March in San Angelo, Texas, on 23 March in Las Vegas, Nevada, on 25 March in Los Angeles, California on 26 March at The Method Fest in Sagebrush, California and on 27 March Los Angeles, California.

On 20 March 2009 Supersonic played at the South by Southwest festival in Austin, Texas at the Club 115.

== Discography ==
Albums

- Salty Feeling (Called Love) (2002)
- Diving In Mad Seas (2003)
- Elite Properties (2009)

== See also ==
- Budapest indie music scene
- Amber Smith
