= The Trousers (band) =

Hungarian indie-garage rock band

- Origin: Budapest, Hungary
- Genres: Garage rock
- Years active: 2005-present
- Members: Zoltán Kőváry; Pete Locke; Ádám Iliás; Zoltán Cs.Szabó
- Website: thetrousersband.com

The Trousers are a Hungarian indie-garage rock band based in Budapest, Hungary. Their second LP Soul Machine was nominated as "The best hard rock/HM album of the year" in Hungary. They are most noted internationally for their songs used in Hawaii Five-O in the United States.

== History ==
The band was formed by Zoltán Kőváry, who previously gained popularity as the guitarist of the Hungarian indie band Amber Smith, in Budapest, Hungary. The Trousers were influenced by the 60s and 70s garage rock, hard rock, soul bands such as The Hellacopters or BRMC. Their first EP entitled Dive Insane was released in 2007 and the single "Blood For You" topped Hungarian Radio for three weeks. The album was released in the United States and France later. In 2008 their first LP was released entitled Planetary Process which helped the band to play at international festivals such as Melt! Festival in Germany, Botanique Club - Boutique Rock in Belgium, and Gutter City Garage Rock Festival in Denmark.

=== Soul Machine ===
In 2011, Soul Machine was released by EMI Records. The band invited two session musicians from the Hungarian band, Neo, namely Péter Kőváry and Enikő Hodosi, to contribute to their record. Péter Kőváry is the elder brother of The Trousers frontman.

=== Freak Beat ===
In 2013, Freak Beat was released which was recorded at the Artist Factory. The album was recorded by Zoltán Cs. Szabó. This is the first record with Peter Locke playing the guitar and Ádám Iliás playing the bass. Some of the songs were played by the band's ex-bass player Kornél Tarr. The band invited Nicke Andersson from the Hellacopters and András Gábor from the Ozone Mama.

On 24 August 2016, the band's single "Hysterical Route" was aired by Rádió Rock 95.8. Since then another single has been aired: "I Get Around".

== Discography ==
The Trousers discography
- Studio albums: 3
- EPs: 2
- Singles: 0
- Music videos: 0

Albums

- Dive Insane (2007)
- Planetary Process (2008)
- Soul Machine (2010)
- Sister Sludge (2012)
- Freakbeat (2013)
- Mother of Illusion (2015)
- Invisible Darkness (2018)

== See also ==
- Budapest indie music scene
- Hungarian rock
- Amber Smith
