= Lujza Blaha =

Hungarian actress and singer

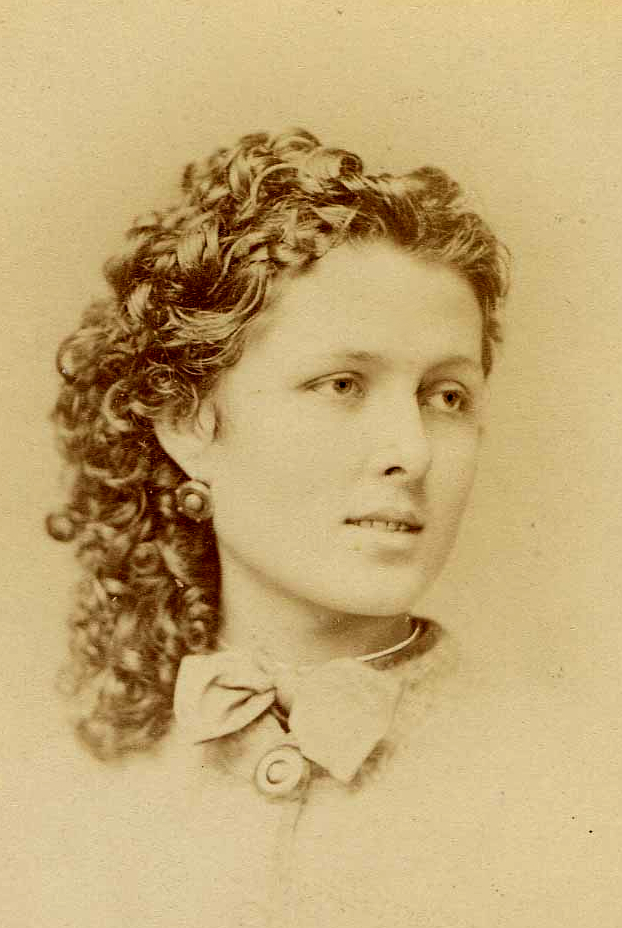
- Lujza Blaha, c. 1866
- Born: September 8, 1850; Rimaszombat, Gömör and Kishont County, Kingdom of Hungary
- Died: January 18, 1926 (aged 75); Budapest, Kingdom of Hungary
- Resting place: Fiume Road Graveyard
- Other names: Lujza Várai; Lujza Kölesi
- Occupations: Actor, singer and librettist
- Years active: 1856–1918
- Spouse(s): János Blaha (1866–1870, his death); Sándor Soldos (1875–unknown); Ödön Splényi (1881–1909, his death)
- Children: 2

Signature
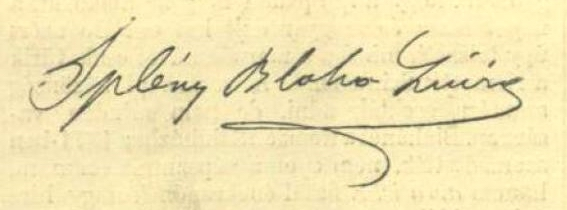

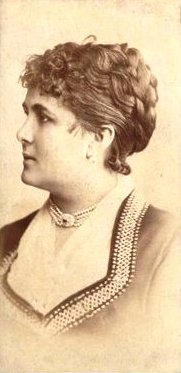
Blaha in about 1885

Lujza Blaha (Ludovika Reindl; 1850–1926) was a Hungarian actress and singer. She was known as "the nation's nightingale", an epithet given her by writer Mór Jókai.

== Personal life ==
Ludovika Reindl was born 8 September 1850 in Rimaszombat (today Rimavská Sobota, Slovakia). She married Ján Blaha, a Czech conductor in the imperial army, when she was 15 years old. He died five years later, but she kept his surname all her life despite marrying twice more. Despite being considered a "national icon" during her lifetime, she opposed the dignified "national prima donna" that was being thrust upon her and often crossed the taboos of the epoch by being sexually provocative both on stage and in her private life.

She died 18 January 1926 in Budapest. She was buried in the Kerepesi Cemetery, and her funeral drew a crowd of 100,000, including a gypsy band of 200 musicians.

== Career ==
Blaha's parents were travelling actors, and she first performed aged 15 in Szabadka (today Subotica, Serbia). She received acting training from the Budapest School of Dramatic Arts.

She joined the national theatre five years later and between 1871 and 1900 she played almost 200 parts in plays, mostly Hungarian "folk plays" or "Volksstücke", patriotic plays celebrating peasant life. Apart from her theater work, she would also draw crowds at balls, the banquets and torchlight music events organised by the Mulató-klub (The Club of Amusements), and she was also active as an operetta singer.

She also appeared in two silent films. The first, A táncz ("Dance", 1901) was an educational documentary short by Gyula Pekár, while the second, A nagymama (The Grandmother, 1916) sees her play the title role in the Alexander Korda film.

She played an important role in popularizing Hungarian gypsy songs. Her final performance in 1908 was in Gergely Csiky's play A nagymama.

== Legacy ==
Lujza Blaha Square in central Budapest was named for her in 1920 to celebrate her 70th birthday. It was the site of the Hungarian National Theatre from 1908 to 1965; this was demolished because of construction of Blaha Lujza tér metro station. Her Neoclassical summer home in the resort town of Balatonfüred, on the northern shore of lake Balaton, has been turned into a hotel bearing her name and is a minor tourist attraction of the town.

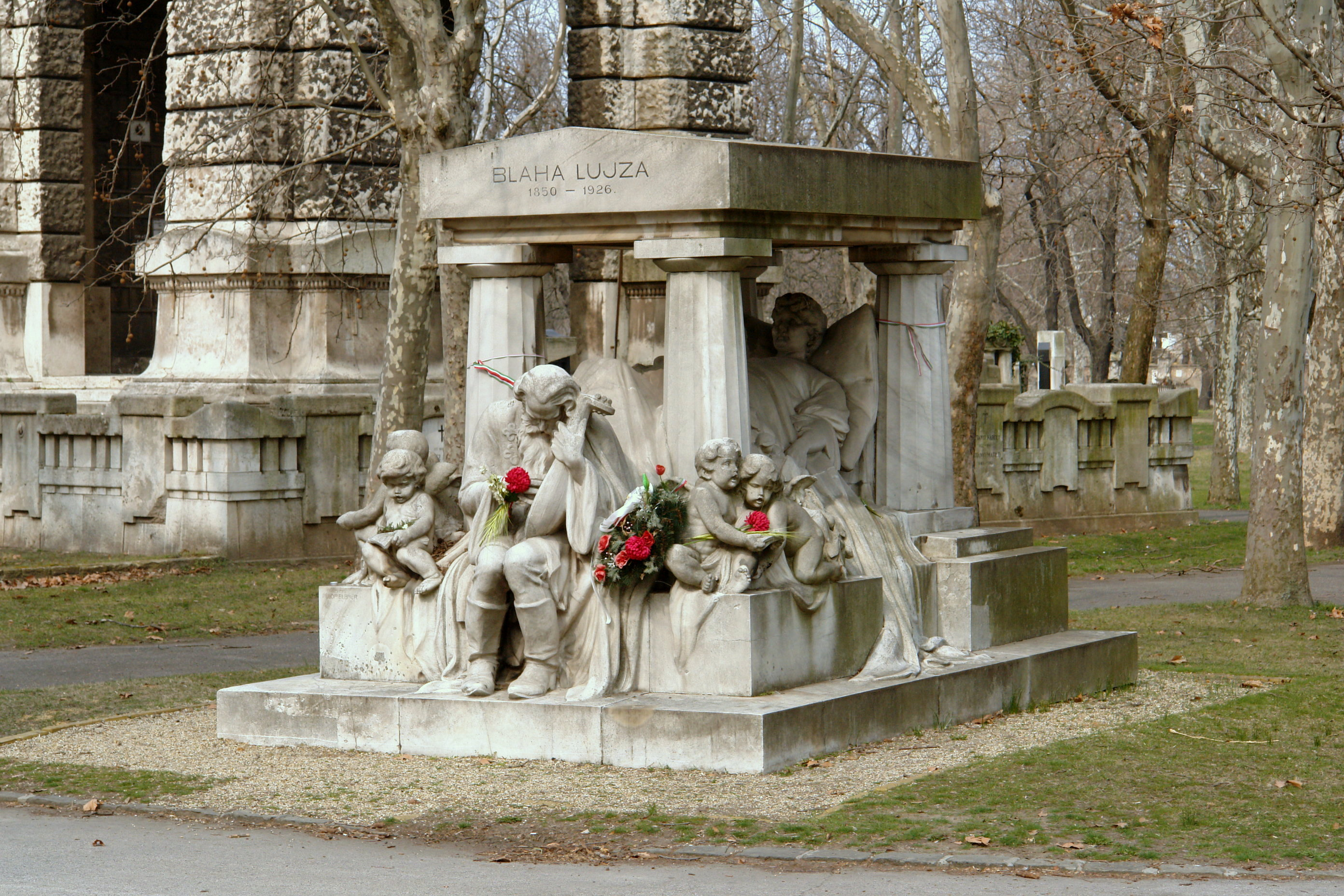
Blaha's grave in the Kerepesi Cemetery

Her tomb in Kerepesi Cemetery has been described as "one of the finest pieces in the Hungarian national pantheon".

Hungarian indie-pop band Blahalouisiana was founded in 2013.
