= Imre Poniklo =

- Birth name: Imre Poniklo
- Also known as: Poniklo
- Born: 16 October 1974 (age 50) Budapest, Hungary
- Genres: indie rock, indie pop, alternative rock, post-punk, post-punk revival
- Instrument(s): vocals, guitar, piano
- Years active: 1997–present
- Labels: Kalinkaland, Twelvetones, Firestation
- Website: Amber Smith official Poniklo Twelvetones; SALT III. Official

Imre Poniklo (born 16 October 1974) is a musician, best known as the lead singer, songwriter, lyricist and guitarist of Amber Smith. He is also a solo artist under the name Poniklo. As a singer, Poniklo's voice lies in the baritone range.

== Early life and personal life ==
Poniklo was born in Budapest, Hungary. He grew up in Csepel. His father was a sewing machine-engineer. He started becoming interested in pop music at the age of 12. Since 1988 he has been a big fan of the Manchester artists such as The Smiths and Morrissey. However, his first vinyl record was of Pet Shop Boys' Actually. Poniklo attended the School of Journalism of Bálint György for one year. However, after one year he realized that journalism is not his field. In 1995 he became friends with József Simon, who has been the album designer of Amber Smith, after seeing his advertisement in the Magyar Narancs. Simon was recruiting musicians to form a band who like The Smiths. Poniklo and Simon started writing songs together and formed the band Fanzine.

== Amber Smith ==
Poniklo is the founding member of Amber Smith along with Péter Egyedi, and Ádám Földes. Later, Poniklo recruited Annabarbi's Bence Bátor, Időrablók's Oszkár Ács, Zoltán Kőváry, Tamás Faragó.

== Solo project ==
Poniklo's first full-length studio album, entitled Poniklo, was released by Twelvetones Records under exclusive license from EMI services in October 2009. He recruited Michael Kentish (The Random Chocolates) as bass guitarist, Bence Bátor as drummer. The album was mastered by Paul Ven der Jockheyd at Foon Mastering Studios in Belgium. Poniklo asked his friend Jose Simon, who previously designed the covers of the Amber Smith albums, to design the cover for his solo album. The album contains the track called Tomi which was probably written about The Moog's frontman Tamás Szabó nicknamed Tomi. The song has the line ″De miért kell dalokat írnod, ha nem szólnak semmiről?″ (in English: ″But why do you have write songs if they are about nothing?″. His second solo album, called A Föld körul (Around the World) was published on vinyl in October 2016. This time a piano-led record, with many lyrics co-written by Kristof Hajos of The UNbending Trees fame.

== Discography ==
As a solo artist:

- Poniklo (2009)
- A Föld körül (2016)
- Oh Girl(single) (2019)

With Amber Smith:

- Nincs Ránk Szükség (2001)
- My Little Servant (2003)
- rePRINT (2006)
- Introspective (2008)
- Amber Smith (2012)
- Modern (2015)
- New (2017)
- Record (2020)
- Once Upon A Time (2024)

With The Poster Boy:

- Things We Had Time For (2012)
- Melody (2012)
- Bonjour, C'est pop Deux (2013)
- On the Count of Three (2017)
- Hooks (2023)

With SALT III.:

- SALT III. (2013)

With Yonderboi:

- Were You Thinking of Me? (2007)

With Gabriella Hámori:

- Nem örmény népzene (2014)

With Vulome:

- We Love You (2023)

== Instruments ==
=== Guitars ===
- Epiphone Casino VT (sold)
- Fender Telecaster Classic Player Tele Deluxe
- Gibson ES-325
- Gibson Standard
- Gibson J-15 acoustic guitar
- Greco EG600C Les Paul
- Sigma DR35 (acoustic guitar)
- Gibson Les Paul Special
- Tokai LS122 Les Paul
- Eastman E1D (acoustic guitar)

=== Effect pedals ===
- Line 6 (delay)

=== Amplifiers ===
- Orange
- Fender Hot Rod Deluxe
- Fender CHampion 40

== See also ==
- Budapest indie music scene
- Amber Smith
- The Poster Boy
