= Blahalouisiana =

Hungarian indie-pop/beat-rock/pop-rock band

- Origin: Székesfehérvár, Hungary
- Genres: pop-rock, soul, beat, indie pop
- Labels: Gold Record (Hungary)
- Members: Barbara Schoblocher; Gábor Jancsó; László Mózner; András Szajkó; Ádám Juhász; Máté Pénzes

Blahalouisiana are a Hungarian indie-pop/beat-rock/pop-rock band from Székesfehérvár, Hungary. It consists of vocalist Barbara Schoblocher, lead guitarist András Szajkó, bassist Gábor Jancsó, guitarist László Mózner, drummer Ádám Juhász and keyboardist Máté Pénzes. They released their first self-titled studio album in 2016 after gaining audience in the summer festival season in 2015.

As of February 2023, the band released 22 music videos, 4 studio albums and 2 EPs.

Its name refers to Hungarian actress and singer Blaha Lujza (1850-1926).

== Formation, early years (2012-13) ==
Two members, Barbara and Gábor first met in university in 2012. In one week, the current formation (without keyboardist Máté Pénzes) was together. The first started writing songs in English. Their first single, The Wanderer led the local charts for 3 weeks. In their first 1,5 years, they had about 50 concerts including one of Hungary's biggest festivals, VOLT. Their first EP, Tales of Blahalouisiana came out in 2013 and it received good response from critics. Its lead single, My Baby Wants To Leave This City was played in daily rotation in local radios.

Inspired by the 60s and American music producers, using blues and country elements the band released its first music video in the winter of 2013 for their song Tonight I'll Dress in Blue.

== National success and Blahalouisiana (2014-) ==
In 2014 they participated in a Hungarian music competition, "Nagy-Szín-Pad" where they competed against Hungarian artists like Halott Pénz and Ivan & The Parazol. By the end of the year, they released their second EP, Magamban még, consisted of 3 songs, two in English and one in Hungarian. This is the first official song released in Hungarian by the band.

In 2015, they had a busy festival season which helped them enlarge their audience. They released two singles, both with music videos. At the beginning of the year they released Ahol Összeér, and at the end of the year they released Máshol várnak, inspired by the beat era of the 60s. Both songs are in Hungarian, they were later included in the first studio album, Blahalouisiana.

In April 2016, the first album of Blahalouisiana was released under Gold Record Hungary. The album consists of 12 songs, 6 in English, 6 in Hungarian. Their lead single, Deeper (I'm Going Deeper) is the only new song with a music video.

In November 2016, Blahalouisiana released a single, Túl Távol, Elég Közel (Too far, close enough) under Rebel Music Hungary in Hungarian. The song led the local radio charts for weeks, so they released a music video for it in December. After the success of their single they announced that they are planning to release their new album by the end of 2017. In April 2017, they released one more single from the upcoming album, titled Ha élni felejtek...(If I forget to live). The music video for the song is planned to be released in the same month of its release.

== Discography ==
- Tales of Blahalouisiana EP (2013)
- Blahalouisana (2016)
- Alagutak, fények, nagymamád jegenyéi (2017)
- Minden rendben (2019)
- Hozzánk idomult éjjel az ég (2022)

== See also ==
- Budapest indie music scene
