= Budapest indie music scene =

Hungarian music scene

Budapest indie music scene was the indie music scene of Budapest, Hungary in the 2000s. It was often associated with bands like Amber Smith, The Moog, EZ Basic and We Are Rockstars.

== History ==
=== Beginnings ===
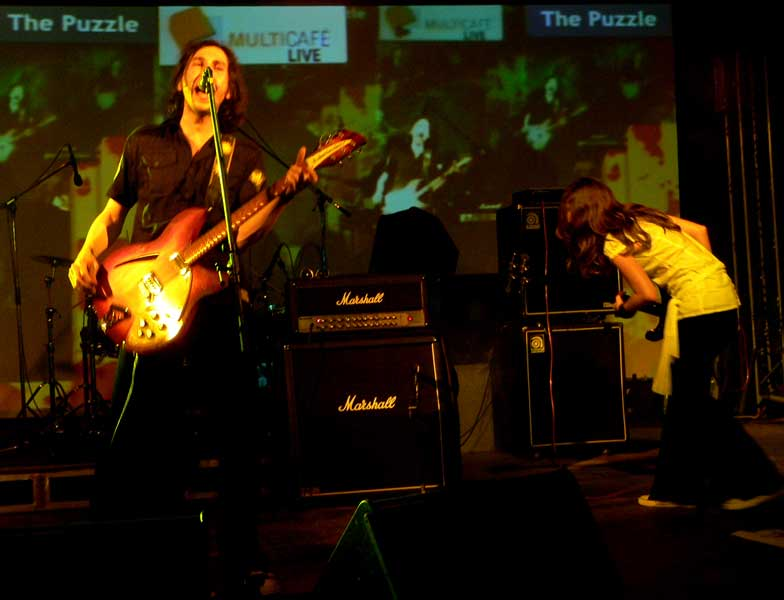
The Puzzle, one of the early birds of the Hungarian indie generation

The early 2000s was the revival of the indie music scene all over the world, which affected Hungary as well. One of the earliest Hungarian band playing indie rock were The Puzzle from Kaposvár. They were the first band whose record, entitled Dream Your Life, was released by an international label, PolyGram in 2000.

=== Successes ===
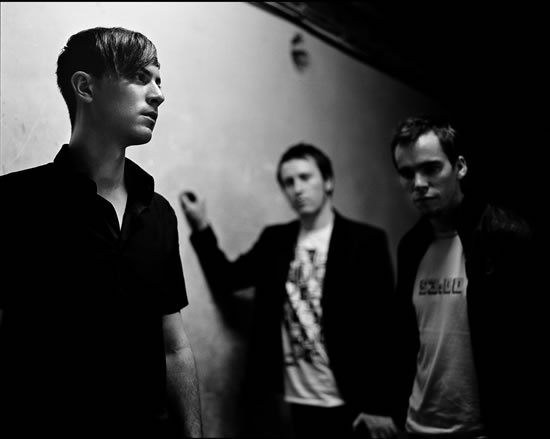
EZ Basic

On 10 March 2006, Amber Smith's third studio album, RePRINT, was released by the German Kalinkaland Records. The album included the song "Hello Sun", which brought the band international recognition.

On 10 April 2007, The Moog's first full-length studio album Sold for Tomorrow was released by the American label MuSick. The song "I Like You" brought international success for the band.

On 18 February 2008, Amber Smith's fourth studio album was released entitled Introspective. The album included songs like "Introspective", "Select All/Delete All", and "Coded".

On 21 July 2009, The Moog's second studio album was released entitled Razzmatazz Orfeum. The first single, "You Raised A Vampire", was released in colored vinyl 7" with stunning artwork by Gris Grimly. The 7" also includes a B-side cover of the Bauhaus classic "The Passion Of Lovers" featuring Bauhaus/Love and Rockets bassist/vocalist David J, who became a fan of the band after seeing them perform in Hollywood, Los Angeles, California in 2008. The video for "You Raised A Vampire" was shot in the same gothic building in Budapest where the first Underworld movie was made.

The 2010s saw the emergence of new indie bands such as Carbovaris and Bastiaan, which is the side-project of The Moog singer Tamás Szabó.

=== Decline ===
The decline of the Hungarian indie started in the 2010s, although the most notable bands such as Amber Smith, The Moog and EZ Basic did not disband. From the 2010s two new bands, Carbovaris and Fran Palermo, started to take over the Hungarian indie scene, however, with moderate success. These bands did not attract such a big audience as Amber Smith or The Moog could in the mid 2000s. The decline can also be attributed to the fact that Imre Poniklo started several projects in the 2010s, such as The Poster Boy, SALT III., and Krapulax & Bellepomme. Therefore, one of the most important bands did not play at concerts which lower their popularity. In addition, the indie rock genre also experienced a decline all over the world which obviously affected the Hungarian indie scene.

On 10 April 2012 The Moog released their third studio album entitled Seasons in the Underground produced by Ken Scott followed by US tour with bands like B-52s and David Lane. The Moog concentrated on their US carrier with moderate success.

On 21 April 2012, Amber Smith released their fifth studio album entitled Amber Smith. Although Poniklo claimed that this record is one of the best ones among the previous releases, the band did not achieve those sorts of successes as with the previous records.

== Notable bands and artists ==
- Amber Smith
- Bence Bátor
- Bermuda
- Blahalouisiana
- Caesar's Bread
- Carbovaris
- Dawnstar
- Esti Kornél
- EZ Basic
- Tamás Faragó
- Fran Palermo
- Gustave Tiger
- Hangmás
- Heaven Street Seven
- Jacked
- The KOLIN
- Zoltán Kőváry
- György Ligeti
- The Moog
- Tamás Mórocz
- Panic Radio
- The Pills
- Imre Poniklo
- The Poster Boy
- The Puzzle
- The Trousers
- Supersonic
- Tamás Szabó
- Zoltán Takács
- We Are Rockstars

== See also ==
- Hungarian music (disambiguation)
- Hungarian pop
- Hungarian rock
