= A. E. Bizottság =

Hungarian underground band

- Origin: Szentendre, Hungary
- Genres: Art punk, new wave, alternative rock, underground music
- Years active: 1980–1985
- Label: Hungaroton
- Members: András Wahorn, István ef Zámbó, László feLugossy, Kokó, István Szulovszky, Mária Bán, Kriszta Kecskés (as a recurring guest)
- Past members: Sándor Bernáth(y), László Kreutz, Máté Victor, László Waszlavik

A. E. Bizottság was a Hungarian underground band formed by three avant-garde painters and their friends, non-professional musicians in the early 1980s. Their name translates as 'Albert Einstein Committee'. After their formation in 1980, they released one studio album and one soundtrack album before breaking up in 1985.

== Discography ==
- 1983 Kalandra fel
- 1984 Jégkrémbalett, of which a film was also made, bearing the same title – it was, similarly to a "music video" made for a song, a "music movie" for the album (having the entire album as its soundtrack).
- 1986 Amor Guru (compilation by Eksakt Records, NL)
- 1993 Edd meg a fényt by László FeLugossy, Kokó, András Wahorn, István Szulovszky (The Bizottság members, minus the drummer girl, Mária Bán, in a post-Bizottság formation).

== Filmography ==
- 1983 Kutya éji dala, a film by Gábor Bódy, in which Bizottság appeared as themselves, part of the film's story, performing several songs.
- 1984 Jégkrémbalett, their own film, which they made at the BBS (Béla Balázs Studió), as an extension to their album with the same title, but still, as an independent production.
