= The Mighty Fishers =

- Origin: Budapest, Hungary
- Genres: Rocksteady, reggae, ska, lovers rock
- Years active: 2011–present
- Members: Anna "CéAnne" Szélinger; Tamás Roza; András Schlosser; Péter "Reti" Ádám; Ádám Sütő-Nagy
- Website: www.themightyfishers.com

The Mighty Fishers is a Hungarian band formed in Budapest, in 2011 and is playing traditional rocksteady, early reggae and lovers rock as the one and only band in the country. The authentic style is guaranteed by the seven members playing the drum, bass, guitars, organ, two lead vocals and three more backing vocals.

First EP (’High Four’) was released in September 2011 and it's also available online on Liquidator Music (ES), SoundCloud and many other songs on their YouTube channel. One of the songs is on Mad Butcher Records compilation Skannibal Party vol. 11.

The band had several concerts all over Europe (e.g. in Budapest, Sárvár, Délegyháza /HU/, Bratislava /SK/, Wien and Großwarasdorf /A/, Schwäbisch Gmünd /DE/, Baden, Lucerne /CH/, Strasbourg /FR/, Koksijde /BE/, Sibenik, Lepoglava /HR/).

The Mighty Fishers was also invited to the famous Sziget Festival (HU), the Skaville Festival (HR) and to Rototom Sunsplash Festival. Magazines in Belgium, Hungary, France, and Germany have already written EP and band reviews and interviews as well.

In June 2012, The Mighty Fishers released the second EP entitled ‘Where Are You?’ alongside the first videoclip which is available on their YouTube channel.

First LP, ‘Soul Garden’, was released in April, 2014 under the wings of the cooperation between Mad Butcher Records (DE), Redstar73 Records (ES) and Casual Records (FR) on CD and vinyl as well containing thirteen songs.

== Band members ==
- Anna CéAnne Szélinger – vocals
- Tamás Roza – keyboards
- András Schlosser – lead guitar
- Péter Reti Ádám – rhythm guitar
- Ádám Sütő-Nagy – bass guitar
- Béla Fábián – drums and percussion

== Discography ==
=== EPs ===
Year	Album	Tracks
2011	High Four	4
2012	Where Are You?	3
2016	Newsteady EP	5

=== Studio albums ===
Year	Album	Tracks
2014	Soul Garden	13
