= The KOLIN =

Indie-pop band from Hungary

The KOLIN are a Hungarian indie-pop band best known for their hit song San Francisco. The band was formed in 2007 in Budapest. Their music style is synthpop influenced with indie rock and new rave sounds. The band consists of Márkó Linczényi (vocals/synthesizer), Ágoston Iván (drums) and Ferigeri (bass). Their debut album called Yell into The Kazzo. It was released in 2008 by Universal Music Group. The KOLIN won the award for Best Hungarian Act at the 2009 and 2010 MTV Europe Music Awards.

== Perez Hilton's reaction ==
Perez Hilton, the famous American celebrity blogger gave a positive review for San Francisco on his blogsite:

"We are LOVING loving LOVING this band called the KOLIN - from Hungary.

Yes, Hungary! They sing in English, though. So you'll be able to understand what they're saying. We've never mention a band from Hungary before, and we are thrilled to pop our cherry with the KOLIN. If you like sweet, sexy, dirty, garage, disconess, then you will love the band!

Think Scissor Sisters meets The Gossip. We think the Bay Area has a new anthem!!!"

== Discography ==
=== Studio albums ===
- Yell into The Kazoo (2008)
- KRIXKRAX (2016)

== Videography ==
- "Jimmy" Directed by Danila Kostil (2008) - Winner of the KAFF Award for Best Music Video in 2011.
- "San Francisco" Directed by Danila Kostil (2009)

== Awards ==
- 2009: MTV Europe Music Awards/Best Hungarian Act
- 2010: MTV Europe Music Awards/Best Hungarian Act

== See also ==
- Budapest indie music scene
