= Oszkár Ács =

- Birth name: Oszkár Ács
- Born: Szeged, Hungary
- Genres: indie rock, darkwave, synthpop, psychedelic pop
- Instruments: bass guitar, synthesizer, electric guitar, percussion, vocals
- Years active: 1988–present
- Formerly of: Amber Smith

Oszkár Ács (born 1969) is a musician, best known as the bass guitarist of Amber Smith.

== Early life and personal life ==
Ács was born in Szeged, Hungary. He is the co-founder of Időrablók. He joined Amber Smith in 2002. He left the band in 2012 due to his deteriorating illness.

== Amber Smith ==
Ács also wrote some songs for Amber Smith's eponymous record (Amber Smith).

In January 2013, Ács left the band. Imre Poniklo said that Ács was a creative member of the band and he thought of disbanding Amber Smith after the departure of Ács.

In an interview with Recorder Blog, Ács said that Morrissey was his idol when he was invited to analyse Morrissey's World Peace Is None of Your Business release.

On 16 October 2015, Ács played the bass on some songs at the 15th anniversary of Amber Smith in Budapest.

== The Twist ==
In 2010 Ács founded the Hungarian indie band, The Twist, with members of Heaven Street Seven.

== Discography ==
With Amber Smith:

Albums

- My Little Servant (2003)
- rePRINT (2006)
- Introspective (2008)
- Amber Smith (2012)

== Instruments ==
=== Guitars ===
- Danelectro DC Bass
- Silvertone 1478 Reissue

=== Effect pedals ===
- Electro-Harmonix Bass Micro Synthesizer

=== Amplifiers ===
- Ampeg B2 combo
- Fender Super Champ X2

== See also ==
- Budapest indie music scene
- Amber Smith
- Imre Poniklo
