= Bence Bátor =

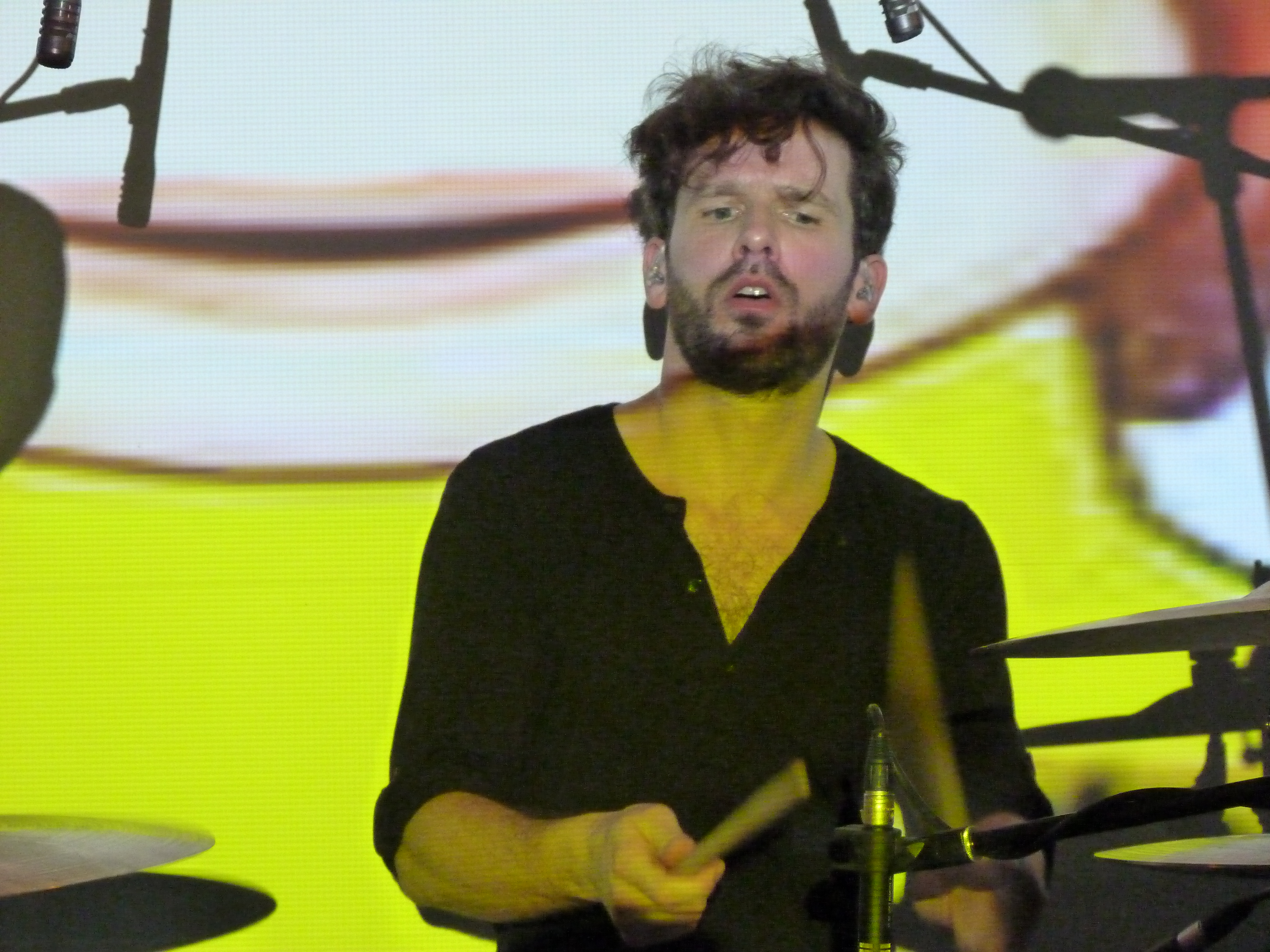

Background information
- Birth name: Bence Bátor
- Born: 23 July 1977 (age 47); Tatabánya, Hungary
- Genres: Indie rock, pop, rock, funk
- Instrument: Drums
- Years active: 1993–

Bence Bátor (born 23 July 1977) is a Hungarian musician, best known as session drummer and the drummer of the Hungarian indie band Amber Smith and "Frenk" and "ABBA Tribute Show" and also of "Bowies Keep Swinging", a David Bowie tribute band and in other projects. Bátor has been pursuing a modeling and commercial acting career in Hungary and worldwide.

== Early life and personal life ==
Bátor was born in Tatabánya, Hungary. He attended the Kodolányi János University of Applied Sciences. He moved to the capital of Hungary, Budapest in 1997, where he still resides.

== Amber Smith ==
Bátor joined Amber Smith in 2000. Bátor has played the drums on four Amber Smith albums, RePRINT, Introspective, Amber Smith, Modern and NEW.

Discography With Amber Smith:

Albums

- rePRINT (2006)
- Introspective (2008)
- Amber Smith (2012)
- Modern (2015)
- NEW (2017)

== Instruments ==
=== Drums ===
Bátor uses TAMA drums: TAMA Silverstar Birch Limited Edition kit in "Snow White Pearl" finish. Bátor uses full TAMA hardwares and MEINL Byzance Vintage Sand cymbals.

== Modelling career ==
Bátor appeared in commercials for several companies, including T-Mobile, Grando.hu, Füstli, Minor Falling In Love, Heizen Mit Öl, Flavon, CIB Bank, Honda, Grundfos, and Telenor.

== See also ==
- Budapest indie music scene
- Amber Smith
- Imre Poniklo
