= Carbovaris =

Hungarian indie rock band

- Origin: Budapest, Hungary
- Genres: Indie rock
- Years active: 2009–2014
- Labels: Unsigned
- Past members: Ármin Jamak; Soma Balázs; Dániel Nyitray; Zsombor Lehoczky

Carbovaris were a short-lived Hungarian indie rock band based in Budapest, Hungary, formed in 2009. The band consisted of members Ármin Jamak (vocals), Dániel Nyitray (bass), Soma Balázs (guitars), Zsombor Lehoczky (drums).

== History ==
In 2012 the band's first LP was released entitled Milos.

In 2013, the band was nominated as the best new act in Hungary by the Viva TV.

On 6 December 2013, Carbovaris released two singles, Sand & Dust and Automatic/Pragmatic, from their forthcoming album.

On 12 December 2013, Carbovaris played at the A38 in Budapest, Hungary. The show was available on stream.

Carbovaris played their last show at the Gozsdu Manó Klub in Budapest on 31 January 2014.

== Band members ==
- Ármin Jamak – lead vocals
- Soma Balázs – guitar
- Dániel Nyitray – bass guitar
- Zsombor Lehoczky – drums

== Discography ==
Albums

- Milos (2011)
- A Very Milos Holiday (2013)

== See also ==
- Budapest indie music scene
- Amber Smith
