= György Ligeti (musician) =

- Also known as: Gyuri Ligeti
- Born: György Ligeti; 19 December 1973 (age 52); Kaposvár, Hungary
- Genres: indie rock, indie pop, alternative rock, post-punk, post-punk revival
- Instruments: vocals, guitar
- Years active: 1997–present
- Website: www.wearerockstarsband.com

György Ligeti (Hungarian pronunciation: [ˈɟørɟ ˈliɡɛti]; born 19 December 1973) is a Hungarian indie musician, record producer, best known as the lead singer, songwriter, lyricist and guitarist of the indie rock band We Are Rockstars, and the disbanded The Puzzle. He is also the singer and guitarist of the Hungarian electro band, Žagar. He is not related to the avant-garde classical composer of the same name, György Ligeti (1923–2006).

== Early life and personal life ==
Ligeti was born in Kaposvár, Hungary. He attended the Munkácsy Mihály Gimnázium és Szakközépiskola in Kaposvár. Ligeti obtained a Master of Arts in Communication and media studies from the University of Pécs in 2012.

Ligeti moved to London, England where he worked as a shop assistant at the Algerian Coffee Stores from 2004 to 2009.

On 26 February 2009, Ligeti was interviewed by Magyar Rádió.

In 2010 Ligeti became the radio presenter of the Stockholm Syndrome Radio which aims to present new Hungarian indie rock bands.

On 25 July 2013, Ligeti was interviewed by Phenomenon.hu to present his favourite meal, Aglio olio peperoncino.

In 2014 Ligeti sang Odett's song called Éjszaka, while Odett sang We Are Rockstars's 2014 single Rólunk szól at the Szimfonik Live 2014.

Ligeti considers himself as a Parni-Scythian.

=== The Puzzle ===
Ligeti formed The Puzzle in 1997 in Kaposvár, Hungary.

Ligeti moved to London, The United Kingdom in 2004 to promote his band.

=== We Are Rockstars ===
Ligeti is the founding member of We Are Rockstars along with Tamás Faragó and Csaba Kovács. Their first album was released in 2011.

== Production career ==
=== Production ===
- 2007: The Puzzle: You're So Cruel
- 2012: The Poster Boy – Things We Had Time For
- 2019: Goodbye Darjeeling: Total Confusion

=== Mixing ===
- 2011: Amber Smith – Square 1 (Salad Days)
- 2012: Amber Smith – Amber Smith

== Discography ==
With The Puzzle:

- Dream Your Life (2000)
- Csak Játék (2003)
- rEvolution (2004)
- You're So Cruel (2007)
- Hazatérés (2009)
- Más Bolygóról (2011)

With Žagar:

- Local Broadcast (2002)
- Eastern Sugar (Soundtrack) (2004)
- Cannot Walk Fly Instead (2007)
- Light Leaks (2013)

With We Are Rockstars:

- Let It Beat (2011)

== Instruments ==
- Fender Stratocaster

== See also ==
- Budapest indie music scene
- Notable Hungarian producers
- The Puzzle
- We Are Rockstars
- Žagar
