= Hungarian music =

Hungarian music may refer to:

- Music of Hungary, which includes many kinds of music associated with Serbian, Roma and ethnically Hungarian people
- Hungarian folk music, which is found in Hungary as well as parts of Serbia, Slovakia and Romania
