= Warpigs (band) =

Hungarian rock band

Warpigs was a Hungarian rock band formed in 1993 .

== History ==
After several member changes, the classic lineup from 1997 consisted of the two Eszenyi brothers, György Újhelyi and Bálint Gátos. They split in 1999 with singer Péter Eszenyi leaving the band. Several singers were drafted to replace him, including Marci Lombos and Chris Alexander, but none of them stayed for long. In 2006 they started playing together again with Eszenyi as singer. Bassist Bálint Gátos has been replaced with Péter Szabó (Igor, HAW) at concerts during the 2010s. They haven't been active in the 2020s.

In the 1990s they played at several high-profile gigs and festivals including Sziget Festival in Budapest and Volt Festival in Sopron, as well as opening for Dog Eat Dog, Bon Jovi, Biohazard and Kiss.

The band took their name from the song War Pigs by British heavy metal rockers Black Sabbath from their 1970 album, Paranoid. Faith No More, which influenced the music of Warpigs, also did a cover of this song on their album The Real Thing. The song talks about war and the absurdities of those who make war without regard to the powerless people who are sent to die. It's sometimes called a protest song.

Their first video, Szandál, was directed by Nimród Antal, who later used the same idea for his first major motion picture Kontroll (2003). He and the band members came up with the idea for the video together, however, they are uncredited on Kontroll.

Hungarian Olympic champion water polo player Gergely Kiss is one of their biggest fans.

Gábor Eszenyi has since joined a new band called Jamestown in London where both he and his brother Peter now live. Peter Eszenyi is a visual effects (VFX) supervisor.

Their single Monte Carlo is still regularly played on radio stations.

== Members ==
- Singer: Péter "Petas" Eszenyi (sometimes credited as Peter Eszenyi)
- Drums: Gábor "Hekk" Eszenyi
- Guitar: György "Jimbo" Újhelyi
- Bass: Péter "Pó" Szabó
- Bass: Bálint Gátos (currently not a member)
- Keyboard: Peter "Dudu" Dózsa (currently not a member)
- Extra Vocals: Bence Balázs (currently not a member)

== Discography ==
- Collected (1995, demo)
- Rapid (1997 Polygram)
- Quartz (1999 Polygram/3T) produced by Emmy-winning recording engineer Donal Hodgson.
- Analóg (2000, EP)

== Awards and nominations ==
- Rapid was nominated for the Golden Giraffe Award in 1998. This is the most prestigious Hungarian music award, presented by the Association of Hungarian Record Companies (MAHASZ). The award is currently known as the Fonogram Award.
- Quartz was nominated for the Golden Giraffe Award in 2000.
- Monte Carlo was included on MR2 Petofi Radio's top 100 list of the past 10 years at No. 68. The list was compiled in 2011 March.

Their second video for the song Monte Carlo, directed by Márton Nyitrai, won MTV Europe's Best Hungarian Music Video award in 1999.
