= Introspective (Amber Smith album) =

Studio album by Amber Smith
- Released: 18 February 2008 (Hungary), 29 February 2008 (Lithuania)
- Recorded: 2007
- Genre: Indie rock
- Length: 49:00
- Labels: M.P.3 International, Lithuania
- Producer: Chris Brown

Amber Smith chronology
RePRINT (2006)	Introspective (2008)	Amber Smith (2012)

Singles from Introspective
- 1. "Introspective" Released: 1 December 2007

Professional ratings
Review scores
Source	Rating
EST	(9/10)

Introspective is the fourth studio album recorded by Amber Smith. The album was recorded at the Podium Studios in Budapest, Hungary in 2007. The album was mixed by Chris Brown, who previously worked on Radiohead's The Bends album, and it was mastered at Foon Mastering Studios in Belgium. The album was released by the Lithuanian label M.P.3 International as CD and digitally.

The presentation of the album took a place on 29 February 2008 in the music club L'Amour, Vilnius, the capital of Lithuania. Eventually the album won the award of the best alternative record in Hungary in 2009. During the campaign of the album the videos were filmed for the songs Introspective and Select All/Delete All.

On 1 December 2007, the first single, Introspective, was released from the eponymous album.

== Track listing ==
1. "Introspective"
2. "1980"
3. "Coded"
4. "Select All/Delete All"
5. "Brazil"
6. "Hectic"
7. "Treading Water"
8. "Welcome to CIA"
9. "Simon Says"
10. "Father"
11. "My Final Plea"

== Personnel ==
The following people contributed to Introspective:

Amber Smith

- Oszkár Ács - bass
- Bence Bátor - drums
- Zoltán Kőváry - guitars
- Imre Poniklo - vocals and guitars

Additional musicians and production

- Dávid Vesztergombi - strings
