= Amber Smith (band) =

Hungarian pop band

- Origin: Budapest, Hungary
- Genre: Indie rock
- Years active: 2000–present
- Labels: M.P.3 International, Lithuania; Kalinkaland, Germany
- Members: Bence Bátor; Imre Poniklo; Oleg Zubkov
- Past members: Oszkár Ács; Péter Egyedi; Tamás Faragó; Ádám Földes; Nathan Johnson; Zoltán Kőváry; Gergely Szabados; Ákos Örményi; Pete Pawinski; Zalán Póka
- Website: www.ambersmith.hu

Amber Smith are a Hungarian pop trio based in Budapest, Hungary formed in 2000 by Imre Poniklo. The band's current line-up is Imre Poniklo (vocals, guitars), Oleg Zubkov a.k.a. Tooff (bass) and Bence Bátor (drums). Amber Smith were one of the most prominent groups of the Budapest indie music scene in the 2000s.

== History ==
Amber Smith were formed by singer-songwriter Imre Poniklo in 2000 as a side-project in Budapest, Hungary. Imre Poniklo was the guitarist of the Hungarian alternative band Fanzine. At that time the singer of the Fanzine was José Simon, a professional graphic designer, who is currently the stylist of Amber Smith. In 2000 Imre Poniklo asked his fellow Fanzine mates (Ákos Örményi, Péter Egyedi, Ádám Földes) help him recording a demo entitled Above the Clouds. Later the German Firestation Records released four songs from this early demo entitled There's No Way. After releasing one studio album entitled Nincs Ránk Szükség (There's No Need for Us), and a five-song demo entitled Pozitív (Positive), Imre Poniklo left Hungary and moved to London, England and then to Ireland. The remaining members of the band formed the band, Annabarbi. In 2002 Oszkár Ács (previously played in Időrablók from Szeged) joined the band and in the same year Amber Smith recorded their first studio album in English language entitled My Little Servant. At the same time the line-up was changed four times (Nathan Johnson, Pete Pawinski, Tamás Faragó and Tibor Simon). The album My Little Servant was released in 2003 followed by a tour in Germany, France, Spain and Croatia. In addition, Imre Poniklo presented the album in Tokyo, Japan as a solo artist. Imre Poniklo wrote the song Were You Thinking of Me for Yonderboi's Splendid Isolation album in 2005. Later Zoltán Kőváry arrived and they recorded their first successful record entitled rePRINT in 2006.

=== Reprint ===
In May 2004 Amber Smith started recording their third studio album entitled rePRINT at the Akustair Studios and at the Fenn-Ti Studios in Budapest. The recording was finished in September 2004, however the band continued an additional recording at the Fenn-Ti Studios in April 2005. The producer of the album was Amber Smith and additionally Robin Guthrie (from Cocteau Twins) except the song rePRINT which was produced by Hungarian indie artist Yonderboi. The album was mastered by Jácint Jiling and mixed by Robin Guthrie and Gábor Deutsch. This time additional musicians contributed to the creation of the album. Violins were played by Dóra Maros and Györgyi Tihanyi while viola was played by Tímea Kerekes. The album was released by Kalinkaland Records.

=== Introspective ===
At the end of 2006 Amber Smith started working on their next album entitled Introspective. This time with a different producer called Chris Brown, who previously worked on Radiohead's The Bends as an engineer and on Muse's Origin of Symmetry. The eponymous first single Introspective was released in November 2007. The album was released by the Lithuanian label M.P.3 International as CD and digitally on 18 February 2008 first in Hungary, then in the Baltics and finally in Germany. The album won the award of the Best Alternative Record in Hungary in 2009.

On 14 March 2009 Amber Smith released an EP called Time. In spring 2009 the band played at the SXSW festival in the United States in San Antonio and Austin, Texas. In 2009 Zoltán Kőváry left the band in order to concentrate on his band, The Trousers, after 5 years which indicated a pause for the band. In 2010 Imre Poniklo released a solo album (with Amber Smith drummer Bence Bátor) entitled Poniklo. In 2011 Gergely Szabados (guitars) and Zalán Póka (keyboards) joined the band.

=== Amber Smith ===
On 21 February 2012 Amber Smith released their fifth studio album entitled Amber Smith. The album was recorded at the Metropol Studios by Dániel Sándor and Eszter Polyák in Budapest, Hungary. The album was mixed by György Ligeti (We Are Rockstars and The Puzzle).

On 5 March 2013, Amber Smith announced on their Facebook profile that Oszkár Ács left the band. Later, it was confirmed by several music websites. The post did not mention any reasons for his departure. The band recorded four full-length studio albums with Ács, who also contributed to the songwriting with songs like Welcome To C.I.A., Bourbon and Soda, Faster Than The Speed of Light, Your Life Is My Death, Hong Kong Falls. Ács spent about 10 years with the band and later determined the sound of the band with his unique bass playing style.

=== Another Way ===
On 29 November 2013, Amber Smith released their EP entitled Another Way. The EP contains the title track and Merciful Sea written by Poniklo and Zubkov. The album was recorded at Supersize Studio and Echo Studio in Budapest and it was mixed by György Ligeti and mastered at Abnormal Studios in Pesterzsébet. Csaba Neményi, who played the live shows with the band in 2013, was invited to play the guitars on Another Way. The single was produced with the aid of Nemzeti Kultúrális Alap (National Cultural Fund).

=== Modern ===
On 6 April 2015, Amber Smith's sixth full-length studio album, Modern, was released.

Oleg "Toof" Zubkov (of Kollaps fame) joined the band in spring 2013 and is a member since, contributing his unique style in both playing and songwriting to amber smith on 2015's synth-dominated LP Modern and on 2017's eclectic album "New".

=== New ===
The latter record features collaborations by Árpád Szarvas (EZ Basic) and Vera Jónás. The band is currently playing shows supporting the album, with a Russian tour planned for autumn 2018.

In 2019 Tamás Faragó left the band because he moved to London with his family.

On 30 December 2019 they played a show at Mika in Budapest. Poniklo announced that the band recorded their upcoming album to be released in 2020.

=== Record ===
In 2020 the band released their eighth studio album entitled Record. The songs were written by Poniklo, Bátor and Zubkov trio. The album was recorded at Starmusic Studio in Budapest by Ábel Zwickl. The keyboards on the song The Folksinger's Midlife Crisis was played by the band's former keyboardist, Zalán Póka. Dávid Sajó, journalist of Index, rated the album 4 out of ten. He pointed out that Amber Smith could not release the influence of the 2000s indie rock. The album is heavily influenced by British bands such as Placebo, The Editors, and Muse. Sajó also said that the album is professionally composed and recorded, although there is no single minute which he did not hear 15 years ago.

== Band members ==
Current line-up

- Imre Poniklo – lead vocals, guitar (2000–present)
- Oleg Zubkov – bass guitar (2013–present)
- Bence Bátor – drums (2001–2002, 2004–present)

Former members

- Péter Egyedi – guitar (2000–2002)
- Ádám Földes – drums (2000)
- Ákos Örményi – bass guitar (2000–2002)
- Oszkár Ács – bass guitar (2002–2012)
- Tamás Faragó – guitar (2002–2003, 2013–2019)
- Peter Pawinski – keyboards (2002–2003)
- Nathan Johnson – drums (2002–2004)
- Zoltán Kőváry – guitar (2005–2009)
- Zalán Póka – keyboards (2011–2012)
- Gergely Szabados – guitar (2011–2012)

== Discography ==
Amber Smith discography
- Studio albums: 8
- Extended plays: 1
- Singles: 9
- Music videos: 4

Albums (LP)

- Nincs Ránk Szükség (2001)
- My Little Servant (2003)
- RePRINT (2006)
- Introspective (2008)
- Amber Smith (2012)
- Modern (2015)
- New (2017)
- Record (2020)
- Once Upon A Time (2024)

== Videography ==
Music videos

- I Was The First (2004)
- Hello Sun (2006)
- Sea Eyes (unreleased, 2006)
- Introspective (2007)
- Select All/Delete All (2008)
- Time (2010)
- Faster Than The Speed of Light (2012)
- Bourbon and Soda (2012)
- Another Way (2013)
- Hold On To Your Love (2015)
- Same Old Tune (2015)
- Barking Dog (2015)
- Cape (2017)
- Straight to Video (2017)
- Pyrrhic Victory, Merciful Sea, Someday – live in session (2018)
- Wasted Love (2020)
- Pinocchio (2021)
- What Do You Know About Love? (2024)
- Over The Moon (2024)

== See also ==
- Budapest indie music scene
- Imre Poniklo
- The Poster Boy
- The Trousers
