= RePRINT =

rePRINT

Studio album by Amber Smith
- Released: 10 March 2006 (Germany)
- Recorded: 2004–2005
- Genre: Indie rock
- Length: 42:05
- Labels: Kalinkaland, Germany
- Producer: Imre Poniklo

Amber Smith chronology
| My Little Servant (2003) | rePRINT (2006) | Introspective (2008) |

Singles from rePRINT
- 1. "Hello Sun" Released: 1 September 2005

Professional ratings
Review scores
| Source | Rating |
|---|---|
| Allmusic | |
| Magyar Narancs | (9/10) |
| Soundmag | |
| Gaesteliste | |

RePRINT is the third studio album recorded by Hungarian band Amber Smith. The album was released on 10 March 2006 by the German Kalinkaland Records. The album was recorded at Akustair Studio and Fenn-Ti Studio from 2004 to 2005. The sound engineers were Levente Borsay and Jácint Jilling and it was mastered at Akustair Studio and mixed by Robin Guthrie, from the legendary Cocteau Twins. The song from this album, Hello Sun, brought international success for the band.

On 1 September 2005, the first single, Hello Sun, was released including three other songs, Sea Eyes, Pete and Julie and rePRINT.

== Track listing ==
1. "Chemistry/Arithmetic"
2. "Hello Sun"
3. "Lindsay's Song"
4. "Sea Eyes"
5. "Identity"
6. "Reprint"
7. "White"
8. "July"
9. "Caleidoscope"
10. "Reprise"
11. "Holograms"

== Personnel ==
The following people contributed to rePRINT:

Amber Smith

- Oszkár Ács - bass
- Bence Bátor - drums
- Zoltán Kőváry - guitars
- Imre Poniklo - vocals and guitars

Additional musicians

- Dávid Vesztergombi - cello
- Tímea Kerekes - viola
- Dóra Maros - violin
- Györgyi Tihanyi - violin

Production

- Robin Guthrie - mixing
- Gábor Deutsch - mixing
- Jácint Jiling - mastering
