= Karthago (band) =

Hungarian musical group

Karthago is a Hungarian rock band, one of the most popular during the eighties, playing American-style west coast rock (AOR).

Disambiguation with the early 70s German band Karthago

== Band history ==
The band was founded in 1979 by Ferenc Szigeti, releasing their self-titled debut album in 1981, which sold 178.000 copies and established the band's fame. After winning an international contest in Austria, they got a two-record deal for Western Europe. They toured Austria, East Germany and other Soviet Bloc countries. The band broke up in 1985 but in they reunited for a concert at Petőfi Csarnok, Budapest in 1990, followed by two others in 1997 and 2000. The band then started a 15-stop tour in 2003, culminating in their first new album after 19 years. They have been active since then, performing often all around Hungary.

== Members ==
- Attila Gidófalvy - keyboards, vocals
- Zoltán 'Zéró' Kiss - bass, vocals,
- Ferenc Szigeti - bandleader, guitars, vocals,
- Miklós Kocsándi - drums, vocals
- Tamás Takáts - vocals, front member, harmonica, drums

== Discography ==
- Karthago (1981)
- 1...2...3...Start! - Popmajális (concert recording) (1982)
- Ezredforduló (1982)
- Requiem (English) (1983)
- Senki földjén (1984)
- Oriental Dream (English) (1985)
- Aranyalbum (selection) (1990)
- Best of Karthago (selection) (1993)
- Haminyó anyó (EP) (1997)
- A Karthago él (concert recording) (1997)
- ValóságRock (2004)
- Időtörés (2009)
- 30 éves Jubileumi Óriáskoncert (2010)
- Együtt 40 éve!!! (2019)

== Sources ==
- Band history on the official page
- On the way of our Fathers
