= The Idoru =

Hungarian post-hardcore band

- Origin: Budapest, Hungary
- Genres: Post-hardcore, punk-rock
- Years active: 2003–present
- Labels: EDGE; Burning Season; Deadbutcher Records
- Members: Tibor Szalkai; András Bödecs; Mátyás Mohácsi; Gergő Varga; Márió Szirota
- Past members: Gábor Nagy; László Szabó; Máté Ács; Ádám Fellegi; Máté Kocsis; József Szolga; Balázs Pásztóy; Denis Valach
- Website: Facebook

The Idoru is a post-hardcore band from Budapest, Hungary. It was formed in 2003 by ex-members of the band Newborn. The original line-up consisted of Tibor Szalkai (guitars), Gábor Nagy (guitars), Mátyás Mohácsi (bass), Denis Valach (drums) and András Bödecs (vocals). However, three of the original members (Bödecs, Szabó and Mohácsi) left the band in 2009.

Their first demo recording After the Storm was released in 2003. The Idoru gained popularity with the success of their song "Monochrome" from the third studio album Monologue. The band has performed numerous events worldwide and was twice the winner of the national Hungarian Music Awards (Fonogram) for "Best Hard Rock/Metal Album of the Year" in 2010 and 2012, respectively. After a multi-year hiatus they reformed in the early 2020s. They have released six full-length albums as of 2024.

== Band members ==
Current members

- Tibor Szalkai – lead guitar (2003–2014, 2019–present)
- András Bödecs – vocals (2003–2009, 2019–present)
- Mátyás Mohácsi – bass (2004–2009, 2019–present)
- Gergő Varga – guitar (2022-present), bass (2013–2014)
- Márió Szirota – drums (2024-present)

Former members

- Gábor "Big" Nagy – guitar (2003–2014, 2019–2022)
- László Szabó – drums (2004–2009, 2019–2024)
- Máté Ács – bass (2003–2004)
- Ádám Fellegi – drums (2003–2004)
- Máté Kocsis – drums (2009–2014)
- József Szolga – vocals (2009–2014)
- Balázs Pásztóy – bass (2009–2013)

== Discography ==
Studio albums

- After the Storm (demo, 2003)
- Brand New Way, Brand New Situation (2004)
- Monologue (2007)
- Face The Light (2009)
- Time (2011)
- Time (Special Edition) (2012)
- Undertow (2024)

Singles and EPs

- Hopeless Illusions (EP, 2006)
- Modern Rock Split (EP, 2010)
- Old Songs (EP, 2020)
- "So Kind, Yet So Cruel" (single, 2021)
- "The Loneliest Drive" (single, 2022)
- "One Word" (single, 2022)

== Awards ==
- 2010 – The Fonogram Music Award for "Best Hard rock/Metal Album of the Year", album Face The Light.
- 2012 – The Fonogram Music Award for "Best Hard Rock/Metal Album of the Year", album Time.
