= The Puzzle (band) =

Hungarian indie rock band

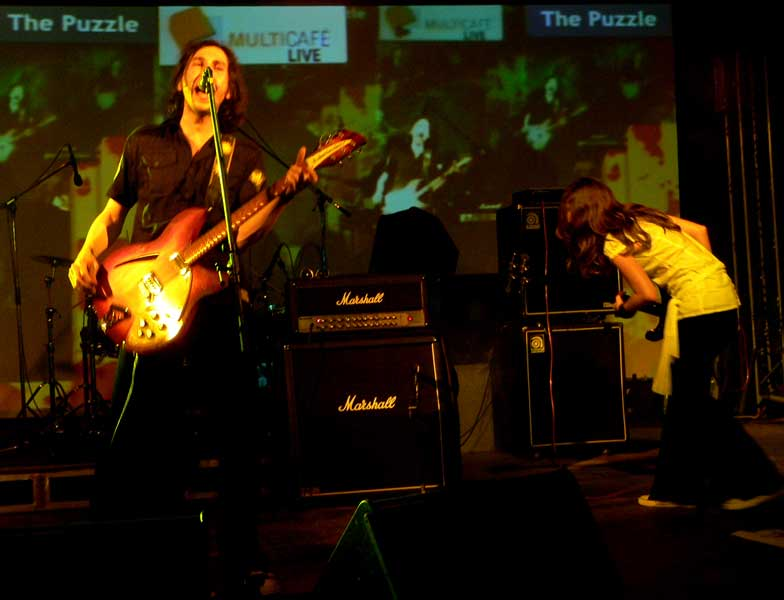

Background information
- Origin: Budapest, Hungary
- Genres: Indie rock
- Years active: 1997–present
- Labels: Universal Music Group
- Members: György Ligeti; Zsuzsanna Horvai; Tamás Faragó; Attila Reigler

The Puzzle is a Hungarian indie rock band based in Budapest but originally from Kaposvár, Hungary. They were one of the first bands from Hungary who settled down outside their native country to try to promote their band. They moved to London, United Kingdom, in 2004 after releasing their first record, Dream Your Life.

== History ==
The Puzzle was formed in Kaposvár in 1997. They started gigging with playing in small clubs, then bigger festivals in Hungary. In 2000 they released their first demo entitled Dream Your Life which received mainly positive reviews, but the real breakthrough happened in the summer of 2000. The Puzzle won the first prize on "Pepsi Starmaker" Competition: a record deal with Universal Music Hungary. The recordings had started in December 2000, but due to the poor conditions of the Hungarian record industry it broke off soon after.

After almost 3 years The Puzzle finalized the album, which was finally released in 2003 October by Universal Hungary. By that time the band knew that it's impossible to reach success with such kind of music in Hungary, therefore they decided to start again right from the beginning, but not in Hungary though in London, United Kingdom.

In early 2004 began recording their latest demo (called "Noitulove"), they decided to risk all by leaving Hungary and move to London.

In 2005 the band was looking for any kind of cooperations with labels, whilst at the same time they were trying to build a profile with starting to play gigs around the UK. The Puzzle benefits from the support of British Council Hungary and the Association of the Arts Unions Bureau for the Protection of Performers' Rights, who were supporting the band both promotionally and financial wise. There was also a great hope that simultaneously as Hungary joined the European Union in 2005 there could be a Hungarian band who could finally reach international success at a certain level.

At the same time right after settling down in London and announcing their first gigs in the UK, an independent promotional company featured and rated the guys as Band of the Week on the Glasswerk music portal.

== Discography ==
Albums

- Dream Your Life (2000)
- Csak Játék (2003)
- rEvolution (2004)
- You're So Cruel (2007)
- Hazatérés (2009)
- Más Bolygóról (2011)

== See also ==
- Budapest indie music scene
