= Amber Smith (album) =

Studio album by Amber Smith
- Released: 21 February 2012 (Germany)
- Recorded: 2011
- Studio: Abnormal Studios
- Genre: Indie rock
- Length: 49:00
- Labels: Kalinkaland Records, Germany
- Producer: Amber Smith

Amber Smith chronology
Introspective (2008)	Amber Smith (2012)	Modern (2015)

Singles from Amber Smith
- 1. "Square 1" Released: 3 April 2011

Professional ratings
Review scores
Source	Rating
Lángoló Gitárok	(9/10)
Recorder Blog	(9/10)
Magyar Narancs	(3/5)
Phenomenon	(8/10)

Amber Smith is the fifth studio album recorded by Amber Smith. The album was released on 21 February 2012 by the German Kalinkaland Records. This was the first record with guitarist Gergő Szabados and keyboardist Zalán Póka.

== Track listing ==
1. "Unanswered
2. "Square 1
3. "Bourbon and Soda
4. "Faster Than the Speed of Light
5. "Ise
6. "If I Had A Reason
7. "Your Life Is My Death
8. "Cinnamon In My Pocket
9. "Hong Kong Falls

== Personnel ==
The following people contributed to Amber Smith:

Amber Smith

- Oszkár Ács - bass
- Bence Bátor - drums
- Zalán Póka - keyboards
- Imre Poniklo - vocals and guitars
- Gergely Szabados - additional guitars

Additional musicians and production

- Gábor Cserkész - erhu (5)
- Sándor Dániel - recording
- György Ligeti - mixing
- Enikő Hodosi – vocals (4)
- Eszter Polyák - recording and backing vocals (7)(9)
- George Shilling - mixing (2)
- Dávid Vesztergombi - strings
