= We Are Rockstars (band) =

Hungarian band

- Origin: Budapest, Hungary
- Genres: Indie pop
- Years active: 2009–present
- Labels: Unsigned
- Members: György Ligeti; Tamás Faragó; Tamás Szíjártó; Csaba Kovács
- Website: www.wearerockstarsband.com

We Are Rockstars is a Hungarian indie band based in Budapest, Hungary. The band was formed by György Ligeti (singer-songwriter and guitars), Tamás Faragó (guitar) and Csaba Kovács (drums), however the final line-up was completed only when Tamás Szijártó (keyboards) joined the band in the summer in 2010.

== History ==
The band borrowed their name from the English band Does It Offend You, Yeah?'s We Are Rockstars song. The group plays electronic rock which is flavoured with the sound of the 60s beat pop, 80s synthpop and modern indie rock. Each band member adds his own influences to the final sound of We Are Rockstars. Among their influences are The Beatles, Depeche Mode, Primal Scream or The Killers. The band released their debut album Let it Beat on 22 November 2011 which is also available on iTunes .

== Discography ==
Albums

- Let It Beat (2011)
- Second (2015)
- Lights (2017)

== See also ==
- Budapest indie music scene
