= Zoltán Kőváry =

Hungarian indie musician (born 1974)

- Born: Zoltán Ernő Kőváry; 29 April 1974 (age 52); Budapest, Hungary
- Genres: Garage rock, Indie rock
- Instruments: vocals, guitar
- Years active: 2000–present

Zoltán Ernő Kőváry (born 29 April 1974) is a Hungarian indie musician, best known as the lead singer, songwriter, lyricist, guitarist and of the garage rockband The Trousers. He is an associate professor at the Faculty of Pedagogy and Psychology of the Eötvös Loránd University.

== Early life and personal life ==
Kőváry was born in Békéscsaba, Hungary. He attended the Rózsa Ferenc secondary school. He graduated from the University of Szeged in Hungarian literature and Hungarian language. Later, he obtained a Bachelor of Arts degree from the University of Debrecen in psychology. He specialised in clinical psychology at the Semmelweis University in Budapest.

== Academic career ==
He is an associate professor at the Institute of Psychology of the Department of Clinical Psychology and Addiction at Eötvös Loránd University.

=== Major publications ===
Top five publications based on Google Scholar.

- Psychobiography as a method. The revival of studying lives: New perspectives in personality and creativity research. Europe’s Journal of Psychology 7 (4), 739–777, 2011
- New trends in psychobiography. Springer, 2019
- Life history, clinical practice and the training of psychologists: The potential contribution of psychobiography to psychology as a “rigorous science.” International Journal of Psychology and Psychoanalysis 4 (1), 1–10, 2018
- Kreativitás és személyiség: a mélylélektani alkotáselméletektől a pszichobiográfiai kutatásig. Oriold, 2012
- Psychobiography, self-knowledge and “Psychology as a Rigorous Science”: Explorations in epistemology, clinical practice and university education. New trends in psychobiography, 99–113, 2019

== Amber Smith ==
Kőváry joined the Indie rock band Amber Smith. Kőváry played on two albums of Amber Smith RePRINT and Introspective.

== The Trousers ==
Kőváry is the founding member of the Hungarian indie-garage rock band called, The Trousers.

== Discography ==
With Amber Smith:

- rePRINT (2006)
- Introspective (2008)

With The Trousers:

- Dive insane (2007)
- Planetary process (2008)
- Soul machine (2010)
- Sister Sludge (2012)
- Freakbeat (2013)
- Mother Of Illusion (2015)

== Instruments ==
=== Guitars ===
- Gibson Flying V

=== Effect pedals ===
- Boss DS-2
- Electro-Harmonix Big Muff

=== Amplifiers ===
- Orange

== See also ==
- Budapest indie music scene
- Amber Smith
- The Trousers
