= Orange Amps =

British audio equipment manufacturer

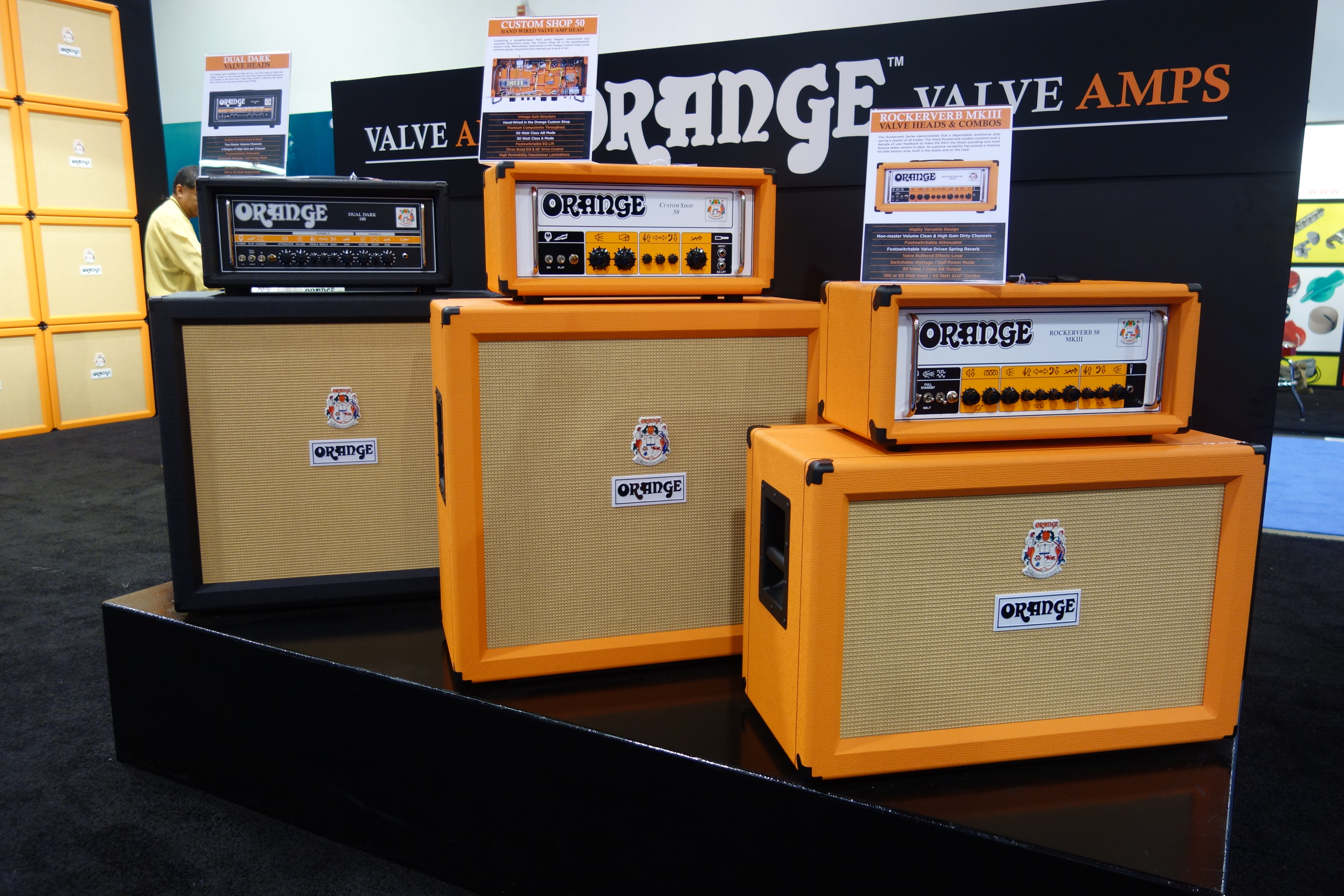
- Type: Independent company
- Founded: 1968; 58 years ago London, England
- Founder: Clifford Cooper
- Headquarters: Borehamwood, England
- Key people: Clifford Cooper (chairman)
- Products: Amplifiers, speaker cabinets
- Owner: Clifford Cooper
- Website: www.orangeamps.com

Orange Amps is an English manufactuer of guitar and bass amplifiers, noted for their distinctive sound and the bright orange Tolex-like covering of their amp heads and speaker cabinets. The company was founded in London in 1968 by Cliff Cooper, who began building his own amplifiers when vendors refused to supply his West End musical instrument store, Orange Store, due to Cooper's youth and countercultural image. Early models were used by Peter Green of Fleetwood Mac and Stevie Wonder, which brought Orange worldwide recognition.

The brand's "Pics Only" models—nicknamed for their use of symbols rather than text on their control panels—were released in the early 1970s to much success and established a signature "Orange sound." However, large-scale production of Orange amplifiers ceased in 1978 and Cooper spent the 1980s building and selling amps in limited numbers.

After a line of reissue models licensed by Gibson in the early 1990s proved unsuccessful, Cooper regained control of the brand and found new success with the 1998 release of the AD30, with notable fans like Jimmy Page. In 2003, Orange released the Rockerverb series, which has become a favorite amp among heavy metal guitarists.

== History ==
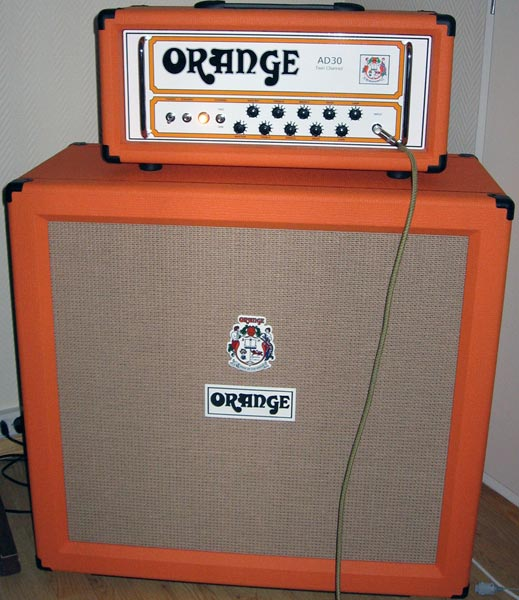
Orange amplifier and speaker with distinctive tolex cabinets.

=== 1960s ===
Orange was founded in 1968 by musician and electronics designer Clifford Cooper in London and opened premises at 3 New Compton Street in London's West End. Initially, Cooper used the basement as a professional recording studio equipped with a former IBC mixing console. Because the studio did not cover its operating costs, the ground-floor premises opened as a music shop on 2 September 1968.

Difficulties obtaining new equipment initially led the Orange Shop to sell second-hand guitars and amplifiers. Cooper subsequently decided to manufacture Orange's own amplifiers, drawing on his electronics background. In autumn 1968, Orange Music appointed Radio Craft, owned by Mat Mathias in Huddersfield, as a subcontractor for amplifier production.

Orange salesman Mick Dines became involved in cabinet design and applied his experience as a touring musician to the construction of the cabinets. The cabinets incorporated features such as basketweave grille cloth and wooden skids intended to improve durability and cabinet coupling with the floor.

The earliest Orange amplifiers were not produced by a company jointly owned by Orange and Matamp; instead, Radio Craft manufactured the amplifiers as a subcontractor to Orange Music. The first amplifiers used the Orange Matamp name after Mathias suggested adding a small Matamp logo to the front panel. Cooper modified the front end of the original Radio Craft design and changed the chassis from aluminium to enamelled steel to obtain a sound more suited to electric lead guitar.

The first Orange amplifiers were assembled in small numbers in the rear of Mathias's tobacconist shop in Huddersfield. As demand increased, Radio Craft could no longer keep up with production requirements. In August 1969, Cooper and Mathias formed Cooper Mathias Ltd., which replaced Radio Craft as Orange's production subcontractor. The Cowcliffe factory opened in early 1970, but production there failed to keep pace with demand and the partnership was subsequently ended.

=== 1970s ===
The Cowcliffe operation was followed by Orange's relocation to premises in London and, in 1973, to a dedicated production facility at Upland Road in Bexleyheath, Kent. The Bexleyheath factory introduced a proper production line and substantially increased manufacturing capacity.

In 1971, Cooper asked the design team to develop graphic symbols for amplifier controls so that their functions could be understood without relying on English-language descriptions. In 1971, Orange engineer John James designed the Graphic Valve Amplifier, which subsequently became known as the Pics Only because of its graphic control panel. The amplifier introduced circuit changes that produced the more overdriven sound associated with Orange's later signature tone.

In 1973, Orange moved production to Bexleyheath, where a larger-scale assembly process was established. The company subsequently redesigned the Pics Only amplifier as the Graphic 120 "Pics & Text", incorporating electronic and front-panel modifications.

Orange introduced the Custom Reverb Twin during the 1970s as a competitor to the Fender Twin Reverb. The model incorporated Hammond spring reverb, tremolo and a master volume, and was initially produced as a 50-watt amplifier before a 100-watt version followed.

By the middle of the 1970s, Orange had established itself as a valve-amplifier manufacturer and began developing solid-state products. The company formed Orange Music Electronic Company (OMEC) and developed the OMEC Digital amplifier using early SSI and MSI logic technology. The OMEC Digital was launched in 1975 and is described by Orange as the first digitally programmable amplifier. Although it used digital control circuitry, the audio signal path remained analogue because practical digital signal processing was not yet available. The amplifier could store and recall settings, but its TTL-based memory consumed substantial power and required a backup battery to retain settings after power loss.

Orange continued developing solid-state amplifiers during the second half of the 1970s, including the Jimmy Bean and other models derived from technology developed for the OMEC project. During this period, Orange expanded its product range to include both guitar and bass amplification and other sound-reinforcement equipment.

By the late 1970s, Orange redesigned the appearance of its amplifier range, replacing the earlier psychedelic typography with a more modern typeface and modifying the cabinet and grille design. The company also divided its catalogue into Orange Instrument Amplification and Orange Sound Reinforcement, the latter covering products such as PA systems, mixing desks and solid-state power amplifiers.

The Orange Shop closed in 1978 when the New Compton Street buildings were demolished. Production at the Bexleyheath factory ended in 1979 after two major overseas distributors entered liquidation within a short period.

=== 1980s ===
During the 1980s, Orange production became extremely limited, with Clifford Cooper continuing to build and sell amplifiers in small quantities.

=== 1990s ===
==== The Orange Gibson Years 1993–1997 ====
Following Mat Mathias's death in 1989, his sons Peter and Richard continued operating Matamp until the company was sold in 1992. In 1993, Gibson licensed the Orange name to manufacture amplifiers and arranged for production to take place at Matamp in Huddersfield. The first Gibson-era Orange reissues were released in 1994 and included the Graphic 120 and Overdrive 120, followed by the Graphic 80 and Overdrive 80.

The 1990s reissues differed electronically from the original 1970s Pics & Text amplifiers, including changes to the values of capacitors in the equalisation section. A small number of Super Bass 120 reissues were also produced using the circuit of the 1979 Series Two Super Bass. The Gibson-era reissues were not commercially successful enough for the licence to continue, and Gibson returned the Orange name to Clifford Cooper in February 1997.

==== 1997–1999 ====
After Orange returned to Cooper's control, Adrian Emsley became technical director and worked on updating the company's amplifier range. Noel Gallagher had used Orange amplifiers with Oasis and requested additional crunch from his existing equipment. Orange subsequently modified the Overdrive circuit, including the phase inverter and preamp, and incorporated Gallagher's requested changes into the development of the OTR amplifier.

In 1998, Orange launched the AD Series, which included the AD30, AD30R and AD15 models. The AD Series marked Orange's renewed expansion following the company's return to Cooper's control. The AD15 subsequently received an Editor's Pick Award from Guitar Player magazine in 1999.

=== 2000s ===
During the 2000s, Orange expanded its product range and international operations:

- In 2001, Orange expanded its United States operations with offices in Atlanta, Georgia.
- In 2006, Orange launched the Tiny Terror, a compact valve amplifier that became one of the company's best-known modern models.
- In 2008, Orange marked its 40th anniversary with a limited production of 40 Custom Shop amplifiers.
- In 2009, Orange moved its headquarters to a larger facility in Borehamwood, Hertfordshire. The new facility housed the Orange Custom Shop and supported research and development activities, including work on the Tiny Terror and isobaric bass cabinet designs.
- In 2010, Orange developed the OPC, a personal computer intended for musicians and home-studio users. The company also expanded manufacturing operations in China during this period.
- In 2018, Orange marked the fiftieth anniversary of its founding.

== Characteristics ==
Orange amplifiers are produced in both valve and solid-state configurations, with specifications varying according to the model and series. Valve models commonly use ECC83/12AX7 valves in their preamplifier stages and EL84 or EL34 valves in their power-amplifier stages. The OR15, for example, uses three ECC83/12AX7 valves in its preamplifier and two EL84 valves in its power amplifier. The TH100 uses four ECC83/12AX7 valves in its preamplifier and four EL34 valves in its power amplifier.

Output power varies substantially between models and can be switchable on some amplifiers. The OR15 provides selectable outputs of 15 or 7 watts RMS, while the OR30 provides 30 or 2 watts. Higher-powered models such as the OR100 and TH100 provide up to 100 watts, with selectable lower-power settings. Orange valve amplifiers are available with single-channel and two-channel configurations. The OR15 has a single channel with gain, bass, middle, treble and volume controls, while the TH100 has separate clean and dirty channels.

Tone-control configurations vary between models. The OR15 provides a three-band equalizer consisting of bass, middle and treble controls, while the OR30 additionally includes a presence control and a three-position bright switch. The TH100 uses separate controls for its clean and dirty channels, including volume, bass, treble, gain and shape controls. Many Orange valve amplifiers incorporate effects loops, including valve-buffered designs. The OR15 uses an ECC81/12AT7 valve for its effects loop, while the TH100 uses another ECC81/12AT7 for the same function. Speaker-output configurations depend on the amplifier. The OR15 supports one 16-ohm cabinet, one 8-ohm cabinet or two 16-ohm cabinets. The TH100 and OR100 provide equivalent combinations of 16-ohm and 8-ohm cabinet connections.

Orange also manufactures solid-state amplifiers. The Gain Baby 100 uses a Class A/B solid-state power stage and a single-ended JFET preamplifier, while providing two channels, a buffered effects loop and a built-in VCA compressor on its clean channel. It produces 100 watts RMS into 8 ohms or 70 watts into 16 ohms. The company's solid-state range also includes the Pedal Baby 100, a 100-watt Class A/B power amplifier designed for use with pedalboards, preamps and modelling equipment. It provides bass, treble and volume controls and produces 100 watts at 8 ohms or 70 watts at 16 ohms.

== Legacy companies ==
=== Orange Studios ===
Before Orange Amps, there was Orange Studios. Cliff Cooper built the studio with his friend Brian Hatt over the course of the summer, hand-cutting, stripping, and soldering every wire. "Our basement studio had a great vibe," Cooper recounts, "It was very large and, as nobody lived or worked on either side, volume wasn't an issue. Most bands preferred to come in for night sessions."

=== Orange Hire ===
Orange Hire was created to provide the PA and backline for larger venues and outdoor summer festivals such as Reading and the Isle of Wight. A fleet of Mercedes 405D vans were converted into state-of-the-art hire vehicles all were radio equipped and had full amp repair facilities fitted. In 1972, Orange Hire was awarded the contract to provide PA equipment for music at the Olympic Games in Munich.

=== Orange Management ===
Orange Management was formed in 1969 signing up artists such as John Miles, Smokie, Nigel Benjamin (ex Mott The Hoople) and his band English Assassin, Cock Sparrer and The Realistics amongst others. Not limited to musical artists, in 1971 motorcycle stunt rider and model Eddie Kidd was signed to Orange Management.

=== Orange Records ===
While the studio recorded demos, artists found it difficult to secure a record deal. This led to the establishment of the Orange record label in 1969. A pressing and distribution deal was signed with Pye Records for the UK in 1972 and soon afterwards for other territories. The "Voice of the World" logo of an Orange tree sitting upon a globe was used for the label with a full colour sleeve; however, with the flower power movement waning, it was decided in the early 1970s to change the look to a black background with gold lettering.

=== Orange Publishing ===
Orange publishing was formed in 1969. Former Head of Copyright at EMI, Dennis Sinnott was appointed by Cliff Cooper to establish Orange Publishing and over the next five years signed a variety of bands including Cock Sparrer, The Little Roosters, The Tremeloes and Kenny Ball. Many of whom had records out on the Orange label. Orange Publishing, (now known as Orange Songs.) has a large catalogue with numerous copyrights, including the Grand Rights to several musicals and film scores.

=== Orange Agency ===
Orange Agency was also formed in 1969 as a means to tie together all Orange music related activities. Working from premises at 4 New Compton Street bands and artists were booked into venues around the UK. Joe Cocker was booked into The Pheasantry Club in London's King's Road in Chelsea, which resulted in Orange Agency becoming the sole booking agents for the venue. Bookings for The Marquee and other famous London venues followed the business grew rapidly and began booking tours, flying in acts from America to tour throughout Europe.

== Notable users ==
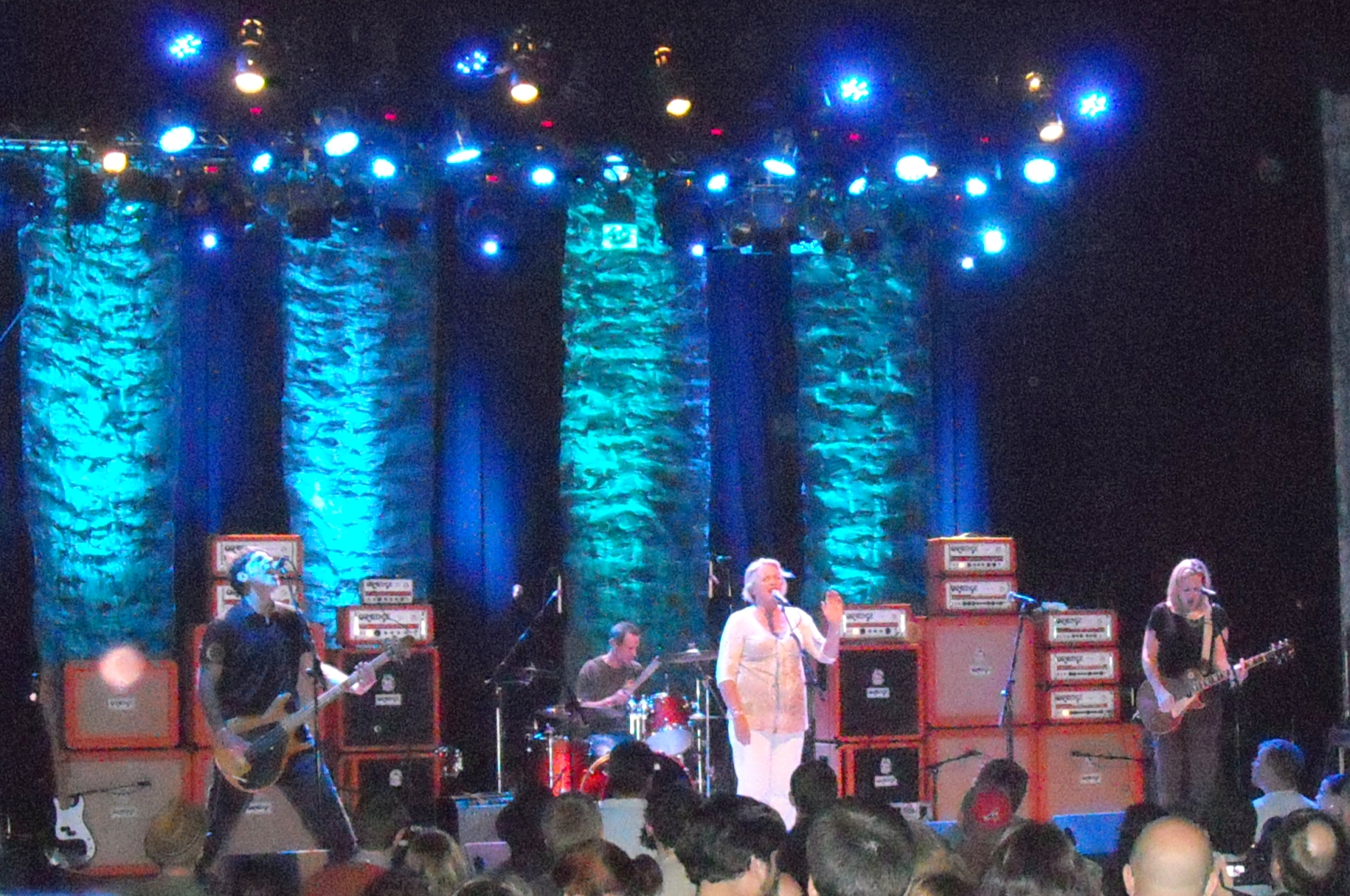
Power pop/punk band Magnapop play with stacks of Orange amps in 2011

Orange amplifiers have been used by musicians from a range of genres, including rock, blues, indie, punk and metal.

Jimmy Page began using Orange amplifiers in the 1970s alongside other amplifiers and continued to use Orange equipment during subsequent performances, including Led Zeppelin's 2007 reunion concert at the O2 Arena in London. Orange's artist archive lists Page with the Rockerverb 100 MKIII and PPC412 cabinet.

Noel Gallagher used Orange amplifiers during the early Oasis period and requested additional crunch from his existing Orange equipment in the late 1990s. The modifications made in response to Gallagher's requirements formed the basis of the OTR amplifier. Gallagher subsequently used Orange OTR amplifiers during the recording and touring period surrounding Oasis's 1997 album Be Here Now.

Jim Root of Slipknot has used Orange amplifiers including the Rockerverb 100 MKIII and has also had signature Orange products developed in collaboration with the company. His signature equipment included the Signature #4 Jim Root Terror Head and Signature #4 Jim Root PPC212 cabinet.

Brent Hinds of Mastodon is among the metal musicians documented by Orange as users of the company's equipment. Orange's artist archive also lists Sleep, High on Fire, Boris, Earthless, Enslaved and Skindred among its metal and heavy-rock artists.

Justin Lockey of Editors has used the Rockerverb 100 MKIII, which is listed among the band's Orange equipment. Everything Everything has also used Orange equipment, including Rocker 32 and AD200 amplifiers and an OBC810C cabinet.

Other musicians documented by Orange as users include Marcus King, Ed Sheeran, Orianthi, Jared James Nichols and Jack Garratt. The company's current artist archive also includes bands such as IDLES, Turnstile, Mastodon, Mdou Moctar and A Pale Horse Named Death.

== See also ==
- Vintage musical equipment
