= Heaven Street Seven =

Hungarian musical group

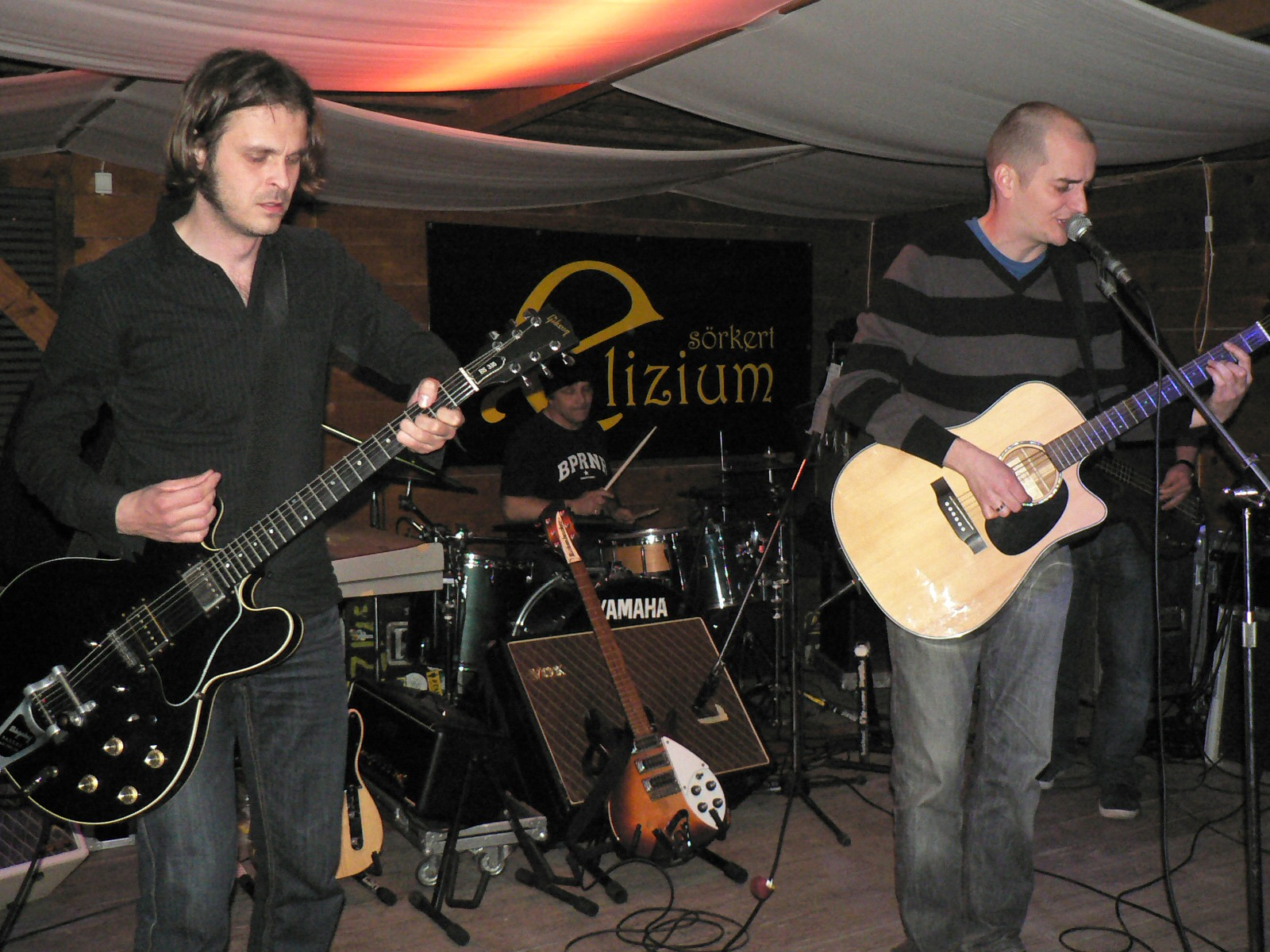

Background information
- Origin: Esztergom, Hungary
- Genres: Alternative rock, indie rock
- Years active: 1995–2015
- Labels: 1G Records
- Members: Zsolt Ábrahám; Róbert Németh; Gyula Orbán; Krisztián Szűcs; Zoltán Takács
- Past members: Szilárd Balanyi; Gábor Balczer; Endre Kiss
- Website: http://www.hs7.hu/

Heaven Street Seven (also known as HS7) was a Hungarian alternative rock band founded in 1995 by Krisztián Szűcs, Róbert Németh and Gyula Orbán. Later that year Gábor Balczer joined the band.

== History ==
In 2006 Heaven Street Seven won an EBBA Award. Every year the European Border Breakers Awards (EBBA) recognize the success of ten emerging artists or groups who reached audiences outside their own countries with their first internationally released album in the past year.

== Discography ==
Albums

- Tick Tock No Fear (1995)
- Goal (1997)
- Budapest Dolls (1998)
- Cukor (2000)
- Kisfilmek a nagyvilágból (2002)
- Szállj ki és gyalogolj (2004)
- Tick Tock No Fear (2005)
- Tudom, hogy szeretsz titokban (2006)
- Sordid Little Symphonies (2007)
- Jazz (2008)

== See also ==
- Budapest indie music scene
- Zoltán Takács
