= Dawnstar (band) =

Hungarian indie-rock band

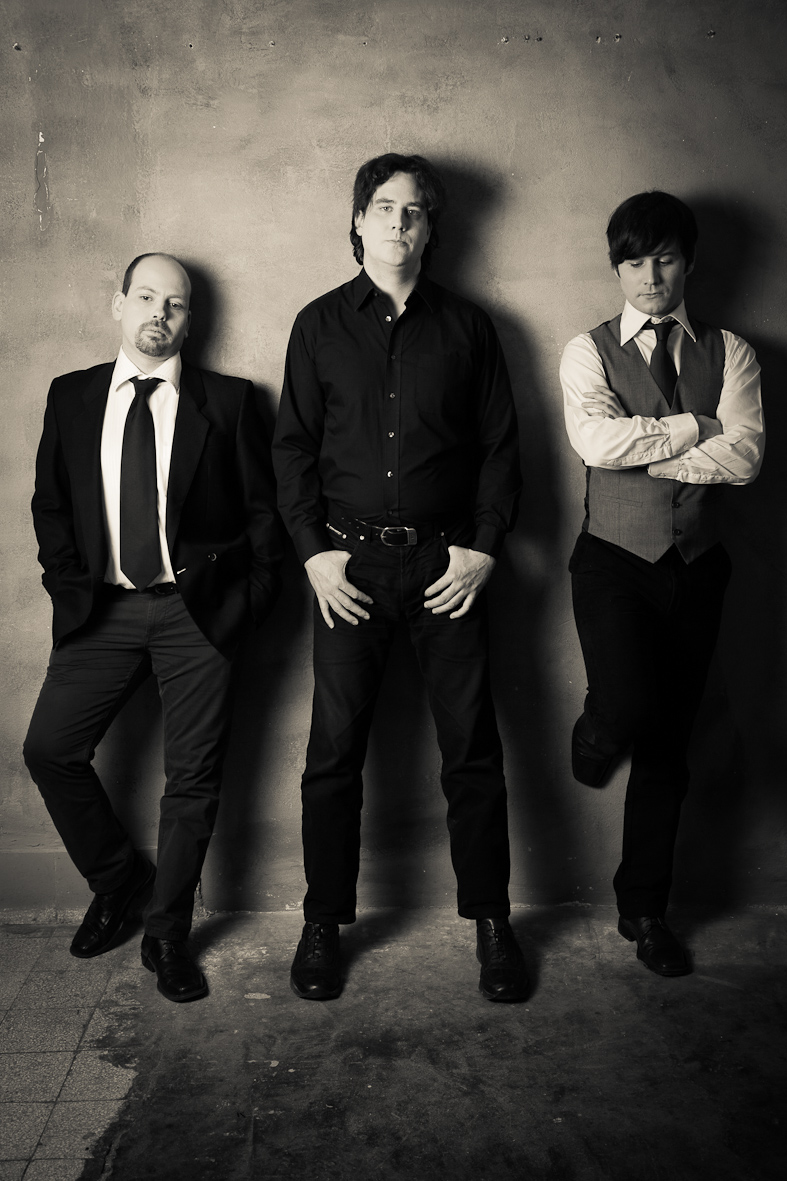

Background information
- Origin: Budapest, Hungary
- Genres: Grunge, Psychedelic rock, Gothic rock, Indie rock
- Years active: 2001-2003, 2005-
- Members: Viktor Albert; Bálint Hamvas; Attila Wind
- Past members: Zsombor Havass; Anna Mitropulos; Zsolt Szemenyei
- Website: Official website

Dawnstar are an indie-rock band from Budapest, Hungary. The band's original line-up includes the songwriter Attila Wind (vocals/guitars), Bálint Hamvas (bass), and Viktor Albert (drums). The sound of the band is generally a mix of flanging and light distorted guitars, throbbing bass, and enchanting keyboard melodies. Dawnstar represents a mixture of mid-1960s psychedelic, late 1970s goth, mid-1980s grunge and 1990s indie rock of the Budapest indie music scene.

== History ==
=== Formation ===
Wind, born to an English father from Sunderland and Hungarian mother from Budapest, met Hamvas in the mid-1990s at the Teleki Blanka Gymnasium in Budapest, Hungary. In 1999 they formed Ansellia, named after the eponymous orchid, as a duo project and recorded their first demo, Eunomia. In 2000 Wind composed eight new tracks which were recorded in Piliscsaba. This demo entitled Vanity helped the band recruit Albert who was Hamvas's classmate at the Budapest Business School. After several concerts at local clubs, in spring 2001 the band started using the name Dawnstar, which is a combination of ″dawn″ and ″star″ as an alternative for Morning Star or Venus, instead of Ansellia. They gave their first concert with this new name on 13 December 2002 at the Woodoo club in Csepel. The early sound of the band was influenced by the grunge revolution from Seattle. However, later the band started to mix their sound with many different music genres such as psychedelia, post-punk and garage rock. In 2002 Dawnstar recorded their third demo, Under Your Wings, at the Pick-up Studios in Budapest. The result was a mixture of flanging verses and distorted choruses establishing the distinctive sound of the band.

=== Hiatus ===
The band were on hiatus from 2003 to 2005 due to the foreign studies of the band members. In 2003 Wind continued his studies at University of Trieste in Italy while Hamvas at the University of Padua in 2004.

On 16 April 2005, Dawnstar performed at the Ecofest, organised to celebrate eco-friendly ideas by the Védegylet. A week before the show, Wind recruited Mitropulos as an additional musician to play the keyboard. Finally, Mitropulos joined Dawnstar as a permanent member in late 2005.

In 2006 Dawnstar recorded their fourth demo entitled A Metrosexual's Confessions.

In 2006 the band played three shows at the Erzsébetliget Theatre in Budapest. Before their third show on 31 November 2006, the band members were interviewed by Beatrice's lead singer Feró Nagy.

On 30 March 2007, Dawnstar performed at the Budapest Fringe Festival.

=== Change The World ===
On 30 November 2007, Dawnstar released their first EP, Change The World, including three songs: the title track Change The World, Scarlet and Don't Die A Martyr For Me. The band opted for Heaven Street Seven's Zoltán Takács and László Philip as the sound engineers for the record. The band spent two days with the recording at the Abnormal Studios in November, 2007.

On 22 January 2017, the band's song entitled Don't Die A Martyr For Me was listed among antiwar songs on the Italian website, Antiwar Songs.

On 6 July 2009, Dawnstar played at the Donaukanaltreiben Festival in Vienna, Austria. The band was spotted on the community website, Myspace by Heidimarie Pyringer, who organised the concert for the band in the Austrian capital.

On 10 April 2010, Dawnstar played at the Fringe Festival in Pécs which was selected to be the European Capital of Culture for the same year. Next year, on 1 April 2011, Dawnstar performed at the Budapest Fringe Festival for the third time.

=== Saturnine Valentines ===
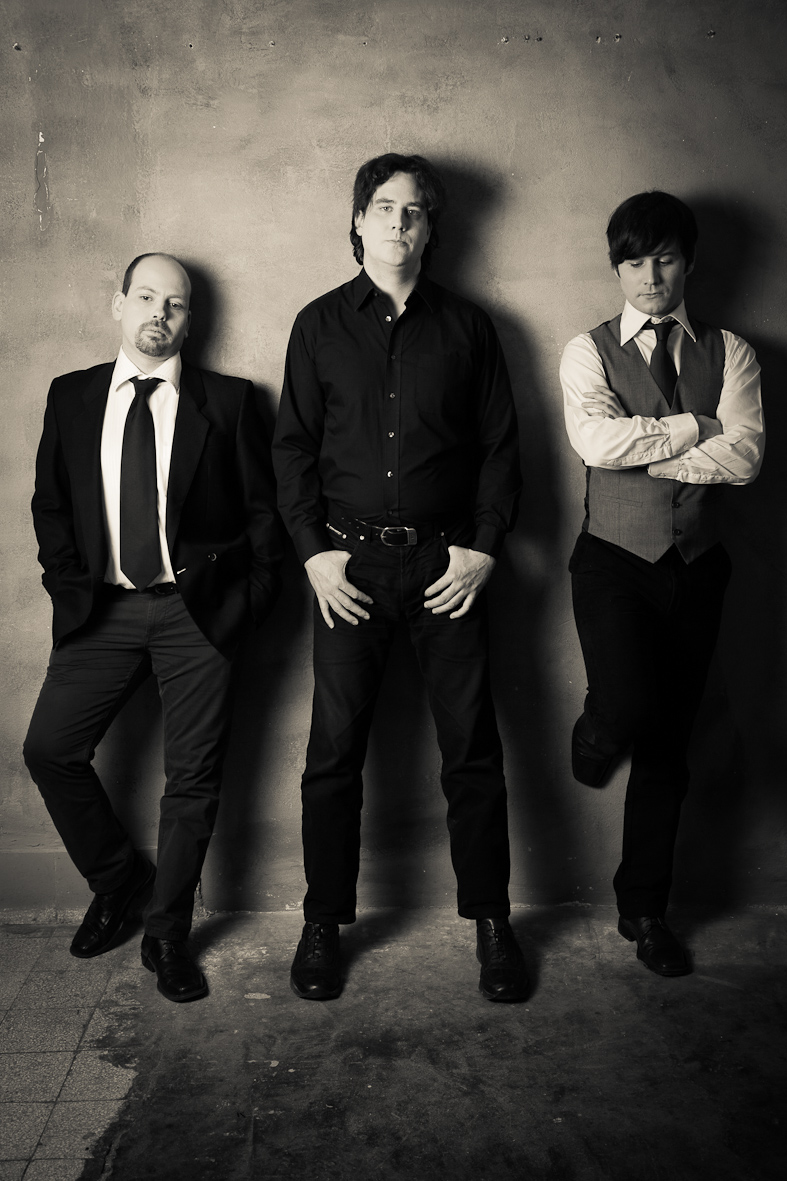
Dawnstar in 2013

In 2012 Dawnstar started recording their first full-length studio album entitled Saturnine Valentines at the Abnormal Studios in Budapest. The band hired Dávid Schram, who previously worked on Shell Beach's This Is Desolation and FreshFabrik's MORA, as mixing and mastering engineer for their album.

On 19 May 2013, Dawnstar uploaded three songs (Love's Gonna Be Tender, In Heaven We Meet Again, Ophelia) from their upcoming studio album on YouTube and SoundCloud and three months later the full record was available on Bandcamp.

In December 2013, Dawnstar was featured on J.D. Doyle's Queer Music Heritage. In the same month Love's Gonna Be Tender was aired on OutRadio.

On 19 January 2016, the band's first video clip, In Heaven We Meet Again, was premiered on Underground Magazin. The video was shot in Üröm in December 2015 and it was directed by Wind. The video was inspired by Daniel Myrick and Eduardo Sánchez's psychological horror movie Blair Witch Project.

On 12 February 2016 the band played a show at Szilvuplé Bár és Varieté in Budapest with three guest vocalist including: Viktória Wind (née Bordács), Zsófia Toporczy (Plüssnapalm), and Viktóra Sereg. This was the first time when guest vocalist were invited to support the band.

On 17 June 2016, Dawnstar released their second video entitled London Nights. In the video Wind is wandering in the streets of London, The United Kingdom passing by some famous sights such as Tower Bridge and St Paul's Cathedral. The other band members, Albert and Hamvas are waiting impatiently for Wind to arrive at the rehearsal room. At the end of the video Wind arrives at the rehearsal room and the band start to play the song together. The London scenes were shot on 13 July 2013, while the rest of the video was filmed in Budapest, Hungary on 22 May 2016.

On 26 August 2016, the band debuted on Rádió Rock 95.8 with their song In Heaven We Meet Again. A couple of days later, on 9 September 2016, another song from Saturnine Valentines, London Nights was also aired on the radio station.

On 17 November 2017, the band played a show entitled Saturnine Nights at the Szilvuplé in Budapest.

On 27 November 2016, the band was interviewed by Ádám Rédl on Rádió Rock 95.8. During the one-hour talk 5 songs were aired on the radio station including Love's Gonna Be Tender, Ophelia, Almost Every Flame Will Fade Away, and two previously played songs: In Heaven We Meet Again and London Nights.

On 13 April 2017, Zsolt Szemenyei joined Dawnstar as a keyboard player.

== Band members ==
Current line-up

- Viktor Albert – drums (2001–)
- Bálint Hamvas – bass guitar, backvocals (2001–)
- Attila Wind – vocals, guitar (2001–)

Former members

- Zsombor Havass – guitar (2006)
- Anna Mitropulos – keyboard (2005–2011)
- Zsolt Szemenyei – keyboard (2017)

Touring members

- Nikolett Poór – cello
- Viktória Wind (née Bordács) – backvocals
- Zsófia Toporczy – backvocals
- Viktória Sereg – backvocals

== Discography ==
Dawnstar discography
- Studio albums: 1
- Extended plays: 1
- Singles: 1
- Music videos: 2

Albums

- Change The World (2007)
- Saturnine Valentines (2013)

Singles

- Love's Gonna Be Tender (2013)

== Videography ==
Music videos

- In Heaven We Meet Again (2016)
- London Nights (2016)

== See also ==
- Budapest indie music scene
