= Donaukanaltreiben Festival =

Cultural festival in Vienna

- Genre: Rock, alternative rock, psychedelic rock, punk rock, heavy metal, pop, synthpop, reggae, hip hop, indie, world, electronic
- Dates: Three days, usually starting in the first week of June
- Locations: Vienna, Austria
- Years active: 2007 – present
- Website: www.donaukanaltreiben.at

Donaukanaltreiben Festival in Vienna, Austria is one of the cultural festivals in Europe. It is held every year in June in several locations along the Donaukanal, in Vienna. Mainly Austrian professional and amateur bands are invited but from year to year the organisers invite bands from the neighbouring countries.

== Locations ==
Location	Year(s)
Adria Wien	2007, 2011, 2012
Badeschiff	2007, 2008, 2011
Central Garden	2008, 2009, 2010, 2011
City Beach	2007, 2008, 2009, 2010, 2011, 2012
Das Dorf	2007
Fernwärme	2009
Flex	2007, 2008, 2009, 2010, 2012
Franzensbrücke	2010, 2012
Ich bin Wien	2010, 2011
Leo's Stage Europe	2008, 2009
Motto am Fluss	2011, 2012
Pier 9	2010, 2011
Riverside	2011, 2012
Summerstage	2007, 2008, 2009, 2010, 2011, 2012
Spittelau 10	2011, 2012
Schützenhaus	2012
Strandbar Herrmann	2007, 2008, 2009, 2010, 2011, 2012
Team for Europa	2009
Telaviv Beach	2009, 2010, 2011, 2012
Wir sind mehr	2012
Young Generation Area	2007

== Previous years ==
No.	Year	Name	Visitors ^{1}	Main artists (in alphabetical order)
1.	2007	Donaukanaltreiben Festival 2007	50,000	(Austria) Attwenger; (Austria) Austrofred; (Austria) Beeswax Polish; (Austria) Caresce; (Austria) DJ DSL; (Austria) Gameboy Music Club; (Austria) Lichtenberg; (Austria) Louie Austin; (Austria) Millions of Dreads; (Austria) Minze; (Austria) Syncope; (Austria) Texta
2.	2008	Donaukanaltreiben Festival 2008	50,000	(Austria) Attwenger; (Austria) Herbstrock; (Austria) The M.A.S.S.; (Austria) Britta; (Austria) Bauchklang; (Austria) Jonas Goldbaum; (Austria) The Mary Broadcast Band
3.	2009	Donaukanaltreiben Festival 2009	50,000	(United Kingdom) (Hungary) Dawnstar; (Austria) Desolate Mind; (Austria) Echo Band; (Austria) Herta 11; (Austria) Jessica Slavik; (Austria) Katzenreich; (Austria) Kocuma; (Austria) Koko Makumba; (Austria) Kommando Elefant; (Austria) Mauracher; (Austria) Ost in Translation; (Austria) Radio Wien Band; (Austria) Rosengarten; (Austria) Scarabeus Dream; (Austria) Stonez; (Austria) Velojet; (Austria) Willi Resetarits
4.	2010	Donaukanaltreiben Festival 2010	50,000	(Austria) Bo Candy and His Broken Hearts; (Austria) Bunny Lake; (Austria) Dolores Schmidinger; (Austria) John Megill; (Austria) Fatima Spar and The Freedom Fries; (Austria) Graffiti Workshop U.V.M.; (Austria) (Greece) Marios and Julie; (Austria) Modenschau; (Austria) Pexus Solarie
5.	2011	Donaukanaltreiben Festival 2011	40,000	(Austria) Bernard Eder; (Austria) Gary; (Austria) Hotel California; (Austria) Modenschau; (Austria) The Billy Rubin Trio; (Austria) The Fussa; (Austria) The Rocking Birds; (Austria) Violetta Parisini; (Austria) Silo feat. Four Elements
6.	2012	Donaukanaltreiben Festival 2012	60,000	(Austria) Aminata and the Astronauts; (Austria) Bootstaxi; (Austria) Christoph and Lollo; (Austria) Dirk Stermann; (Austria) Duscher Plays Cash; (Austria) Effi; (Austria) Frühschoppen; (Austria) Gewinnspiel; (Austria) Giantree; (Austria) Ginga; (Austria) (Greece) Marios and Julie; (Austria) Salsa and Zumba; (Austria) Mika Vember; (Austria) Silo feat. Pebelle
7.	2013	Donaukanaltreiben Festival 2013	TBD	(Austria) Deliman; (Austria) DJ Carlos Futuro; (Austria) Heinz aus Wien; (Austria) James Hersey; (Austria) Kidcat Lofi; (Austria) Kein Sonntag Ohne Techno; (Austria) Keiner Mag Faustmann; (Austria) Mauracher; (Austria) Nana D.; (Austria) Sofa Surfers; (Austria) Stermann

Notes

- Note 1: all days combined
