= Budapest Fringe Festival =

Arts festival in Hungary

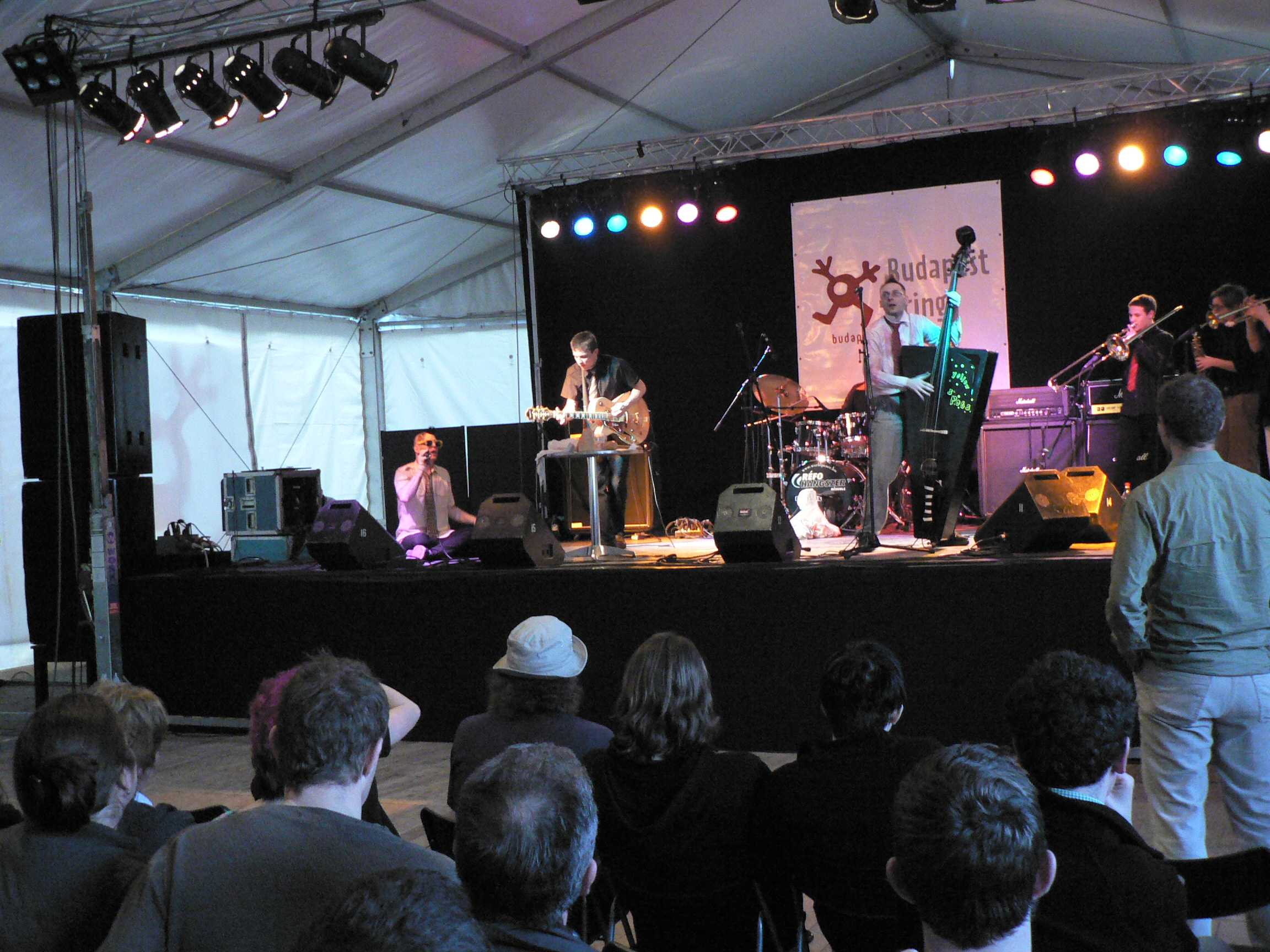
The festival in 2006

The Budapest Fringe Festival is an annual event held every spring in Budapest, Hungary. It is a fringe festival, on the model of the Edinburgh Festival Fringe. The Budapest Fringe Festival was first held in 2006. The festival brings more than 500 artists in about 50 shows to produce a wide range of interesting works in alternative theatre, dance, music and comedy outside the mainstream.

== History ==
The Budapest Fringe Festival was first held between 31 March and 2 April in 2006 in seven different locations in the centre of the Hungarian capital, Budapest.

== Previous years ==
Year	Name	City	Notable acts
2006	Budapest Fringe Festival	Budapest	Andro Drom (music); Canarro (music); Porfundo (music); Studio Tanze (dance)
2007	Budapest Fringe Festival	Budapest	Dawnstar (music); Veronika Harcsa (music)
2008	Budapest Fringe Festival	Budapest	4 for dance (dance); Beat Dis (music); Manökken Proletárz(music); Metrosection (music); Myzrab (music); Nulladik Változat (music)
2009	Budapest Fringe Festival	Budapest	collection of previous performances
2010	Pécs Fringe Festival	Pécs	
2011	Budapest Fringe Festival	Budapest	Art-Studio (theatre); Dawnstar (music); Fakutya (folk music); Flame Flowers (performance); Indygo (music); Liszt Ferenc Academy of Music (music); Manökken Proletárz(music); Tánc együttes (dance); Virgo (music)
2012	Kecskemét Fringe Festival	Kecskemét	
