= Sexepil =

Hungarian rock band

- Origin: Budapest, Hungary; London, United Kingdom
- Genres: Alternative rock
- Years active: 1984–1996, 2001–present
- Label: Warner Bros. Records
- Members: Ábrahám Zsolt; Tamás Kocsis; Tibor Vangel
- Past members: László Viktor; Mick Ness; Csaba Mosonyi; János Fazekas; Miklós Csala; Zoltán Farkas; Gábor Varga; Judit Lorincz; Zoltan Hegyi

Sexepil is a Hungarian indie-alternative rock band based in Budapest, Hungary. The band was formed by Zoltán Hegyi, Viktor László, Tamás Kocsis, and Tibor Vangel in 1984.

== Etymology ==
Sexepil was originally written as Sex-E-Pil and it is a portmanteau of the English punk band, Sex Pistols and the abbreviation of Johnny Rotten's Public Image Ltd.

== History ==
Sexepil were formed in 1984 in Budapest, Hungary, on the ruins of notorious punk band ETA (Kocsis, László) and art rock formation ZOO (Hegyi, Vangel). Within virtually a few months after their first gig the band achieved cult status, playing for packed houses every weekend around the Hungarian capital's famous clubs. Their influences ranged from David Bowie to Talking Heads to The Cure and to Joy Division.

=== Egyesült Álmok ===
In 1988, the band's first LP record entitled Egyesült Álmok was released by Ring Records. The LP was released by one of the country's first independent record labels, Ring. Many regard the record as one of the finest albums of that era. Besides gigging throughout Hungary, Sexepil played hugely successful concerts in Kiev, Ukraine and Paris, France. After the departure of the band's original front man and founder lead singer Zoltán Hegyi in 1989, the Dutch Mick Ness took over the singer duties.

=== ...bi... ===
With Ness joining, Sexepil became one of the first English-singing bands in Hungary (the hardcore fans initially reacted with hostility to this fact). The band started playing gigs after just one rehearsal with Ness. After issuing a tape only unique collection of live recordings …bi…, Sexepil released their first English-language album Love Jealousy Hate a year later in 1990 on Polygram's Nature label.

=== Love Jealousy Hate ===
The vinyl was also released in Germany and the Netherlands. Later that year a small Lithuanian label, Zona Records, released the album in the ex-Soviet states that resulted in countless gigs being played in those places. During the summer of 1992 Sexepil played a show in New York City at the annual New Music Seminar. The following winter they went on a tour that covered the Baltic states.

=== Against Nature ===
In 1993, T3 Records released the band's third LP entitled Against Nature. Against Nature included the hit single Eroding Europe which had heavy airplay on Music Television’s 120 minutes, where VJ Paul King cited Sexepil as one of his all time favourite bands. In the same year the band embarked on a triumphant European tour together with Björk's former band, The Sugarcubes. Next spring they performed at the SXSW festival in Austin for the first time.

=== Sugar for the Soul ===
In 1995, Sugar for the Soul was released by Warner Music Group. Sugar for the Soul was recorded in Budapest and mixed in Madison, Wisconsin at the famous Smart Studios. It was mixed and co-produced by Brian Anderson and mastered by Howie Weinberg in New York City and released on Warner Bros. worldwide. One reviewer referred to it as “Beatles in blender”.

After the mixing the band did a mini-tour in the United States and played (again) at the SXSW festival in Austin, Texas as well as the legendary CBGB's in New York City among others. The first single, Jerusalem, and the accompanying video was frequently played on Music Television’s 120 Minutes and Alternative Nation. During the summer they completed a headlining slot at Sziget Festival’s main stage. Later that year they were nominated in three categories for Arany Zsiráf (the Hungarian version of a Grammy): best album, best video clip and best cover art. They won all three categories. Despite this critical success, Sexepil went on hiatus for almost a decade, although they did play at the Sziget Festival in 2001 and 2006.

=== Your Scream Is Music ===
Around 2007 became clear that Mick Ness didn't have the time, affinity or enthusiasm to continue as the band's singer. Mick Ness's last performance with the band happened in February 2007. Sexepil then started looking for a new singer and held auditions as well as listening to endless gigs of young bands in the hope of finding the right person. Eventually they found their man who happened to have been the band's drummer from the start, Tibor Vangel. Band members found a hard drive that belonged to Vangel, containing vocal ideas to new songs that were recorded by the drummer but kept in secret. They persuaded him that he had to switch to singing.

The band started recording in 2008 but for various reasons it took almost 6 years to finally finish their new studio album Your Scream Is Music. (In June 2012, while working on their new album, they played three highly successful gigs in Hungary with their original singer, Zoltan Hegyi The band also played at Volt Festival in Sopron, Hungary.), but then promptly returned to recording and mixing their current material.

The new album was mixed by Dávid Schram and mastered by Gavin Lurssen in Los Angeles. On 11 November 2014, Sexepil uploaded their new single, Rat King, from their upcoming album on YouTube. Your Scream Is Music was released on November 17, 2014 in digital formats. The CD and the double gatefold vinyl followed a month later.

=== The Acoustic Sessions ===
In 2017 Sexepil released an acoustic EP through Hungarian label Grund Records. The EP contains five slightly (or occasionally heavily) re-arranged songs from their rich back catalogue and a previously unreleased song (Disillusion), that was co-written with Mick Ness, the band previous singer. The EP sees guest vocalist Anesz Szalai filling the solo singer duties in two songs. The EP made available on CD/vinyl/digital.

== Band members ==
Current line-up

- Tamás Kocsis - guitars, b. vocals (1984–present)
- Tibor Vangel - drums, vocals, guitars, programming (1984–present)
- Zsolt Ábrahám - guitars (2012, 2016–present)

Former members

- László Viktor - bass, b. vocals (1984–2016)
- Mick Ness - vocal, guitars (1989-2007)
- Zoltán Hegyi - vocal (1984-1989)
- Endre Deák - guitars (2001-2016)
- János Fazekas - guitar (1984-1986)
- Gábor Varga - keyboards, samplers (1991-2001)
- Judit Lőrincz - keyboards (2001-2007)
- Csaba Mosonyi - bass, keyboards (1983-1986)
- Zoltán Farkas - keyboards (1988)
- Miklós Csala - guitar (1986)

Touring members

- Anesz Szalai - vocals (2014-)
- Dávid Nagy - drums (2015-)
- Ákos Örményi - bass (2016-)
- Bence Bátor - drums (2017-)
- Árpád Kiss - trumpet (2015-)
- Zoltán Demeter - bass (2017)
- Ferenc Golovics - drums (2014-2015)

== Discography ==
Sexepil discography
- Studio albums: 6
- EPs: 0
- Singles: 2
- Music videos: 8

Albums

- Egyesült Álmok (Ring, 1988)
- ,,,bi... (cassette only, WeAst, 1990)
- Love Jealousy Hate (Polygram, 1991)
- Against Nature (WeAst,1993)
- Sugar for the Soul (Warner, 1995)
- Your Scream Is Music (2014)
- The Acoustic Sessions (Grund Records, 2017)

Singles

- Jerusalem (1995)

Compilations

- Nap Nap Fesztivál (1992)
- Human Telex (1992)
- Magyar Narancs (1995)
- Biturbo (2006)

Mixes

- Mixepil - The Remixes (Warner, 1997)
- Egyesült Álmok reissue with bonus tracks (1G, 1997, 2009)

== Videos ==
- Igazi Zöld
- Angel
- Somewhere
- Bliss
- Nobody is an Island
- Eroding Europe
- Eroding Europe (XPC Mix)
- Jerusalem
- I Come
- Rat King (2014)
- Dormant (2015)
- Go Away (2016)
- The Wind (2017)
- Your Little Revolution (2017)

== See also ==
- Hungarian alternative
- Hungarian indie
