= Erzsébetliget Theatre =

Theatre in Budapest, Hungary

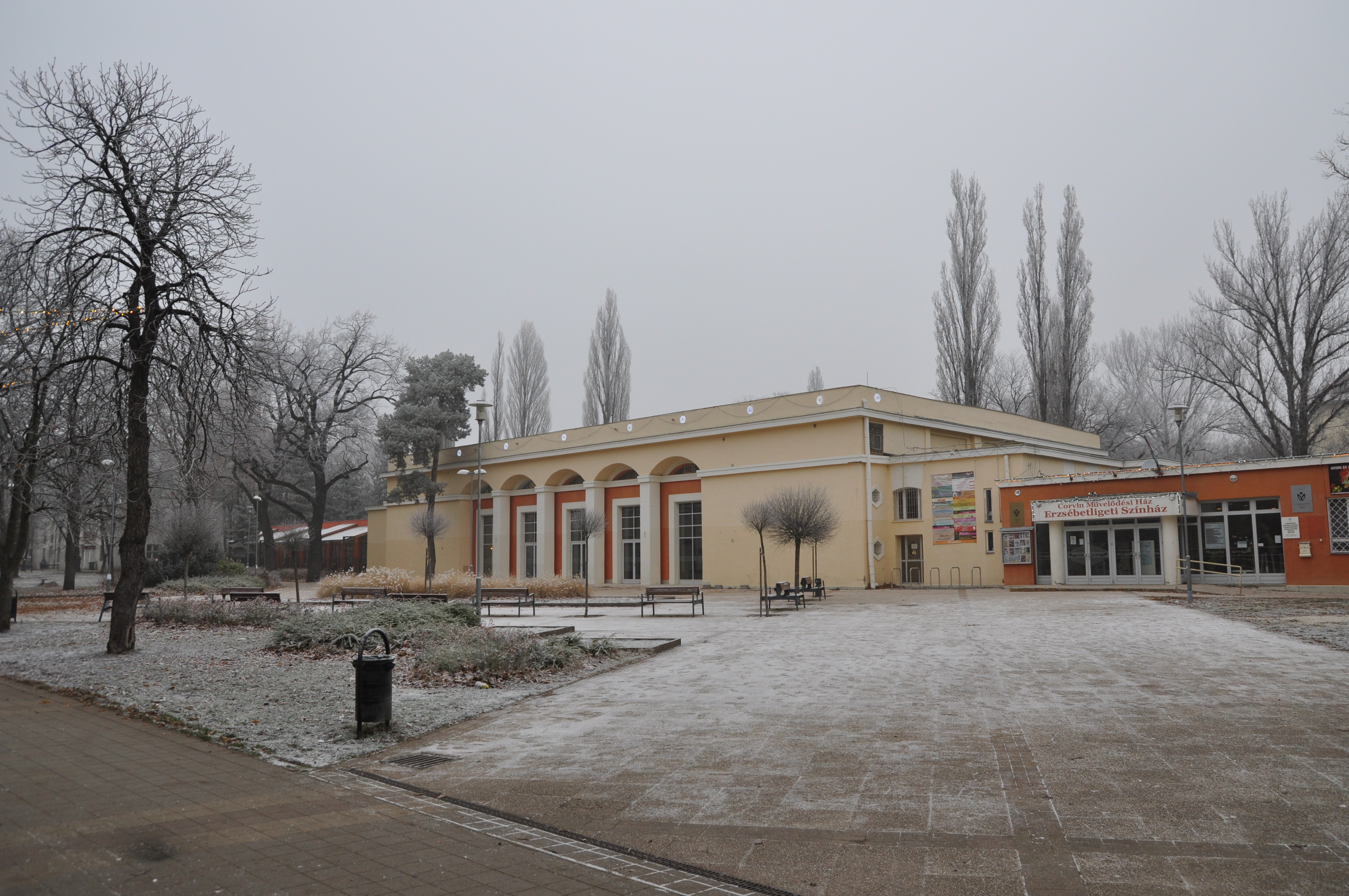
- Interactive map of Erzsébetliget Theatre
- Address: Erzsébetliget
- Location: Budapest, Pest county, Hungary
- Coordinates: 47.50998°N 19.20422°E
- Type: Theatre

Construction
- Built: 1956
- Opened: 1956

Website
- Erzsébetliget Theatre

The Erzsébetliget Theatre (Hungarian: Erzsébetligeti Színház) is a theatre in Mátyásföld, Budapest.

== History ==
The English-Hungarian indie rock band, Dawnstar, played three shows at the theatre in 2006. The third concert was part of Feró Nagy's Rock Klub.

In 2015, the Hungarian rock band Quimby played a show at the theatre.

In 2017 the 28th Junior National Dance festival was held at the theatre by the Táncpedagógusok Országos Szövetsége.

In 2017, the second Vingardium Borliget festival was held at the premises of the theatre.

== Gallery ==
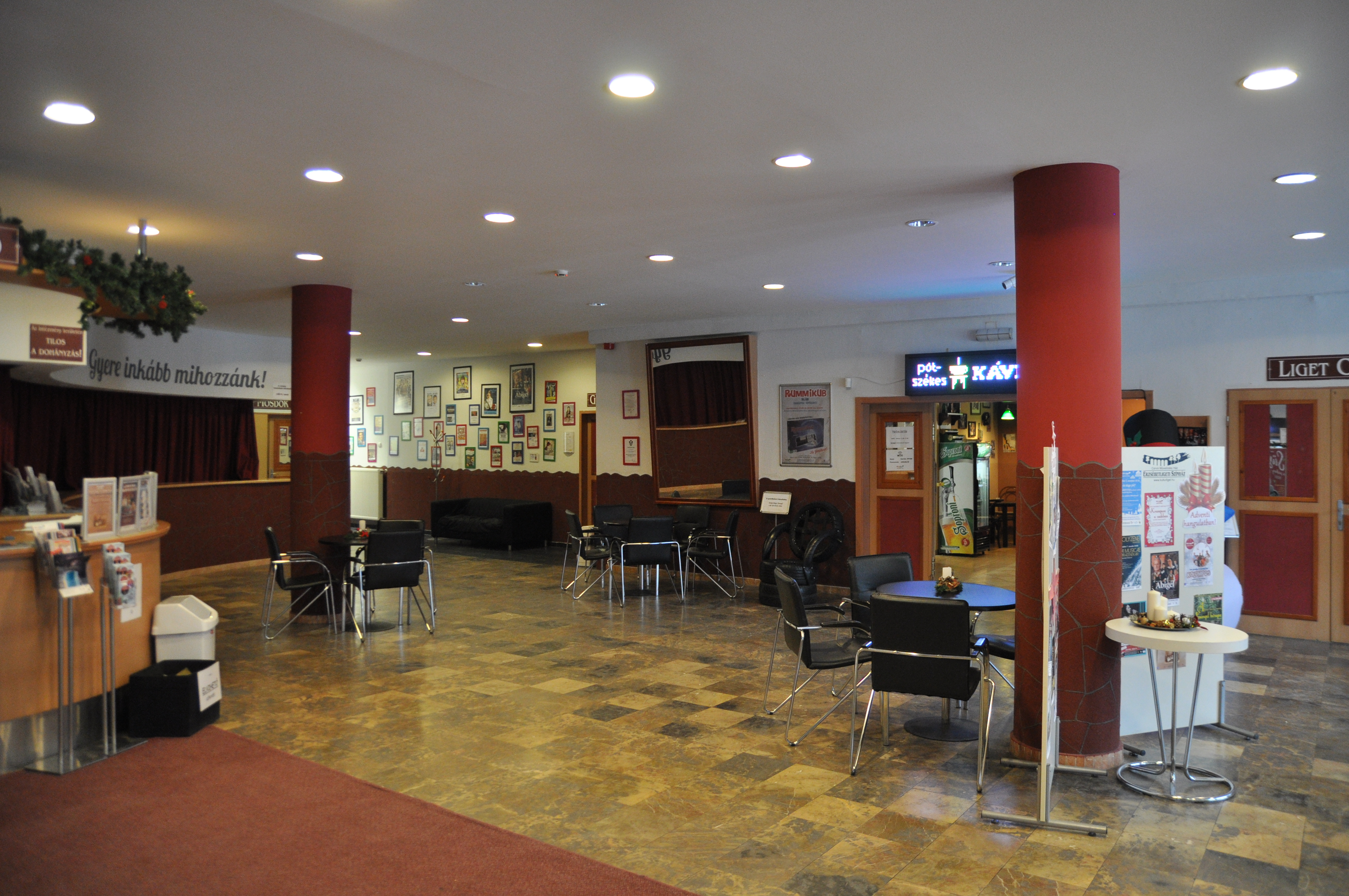

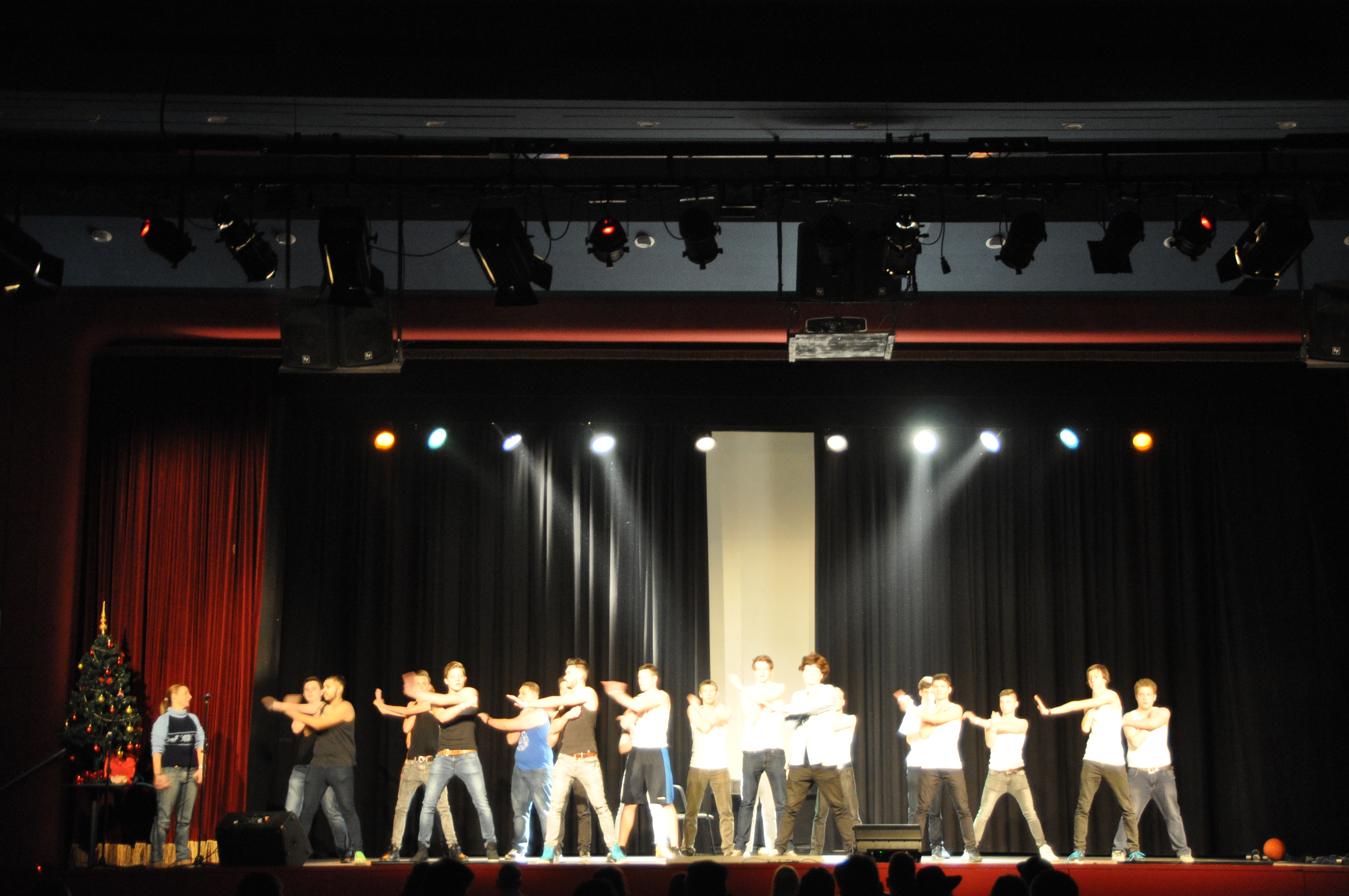

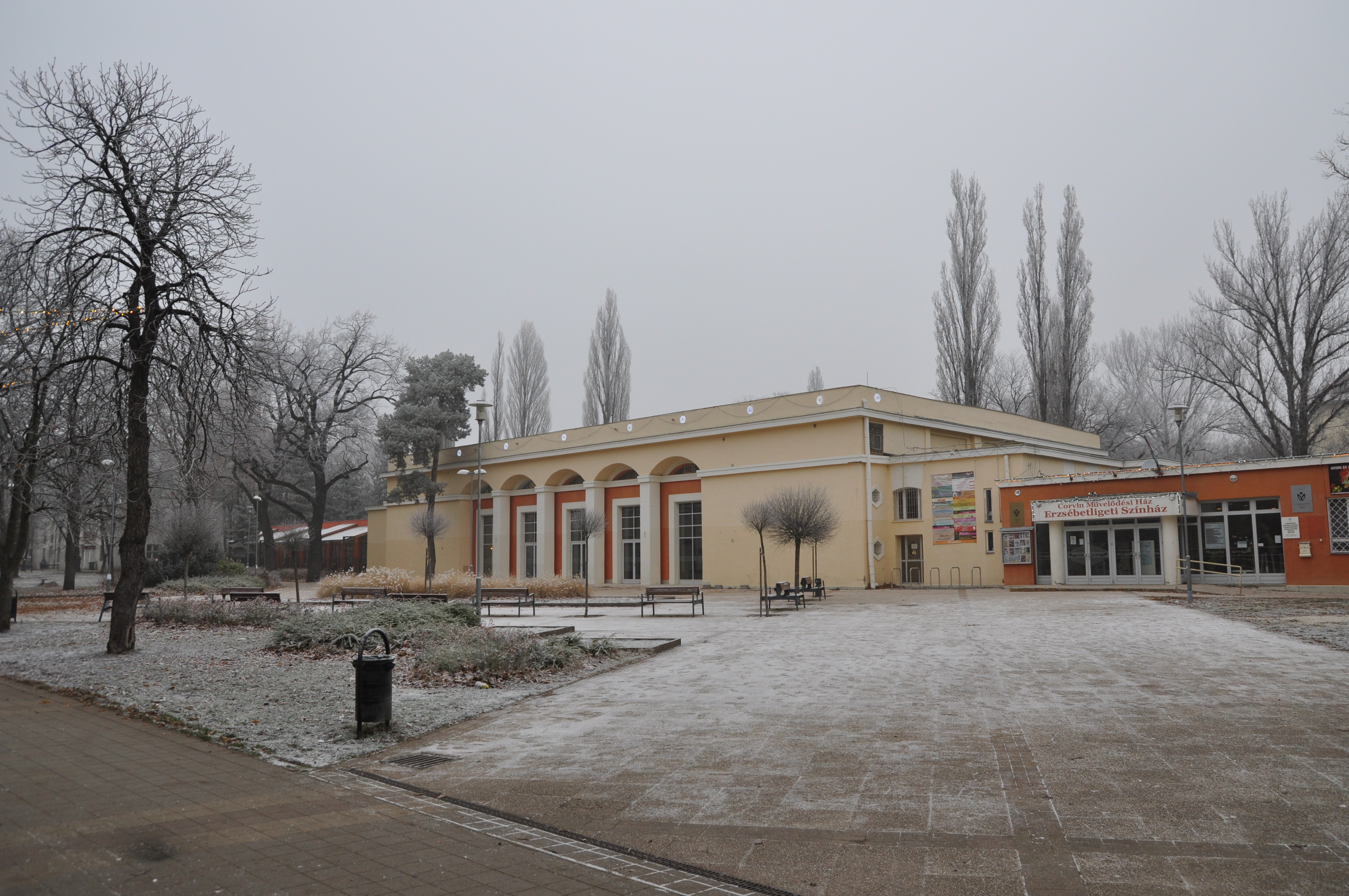

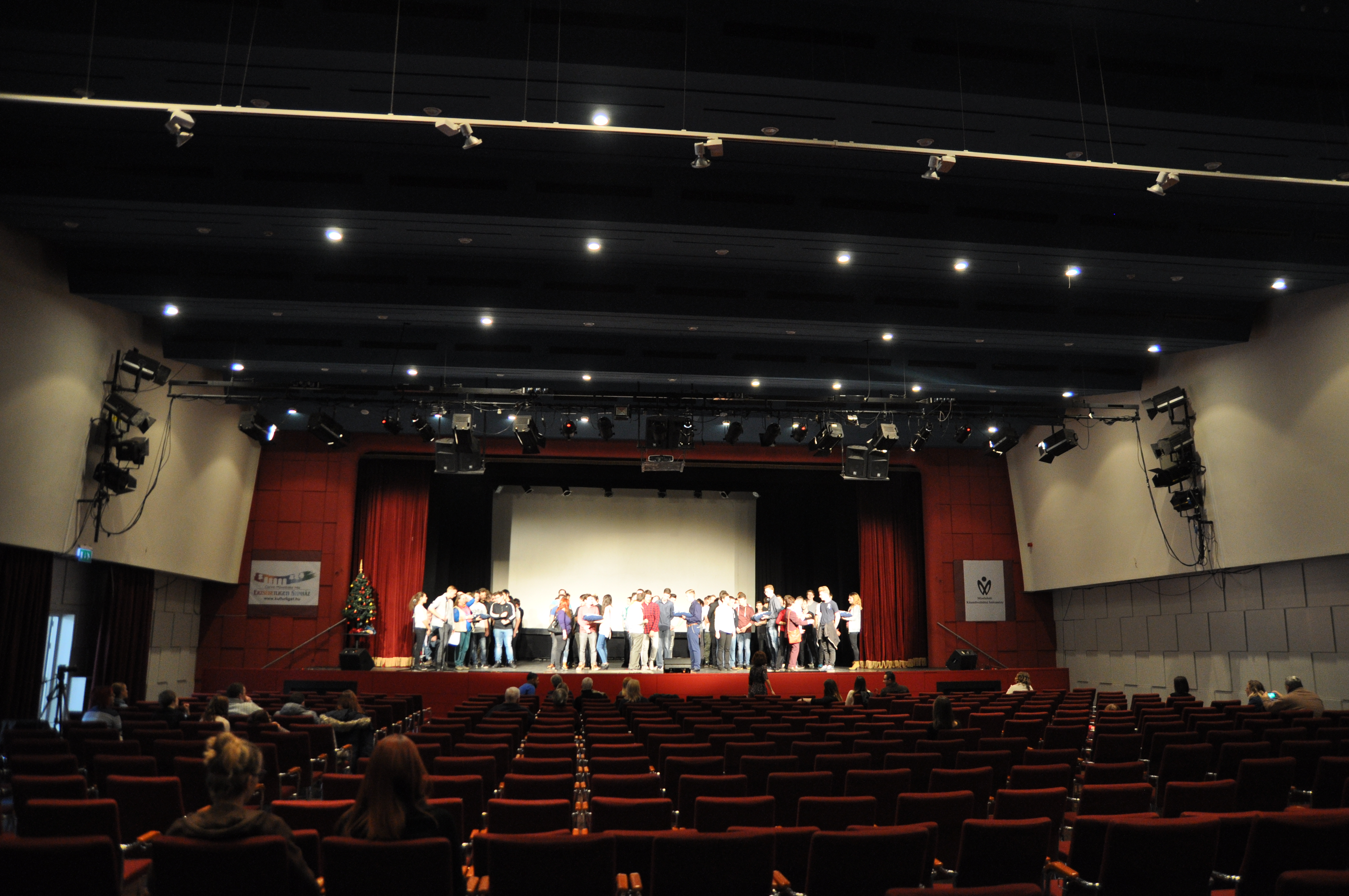
