= Sugar for the Soul =

Studio album by Sexepil
- Released: 12 February 1995 (Hungary)
- Recorded: 1994
- Genre: Indie rock
- Length: 47:16
- Label: Warner Bros. Records
- Producer: Brian Anderson

Sexepil chronology
Against Nature (1993)	Sugar for the Soul (1995)	Your Scream Is Music (2014)

Singles from Sugar for the Soul
- 1. "Jerusalem" Released: 1 December 1994

Professional ratings
Review scores
Source	Rating
Metal Hammer	(6/7)

Sugar for the Soul is the fifth studio album recorded by Sexepil. The album was recorded by Brian Anderson at the Phoenix Studio in Budapest, Hungary. The album was produced by Brian Anderson and Sexepil, and it was mixed Brian Anderson and engineered by Mark Haines at Butch Vig and Steve Marker's Smart Studios in Madison, Wisconsin, The United States. The record was mastered by Howie Weinberg at Masterdisk in New York City, The United States. All songs were written by Sexepil and all lyrics by Mick Ness. The album was released by Magneoton and Warner Music Hungary, Warner Music Group in Hungary.

== Track listing ==
All tracks are written by Sexepil

No.	Title	Length
1.	"Point Black"	5:23
2.	"Jerusalem"	4:26
3.	"I Come"	4:59
4.	"Buffalo Thunder"	7:43
5.	"Those Days are Gone"	5:46
6.	"Snowbird"	3:47
7.	"Jaws of the Underground"	5:47
8.	"Bittersweet"	5:54
9.	"I Love You Like No Other"	4:11
10.	"2000"	5:45
11.	"Take Us Home Again"	3:29
12.	"The India Song"	5:03
Total length:		47:16

== Personnel ==
The following people contributed to Sugar for the Soul:

Sexepil

- László Viktor - bass
- Tibor Vangel - drums
- Tamás Kocsis - guitars
- Mick Ness - vocals
- Gábor Varga - keyboards

Additional musicians and production

- Brian Anderson - recording and mixing
- Béla Jánosi - engineering
- Howie Weinberg - mastering
- Miklós Déri - cover photo
