= Feró Nagy =

Hungarian singer

Ferenc "Feró" Nagy (born 14 January 1946 in Letenye, Hungary) is a Hungarian rock singer and musician. Although not proficient on any instrument, he can play the guitar, the harmonica, the saxophone and the piano.

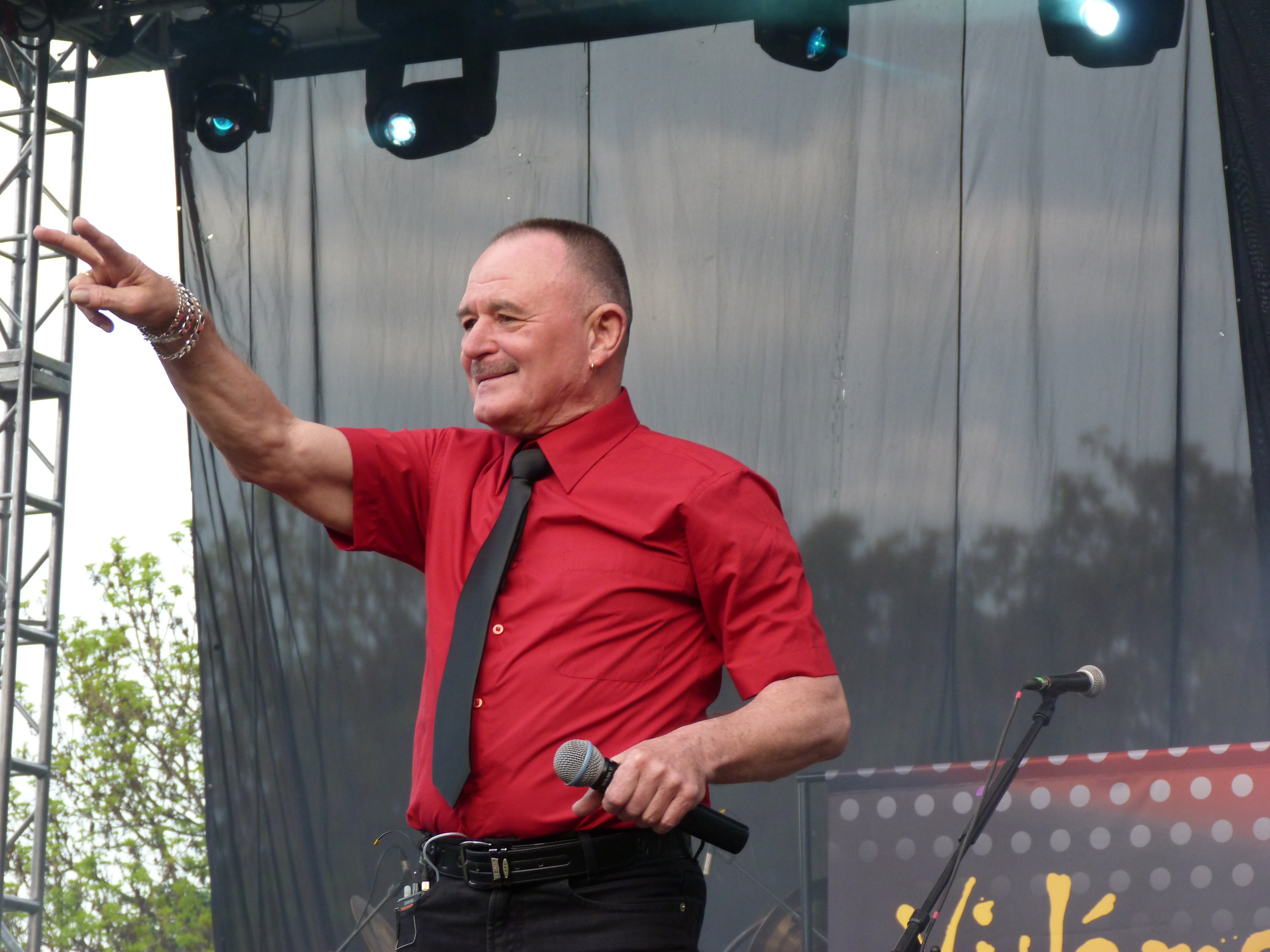
Feró Nagy at Tabán

== Career ==
Feró studied at the Polytechnic and earned a degree in engineering. He began singing in rock bands as a hobby in the 1960s. He became famous as the singer, frontman and songwriter of the band Beatrice in the late 1970s. He created a "phenomenon" with his stage style, doing long comical and/or aggressive monologues and performances calling himself "A Nemzet csótánya" (translated as roach of the nation") and being an outspoken anti-Socialist.

After leaving Beatrice, he formed another band called Bikini in 1982, then returned to Beatrice in 1987 to date. He tours with the band and releases materials with the group, although he has also released solo albums and an anthology.

Feró worked as an actor in a number of films and theatrical plays. On stage he played a part in the rock opera István a király and took part in the rock version of "Hamlet". He also played the part of Berger in the musical Hair. Among his movie roles are Céllövölde (1989) in which he starred as a detective, Argo (2004) in which he played role of Pro and Pappa Pia (2017). Feró was also the Hungarian voice of Andrew Dice Clay in The Adventures of Ford Fairlane.

He participated in Hungarian politics and was a member of the right-wing Hungarian Justice and Life Party from the early 1990s to 1999. He was a showman in Rádió Pannon for months, but, because of personal and conceptional conflicts, left the radio. When the party, as retaliation, disavowed him and revoked his status as a campaigner, he left the party.

After his political acts, he declared himself to be independent, and continued his singer-songwriter-frontsman carrier in Beatrice. He also regularly appears in "yellow press" media, and similar TV shows (like X-Faktor), with which he draw criticism on himself ("a one-time rebel who became for money what he criticised in the old days"), the most angry of these critics being from the far-right kuruc.info.

In 2006 he created the Rock Klub at the Erzsébetliget Theatre in Budapest. He invited bands such as Purple Haze and Dawnstar. He also interviewed the band members before the concert along with Barbara Remiczki.

On 26 October 2020, it was announced that he was infected with COVID-19.

On 15 March 2021, he received The Kossuth Prize (Hungarian: Kossuth-díj) to acknowledge outstanding personal and group achievements in the fields of culture and the arts.
