= Your Scream Is Music =

Studio album by Sexepil
- Released: 17 November 2014 (Worldwide)
- Recorded: 2008–2014
- Genre: Indie rock
- Length: 51:41
- Producer: Dávid Schram, Sexepil

Sexepil chronology
| Sugar for the Soul (1995) | Your Scream Is Music (2014) |

Singles from Your Scream Is Music
- 1. "Rat King" Released: 11 November 2014

Professional ratings
Review scores
| Source | Rating |
|---|---|
| Heti Világgazdaság | None |
| HangZorro | None |
| Now Magazin | None |

Your Scream Is Music is the sixth studio album recorded by Sexepil. The album was recorded by Dávid Schram at Pannonia Studio in Budapest, Hungary and by Tibor Vangel at Mom!TheMeatloaf! Studios in Cardiff and mastered by Gavin Lurssen in Los Angeles, The United States.

== Track listing ==
All lyrics are written by Tibor Vangel

| No. | Title | Music | Producer(s) | Length |
|---|---|---|---|---|
| 1. | "Rat King" | Sexepil | Dávid Schram & Sexepil | 4:56 |
| 2. | "Decipher" | Sexepil | Dávid Schram & Sexepil | 5:37 |
| 3. | "It's Fun" | Sexepil | Dávid Schram & Sexepil | 4:24 |
| 4. | "Clinger" | Tibor Vangel | Dávid Schram & Sexepil | 3:26 |
| 5. | "Dormant" | Sexepil | Dávid Schram & Sexepil | 6:05 |
| 6. | "The Great Excuse" | Sexepil | Dávid Schram & Sexepil | 4:47 |
| 7. | "Go Away" | Sexepil | Dávid Schram & Sexepil | 6:06 |
| 8. | "Eye of the Lens" | Comsat Angels | Dávid Schram & Sexepil | 4:12 |
| 9. | "Hiroshima Mon Amour" | Sexepil | Dávid Schram & Sexepil | 4:44 |
| 10. | "Your Little Revolution" | Sexepil | Dávid Schram & Sexepil | 7:13 |

== Personnel ==
Sexepil

- László Viktor - bass
- Tibor Vangel - drums, vocals, guitars, bass, programming
- Tamás Kocsis - guitars
- Endre Deák - guitars

The following people contributed to Your Scream Is Music

- Gabor Kapusi - art design
- Dávid Schram - co-producing, recording and mixing
- Gavin Lurssen - mastering
