= Beatrice (band) =

Hungarian rock band

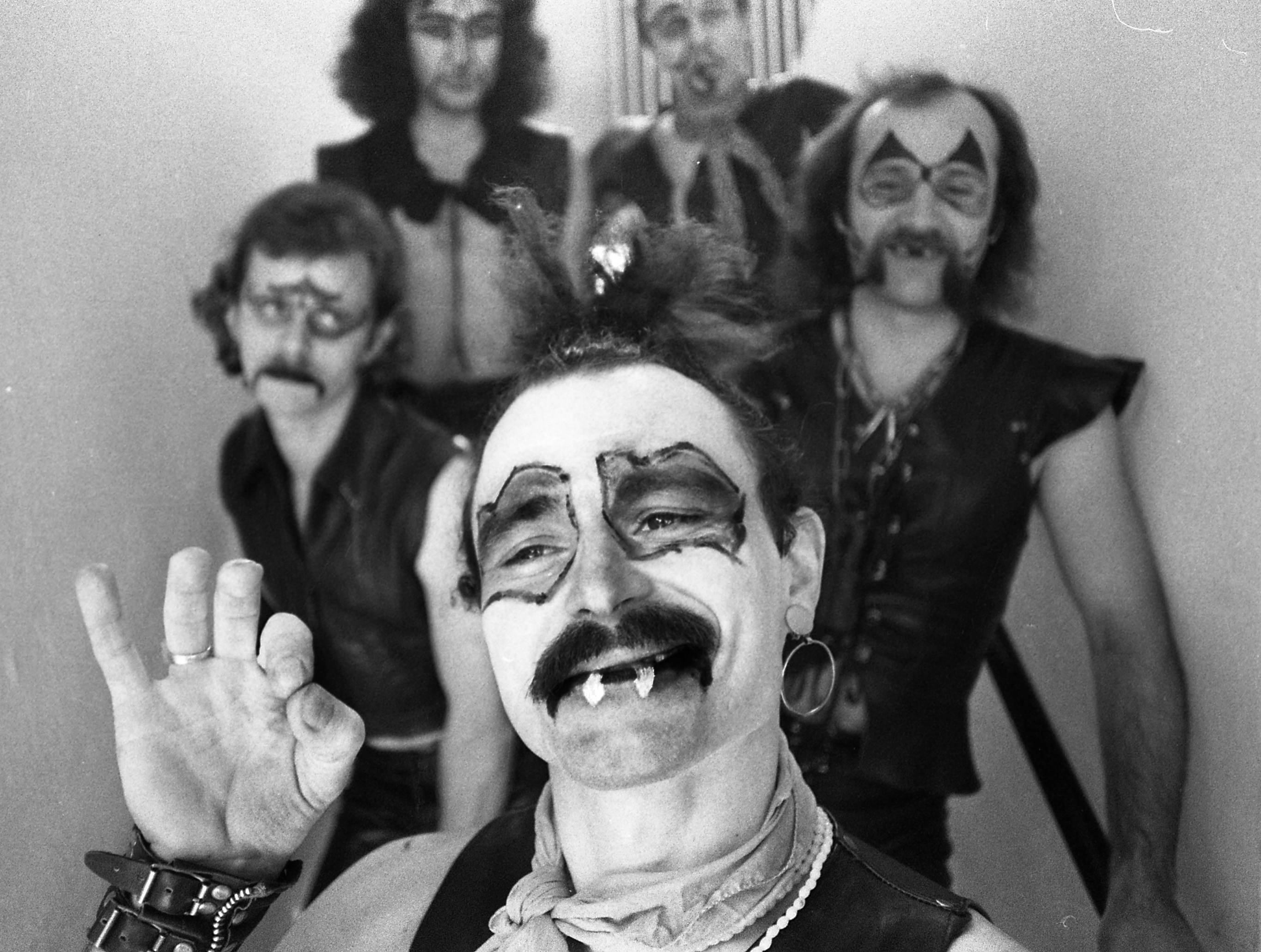
- The ensemble in a 1978 photograph (Tibor Donászy, Lajos Miklóska up the back, László Lugosi, Attila Gidófalvy in the middle, Feró Nagy up the front); Recording by Tamás Urbán

Background information
- Origin: Budapest, Hungary
- Genres: Punk rock; hard rock; alternative rock; heavy metal
- Years active: 1969–1977, 1978–1981, 1987–present
- Labels: MHV; Ring; Hungaroton; Quint/EMI
- Members: Feró Nagy; Norbert Móritz; Levente Kálmánchelyi; Dávid Kispál; Richárd Szpuszenik
- Past members: see here
- Website: www.beatrice.hu

Beatrice (or simply Ricse, sometimes referred to as Nagy Feró és a Beatrice or Nagyferó és a Beatrice) is a Hungarian rock band. It was founded in 1969 as a women's band, and mostly played cover songs. In 1971, Feró Nagy joined the band as a frontman. In the following years, the members were gradually replaced, and from 1974 they began to write their own songs in the then popular glam rock style. In order to get a record deal, the band became oriented towards disco music from 1976.

The group disbanded in 1977, and in the following year, Beatrice was reunited as a rock band by Nagy Feró with bassist Lajos Miklóska, guitarist László Lugosi, keyboardist Attila Gidófalvy, and drummer Tibor Donászy, and started playing rock in a similar style to that of AC/DC. At this time they wrote songs that are typically about topics like the hopelessness of everyday life, such as Jericho, the Metropolitan Wolf, and Angel Land. The party-state culture policy consistently hampered the "unmanageable" band, which eventually disbanded in 1981.

Beatrice, after its reunion in 1987, became a success in an atmosphere of regime change. In 1988, they self-published their first album. Their second album, Utálom az egész XX. századot, was featured on the Mahasz disk sales top list for 40 weeks, at some point reaching first place. Beatrice's biggest hit to date is 8 óra munka. During this period, their concerts would all sell out. By 1994, the band was practically depleted: besides Feró Nagy, only guitarist Brúger László remained in the band. For this reason, Feró Nagy reorganized the orchestra, which was from 1994 officially called New Beatrice, and had a constantly changing lineup. The "new" attribute was later abandoned, however, and in recent years their concerts have often been advertised as "Nagy Feró és a Beatrice". Released in 2010, the concert video of the band's 30th anniversary was ranked 1st in the Mahasz DVD list.

== History ==
=== The early Beatrice (1969–1977) ===
Beatrice was founded in 1969 as a women's band, with members Mónika Csuka (vocals, guitar), Kati Nagy (keyboards), Krisztina Hamar (bass guitar) and Mária Csuka (drums). At a point, Judith Szűcs played the organ as a member of the band. They played mostly cover songs, but sometimes performed original songs such as Jóbarátom, written by Mária Csuka and László Komár, for release as single.

In 1970, the band found a permanent home at the Telephone Factory in Kőbánya. They didn't play their own songs, they had a repertoire mostly consisting of covers: Hendrix - Fire, Shocking Blue - Venus, Middle Of The Road - Chirpy Chirpy Chip-Chip, The Equals - Michael And The Slipper Tree, I'm a man (Joe Cocker version). In 1971 Feró Nagy married Mónika Csuka and joined the band as a singer at the end of the year. As a result of the continuous changes in the lineup, the women of the band were gradually replaced. Kati Nagy went on to be in Tűzkerék and Mária Csuka became a member of the Vadmacskák. In 1972 Sándor Bencsik joined the band as a guitarist, he was later followed by András Temesvári (bassist), Péter Temesvári (drummer), Károly Nagy (keyboardist). After Bencsik's departure Zoltán Gáti became the guitarist.

In the aftermath of Károly Nagy's leaving, the band continued their concerts without a keyboardist. They did not write any songs during this period, instead they played other performers' songs, such as Sweet, Mud, Gary Glitter, Suzi Quatro and other, mostly glam rock songs. Nagy Feró's unique style and their humorous, improvised design elements, which were considered a novelty in Hungary at the time, created a distinctive atmosphere at their events.

After several months of reorganisation, the new and improved Beatrice was introduced in the summer of 1974 at the Kőbánya Youth Club. Sándor Cziránku became the band's guitarist, Barile Pasqualé replaced Péter Temesvári at the drums, and after the departure of András Temesvári, Mónika Csuka played the bass in addition to her role as a vocalist. After this, they played mainly their own songs, their first demo recordings were made, the song titled "One Word" sung by Csuka Mónika was also broadcast by the Hungarian Radio, but they had no records released. Beatrice's concert at the FMH on October 10, 1976, was recorded by the Hungarian Radio.

In 1977, Beatrice shifted towards disco music in an effort to become better known. They were featured in the radio program Tessék választani! (Make your choice!) with their song Gyere, kislány, gyere ("Come, Little Girl, Come"), which was released on the show's compilation album. At the time the band's guitarist was Zoltán Marschalkó. Mónika Csuka became a member of the Mikrolied female vocal trio in 1976, which later fused with Beatrice. They had plans for a joint record, but the idea went unrealised and the band disbanded.

=== The "black sheep" Beatrice (1978–1981) ===
In 1978, Beatrice was reorganized and another style change took place. Through Tibor Miklós, a writer, Feró Nagy became acquainted with the music of AC/DC and wanted to take Beatrice in this blues-based rock direction. The initial lineup consisted of Feró Nagy, Attila Gidófalvy (keyboardist), László Lugosi (guitarist) Miklóska Lajos (bassist) and Tibor Donászy (drummer). At first they mostly performed Deep Purple, AC/DC and Ramones covers in the Budapest Youth Park, which were shortly complemented by their own songs: Jericho, Motorized Generation, Faded Star, Standing on the Ground, Goodbye, Metropolitan Wolf, No Need. In 1978, Beatrice was the fourth favourite band of the Ifipark audience, behind P. Mobil, Piramis and Mini.

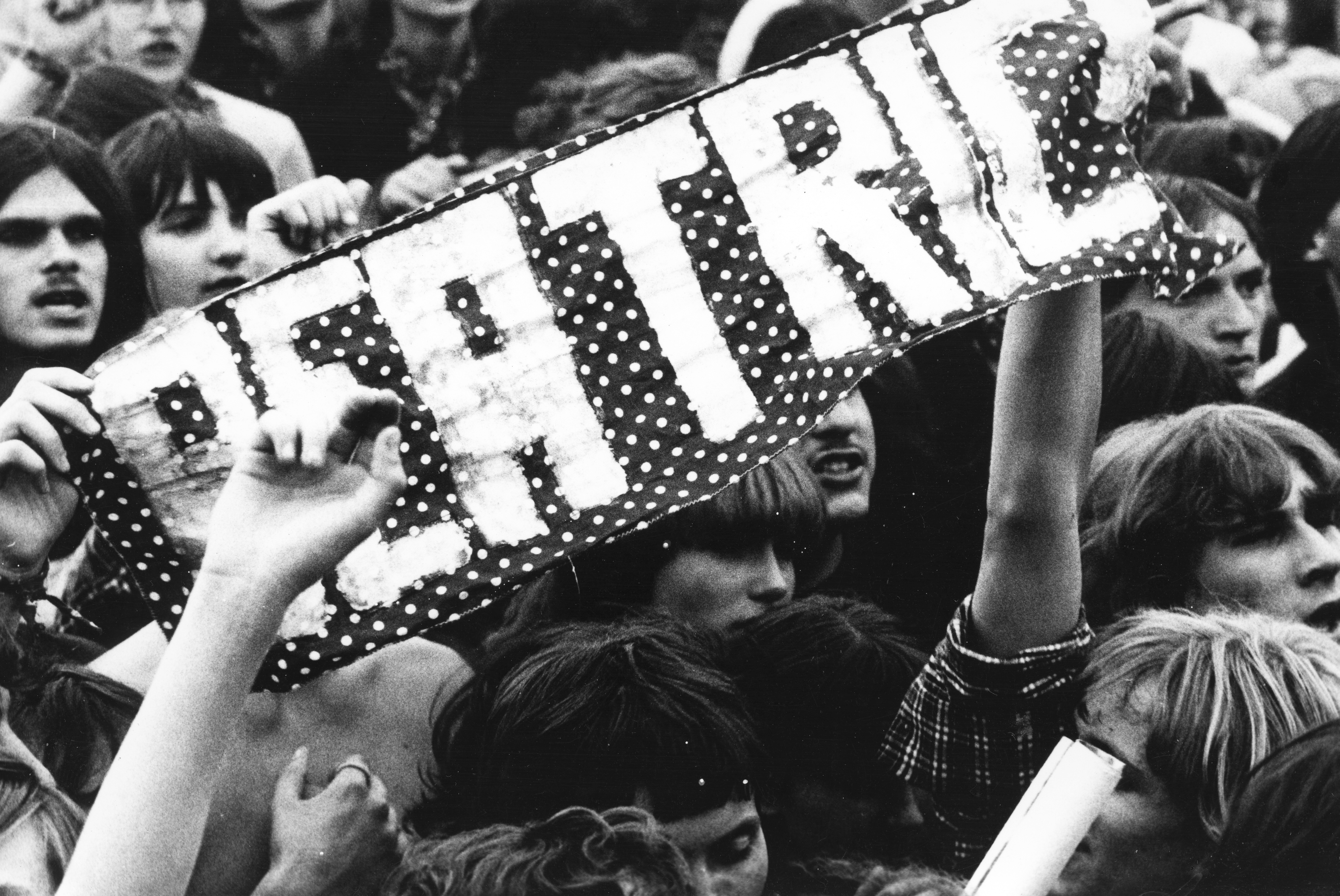
Beatrice fans in 1979

When news of the punk music scandal broke in Hungary in the late 1970s, the cultural press labeled Beatrice as punks, even though the musicians themselves have never even heard of the style before. The band was banned from the then-vital Youth Park after a girl from the audience somehow got on stage and started masturbating with a femur bone. This was accompanied by other shocking rumours, and as a result, Beatrice was banned from most of the capital's clubs as well. According to the most famous rumour, the members of the band ground a live chicken at one of their concerts. Despite the rumours falseness Péter Erdős, the Hungarian "popcaesar", announced it in his TV show as a fact. The band then deliberately undertook to represent the "bottom ten thousand". Thanks to state media, their disreputable nature became well-known, soon they were banned from several counties and state security agencies were constantly harassing the members of the band. Despite, or maybe because of this, their fame grew rapidly across the country. Their black leather pants, the leather vest, torn jeans, and distinctive red-white dotted (“babos”) scarf distinguished them and their audience from other bands.

In April 1979, Gidófalvy left the band for the newly formed Carthage, and Beatrice continued with a four-man lineup. The same year they were given an opportunity to record a full album in Radio 6's studio. László B. Révész requested the use of Beatrice's song for a film he directed about at-risk youth. The record was only released in 1993, after the regime change (Megkerült hangszalag: Betiltott dalok, 1979). Even though they did not have an album released, recordings of Beatrice songs were occasionally made. In 1980 the band performed Minek él az olyan, a song by Szabolcs Fényes and Iván Szenes, on the radio. In the movie about boxer László Papp, Pofonok völgye, Beatrice performed Mire megy itt a játék, a song written by János Bródy, which was also released as a single. They won a KISZ competition with their original song Nem nekem tanulsz. In July, they toured as the opening act of Omega and LGT, and were featured in the album Kisstadion ’80. On August 23, 1980, the brand manager of the Hungarian Record Record Company, Péter Erdős announced on the Hajógyári Island in Óbuda to an audience of over 25 thousand youngsters three "rebellious" orchestras called "Black Lambs": Beatrice, P. Mobil and Hobo Blues Band, with AE Bizottság being their opening act. (The three bands repeated the show three days later in Körmend). At the end of 1980, guitarist Lugosi left to join Dinamit, who were preparing for their second album. He was replaced by Csaba Bogdán, then the lineup was completed with József Vedres (guitarist) and Laszlo Waszlavik (keyboardist) - a documentation of this period is the double CD Betiltott dalok II./1981 (Tudományos Rockizmus), released in 2013, which contained 150 minutes of previously unreleased recordings.

In March 1981, under pressure from the authorities, the Musician Trade Union distanced itself from the orchestra, so Beatrice was not invited to the trade union super concert on August 22, where all the popular Hungarian rock performers performed. Four days later Feró Nagy announced the dissolution of the band. Their last concert was on July 30 in the Nyíregyháza Youth Park. Feró and Vedres founded the band Bikini in 1982 together with drummer Gabor Antal, guitarist Szucs Gabor Nemeth and bass guitarist Alajos Németh.

=== The popular Beatrice (1987–1993) ===
There have been signs of Beatrice's 1987 re-establishment even before it occurred. They performed as a surprise on 22 September 1984, in the Youth Park, after Bikini, with the lineup being: Feró Nagy (vocals), Miklóska (rhythm guitar), Lugosi (guitar), Donászy (drums), Waszlavik (keyboards), András Trunkos (bass). In 1985, Feró's talented six-year-old son also joined the band as a drummer. In 1986 they gave several concerts in the FMH with the addition of Tamás Zsoldos as their bass guitarist. From the beginning of 1987, László Kreutz took the place of drummer at concerts after Donaszy left for Edda Művek. On May 2, 1987, at their concert in Petőfi Hall, it was announced that Beatrice was officially re-established (with their lineup being Feró Nagy, Miklóska, Lugosi, Waszlavik, Zsoldos, Kreutz, but Waszlavik soon left).

In 1988, after the end of the state monopoly on record release, the band signed a contract with the private record label Ring. Their first album to be released was a double album with the title Beatrice '78 –'88. The first part mostly consisted of the classic, old Ricse songs, while the second was made up of their newer compositions, like the instant hit Azok a boldog szép napok, or the more serious A kétezredik év felé. At the time of the album's recording the band's drummer was Bertalan Hirlemann.

In the bustle of the 1989 regime change, Beatrice quickly became a popular band. Their rebellious opposition in the past ten years finally bore fruit. Miklóska was not able to withstand the rush and left, while the rhythm section was renewed with the arrival of László Zselencz bassist and drummer Zoltán Pálmai. In 1990, the state-owned record label Hungaroton released the album Gyermekkorunk lexebb dalai, composed mostly of old Beatrice songs, from which the Amuri partizánok dalab, a song composed of several communist tunes, became a huge hit. László Brúger joined in the place of Miklóska as a rhythmist.

Seeing their success, Jenő Bors, the MHV's former head, who refused to release Beatrice's album ten years earlier, now, as the director of the newly founded Quint publisher, decided to sign a contract with the band, who reached the peak of their careers with their 1991 album titled Utálom az egész XX. századot. Beatrice triumphed with punk rock reworks of their older songs such as 8 óra munka, Hegyek között, and Pancsoló kislány. This album was Mahasz's bestsellers list for 40 weeks straight, even reaching first place. The I. Kelet-európai Rockfesztivál was organized on Hajógyári Island in June 1991. Ten years after they were banned from the trade union super-concert, they were one of the main orchestras of the three-day festival. On November 23, they had a full house concert at Budapest Sportcsarnok. The success story came to an end in 1992 with the release of the concert recording A Beatrice legjobb dalai, which reached the 3rd place on the Mahasz list. Soon László Lugosi left the band, and was quickly followed by Pálmai.

The album Vidám magyarok, made by the Nagy Feró-Brúger-Zselenc trio, also reached third place on the Mahasz list. Lugosi left the band in 1993, his place was filed by Joe Vedres, who was previously part of the band before 1981, and Gábor Németh, who was a founder of Bikini in 1981. However, by 1994, the band ran out of members again after Vedres, Németh and Zselencz left.

=== New Beatrice (1994–2009) ===
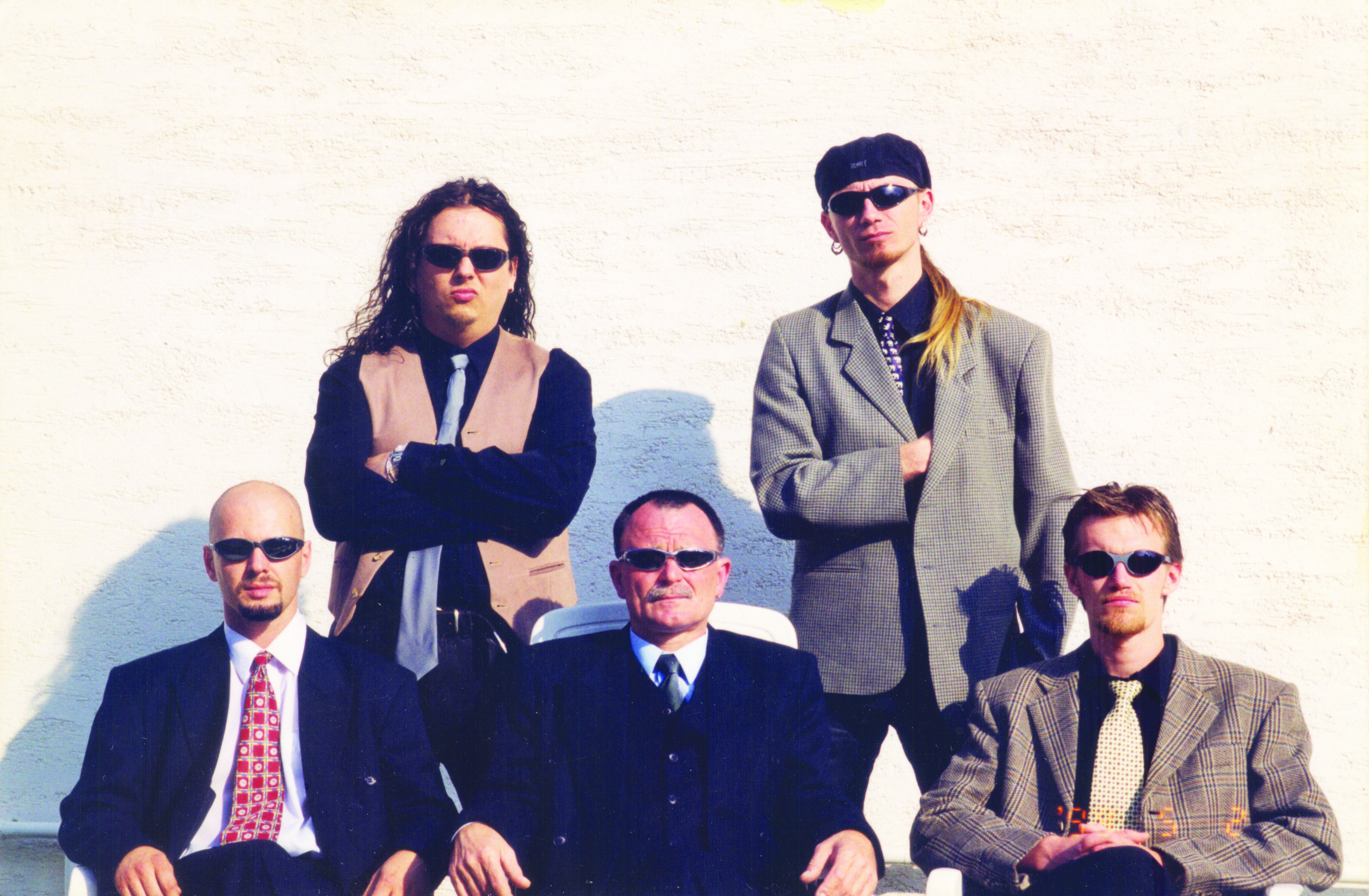
1999 formation: from the front: Károly Székely, Feró Nagy, István Fülöp, back: Ferenc Laczik, Zsolt Péter

In the middle of the nineties, the entire band was replaced by Feró Nagy. The old veteran musicians were replaced by young rockers, only Feró Nagy remained among the old ones and Laszlo László Waszlavik was re-discovered. Attila Heffner, bassist, gave his place to Ferenc Laczik from the Action Unit after a few months. In 1995, László Brúger followed him, with two new guitarists: Zsolt Péter and Károly Székely (ex-Phobia). At the same time, Waszlavik got out and the New Beatrice (under that name) was officially born. New Beatrice produced a four-digit demo in 1996, which was expanded to 13 songs in November with a CD titled 'Take It...' in Hungaroton's release. At the time of the release, drummer Zoltán Nagy left the band and was replaced by István Fülöp (ex-Phobia).

In 1998, a two-hour concert video was released on VHS Hungarian, which was recorded in the E-Club on 27 February. At that time the band played in the beer garden of the Petőfi Hall. In the same year on 4 September, a 20-year jubilee concert was held at the Petofi Hall, where the three epochs of Beatrice (the classical Ricse of the 1980s, the '89 -92 success, and the current '98) were held. also appeared. The concert was released on a double CD by Premier Art. In July 1999, the next Beatrice studio album "Premaroma" was released at Premier Art. The title song is the bumpy, punk version of the hit Macarena. During the year, EMI-Quint re-released their older Beatrice albums on CD (I hate the whole 20th century, Beatrice's best songs, Cheerful Hungarians, Banned songs).

Since the change of regime, Feró Nagy and Beatrice have appeared on several political sides (Fidesz, MDF). At the turn of the millennium, they participated regularly in the events of the National Rock Ensemble at the events of the MIÉP and the Sixty-Four County Youth Movement (for example, the National Song Festival, Hungarian Island). Since 2000, Feró Nagy has become the editor-in-chief of the radical Pannon Radio.

After six years, the new Beatrice's stable standing had broken down. In 2002, István Fülöp drummer left Bertalan Hirlemann. Hirlemann was a member of the ensemble in 1988, and he also drummed on the European Show Illusion, which was released under the name of Feró Nagy in 2002 (also beside the guitarist Ferenc Laczik, bassist and Zsolt Péter). In 2003, guitarists, Peter and Székely, left the band, so Joe Vedres and a young guitarist, Viktor Magasvári joined. This lineup remained until 2010. On October 18, 2008, Beatrice celebrated its 30th anniversary in the Petőfi Hall. The concert video released from the event reached No. 1 on the MAHASZ DVD chart.

=== Today (2010–present) ===
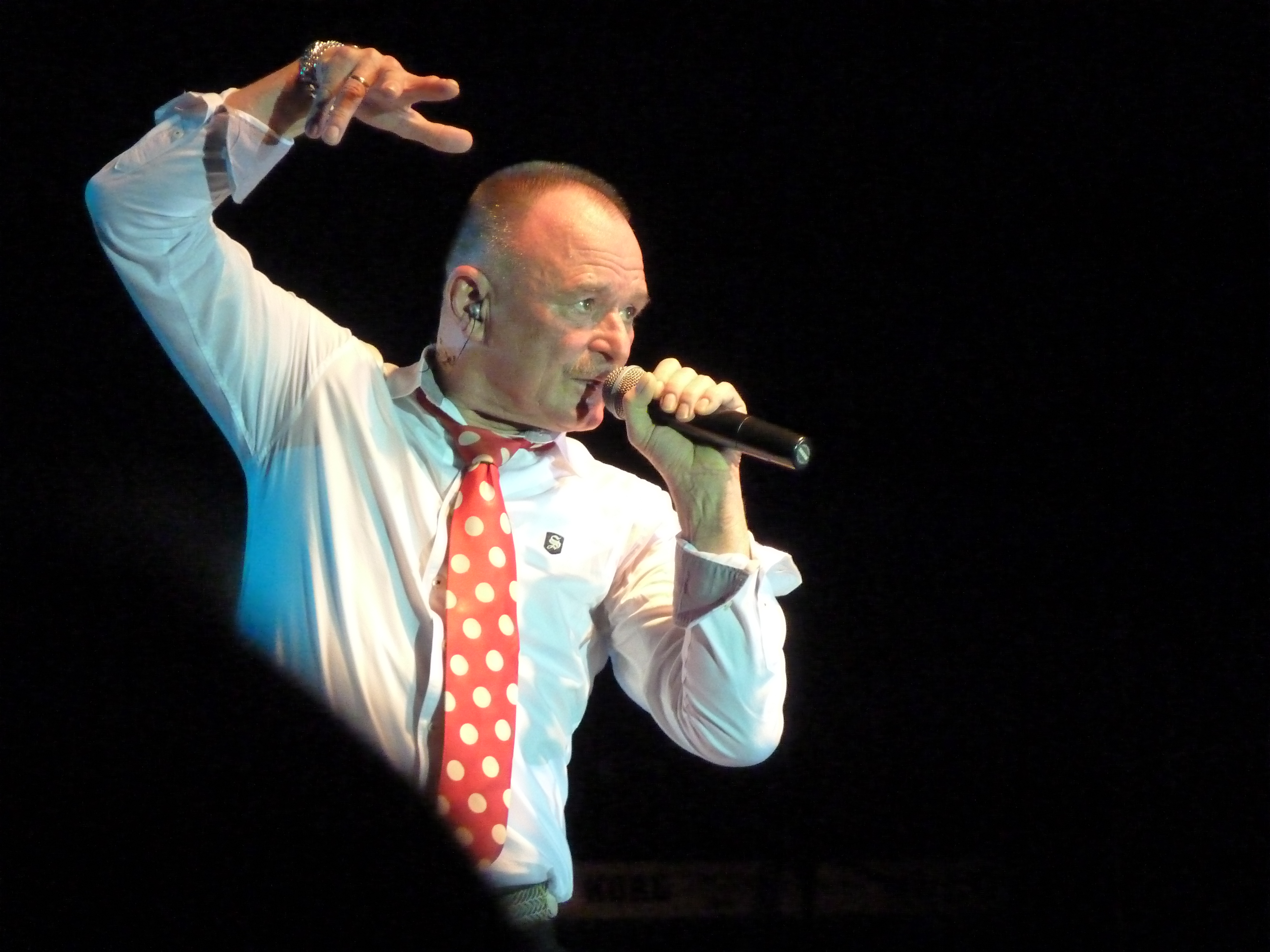
Beatrice 35

In early 2010, Feró Nagy announced the reorganization of the band: Vedres Joe and Hirleman Bertalan left; the latter was replaced by the son of Feró Nagy, Attila Nagy, who was a regular guest. The rejuvenated Beatrice began to create a new studio album, two of which were already featured on the show. On July 31, 2010, the MTV Icon program featured contemporary bands and performers reinterpreting Beatrice's songs, paying tribute to the band's work. The recordings of the new album started in March 2011, and two months later, the album "Joy and Rock & Roll" was released.

At the end of 2011, the double Beatrice album was released on CD on the CD by Collective Art. The band celebrated its 35th birthday on 16 March 2013, at the Petőfi Hall. Since the 1970s, the ensemble has performed at one of the most prominent places in Hungarian pop music life, Tabán. At the Tabán Festival on 1 May 2015, Tamás Takáts, Ádám Török and New Mini, Mobilmánia and Edda stepped on stage alongside Beatrice.

On 6 October 2015, László Lugosi, guitarist of the classical lineup, died as a result of larynx.

In August 2016, a new guitarist joined Botor Tari, who has been working with the team since 2013 as a technician. At the beginning of 2018 Viktor Magasvári was replaced by Zalán Kékkői, but according to the orchestra's statement, Viktors Magasvári is considered an "heirloom" member of Beatrice, who can enter any concert in the future.

On 7 April 2018, the band celebrated its 40th anniversary with a grand concert at the Arena. In the blocks of the program, different ages of the oeuvre of Beatrice and Feró Nagy were recalled. The concert was opened by a speech by Lajos Miklóska, and later several guests appeared: from the old Beatrice Attila Gidófalvy and Tibor Donászy, the former guitarist Viktor Viktoras Magasvári, András Pásztor, András Wahorn, Mihály Mező, Miklós Varga, József Kalapács. The orchestra was complemented by a wind section and female vocalist in some songs.

== Awards and honours ==
- Transilvanian Music Awards – Különdíj (2013)

== The side branches of Beatrice ==
=== (Ancestor-)Bikini ===
After the dissolution of Beatrice in 1981, Feró Nagy and József Vedres, with the three remaining members of Dynamite, founded the Bikini in 1982. The drummer was Gábor Németh, who later became a member of Beatrice for a short time. They played punk-rock-like music with new waves, Beatrice songs on their concerts. After two albums, Feró Nagy got out, his successor became Louis D. Nagy. In the ensemble's music, the change resulted in a remarkable renewal, and the Feró period was later awarded the Ancient Bikini flag.

In 1999, the Ancient Bikini set up for a concert, and since then has been on a casual basis. Alajos Németh (the only founding member to play in the Bikini to date) rarely participates in these concerts, mostly by Facó Laczik. Beatrice concerts also occasionally play some Ancient Bikini songs.

Feró Nagy participated in the work of D. Nagy's Bikini as a writer. His compositions include Before I Go, which is currently on Beatrice concerts, and is also on the new album.

=== The combination of Kuroshio ===
At the end of 1988, Lajos Miklóska (singer and bassist) joined László Brúger, who had previously played guitar with Beatrice for a time. Because of health problems affecting Beatrice's drummer, the group became part of Beatrice's lineup. The band remained active for a year or two and performed a handful of concerts, some of which survive onined on bootleg recordings.

== Band members ==
Current lineup

- Feró Nagy – vocals (1971–1981, 1987–present)
- Norbert Móritz – bass guitar (2024–present)
- Endre Csillag – guitar (2024–present)
- Richárd Szpuszenik – drums, percussion (2024–present)

Classic lineup (1978–1980)

- Feró Nagy – vocals
- László Lugosi – guitar
- Lajos Miklóska – bass guitar
- Tibor Donászy – drums, percussion
- Attila Gidófalvy – keyboard (until 1979)

Most successful lineup (1989–1992)

- Feró Nagy – vocals
- László Lugosi – guitar
- László Zselencz – bass guitar
- Zoltán Pálmai – drums, percussion
- László Brúger – guitar (1991–present)

== Discography ==
Studio albums

- Beatrice '78–'88 (1988) – double album
- Gyermekkorunk lexebb dalai (1990)
- Utálom az egész XX. századot (1991)
- Vidám magyarok (1992)
- Betiltott dalok ("Megkerült hangszalag") (1993)
- Ki viszi át… (1996)
- Vakaroma (1999)
- Vidámság és rock & roll (2011)
- Beatrice '77-'88 (CD reissue, 2011)

Concert videos

- Kisstadion '80 (1980) – Beatrice–LGT–Omega joint album
- A Beatrice legjobb dalai (1992)
- 20 éves jubileumi koncert (1998)
- Betiltott dalok II./1981 - Tudományos Rockizmus (2013) – double CD, compiled in 1981, unofficial recordings;
- Az első 40 év Live! (2018)

Other recordings

- Jóbarátom (1970) – half single
- Tessék választani '77 (1977) – compilation album, with Gyere kislány, gyere
- Mire megy itt a játék (1980) – half single
- Hamlet (1986) – She plays Beatrice on the Nagy Feró's solo album

Videos

- Magyar vagyok (VHS, 1998)
- 30 éves jubileumi koncert (DVD, 2008)

Contributions

- A nemzeti dal ünnepe (national compilation – 2002)
- 100% blues (blues compilation – 2003)
- A Rockalbum – A magyar rock 16 nagy pillanata (rock compilation – 2004)
- Feketebárányok koncert – 1980 (Concert recording – 2004)
- Bocskai Szabadegyetem színpada (CD of Trianon Memorial Program)
