= Mora (album) =

MORA

Studio album by FreshFabrik
- Released: 10 June 2011 (Hungary)
- Recorded: 2010–11
- Genre: Nu metal, industrial metal, alternative metal
- Length: 40:05
- Label: Alexandra, Hungary
- Producer: FreshFabrik

FreshFabrik chronology
Finest (2006)	MORA (2011)

Professional ratings
Review scores
Source	Rating
Lángoló Gitárok	(9/10)

MORA is the fifth studio album of Hungarian industrial nu metal band FreshFabrik. The album was released under the label of Hungarian record and book company Alexandra . Four videos were shot supporting MORA: "Stealing The Sun", "Woman", "Into The Light" and "Orpheus". MORA was honoured as the Best Domestic Modern Pop-Rock Album of 2011 at the 2012 Fonogram, Hungarian Music Awards.

== Track listing ==
1. Ghosts
2. Fire
3. Stealing the Sun
4. Orpheus
5. Soul Emergency
6. Tramontana
7. Into The Light
8. Wonderland
9. Europa
10. Woman
11. Stealing the Sun (karaoke)

== Personnel ==
The following people contributed to MORA:

FreshFabrik

- Szabolcs Oláh - vocals & guitar
- Levente Kovács - bass
- András Szabó - drums
- László Szvoboda - guitars, vocals

Additional musicians and production

- Dávid Schram - mixing & mastering
