= Attwenger =

Austrian musical duo

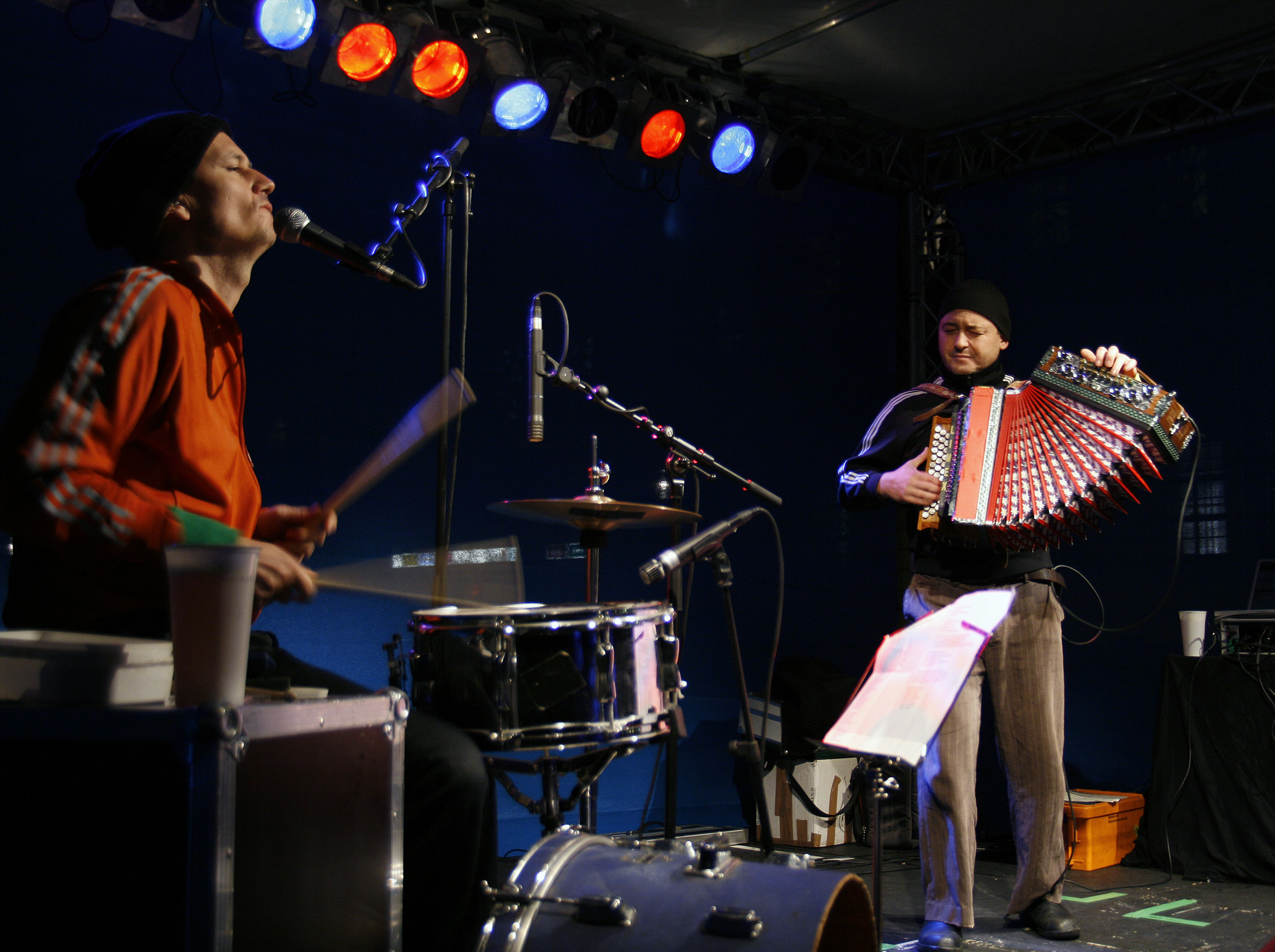
Attwenger performing live in 2008.

Attwenger (formed 1990) is a musical duo from Linz, Austria. The group is made up of drummer Markus Binder and button accordion player Hans-Peter Falkner; both members also sing.

Attwenger's music is an unusual combination of Upper Austrian folk music and hip-hop, with lyrics sung (and rapped) in Upper Austrian dialect. Falkner often plays his accordion through effects pedals to give his instrument a distorted timbre similar to that of an electric guitar. Binder sometimes uses drum machines.

The band has released nine studio albums, with drum being the most recent in 2021, and more recently Binder composed the soundtrack for the movie Club Zero by Jessica Hauser, which won the Best Soundtrack Award at the European Film Awards 2023.

The duo has toured Europe, Zimbabwe (1993), Siberia, Pakistan, Vietnam, and Malaysia (1995). In 2003 they won an Amadeus Austrian Music Award, in the category "FM4 Alternative Act des Jahres" (alternative act of the year). Of the group, the noted BBC DJ John Peel (1939-2004) said, "I have no idea what it's all about, but I like the general noise a great deal."

Attwenger worked together with Fred Frith, the Boban Marković Orkestar, and Austrian hip hop group Texta.

== Lyrics ==
The lyrics contain several word plays, most of them are impossible or hard to translate or explain to Non-Austrians (some even to Non-Upper Austrians) Some of the word plays are English related, especially in the album titles:

song is, aside from its English meaning the Austrian dialect word for to say. sun (spoken: soon) is Austrian dialect for Sonne, which in English again, means sun.

dog in Austrian dialect means day, and the German word for dog is Hund. The song on the album contains the line da dog der is a hund - the day is a dog. This has no meaning in English, but in Austria the saying that "something is a Hund" relates to something being difficult, or not working out as expected.

An example for a word play that can be translated into English, also characterizing the general message transmitted by Attwenger, can be found on dog: "A jeder mensch zöd, a jeder mensch zöd sei göd" - "Every man counts, every man counts his money".

Another one is part of the song "Gedscho" on sun, where the line "geht scho (wieder)" ("It's ok, I can still make it.") evolves into "geht scho wieder weida" ("Look, it continues").

== Musical style ==
The overall style changed continuously during their works, their first 2 albums, most and pflug were basically cover versions of traditional upper Austrian folk songs, played in punk style, with only slightly changed or adapted lyrics, spoken as rap.

luft (Air) was the first step away from tradition, as for the first time they wrote their own lyrics, in the sense of Austrian poet Ernst Jandl, some of the songs dealing with environmental and social issues. In the music the amount of distortion and feedback became painfully dominant, making luft maybe the most challenging album to listen to.

song was the next step in the development of Attwenger. Totally free of the noisiness and punky elements, the album contains three songs clocking in at around 15 minutes, which can be best compared to ethno or dub music, and a six-second word rap titled "Es gibt Wiederholungen" ("There are repeats"). For the first time plenty of electronic samples were used, and the lyrics were used rather as instrument than as carrier of message. The lyrics for each song consist only two or three sentences, whose words are only slightly varied (thus getting a different meaning), and repeated like mantras, sounding very similar to the accompanying mouth harp.

sun and dog represent another change of style, on one hand, the band returns to shorter songs, more aggressively addressing political and social criticism in their lyrics. The punkish style of the early days has returned to a small extent, but also hip-hop and trip-hop-elements have found their way into the music. The two albums also show increasing amount of melody, with some of the songs actually sung, rather than spoken.

== Discography ==
- Auf da Oim gengan die Kia (MC, 1990)
- most (1991)
- pflug (1992)
- ! Wirrwarr ! (CD-MINI, 1993)
- luft (1993)
- song (1997)
- sun (2002)
- dog (2005)
- dog2 remixes (2006)
- die Kia (CD, new release of 1990 MC, 2007)
- flux (2011)
- clubs (2013)
- spot (2015)
- drum (2021)
- wos (2026)

== See also ==
- Alpunk
