= Shell Beach (band) =

Hungarian post-hardcore band

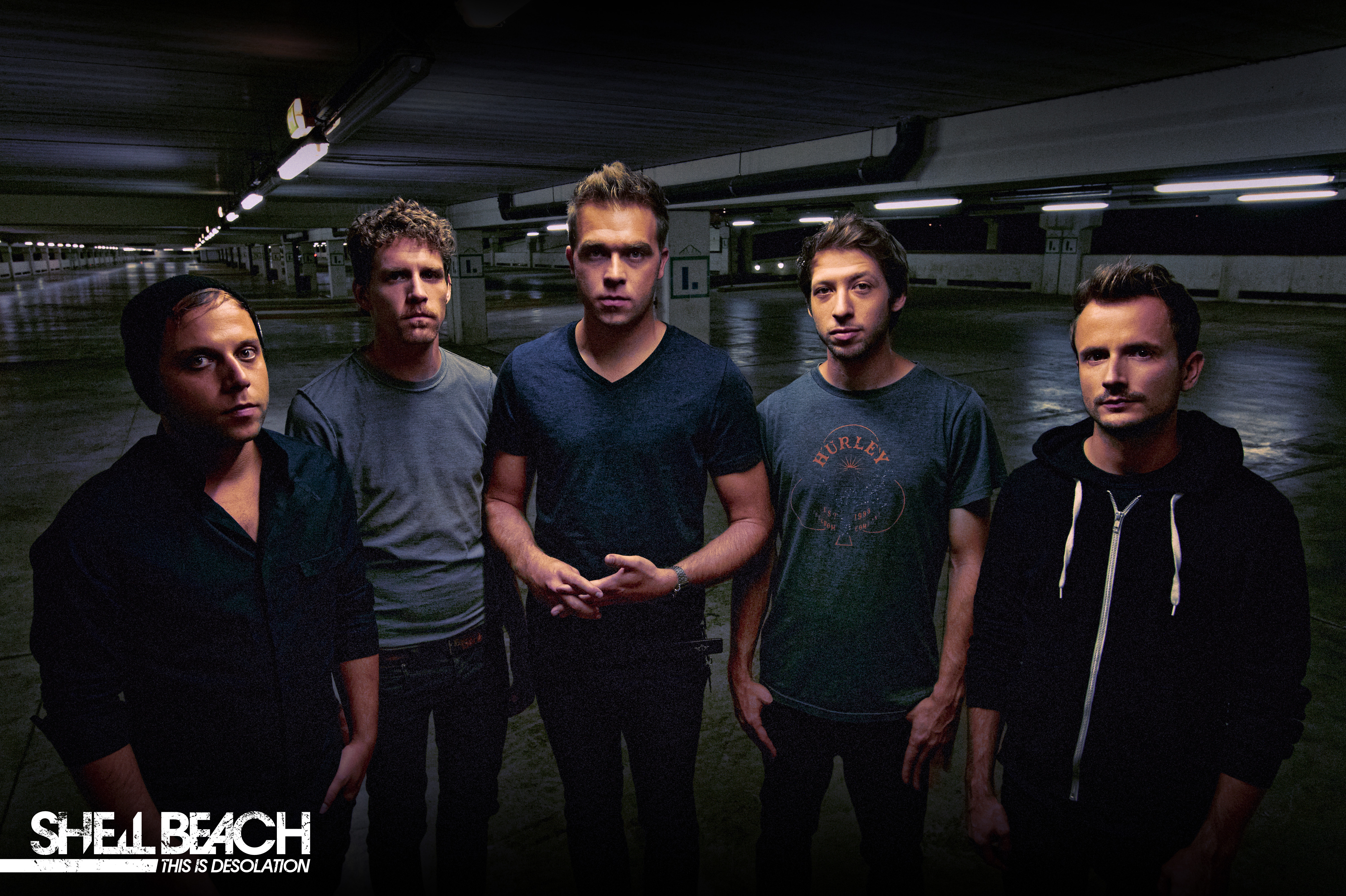
- Shell Beach band photo 2012.

Background information
- Origin: Budapest, Hungary
- Genres: Post-hardcore, alternative metal
- Years active: 2006-present
- Labels: Unsigned; Wildthing Records; EDGE Records; Redfield
- Members: Matyas Mohacsi, Pal Somlo, Viktor Sági, Bodóczy Zoltán, Dániel Szalay
- Past members: Attila Horvath, Balint Szollar, Daniel Ivanfi, Zoltan Totik
- Website: www.shellbeachband.com

Shell Beach is a post-hardcore band from Budapest, Hungary. The band has released two full-length albums and an EP.

Shell Beach released their debut album Acronycal in 2007 on Edge Records. The first new recording, a song titled "The Greatest Skeptic" from their upcoming album, was released online on the band's website in September 2011. Their anticipated second album This Is Desolation was released in 2012.

== History ==
Shell Beach was founded by long-time friends in 2006. The band name was inspired by the unreachable paradise destination from the movie Dark City. With the members each having played in bands from the Budapest underground scene (Daniel Ivanfi: Blind Myself, Matyas Mohacsi: The Idoru, Zoltan Totik: Velvet Stab, Pal Somlo: Buried By Time, Attila Horváth: Subscribe), the idea for starting a band together arose mutually. The post-hardcore/alternative outfit grew fast the following years. A demo and online presence enabled the band to tour. The debut record titled "Acronycal" was released in 2007. Ranging from the intense, hardcore-inspired waves of chaos, to the quiet, ambient, dreamlike passages, the music heard on “Acronycal” represented the daily struggles in life and the pursuit to find happiness. The 10 tracks showed that the band takes pride in their musical influences by acknowledging their many inspirations like Glassjaw, the Deftones or Refused etc. The first music video from the band for the song "Are We OK?" debuted on MTV in 2008.

=== This Is Desolation and Changes X Restless X Faithless ===
Touring helped mature the band's sound the following years. After a line-up change Viktor Sági became the new guitarist, with whom vocalist Zoltan had already played together within their previous band Velvet Stab. In 2010 the band started working on their second album. The first single The Greatest Skeptic premiered online in 2011 The second single released was Hirudinean in 2012.

This Is Desolation, the band's second album was released in November 2012. The 11-song record is a work of two years, has 88 tracks and includes Matt Geise of Lower Definition (Ferret) / Dance Gavin Dance (Rise Records) and Zeek as special guest vocalists in two of the songs, with Tamas Somlo playing the clarinet on track #9. The second record further helped Shell Beach get established as the most prominent band of the Hungarian and Budapest post-hardcore scenes. The album was recorded in Pannonia Studios and mixed and mastered by Dávid Schram.

Vital Signs, the first music video for the album was released in November, 2012. The video has been selected and placed in rotation on MTV Hungary and VIVA Hungary.

In late September Shell Beach announced their first European mini-tour with The Southern Oracle and Stubborn playing in cities such as Bratislava, Košice, Kraków, Opava, Hengelo, Zwijndrecht, Plochingen, Zürich, Frankfurt, and Prague.

In 2014 the band got to play on the Belgian GROEZROCK festival and toured with Enter Shikari and Roam.

In the beginning of 2016, the band released a digital-only EP, named "Changes X Restless X Faithless". It consists of five tracks.

=== Line-up changes ===
In May 2018 the band announced an EU tour with Adam Kills Eve and major line-up changes, including a new drummer, new vocalist and the return of Viktor Sági on guitars. The band also announced that they are employing the producering-songwriting skills of founding member Attila Horváth, who also appeared on stage with the band at some of the concerts. In July 2021 Shell Beach published their newest single and music video, Hero.

== Members ==
- Zoltán Bodóczy 'Undosz' – vocals (2018–present)
- Pál Somló – guitars, background-vocals (2006–present)
- Mátyás Mohácsi – bass (2006–present)
- Dániel Szalay – drums (2018–present)
- Viktor Sági – guitars (2007–2014, 2018–present)

== Former members ==
- Zoltán Totik – vocals (2006–2017)
- Attila Horváth – guitars (2006)
- Dániel Ivánfi – drums (2006–2017)
- Bálint Szollár – guitars (2014–2017)
- Dániel Gál – drums (2017)

== Discography ==
Shell Beach discography
- Studio albums: 3
- Music videos: 2

Albums

- Acronycal (2007)
- This Is Desolation (2012)
- Changes x Restless x Faithless (2016) - digital only EP

== Videography ==
- Are We OK? (2008)
- Vital Signs (2012)
- The Eclipse (2016)
- Run Out the Sun (2016)
