= Deliman =

- Born: Christian Lahodynsky; 10 January 1989 (age 36); Doebling, Vienna, Austria
- Genres: Reggae, dancehall
- Occupation: Singer-songwriter
- Instrument: Vocals
- Years active: 2009–present
- Labels: Union World Music, Bizzarri Records, House of Riddim
- Website: www.delimanmusic.com

Christian Lahodynsky (born 10 January 1989), better known by his stage name Deliman, is an Austrian reggae singer-songwriter who was born in Doebling, Vienna, Austria. He is established as one of Austria's best and most ambitious reggae artists.

== Early life/origins ==
He was born in Nussdorf, suburbs in the 19th District of Vienna "Doebling". His father worked for an Austrian newspaper, Die Presse, as a journalist. Due to his father's job, he spent the first six years of his life living in Belgium from 1989 to 1995. Afterwards, his family moved back to Austria, where he first encountered reggae music and developed his passion for the reggae culture. His parents had a large collection of records, including a reggae section.

He grew up listening to famous artists including Bob Marley, Black Uhuru, Steel Pulse, Ini Kamoze, Mighty Diamonds, Third World (band), Dennis Brown, Tony Tuff and Gregory Isaacs.

== Career ==
=== Early career ===
His music career began when he and his brother Stephan had founded a soundsystem called Trichromatic Sound, playing Reggae and Dancehall music in night clubs and parties in Vienna. He met a backing band called The Fireman Crew from Linz, Austria and began working on live performances. In February 2010, Deliman and The Fireman Crew were nominated for the Austrian Newcomer Award 2010. In June, they won the Austrian/Swiss Reggae Contest gaining the opportunity to perform at the Rototom Sunsplash in 2010.

=== Rise to fame ===
His professional music career as a reggae singer-songwriter began in 2009, where his first song "King of Kings" was recorded by the producer Sam Gilly, under the House of Riddim label. Paul Krackowizer, the drummer from The Fireman Crew founded the Union World Music label with Deliman to release his first album. He released his debut album Unconquerable on 23 September 2011 and his first EP Still Blazing on 10 January 2014, produced by a young hip hop producer, beatmaker and DJ "Phil Chronics", both under the Union World Music label.

He used social media including MySpace to get in touch with producers such as Bizzarri Records to release singles with other reggae artists. This is also how contacted met the young reggae band The Fireman Crew.

== Personal life ==
=== Family ===
He has an older brother named Stephan, whom he founded Trichromatic Sound with during the early stages of his reggae career. His father is a journalist for a magazine called Profil and his mother is a secretary.

== Discography ==
Studio albums

- Unconquerable (2011)
- Still Blazing EP (2014)
