= FreshFabrik =

Hungarian metal band

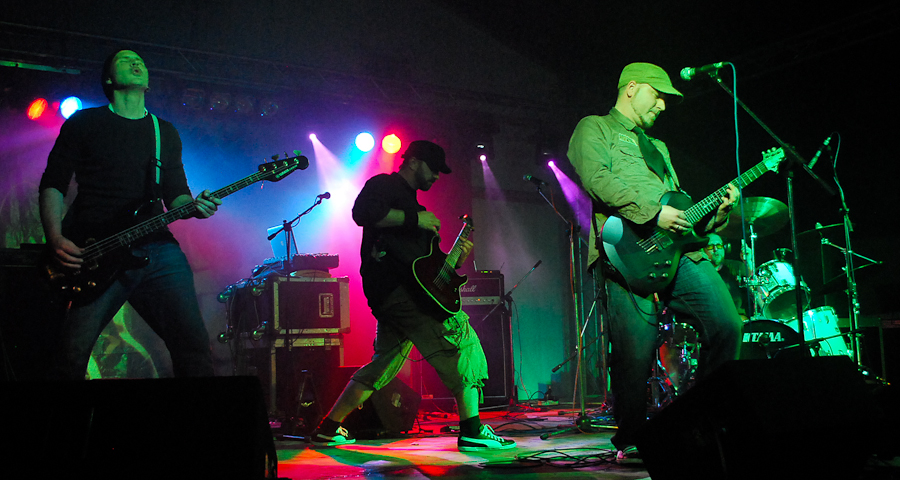
- FreshFabrik performing live in 2011, Miskolc

Background information
- Origin: Budapest, Hungary
- Genres: Nu metal; industrial rock; industrial metal; alternative metal
- Years active: 1993–present
- Labels: Warner Bros., Alexandra
- Members: András Szabó; Levente Kovács; Szabolcs Oláh; László Szvoboda; Istvan "Pityesz" Horvath; Matyas Koncz
- Past members: András Vörös; Dávid Schram; Béla Barabás; Tamás Somlai; Attila Németh; Sándor Berényi; Sándor Dula; Krisztián Keszei; Szabolcs Megyesi; András Bodrogi; Bence Balázs; Balázs Tanka; Réka Hain; Péter Újvári

FreshFabrik is a Hungarian industrial nu metal band consisting of Szabolcs Oláh aka (kju:) (vocals, guitars), András Szabó (drums) and Levente Kovács (bass & programming) and László Szvoboda (guitars, vox, synth.). FreshFabrik is the first Hungarian English-singing rock/metal band using DJ and rap performances, and the first Hungarian rock/metal band contracted to a major record label. FreshFabrik is one of the best-selling English-singing Hungarian rock bands of all time. After a three-year break, in 2011 they released a brand-new album MORA. In 2013, after a successful 20 years anniversary tour, FreshFabrik released a new single, and video Higher & Higher (Rock to the Boogie-Woogie) with reunited members: Istvan Horvath and Matyas Koncz.

== History ==
=== Years of beginning ===
FreshFabrik was founded by Andras Szabó and Levente Kovács in 1993, in Budapest, Hungary. In the autumn of 1994 the band was introduced supporting Run DMC in Budapest. That time the band signed a record deal with Hungarian Mute Licensee the band was nominated for the MTV Europe Video Contest and the nominated video appeared on MTV Europe's 120 Minutes. In the same year FreshFabrik released the debut album Certificado.

In 1995-97 the band was clubtouring all over Europe, and performed as supporting band to Nitzer Ebb in Budapest in 1997. That year, the band signed to Warner Music Hungary to release their second album, Nerve. After its success, Warner sent the band touring in Australia for the new album.

=== Years of success ===
In the early days of 2000 the band started working on the new album with Mr. Colson from Smart Studios (US) at the mixing desk. The band used the studio-break for performing live on the Pepsi Sziget Festival in Budapest as a headliner, among bands like Bad Religion and The Bloodhound Gang. The album Drive My Hand came out on 30 October 2000. On 8 March 2001 the band won Hungarian IFPI's Golden Giraffe Award (Hungarian Grammy) as 'The Best Domestic Modern Rock Album of the Year 2000'. In 2001 Warner Released Drive My Hand in the Czech Republic, and FreshFabrik was supporting Rammstein and AC/DC, in Prague in Strahov Stadium with an audience of 35,000 people.

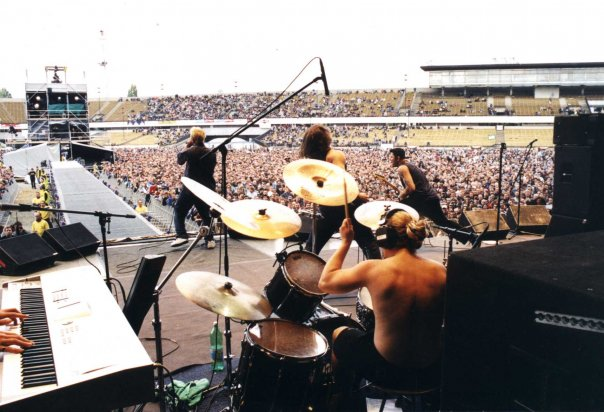
FreshFabrik performing live in Prague, 2001, supporting AC/DC and Rammstein

The band performed at the Sziget Festival again as a headliner, among bands like H-Blockx and New Model Army. The music video for "Lamentation" was nominated to the 'Comet' competition on VIVA TV. The "Lamentation" and "Drive My Hand" videos were appearing on VIVA2 in Germany. That time, the band was working on the release and promotion of Drive My Hand in cooperation with the Vice President A&R of Warner Music International in New York, organising showcases in Los Angeles and New York. Unfortunately the tragic events of September 11 temporarily made it impossible for the band to be present in the States. "Lamentation" appeared on the track list of the compilation New Generation released by Warner Music Czech Republic in November 2001 among superstars like Linkin Park, Wheatus, Deftones, Faith No More, Sugar Ray, Uncle Kracker, Kid Rock, Limp Bizkit, Missy Elliott, Crazy Town, Staind, HIM, Blink 182, Red Hot Chili Peppers, Guano Apes, The Bloodhound Gang and Papa Roach. In the summer of 2002 FreshFabrik played numerous gigs in Hungary, became a third-time headliner of the Pepsi Sziget Festival, and received an invitation to Austin, Texas for the SXSW Festival Summer.

=== Years of change ===
István Horváth, the frontman of FreshFabrik, left the band due to musical and personal reasons in 2003. The band started the new album's recording sessions with a new singer: Balázs Tanka. The album Dead Heart in Living Water was released in the February 2004. The band started touring twenty gigs all around Hungary, and the second single's ("Grace for Grace") came out. The one-year-term singer, Balázs Tanka, left the band, and István Horváth re-joined for a few months. After the scandalous departure, a new singer, Peter Ujvari joined the band for one single and video "On 'n' On". After the departure of Peter Ujvári, a new progressive rock, grunge singer Szabolcs Oláh (kju:) joined the band. He had gained fame as a finalist of the Hungarian talent show Megasztár. In 2006 FreshFabrik released a special best-of album, with the band's most popular songs re-recorded, remastered and partly renamed, due to copyright reasons. FreshFarbik toured and appeared many festivals. Played around Italy, Hungary and in the UK in 2007 supporting the heavy girl-band McQueen (UK).

=== Years apart ===
The band had few performances between 2007 and 2010. After an unsuccessful 15th anniversary concert, Levente Kovács declared in an interview that, "I don't see any chance to perform on stage under the name of FreshFabrik anymore to play TapTap. It makes no sense for me. It's only my opinion, there are many ways to do FreshFabrik without me, and maybe they will." So he left the band for one year, but Andras and Szabolcs, with former bass player Reka Hain played some shows with moderate success.

=== Years of a new beginning ===
In 2010 Levente Kovács, András Szabó and Szabolcs Oláh decided to continue FreshFabrik and started writing some new material. In November 2010, a new single and music video titled "Stealing the Sun" was released and hit radio charts, raising new popularity for the band. In the spring of 2011 Laszlo Szvoboda joined the band for live performances and started touring Hungary. Many festival appearances came and a very special show with the Hungarian National Radio Philharmonic Orchestra at Sziget Festival 2011, recorded live and in studio also. In June 2011 the band released a new album, MORA, which is the 5th in the row of FreshFabrik studio albums. Four videos were shot supporting MORA: Stealing The Sun, Woman, Into The Light and Orpheus.

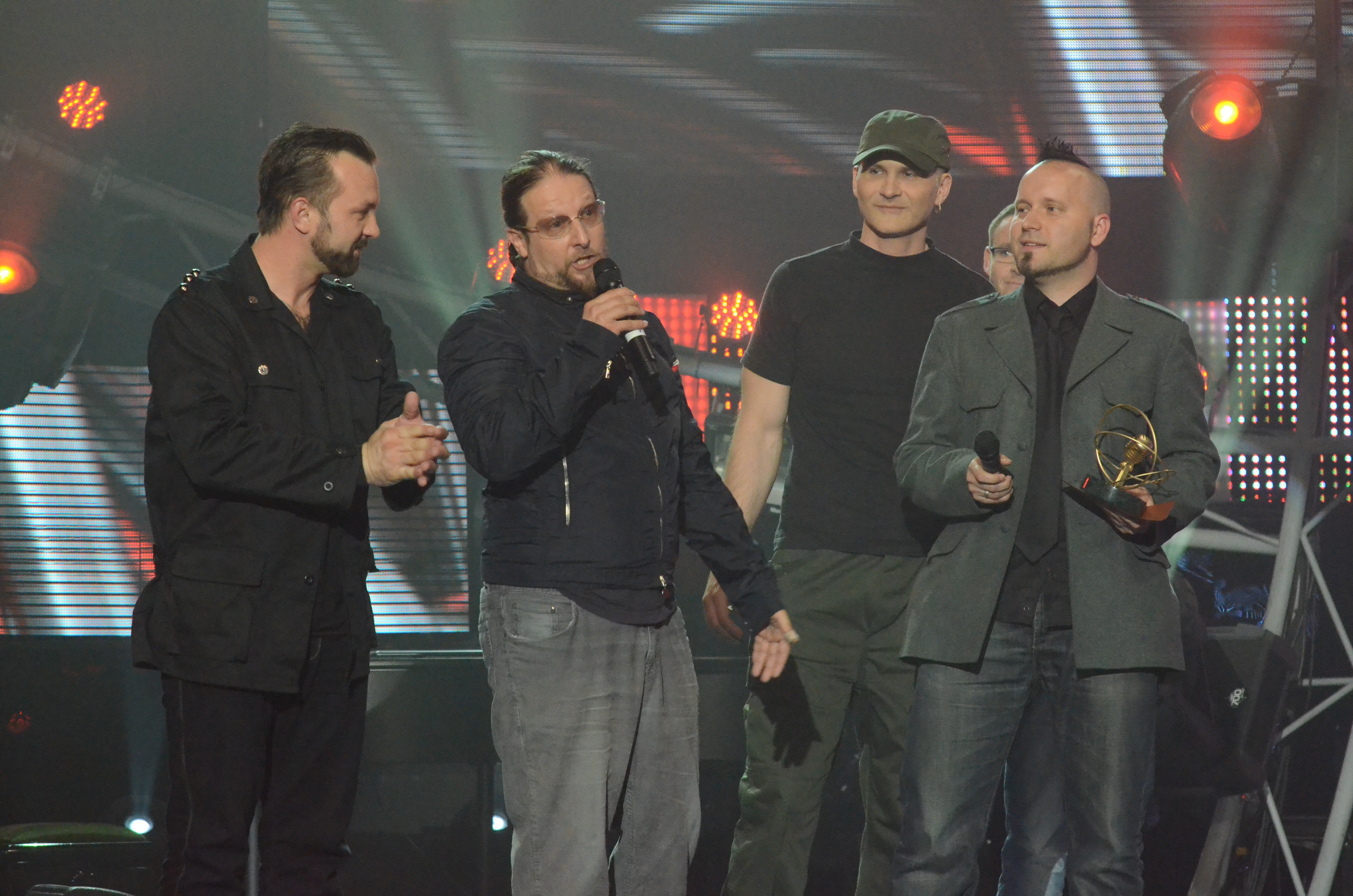
FreshFabrik at the Fonogram Awards Show 2012

On 8 May 2012, the FreshFabrik album MORA won "Best Domestic Modern Pop-Rock Album of 2011" at the Fonogram Hungarian Music Awards.

In 2013, after a successful 20 years anniversary tour, FRESHFABRIK released a new single, and video Higher & Higher (Rock to the Boogie-Woogie) with reunited members: Istvan Horvath and Matyas Koncz.

== Discography ==
=== Albums ===
- Certificado - 1994
- Nerve - 1997
- Drive My Hand - 2000
- Dead Heart in Living Water - 2004
- Finest - 2006
- MORA - 2011

== Videos ==
| 1997 | Freezing

| 1998 | Serious (Tap Tap)

| 2000 | Goofy with the Gun

| 2000 | Drive My Hand

| 2000 | Lamentation

| 2003 | Grace For Grace

| 2010 | Life Is Passing By | Levente Kovács

| 2011 | Stealing The Sun | Levente Kovács & Szabolcs Oláh

| 2011 | Into The Light | Levente Kovács

| 2011 | Woman | Levente Kovács

| 2012 | Orpheus | Levente Kovács & Szabolcs Oláh

| 2013 | Higher & Higher | Levente Kovács & Szabolcs Oláh |}

== Members ==
- Kju (Szabolcs Oláh) - vocals & guitar
- Istvan Horvath - vocals
- Levente Kovács - bass
- AndyTaylor (András Szabó) - drums
- László Szvoboda - guitars, vocals
- Matyas Koncz - guitars
