= Dávid Schram =

David Schram
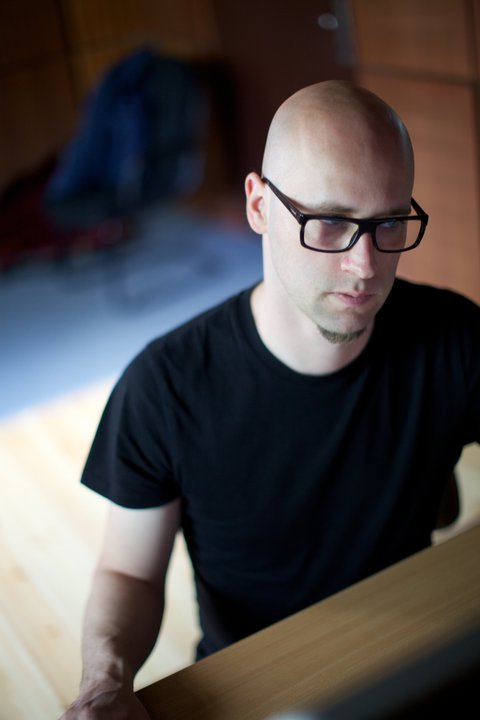

Background information
- Born: Budapest, Hungary
- Genres: Industrial, Hard rock
- Occupations: Guitarist, Producer, Sound Engineer, Remixer
- Formerly of: FreshFabrik

David Schram is Hungarian musician and record producer, best known internationally as the guitarist of the Hungarian rock band FreshFabrik and the producer of Sexepil's Your Scream Is Music, and Shell Beach's This Is Desolation.

== Life and career ==
In 2002 Schram obtained a Bachelor of Arts degree in recording engineering from the SAE Institute, Sydney Australia.

=== FreshFabrik ===
In September 1996, Schram joined FreshFabrik as a guitarist. He recorded the album entitled Nerve with the band in 1997. Two years after his arrival he left the band in September 1998. Schram later became the record producer for the band recording several albums such as MORA.

=== Production career ===
From 2002 to 2008 Schram worked for Warner Bros. in Budapest as a sound engineer. Schram started his record producer career by recording, mixing and mastering Heaven Street Seven's Szállj Ki és Gyalogolj in 2004 in Budapest at the Aquarium studios.

In 2006 Schram mixed Kistehén Tánczenekar's Szerelmes Vagyok Minden Nőbe.

In 2011 Schram was chosen as the producer of Veronika Harcsa's Lámpafény.

In 2012 Schram produced Shell Beach's This Is Desolation.

In 2013 Schram produced two songs (Wake The Coma Girl and Lybria) for The Challenger in Pieces's Fill Up The Airwaves EP.

Schram produced Sexepil's Your Scream Is Music which was released on 17 November 2014.

== Discography ==
FreshFabrik

- Nerve (1997)

== Production career ==
=== Production ===
- 2003: Yellojack – Quarantine
- 2003: Junkies – Hat
- 2003: Superbutt – The Unbeatable Eleven
- 2004: Heaven Street Seven – Szállj Ki és Gyalogolj
- 2004: Neotones – Mi vagyunk
- 2006: Heaven Street Seven – Tudom, hogy Szeretsz Titokban
- 2009: Future Millionaire – Alone
- 2012: Shell Beach – This Is Desolation
- 2013: The Challenger in Pieces – Fill Up The Airwaves
- 2013: Blahalouisiana – Tales of Blahalouisiana
- 2014: Sexepil - Your Scream Is Music

=== Recording ===
- 2004: Szakcsi Generation with DeJohnette & Patitucci – 8 Trios For 4 Pianists
- 2004: FreshFabrik – Dead Heart in Living Water
- 2009: Poniklo – Poniklo
- 2009: Takács Eszter – Ha egy nő szeret
- 2009: Dániel Szabó Trio Meets Chris Potter – Contribution

== See also ==
- FreshFabrik
- Notable Hungarian producers
