= This Is Desolation =

Studio album by Shell Beach
- Released: 21 January 2013
- Recorded: 2012
- Genre: Post-hardcore
- Length: 42:48
- Label: Redfield, Germany
- Producer: Dávid Schram

Shell Beach chronology
Acronycal (2007)	This Is Desolation (2013)

Professional ratings
Review scores
Source	Rating
Nuskull	(9/10)
Rockstation	(5/5)
Lángoló Gitárok	

This Is Desolation is the second full-length studio album recorded by Shell Beach. It was released in November, 2012.

== Recording and production ==
The band worked on this 11-song record for the past two years. The album has 11 tracks and includes Matt Geise of Lower Definition (Ferret) / Dance Gavin Dance (Rise Records) and Zeek as special guest vocalists in two of the songs, with Tamás Somló (Lokomotiv GT) playing the clarinet on track #9. The second record further helped Shell Beach get established as the most prominent band of the Hungarian and Budapest post-hardcore scenes. The album was recorded in Pannonia Studios and mixed and mastered by Dávid Schram.

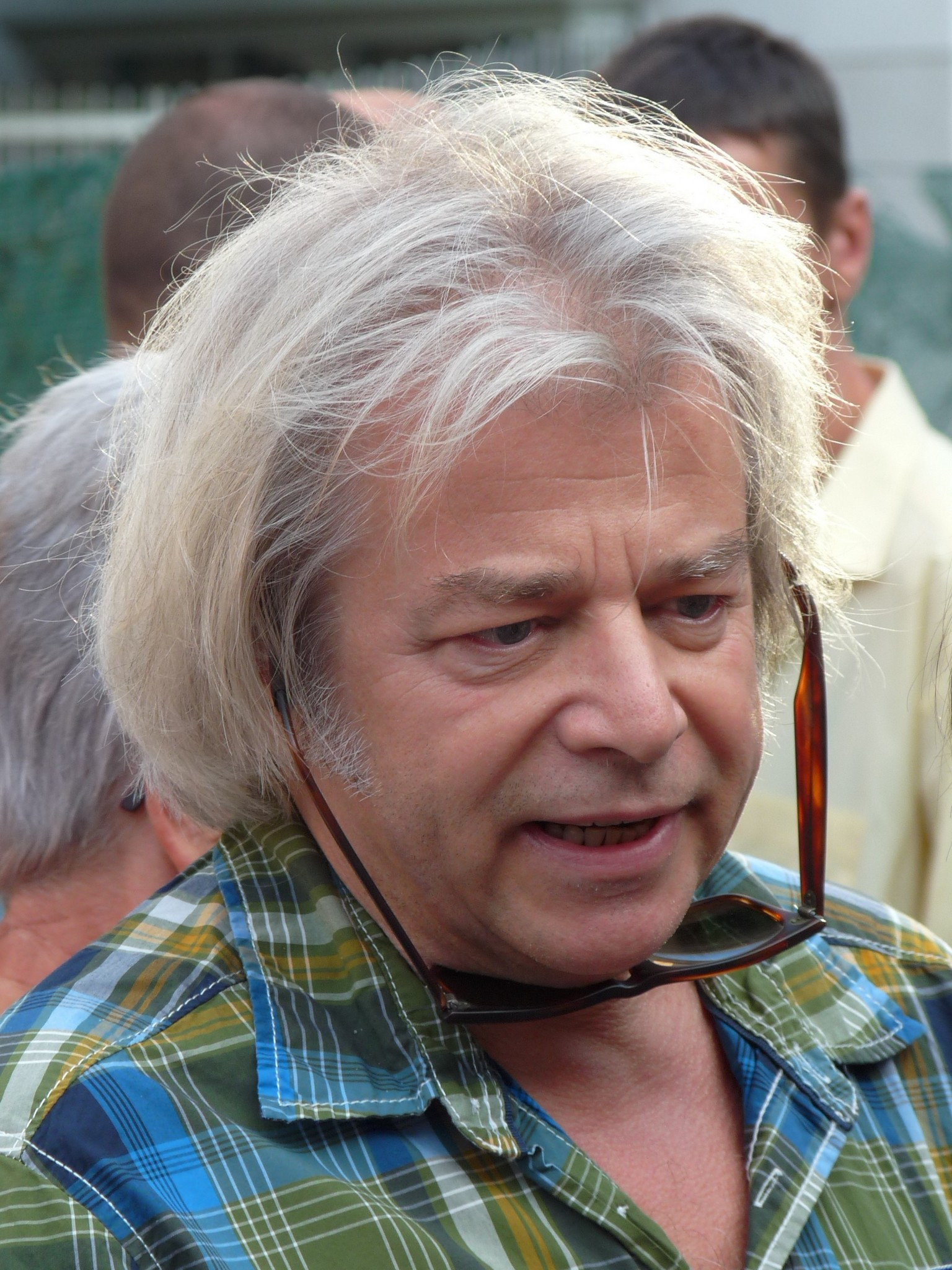
Tamás Somló of Lokomotiv GT, also Paul Somló's father, played the clarinet on the record

== Music videos ==
Vital Signs, the first music video for the album was released in November, 2012. The video has been selected and placed in rotation on MTV Hungary and VIVA Hungary.

== Track listing ==
1. "Hoverboards Don`t Work On Water"
2. "The Greatest Skeptic"
3. "Vital Signs"
4. "This Arm, These Vessels"
5. "Saviour"
6. "Hirudinean"
7. "Bjornoya"
8. "Black Xross"
9. "Sit Down, Navigator"
10. "Ghoat Node"
11. "The Sleep Paralysis (ft. Zeek)"

== Personnel ==
The following people contributed to This Is Desolation:

Shell Beach

- Zoltán Totik – vocals
- Pál Somló – guitars, background-vocals
- Viktor Sági – guitars
- Mátyás Mohácsi – bass
- Dániel Ivánfi – drums

Additional musicians and production

- Tamás Somló - clarinet (9)
- Matt Geise - vocals (1)
- MC Zeek - vocals (11)
- Dávid Schram - production, mixing and mastering
