= Csaba =

Csaba (Hungarian: [ˈt͡ʃɒbɒ]) is a Hungarian given name for males. Prince Csaba is the legendary son of Attila the Hun in Hungarian chronicles.

Individuals with the given name include:

- Csaba (chieftain) (10th century), Hungarian military leader, an inspiration for the Prince Csaba legend
- Csaba Almási (born 1966), Hungarian long jumper
- Csaba Ferenc Asztalos (born 1974), Romanian politician of Hungarian ethnicity
- Csaba Balog (born 1972), Hungarian footballer
- Csaba Balogh (born 1987), Hungarian chess grandmaster
- Csaba Bernáth (born 1979), Hungarian footballer
- Csaba Bőhm (born 2000), Hungarian modern pentathlete
- Csaba Borszéki (born 1983), Hungarian footballer
- Csaba Csáki, Hungarian physicist
- Csaba Csere, a former technical director and editor-in-chief of Car and Driver magazine
- Csaba Csizmadia (born 1985), Hungarian football manager and former player
- Csaba Czébely, former member of the Hungarian heavy metal band Pokolgép
- Csaba Elthes (1912–1995), Hungarian fencing master
- Csaba Fazekas (born 1973), Hungarian film director
- Csaba Fehér (born 1975), Hungarian footballer
- Csaba Földvári (born 1980), Hungarian footballer
- Csaba Gera (born 1977), Hungarian judoka
- Csaba Hende (born 1960), Hungarian politician and former Defense Minister of Hungary
- Csaba Horváth, multiple people
- Csaba Hüttner (born 1971), Hungarian sprint and marathon canoer
- Csaba Ködöböcz (born 1985), Hungarian footballer
- Csaba Könczei (born 1966), Romanian politician
- Csaba Köves (1966–2025), Hungarian fencer
- Csaba P. Kovesdy, American nephrologist
- Csaba Kuttor (born 1975), Hungarian triathlete
- Csaba Kuzma (born 1954), Hungarian boxer
- Csaba László, multiple people
- Csaba Madar (born 1974), Hungarian footballer
- Csaba Máté (born 1969), Hungarian football manager and player
- Csaba Mérő (born 1979), Hungarian amateur Go player
- Csaba Őry (born 1952), Hungarian politician
- Csaba Pintér (born 1967), bass player of the Hungarian heavy metal band Pokolgép since 1996
- Csaba Pléh (born 1945), Hungarian psychologist and linguist
- Csaba Regedei (born 1983), Hungarian footballer
- Csaba Siklós (1941–2026), Hungarian politician
- Csaba Somfalvi (born 1972), Hungarian footballer
- Csaba Somogyi (born 1985), Hungarian footballer
- Csaba Szabó, multiple people
- Csaba Szatmári, multiple people
- Csaba Székely, Hungarian playwright
- Csaba Szigeti, Hungarian singer, Eurovision Song Contest 1995 participant
- Csaba Tabajdi (born 1952), Hungarian politician
- Csaba Vastag (born 1982), Hungarian musician and X-Faktor 2010 winner
