= Jász-Nagykun-Szolnok County 2nd constituency (1990–2011) =

Jász-Nagykun-Szolnok County 2nd constituency (Jászapáti)
- Former Constituency for the National Assembly
- County: Jász-Nagykun-Szolnok

Former Constituency
- Created: 1990
- Abolished: 2011
- Replaced by: Constituency no. 2

The Jász-Nagykun-Szolnok County constituency no. 2 (Hungarian: Jász-Nagykun-Szolnok megye 02. számú egyéni választókerület) was one of the single member constituencies of the National Assembly, the national legislature of Hungary. The district was established in 1990, when the National Assembly was re-established with the end of the communist dictatorship. It was abolished in 2011.

== Members ==
The constituency was first represented by Béla Mizsei of the Independent Smallholders, Agrarian Workers and Civic Party (FKgP) from 1990 to 1994. Imre Szekeres of the Hungarian Socialist Party (MSZP) was elected in 1994 and served until 2002. In the 2002 election, István Járvás of Fidesz was elected representative. Imre Szekres of the MSZP was re-elected in 2006 and served until 2010. In 2010 election followed by János Pócs of Fidesz.

Election	Member	Party	%
1990	Béla Mizsei	FKgP	36.4
1994	Imre Szekeres	MSZP	48.0
1998	Imre Szekeres	MSZP	52.8
2002	István Járvás	Fidesz	54.6
2006	Imre Szekeres	MSZP	52.0
2010	János Pócs	Fidesz	54.2

== Election result ==
=== 1990 election ===
1990 parliamentary election: Jász-Nagykun-Szolnok County - 2nd constituency
Party	Candidate	Votes	%	±%
FKGP	Dr. Béla Mizsei	4,602	23.28	
MDF	Dr. Ákos Kecskés	3,916	19.81	
HVK	Sándor Török	3,125	15.81	
SZDSZ	Dr. László Juhász	2,764	13.98	
Agrarian Alliance	Menyhért Jánosi	1,848	9.35	
MSZP	ifj. László Gyarmati	1,694	8.57	
Independent	Antal Major	922	4.66	
MSZDP	László Ádám	894	4.52	
Turnout		20,486		
2nd round result
FKGP	Dr. Béla Mizsei	4,918	36.35	
MDF	Dr. Ákos Kecskés	4,896	36.18	
HVK	Sándor Török	3,717	27.47	
Turnout		13,758		
FKGP win (new seat)				
