= Heavy Medal =

Studio album by P. Mobil
- Released: May 16, 1983
- Recorded: Omega Studios
- Genre: Heavy metal Hard rock
- Length: 45:50
- Label: Start
- Producer: János Kóbor

P. Mobil chronology
Mobilizmo (1981)	Heavy Medal (1983)	Honfoglalás (1984)

Heavy Medal is the second studio album of Hungarian rock band P. Mobil, released in 1983.

The record was released in Eastern Europe and USSR.

== Track listing ==
1. Nem érhet baj (I'm Safe)
2. Lámpagyár (Lamp Factory)
3. Szép volt (It Was Beautiful)
4. Metalmánia (Metal Mania)
5. Az óra körbejárt (We Rocked Around the Clock)
6. Heavy Medal
7. Aranyásó szakkör (Gold Diggers' Club)
8. Hányas a kabát (What Size is Your Coat)
9. Pléhkrisztus (Tin Christ)

=== CD bonus tracks (2003) ===
1. Forma I. (Formula 1) (1978, single)
2. Utolsó cigaretta (One More Drag) (1978, single)
3. Bíborlepke (Purple Butterfly) (1976, demo)
4. Asszonyt akarok (I Want a Woman) (1976, demo)
5. Örökmozgó (Perpetuum Mobile) (1976, demo)
6. Lőj rám! (Shoot Me!) (1977/78, demo)
7. A király (The King) (1977/78, demo)
8. Go On (1978/79, English demo)
9. Tuppence Song (1978/79, English demo)
10. Night of Phoenix (1978/79, English demo)

== Line-up ==
- László Kékesi – bass, backing vocals
- István Mareczky – drums, percussion
- Vilmos Sárvári – guitars, backing vocals
- Lóránt Schuster - band-leader, lyrics, backing vocals
- Péter Tunyogi - lead vocals
- András Zeffer – keyboards, backing vocals

=== On bonus tracks ===
- Sándor Bencsik – guitars, backing vocals
- István Cserháti – keyboards, backing vocals
- Zoltán Pálmai – drums, percussion (1976–1977)
- Gyula Vikidál – lead vocals
