= Jász-Nagykun-Szolnok County 2nd constituency =

Hungarian national legislative constituency

Jász-Nagykun-Szolnok County 2nd constituency (Jászberény)
- Constituency for the National Assembly
- Location of Jász-Nagykun-Szolnok county 02 within Jász-Nagykun-Szolnok county

- Location of Jász-Nagykun-Szolnok county within Hungary
- County: Jász-Nagykun-Szolnok
- Electorate: 72,839 (2018)
- Major settlements: Jászberény

Current constituency
- Created: 2011
- Party: Tisza Party
- Member: Ferenc Tibor Halmai
- Created from: Constituency no. 1; Constituency no. 2
- Elected: 2026

The 2nd constituency of Jász-Nagykun-Szolnok County (Hungarian: Jász-Nagykun-Szolnok megyei 02. számú országgyűlési egyéni választókerület) is one of the single member constituencies of the National Assembly, the national legislature of Hungary. The constituency standard abbreviation: Jász-Nagykun-Szolnok 02. OEVK.

Since 2026, it has been represented by Ferenc Tibor Halmai of the Tisza Party.

== Geography ==
The 2nd constituency is located in north-western part of Jász-Nagykun-Szolnok County.

The constituency borders with 3rd constituency of Heves County to the north and northeast, 3rd constituency to the east, 1st constituency and 12th constituency of Pest County to the south and 9th constituency of Pest County to the west.

=== List of municipalities ===
The constituency includes the following municipalities:

1. Alattyán
2. Jánoshida
3. Jászágó
4. Jászalsószentgyörgy
5. Jászapáti
6. Jászárokszállás
7. Jászberény
8. Jászboldogháza
9. Jászdózsa
10. Jászfelsőszentgyörgy
11. Jászfényszaru
12. Jászivány
13. Jászjákóhalma
14. Jászkisér
15. Jászladány
16. Jászszentandrás
17. Jásztelek
18. Pusztamonostor
19. Tiszasüly
20. Újszász

== History ==
The 2nd constituency of Jász-Nagykun-Szolnok County was created in 2011 and contained parts of the pre-2011 abolished constituencies of 1st and 2nd of this County. Its borders have not changed since its creation.

== Members ==
The constituency was first represented by János Pócs of the Fidesz from 2014, and he was re-elected in 2018 and 2022. In the 2026 election, Ferenc Tibor Halmai of the Tisza Party was elected representative.

Election	Member	Party	%	Ref.
2014	János Pócs	Fidesz	42.80	
2018	János Pócs	Fidesz	51.21	
2022	János Pócs	Fidesz	59.81	
2026	Ferenc Tibor Halmai	TISZA	51.27	

== Election result ==
=== 2022 election ===
Result 2022
1. János Pócs, Fidesz–KDNP (59.8%)
2. Dr. Ottó Kertész, United for Hungary (33.7%)
3. Gyula Dobrán, Our Homeland (4.50%)
4. Nándor Oszvald, MEMO (1.20%)
5. Other parties (less than 1%) (0.80%)

2022 parliamentary election: Jász-Nagykun-Szolnok County - 2nd constituency
Party	Candidate	Votes	%	±%
Fidesz–KDNP	János Pócs	28,215	59.81	+8.60
United for Hungary	Dr. Ottó Kertész	15,915	33.74	
Mi Hazánk	Gyula Dobrán	2,116	4.49	New
MEMO	Nándor Oszvald	551	1.17	New
NÉP	György Magda	265	0.56	New
Leftist Alliance	Imréné Balogh	111	0.24	
Majority		12,300	26.07	
Turnout		47,749	67.39	▲0.67
Registered electors		70,852		
Fidesz–KDNP hold		Swing	+8.4	

=== 2018 election ===
Result 2018
1. János Pócs, Fidesz–KDNP (51.2%)
2. Lóránt Budai, Jobbik (33.5%)
3. Dr. József Gedei, DK (8.10%)
4. Béla Eszes, LMP (4.30%)
5. Other parties (less than 1%) (2.90%)

2018 parliamentary election: Jász-Nagykun-Szolnok County - 2nd constituency
Party	Candidate	Votes	%	±%
Fidesz–KDNP	János Pócs	24,549	51.21	+8.41
Jobbik	Lóránt Budai	16,054	33.5	+3.44
DK	József Gedei	3,893	8.12	as Unity
LMP	Béla Eszes	2,035	4.25	+1.83
MKKP	Marianna Csinger	372	0.78	New
Momentum	István Pálffy	298	0.62	New
Workers' Party	Dávid Kalmár	161	0.34	−0.29
Together	Imre Urbán	105	0.22	as Unity
Family Party	Gyula Varga	87	0.18	
NEEM	Ferenc Pethes	62	0.13	
MIÉP	Tibor József Geiszler	52	0.11	
Értünk Értetek	Zoltán Horváth	45	0.09	
Motherland Party	László Jámbor	37	0.08	−0.32
MCP	József Dani	30	0.06	
Common Ground	Antalné Klepács	27	0.04	
EU.ROM	Zoltán Farkas	21	0.04	
Tenni Akarás	Csaba Radics	21	0.04	
KÖSSZ	István Péterné	19	0.04	
Democratic Party	Pál Oláh	19	0.04	
Medete Party	Róbert Kanálos	18	0.04	
ÖP	Mária Zsákainé Fehér	15	0.03	−0.1
Iránytű	Ferenc Keskeny	7	0.01	
NP	Éva Erika Kerezsiné Kádár	5	0.01	
Majority		8,495	17.71	
Turnout		48,597	66.72	▲9.28
Registered electors		72,839		
Fidesz–KDNP hold		Swing	+5.0	

=== 2014 election ===
Result 2014
1. János Pócs, Fidesz–KDNP (42.8%)
2. Lóránt Budai, Jobbik (30.1%)
3. Dr. Imre Szekeres, Unity (20.1%)
4. Ottó Ménkű, LMP (2.40%)
5. Other parties (less than 1%) (4.50%)

2014 parliamentary election: Jász-Nagykun-Szolnok County - 2nd constituency
Party	Candidate	Votes	%	±%
Fidesz–KDNP	János Pócs	18,200	42.8	
Jobbik	Lóránt Budai	12,783	30.06	
Unity	Dr. Imre Jenő Szekeres	8,594	20.21	
LMP	Ottó Ménkű	1,027	2.42	
FKGP	Isván Járvás	367	0.86	
Independent	János Nagy	344	0.81	
Workers' Party	Kristóf Tamás Turi	161	0.63	
JESZ	István Dankó	210	0.49	
SMS	Erzsébet Kövendi	183	0.43	
Motherland Party	László Jámbor	172	0.4	
KTI	Dr. János Liszák	134	0.32	
Soc Dems	Kálmán Kökény	131	0.31	
ÖP	László Pásztor	56	0.13	
Nemzeti Érdekért	Károly Szűcs	25	0.06	
MGP	András Korsós	24	0.06	
Majority		5,417	12.74	
Turnout		43,039	57.44	
Registered electors		74,927		
Fidesz–KDNP win (new seat)				
