= Endre Csillag =

Hungarian musician

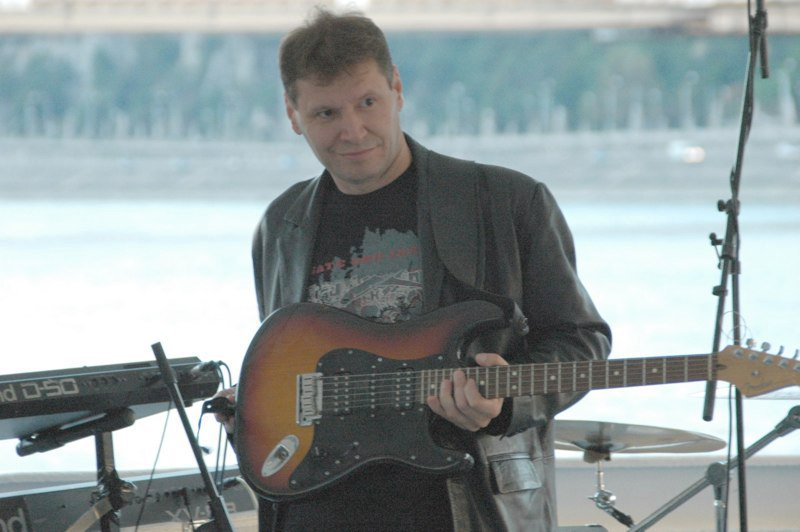
Endre Csillag

Endre Csillag (born October 12, 1957 in Budapest) is a Hungarian rock/blues guitarist. His nickname is Csuka (means northern pike or sneaker).

== Guitarist ==
- Hobó Blues Band
- Kormorán
- Edda Művek
- Culture Kings
- Funk Bizzness
- D.Nagy és a Frakció
- Németh Gábor Project
- Bikini
- Rolls Frakció
- Deák Bill Gyula

== Music author ==
- Kormorán
- Edda Művek
- D.Nagy és a Frakció
- Heaven
- Kalapács József
- Hard
- Deák Bill Gyula

== Discography ==
Year	Band	Album	Notes
1984	Kormorán	Folk and Roll	
1986	Attila Pataky & Lajos D. Nagy	Veled vagyok	single
1986	Edda Művek	Edda 6.	
1987	Edda Művek	Fohász	single – from Edda 7.
1992	Suti's Blues Family	Blues News	Austria
1993	Bikini	Búcsúkoncert	
1995	Jeff Wholgenannt	Nighthawk feeling	Austria
1995	D. Nagy és a Frakció	Budapest felett...	
1996	Endre Csillag	Wherever You Go	Austria
1996	Shooting Star	The Sound of Leonding	Austria
1996	Kalapács	Rockalapács	
1997	The Power of Soul	Tribute to Jimi Hendtix	Austria
1997	Tátrai–Mohai–Alapi–Csillag	G-pont	
2000	Illés Lajos	Betlehem csillaga	
2003	Németh Gábor Project	Könnyű Lépések	
2004	Németh Gábor Project	Live	DVD
2004	Bikini	Valahol valamikor	DVD
2005	Sláger Rádió	Megaparty	with Bikini – CD/DVD
2007	Hard	100% HARD	CD/DVD
2008	Deák Bill Gyula	60th birthday	DVD
2008	Deák Bill Gyula	Hatvan csapás	
2009	Deák Bill Gyula	A király meséi	
2009	Kormorán	Tüzek elött tüzek után	
2015	Csillag Endre	Csillagok és gyémántok	
2018	Zártosztály	Őrült Érzés	2 CD + DVD
