= Diana Groó =

Hungarian film director and screenwriter

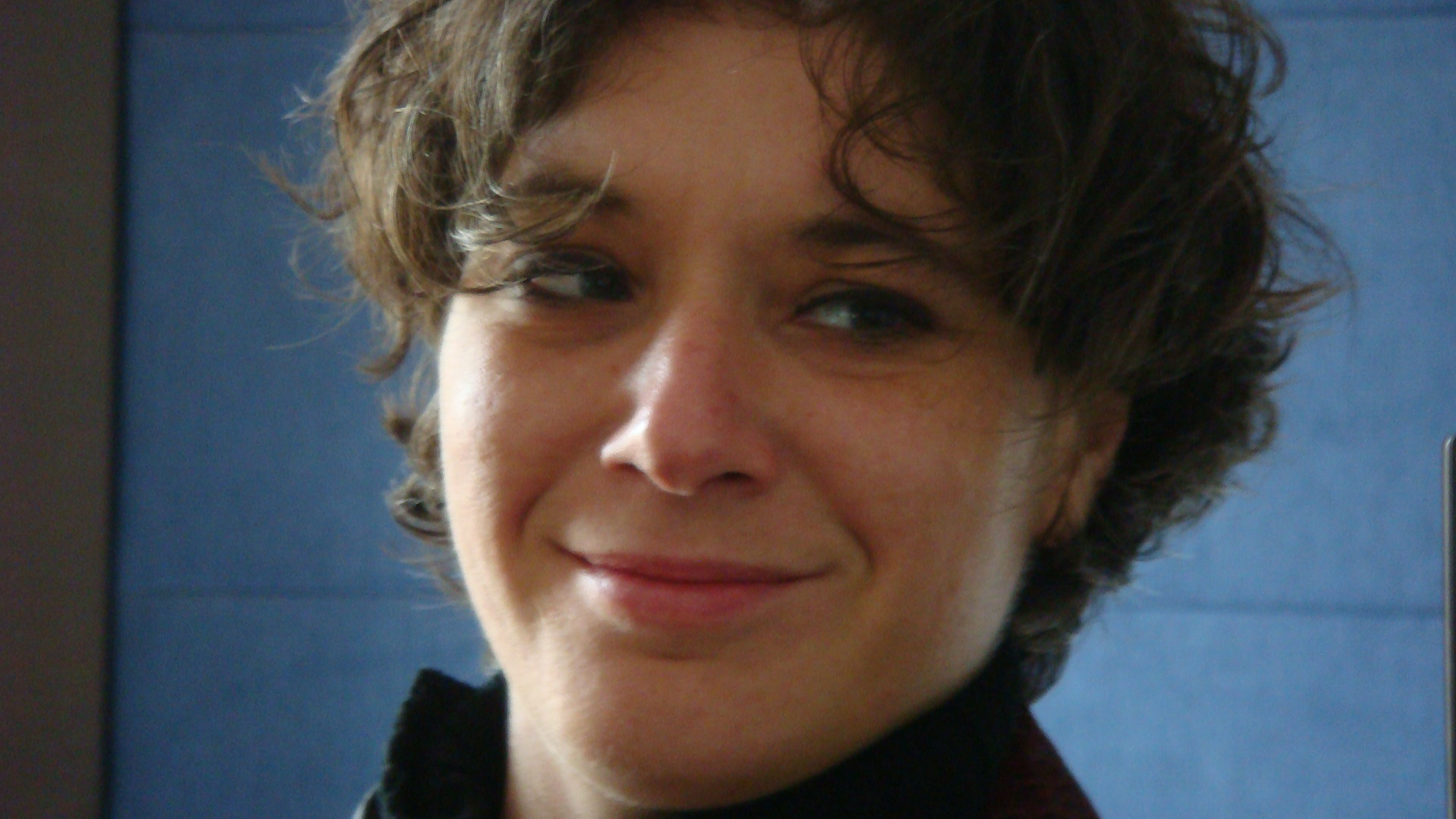
- Born: Budapest, Hungary
- Occupations: Film director Screenwriter
- Years active: 1992–present

Diana Groó (born 10 September 1973 in Budapest) is a Hungarian film director, screenwriter producer and associate professor.

== Education ==
Groó attended the Radnóti Secondary School in Budapest with a specialization in English and Russian, and after graduation she applied to University of Theatre and Film Arts in Budapest, but was not admitted. In 1992 she began her university studies at the Faculty of Humanities of University of Szeged, where she majored in French language and literature, and from 1993 she continued her studies in French and Hebrew at the Faculty of Humanities of Eötvös Loránd University.

Beside her university studies she worked as assistant director of Judit Elek and Pál Schiffer at Hunnia Filmstúdió. Between 1995 and 2000, she studied film and television directing at the University of Theatre and Film Arts in the class of Sándor Simó, where she received an undivided degree. Later, between 2015 and 2018, she completed the doctoral school at the same institution, earning the title of Doctor of Liberal Arts (DLA).

== Career ==
Groó's first success came with the short documentary Trapé (1996), which was her first-year exam work at the Film Academy. The film tells the story of Erwino, a 70-year-old Hungarian trapeze artist of a travelling circus, who decided to perform his show again after a long break. Groó followed her protagonist and lived with the travelling circus for 6 months which made possible for her to film not only the eagerly awaited moment of the premiere but also to reveal the secret Nazi past of the old artist. Groó received her first festival recognition for this documentary at Art Film Fest in 1997. The Award for the Best Newcomer was given by Geraldine Chaplin and Krzysztoff Zanussi. During her film studies she directed the award-winning short documentary Ottavio (together with Attila Kékesi) and the short film Melody of the street (1999).

Groó earned her MA in film directing in 2000. After graduation she co-founded Katapult Film Production company along with her director fellows (Ferenc Török, György Pálfi, Szabolcs Hajdu, Csaba Fazekas).

Between 2001-2006, she turned to making experimental animation and she directed Wild Imagination, an experimental art-history series about Marc Chagall, P. Auguste Renoir, Henrie Rousseau, Pieter Bruegel and Lajos Gulácsy.

In 2005, the first four episodes of the series opened the contemporary art exhibition of Herzliya Museum of Contemporary Art. The series was selected into the InterMedia courses of Haifa University along with the works of Peter Greenaway, Derek Jarman and others.

Her feature debut, Miracle in Cracow (2004), a piece of Jewish magical realism (starring Jerzy Trela, Franciszek Pieczka, Stanisława Celińska, Itala Békés, Eszter Bíró, Maceiej Adamczyk) was co-produced by Krzysztof Zanussi.

Her second feature film, Vespa (2010), a Hungarian-Serbian road movie featuring a Romani teenager won the Unicef Award of Terra di Siena Film Festival, and the Prix du Reflet d’Or for best direction at the Geneva International Film Festival Cinema Tous Ecrans.

Groó's poetic documentary Regina (2013) based on a single photograph tells the story of Regina Jonas, the world's first woman rabbi. Winner of the Lia Award at 30th Jerusalem Film Festival, the Warsaw Phoenix Award of Jewish Motifs International Film Festival (2014), Jury Award of 1.st Moscow Jewish Film Festival and featuring Rachel Weisz (English voiceover) and Martina Gedeck (German voiceover) as the voice of Regina Jonas. George Weisz, father of Rachel Weisz, was the film's executive producer. Screened at the International Holocaust Remembrance Day at UNESCO (2014), at the Library of Congress (2014) and deposited in the Visual Center Collection at Yad Vashem.

In 2013, Groó co-founded DunaDock Master Class International Documentary Forum, along with Julianna Ugrin producer, Klára Trencsényi director and Ágnes Böjte executive producer. In 2018, she became the Head of the Film and Media Specialization at Budapest Metropolitan University.

== Theatre ==
In 2008, Groó directed Kathrine Kathrine Kressmann Taylor's epistolary novel Address Unknown at the Spinóza Theatre, Budapest. The play ran for more than 8 years.

== Filmography ==
Year	Title	Genre	Awards / Notes
2013	Regina	documentary	Lia Award 30. - Jerusalem Film Festival 2013; Best Film - Art Film Festival Szolnok, Hungary 2013; Hungarian Filmcritic's Award 2014; Warsaw Phoenix Award - Warsaw Jewish Motifs Film Festival 2014; Jury Award - 1.st Moscow Jewish Film Festival
2012	Between Mountains and Seas / Child of Picasso: " Gaya"	documentary	
2010	Vespa	feature	Best Actor - Hungarian Film Festival 2010; Best Music - Hungarian Film Festival 2010; UNICEF Special Award -Terra di Siena International Filmfestival 2010; Reflet d'Or, Best director - Cinéma Tous Écrans, 2010; Dialogue Prix - Cottbus International Film Festival, 2010; Best Film - 10th^{.}Hungarian Film Festival, Los Angeles, 2010; Best Youth Actor - Olympia Film Festival, Greece 2011
2010	Eldorado	short	
2006	Wild Imagination / The Garden of the Magician	experimental	FIPA - Biarritz 2007, in competition
2006	Urlicht	short	
2006	What Lies Ahead	documentary	Audience Award -Versio Human Rights Film Festival, Budapest 2007
2004	Miracle in Cracow	feature	Best Producer Award for Gábor Garami- Hungarian Film Festival 2005; Golden Remi Award - Houston Worldfest 2005
2004	Wild Imagination / Rousseaus's Dreams	experimental	Golden Chest - Plovdiv International TV Film Festival 2004
2004	Wild Imagination / Flemish Proverbs - Bruegel's Dreams	experimental	Best Experimental - Camera Hungaria 2005
2003	Wild Imagination / Renoir's Dreams	experimental	Best Experimental - Antalya Golden Orange International Film Festival 2003; Silver Remi-Award - Houston Worldfest 2004
2001	Over the Village - Chagall's Dreams	experimental	FICC Award - Kosice International Art Film Festival 2001; Best European Video - Malaga Unicaja Video Festival 2001; Best Experimental - Evora International Short Film Festival 2002
2001	Córesz / Ways	documentary	Doc Leipzig 2002
1999	Melody of the Street	short	Best Film "On the Road" - Art Film Festival 1999; OCIC Special Mention - Molodist International Film Festival 1999; Grand Prix - 1st Hungarian Ecumenical Film Festival 1999
1998	Blue Eyes	TV	
1997	Ottavio	documentary	The Propeller Award - Motovun Film Festival 1999
1996	Trapé	documentary	Best Short Documentary - Hungarian Film Festival 1997; Best Film "On the Road" - Kosice International Art Film Festival 1997; Best Youth Documentary - Mediawave 1997; Best Youth Documentary - Hungarian Filmcritics' Award 2000
1995	Oncle Zsiga	documentary	
1992	Annuska	short	
