= P-box =

P-box may refer to:

- permutation box
- probability box
- privacy box, used by the Winston Smith Project#P-Box project
- P. Box (band)
