= Péter Kun =

Hungarian musician

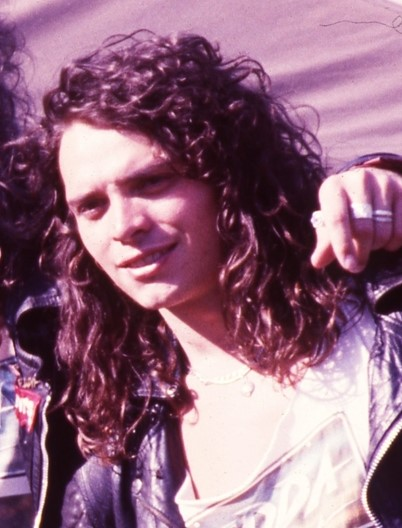

Background information
- Born: October 29, 1967; Pusztaszabolcs, Fejér, Hungary
- Died: July 10, 1993 (aged 25) between Agárd and Velence, Hungary
- Genres: Hard rock, Heavy metal, Speed metal
- Occupation(s): Singer, guitarist
- Years active: 1984–1993
- Formerly of: Triton; Magazin; Sing Sing; Pokolgép; Edda művek
- Website: 9386.atw.hu

Péter Kun (October 29, 1967 – July 10, 1993) was a Hungarian hard rock guitarist. He played for rock bands such as Pokolgép and Edda művek. He died in a motorcycle accident in 1993; he was 26 years old. He is regarded as one of the most accomplished young guitarists of his time.

He has a daughter, Petra Kun.

== Bands ==
- 1984–88: Triton (Százhalombatta)
- 1988–89: Magazin (Százhalombatta)* 1989–90: Sing Sing (Százhalombatta)
- 1990: Kenguru (Százhalombatta)
- 1990: Új Triton (Százhalombatta)
- 1990–91: Pokolgép (Budapest)
- 1991–93: Edda művek (Budapest)
