= Pokolgép =

Hungarian metal band

- Origin: Budapest, Hungary
- Genres: Heavy metal; speed metal; power metal
- Years active: 1980–present
- Labels: Hammer; Nephilim; Hungaroton
- Members: Richárd Bánhegyesi; Gábor Kukovecz; Zalán Z. Kiss; Csaba Pintér; Márk Kleineisel
- Past members: László Németh; József Kalapács; Joe Rudán; József Révi; István Maza; László Nagyfi; Péter Kun; Norbert Jung; László Láris; Endre Paksi; György Pazdera; Dezsó Nógrádi; András Gyenizse; László Tarcza; László "Wladi" Karp; Ede Szilágyi; Dávid Nagy; Csaba Czébely; Veress Márton; Attila Tóth
- Website: pokolgep.hu

Pokolgép is a Hungarian heavy metal band formed in the early 1980s (around 1982). They were among the first heavy metal bands in Hungary along with Moby Dick. The name "Pokolgép" literally means Infernal Machine, but is the Hungarian word for a home-made bomb. Pokolgép played alongside Motörhead in 1984 and Metallica in 1988.

== History ==
=== The early years ===
The founding members of Pokolgép were Gábor Kukovecz, Endre Paksi and Tibor Varga in the late 1970s. Kukovecz took guitar lessons from Prognózis guitarist/singer István Vörös who suggested that the name of the metal band be "Kommandó", which sounded less offensive. They used this name for some months before changing it back to Pokolgép. At the beginning of their music career, they were going through a rough patch because of their poverty and the government's negative attitude towards the band. They had been playing semi-illegal concerts on the outskirts of Budapest and as a result, they found unexpected success. They had had several drummers and guitarists until they found László Nagyfi for playing the second guitar and András Gyenizse for drums. In 1985, Paksi left the band due to personal conflicts (he couldn't agree with Kukovecz on the leading of the band) and went on to form Ossian. He was replaced by György Pazdera on the bass guitar. Some months later, Gyenizse emigrated to the US, so Pazdera invited his old friend László Tarcza to join them.
In 1983 the band was the runner-up in Ki mit tud? (a state-organised talent-searching festival), so they were allowed to record a song ("Kegyetlen asszony") which was released on a split 7-inch single. They also recorded two songs in the Hungarian Radio in 1984 ("Cirkusz és rács" and "A bűn"). In 1985 they recorded and released their first single with two songs ("A Sátán" and "A maszk").

=== The first albums ===
A very special thing happened in 1986: the government allowed Hungaroton to release the first heavy metal album in Hungary. This was the debut album of Pokolgép, titled Totális Metal. This was the time heavy metal bands started to come to the Eastern bloc (e.g. Iron Maiden and Queen), mainly to Poland and Hungary. Pokolgép played before Metallica and Motörhead in the late 1980s. In 1987 Pokolgép released their second album, Pokoli színjáték. Pokoli színjáték was first played in concert, and released days after.
In 1988-89, Pokolgép went on a European tour, playing in the two German states, the Netherlands and Belgium, and released their third album in 1989 (title: Éjszakai bevetés). They recorded a concert at the end of 1989 in Petőfi Hall, and then released as the fifth album in 1990 with the title "Koncertlemez". Before releasing the concert audio footage, they made their fourth album, "Metál az ész". This album was made in a rather bad atmosphere, as guitarist Nagyfi and vocalist Kalapács were about to quit the band.

=== Lineup changes ===
Nagyfi said in an interview that Kukovecz and he could not agree on the style of music to be played. Nagyfi preferred raw, more impulsive and speedy songs, while Kukovecz liked solos and melodies. This led to Nagyfi and Kalapács leaving to form Omen. The remaining three Pokolgép members, Tarcza, Pazdera and Kukovecz started to look for a new singer and second guitarist. Péter Kun briefly joined as guitarist before leaving to join Edda művek. The vocalist became József Rudán from Coda, a Led Zeppelin tribute band.

=== Controversy ===
On 27 December 1987 a fifteen-year-old man Lajos "Szőrme" Varga suffered a severe accident during the Metál Karácsony festival held in the Petőfi Csarnok event hall. A pyrotechnic device exploded and pieces of it hit Szőrme's head causing a traumatic injury. Szőrme's head almost collapsed into two pieces, as his corpus callosum was cut by the pyrotechnic device. He was in a coma for three months and nearly died several times but doctors were able to save his life. Pokolgép still deny their responsibility for this accident. Szőrme is not able to work or establish proper social contacts, but his mental capacity is still above average.

== Most consistent lineups ==
- 1985-90 József Kalapács, Gábor Kukovecz, László Nagyfi, György Pazdera, László Tarcza
- 2001-06 Joe Rudán, Gábor Kukovecz, Dávid Nagy, Csaba Pintér, Ede Szilágyi
- 2014-24 Attila Tóth, Gábor Kukovecz, Zalán Z. Kiss, Csaba Pintér, Márk Kleineisel

== Members ==
=== Current lineup ===
- Richárd Bánhegyesi − lead vocals (2024–present)
- Gábor Kukovecz − solo guitar (1982–present)
- Zalán Z. Kiss − rhythm guitar (2011–present)
- Csaba Pintér − bass guitar (1996–present)
- Márk Kleineisel − drums (2014–present)

=== Past members ===
Vocals

- László Németh (1982)
- József Kalapács (1982-1990)
- József Rudán (1990-2010)
- Attila Tóth (2010–2024)

Guitars

- István Maza (1982-1983)
- József Révi (1983-1984)
- László Nagyfi (1984-1990)
- Péter Kun (1990)
- Norbert Jung (1991-1994)
- László Láris (1998-2000)
- Dávid Nagy (2001–2010)

Bass

- Endre Paksi (1982-1983)
- György Pazdera (1983-1994)

Drums

- Dezső Nógrádi (1982-1983)
- András Gyenizse (1983-1985)
- László Tarca (1985-1994)
- Ede Szilágyi (1996-2006)
- Csaba Czébely (2006–2010)
- Márton Veress (2011–2014)

== Discography ==
=== Albums ===
- 1986: Totális Metál
- 1987: Pokoli színjáték
- 1989: Éjszakai bevetés
- 1990: Metál az ész
- 1990: Koncertlemez (live)
- 1991: Adj új erőt
- 1992: Vedd el, ami jár
- 1995: Az utolsó merénylet (live)
- 1996: A gép
- 2000: Csakazértis
- 2001: Ancient Fever (Csakazértis - English version)
- 2001: Live (live)
- 2002: Te sem vagy más
- 2002: Momentum (Végtelen úton) (re-recorded ballads)
- 2004: A túlélő
- 2006: Oblatio (re-recorded songs, acoustic)
- 2007: Pokoli mesék
- 2010: Újratöltve-Live

=== Compilations ===
- 1995: Best of "Régi Gép"

=== Singles ===
- 1983: Ki Mit Tud '83 (split single)
- 1984: Radio Recording Session '84
- 1985: A Sátán/A maszk (single)

=== Guesting ===
- 2002: Somewhere in Hungary (A Tribute to Iron Maiden) (Joe performing The Number of the Beast)
- 2005: BálnaVadÁszok (A Tribute to Moby Dick) (Joe performing a duet with Kalapács and Moby Dick)

=== Videos ===
- 1995: Az utolsó merénylet
