= Joe Rudán =

- Birth name: József Rudán
- Also known as: Joe
- Born: 5 June 1963 (age 61); Pécs, Baranya, Hungary
- Genres: Hard rock, Heavy metal, Speed metal
- Occupation(s): Singer, bass guitarist
- Years active: 1978–present

József "Joe" Rudán (born 5 June 1963 in Pécs) was the vocalist of the Hungarian heavy metal band Pokolgép from 1990 to 2010. He is also a bass guitarist, but now he doesn't play on bass guitar in any of his current bands.

== Bands ==
1978: Ewerest – bass, vocals
1979: HGM
1981–85: Morris
1983: Signal
1984: Spirál
1986: Jet
1987: Candy
1988: Alfa
1988–present: Coda – vocals
1989: Griff
1990–2010: Pokolgép – vocals
1997–2007: P. Mobil – vocals
2008–2013: Mobilmánia- vocals
2014–present: Dinamit – vocals
2015–present: Rudán Joe Band -vocals

== Discography ==
=== Pokolgép ===
- 1991 – Adj új erőt
- 1992 – Vedd el, ami jár
- 1995 – Az utolsó merénylet (on tracks "Győzd le a gonoszt" and "Mindhalálig rock 'n' roll")
- 1996 – A gép
- 2000 – Csakazértis
- 2001 – Ancient Fever
- 2001 – Live
- 2002 – Te sem vagy más
- 2002 – Momentum
- 2004 – A túlélő
- 2006 – Oblatio

=== P. Mobil ===
- 1998 – Kutyából szalonna
- 1999 – Színe-java

=== MobilMánia ===
- 2008 – Ez A Mánia
- 2010 – Az út legyen veled
