= Edda Művek =

Hungarian rock band

Edda Works (Művek)
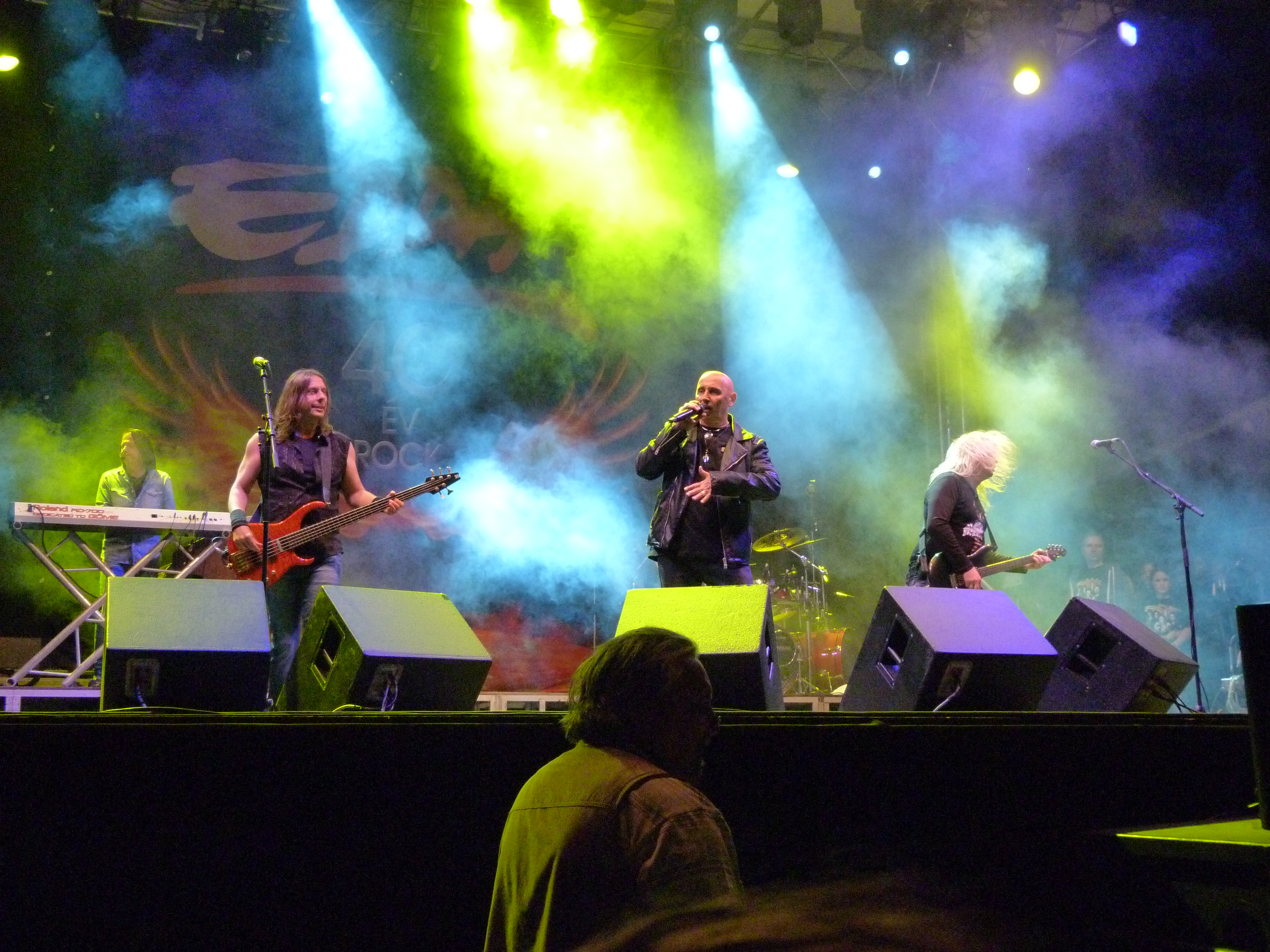
- Edda Művek - During a concert in 2015

Background information
- Origin: Miskolc, Hungary
- Genres: hard rock, blues rock, heavy metal
- Years active: 1973–1978, 1978–1983, 1985–present
- Label: Pataky Management
- Members: Attila Pataky; Zsolt Gömöry; István Alapi; László Kicska; Ákos Benkó; Gábor Pethö
- Past members: István Slamovits; Alfonz Barta; Péter Kun; László Zselenc; Tibor Donászy; Endre Csillag; Zoltán Hetényi; Mirkovics gábor
- Website: www.edda.hu

Edda Művek is a Hungarian rock band formed in 1973 initially under the name "Griff". Undergoing a brief name change to Edda, the band finally settled for Edda Művek shortly thereafter. The name "Edda" was inspired by the Prose Edda of Norse Mythology while the word, "Művek" (works), is a symbolic reference to the band originally starting its career in the industrial city of Miskolc, also dubbed as the "Steel City". According to frontman, Attila Pataky, "Művek" has also come to represent the band's "labor intensive" work ethic and prolific approach to songwriting, recording and touring.

Edda's catchy, melodic rock tunes and touching power ballads initially focused on social and emotional life of youth, love, anxiety and alienation. Themes later transitioned to issues dealing with sexuality, spirituality, cultural heritage, national identity, and in general, uncertainties and predicaments of contemporary Hungarian society amidst shifting political, social and economic landscapes. The band performs more than one hundred shows annually throughout Hungary and surrounding Hungarian communities in neighbouring countries. The energetic and inventive musicianship that EDDA are known for, is best reflected through live performances.

== Band history ==
=== Formation ===
The band was formed in 1973 in Miskolc by Jozsef Halász. Halász was attending university at the time the city organized a large-scale, local rock festival. Inspired by the event, Halász formed his own rock group, recruiting friends as musicians. Initially performing under the name Griff, the band months later switched to Edda (taken from the title of books of prose and poetry of Old Norse mythologies). With regular performances at the campus club of the University of Miskolc, Edda's popularity grew. To achieve a positive crowd response, the band's set lists also featured international pop hits.

Due to the pursuit of academic studies, members often left resulting in frequent lineup changes within the band; an ongoing trend that would continue throughout the 1980s and '90s resulting in high turnover rate in membership. Lead vocalist, Zoltán Zsiga was replaced with Attila Fodor who was eventually succeeded by current band leader, Attila Pataky. Pataky was the only member whose intent to pursue music as a full-time career, aimed to vigorously elevate the band to a professional level. Jozsef Halász decided to relocate to the city of Zalaegerszeg, granting the rights to the name "Edda" to Pataky. Halász's position on drums was temporarily filled by József Szepcsik who unexpectedly died from a severe illness in 1977 prompting Pataky to ask Halász to rejoin the group. Misfortune struck yet again as Halász, shortly after his return, was diagnosed with terminal cancer, eventually dying in 1980.

1977 arrived and with the intent to shape Edda Művek into a prominent rock band, Pataky recruited accomplished musicians from around Miskolc, including a new song-writing partner and lead guitarist, Istvan Slamovits. They decided to conquer the Hungarian music scene, a feat that was extremely difficult for any musical act originating outside of Budapest during the 1970s.

=== The classic Edda ===
The band's Budapest debut performance took place in 1979. The first show was a flop (with only 178 viewers), yet their popularity grew quickly across the country. The band recorded its first single (Minden Sarkon Álltam Már / Álom) in 1979, and the eponymous debut album: "Edda Művek 1." the following year. The release is currently a certified diamond disc in Hungary, with more than 500,000 units sold. Many of the songs on the landmark debut also became popular hits. The success continued as the band made an appearance in the movie "Ballagás", also featuring their own soundtrack. Edda Művek continued performing and composing new music, however tensions between members were escalating. Alfonz Barta left for Switzerland never to return and there were further replacements among musicians with bass guitarist and drummer positions changing. In 1983, continuing internal conflicts within the band, differences between Pataky and Slamovits led to the disbanding of Edda Művek. The group performed an emotionally charged farewell concert in Miskolc on December 17, 1983. The performance was recorded live and would ultimately become the band's fourth and final release.

=== Forming a new band ===
After a two-year hiatus, Pataky decided to revive Edda Művek. He left for Norway with László Fortuna (the only other band member from the original Edda lineup), Péter Csomós, and Endre Csillag in 1984. The band performed clubs in the evening, and wrote new material during the day. In 1985, Pataky and Fortuna returned to Hungary and restarted Edda Művek with hired musicians from Budapest. The comeback performance, highly anticipated by fans, turned out to be a success. Similarly to the band's final show, this comeback event was recorded and released as the band's 5th album, with a track list featuring entirely new material recorded live. After additional lineup changes through the years following, Edda finally formed a stable roster in 1988. Engaging in a vigorous touring schedule the band played numerous venues and some unusual places that included a steel factory and correctional facilities. In 1991, Péter Kun and László Kicska replaced István Alapi and Gábor Pethő who briefly left for Canada. After only a brief period with the band, Kun died in a motorcycle crash in 1993. The band held numerous memorial concerts for the guitarist. At the request of Pataky, István Alapi rejoined the band.

=== Nowadays ===
Another member change occurred in 1997 with Zoltán Hetényi replacing Tibor Donászy. In 1998 the band released their first English language album, "Fire and Rain". Presently, the band releases original studio material every three to four years, while maintaining a busy tour schedule. The band regularly holds concert events commemorating significant turning points of its career such as the release of their classic, self-titled debut album in 1980 which earned national recognition and breakthrough for Edda Művek, establishing the band as a professional musical outfit. The special anniversary events organized by the band every five years therefore, commemorate 1980 as the band's official start. Occasionally, past members of Edda's classic line-up (1980-1984 era) also make guest appearances and perform alongside the band, an indication of Pataky's reconciliation with old bandmates over the years.

In 2022 another member change occurred with Ákos Benkó replacing Zoltán Hetényi.

== Band members ==
=== Old Edda (1973–1978) ===
- Zoltán Zsiga (vocal) 1973
- István Darázs (vocal) 1973–1974
- Fodor Attila (vocal) 1974 (†2006)
- Attila Pataky (vocal) 1974-
- József Halász (drums) 1973-1977 (†1980)
- József Szepcsik (drums) 1977-1978 (†1978)
- Zoltán Ferenczi (guitar) 1973–1977
- Katalin Beély (bass guitar) 1973–1977
- Zoltán Fancsik (keyboards) 1974–1975

=== Classic Edda (1978–1983) ===
1978	Attila Pataky – vocal; István Slamovits – guitar, vocal; György Róna – bass guitar; Alfonz Barta – keyboards; György Csapó - drums
1978–1982	Attila Pataky – vocal; István Slamovits – guitar, vocal; László Zselencz – bass guitar; Alfonz Barta – keyboards; György Csapó - drums
1982–1983	Attila Pataky – vocal; István Slamovits – guitar, vocal; László Zselencz – bass guitar; György Róna - bass guitar (1982, temporarily); Alfonz Barta – keyboards; László Fortuna - drums; János Kegye - saxophone (guest star)
1983	Attila Pataky – vocal; István Slamovits – guitar, vocal; László Zselencz – bass guitar; László Fortuna - drums; Tamás Gally - keyboards (temporarily); János Kegye - saxophone (guest star)

=== New Edda (1984–) ===
1985	Attila Pataky – vocal; László Fortuna - drums; Tamás Mohai – guitar (temporarily); János Szénich – guitar (temporarily); Tibor Gellért (†2016) – guitar (temporarily); Endre Csillag – guitar; Gábor Mirkovics – bass guitar; Zsolt Gömöry – keyboards; Ferenc Béres - keyboards (temporarily)
1985–1988	Attila Pataky – vocal; Endre Csillag – guitar; Gábor Mirkovics – bass guitar; Zsolt Gömöry – keyboards; Bertalan Hirleman - drums (temporarily); Ferenc Raus - drums (temporarily); Tamás Papp - drums (temporarily); Tibor Donászy - drums
1988–1991	Attila Pataky – vocal; István Alapi – guitar; Gábor Pethő – bass guitar; Zsolt Gömöry – keyboards, vocal; Tibor Donászy - drums
1991–1993	Attila Pataky – vocal; Péter Kun – guitar (†1993); László Kicska – bass guitar; Zsolt Gömöry – keyboards, vocal; Tibor Donászy - drums
1993–1997	Attila Pataky – vocal; István Alapi – guitar; László Kicska – bass guitar; Zsolt Gömöry – keyboards, vocal; Tibor Donászy - drums
1997-2022	Attila Pataky – vocal; István Alapi – guitar; László Kicska – bass guitar; Zsolt Gömöry – keyboards vocal; Zoltán Hetényi - drums and percussion; 2022-present: Attila Pataky - vocal; István Alapi - guitar and vocals; Zsolt Gömöry - keyboard and vocals; László Kicska - bass guitar; Ákos Benkó - drums and percussion

In 1985, Pataky and Fortuna were the only core members of Edda Művek with the other musicians being hired personnel. Following the success of the band's reformation, Pataky decided on hiring professional, permanent members. For a brief period in 1987, Alapi and Csillag both performed together as guitarists. Shortly after Csillag decided to go to Austria.

== Discography ==
25 gold records, 4 platinum albums, 2 diamond records. More than 5 million units sold in Europe

Year	Album No.	Hungarian album title	English album title
1979	-	Minden Sarkon Álltam Már / Álom (single)	I Stood On Every Corner / Dream
1980	1	Edda Művek 1.	Edda Works 1.
1980	-	Ballagás (Kölyköd Voltam / Néma Völgy) (soundtrack single)	Valediction (I Was Your Kid / Silent Valley)
1981	2	Edda Művek 2.	Edda Works 2.
1981	-	MIDEM (promo single)	-
1982	-	1.2.3...Start (Micsoda Komédia/Vörös Tigris) (V/A live)	What A Comedy / Red Tiger
1983	3	Edda Művek 3.	Edda Works 3.
1984	4	Viszlát! (live)	Goodbye, Edda
1985	5	Edda Művek 5. (live)	Edda Works 5.
1986	-	Veled Vagyok / Gyere Őrült (single)	-
1986	6	Edda Művek 6.	Edda Works 6.
1987	-	Megmondtam / Fohász (single)	I Said / Supplication
1988	7	Változó Idők	Changing Times
1988	9	Pataky-Slamovits	-
1989	8	8.-Szaga Van!	It Stinks!
1990	10	10.-Győzni Fogunk!	We Will Win
1990	11	Best Of Edda '80-'90 (compilation)	-
1991	12	Szélvihar	Windstorm
1992	13	13	Edda Works 13. (Ghostworld)
1992	14	Az Edda Két Arca (compilation/live double album)	The Two Faces of Edda: Ballads, Concert
1993	15	Elveszett Illúziók	Lost Illusions
1993	16	Lelkünkből (live unplugged)	From Our Soul (Dedicated To Péter Kun)
1994	25	Karaoke (karaoke)	-
1994	17	Sziklaszív	Rockheart
1995	18	Edda Blues (compilation)	-
1995	-	Hazatérsz (single)	Coming Home
1995	19	15. Születésnap (live)	Edda's 15th Birthday
1996	-	Elvarázsolt Edda-Dalok (V/A Edda tribute compilation)	Charmed Edda Songs
1997	20	20.	-
1997	21	Lírák II. (compilation)	Ballads II.
1998	22	A Legjobbak...1988-1998 (compilation)	Best Of...1988-1998
1998	23	Fire And Rain (compilation)	-
1999	24	Nekem Nem Kell Más	I Don't Want Anyone Else
2000	-	A Magyar Rockzene Hőskora (V/A compilation)	Golden Age Of Hungarian Rock - Reader's Digest
2003	26	Örökség	Heritage
2005	27	Isten Az Úton	God On The Way
2005	28	Platina Sorozat (compilation)	Platinum Series (compilation)
2006	29	A Szerelem Hullámhosszán (compilation)	On The Frequency Of Love
2009	30	Átok És Áldás	Curses And Blessings
2012	31	Inog A Világ	World on Edge
2015	32	A Sólyom Népe	People of the Falcon
2015	34	Kölyköd Voltam (compilation)	I Was Your Kid
2018	33	Dalok a Testnek, Dalok a Léleknek	Songs For The Body, Songs For The Soul
2019	-	44 Év - Budapest, Papp László Sportaréna, 2018. március 10. (Live)	44 Years - Laszlo Papp Budapest Sports Area, March 10, 2018
2021	35	A Hírvivő	The Courier

Note: Initially, albums, Pataky-Slamovits, Karaoke and the compilation, Kölyköd Voltam, have not been categorized as official Edda Művek recordings at the time of their release. Eventually, these have been designated as albums #9, #25 and #34 retrospectively.

== Filmography ==
- One Day Rock - a documentary about a rock festival in 1981. Edda is one of the performers.
- Valediction - soundtrack and cameo appearance
- The Protegé - small appearance
- I Was Your Kid - documentary about the last days of the classic Edda
- Edda in Petőfi Hall, 1988 - VHS
- Unplugged
- Edda Camp - video about the 1994 concert in Agárd
- 15th Birthday - VHS
- 20th Birthday Concert, Small Stadium
- She won't forget, 'til she live - concert DVD

== Books about Edda ==
- Géza Riskó: Edda Művek, Miskolc (Ifjúsági Lap- és Könyvkiadó, 1984) ISBN 963-422-571-3
- Géza Riskó: Iron Rock (Közgazdasági és Jogi Könyvkiadó, 1987) ISBN 963-222-036-6
- Attila Pataky: Wine, sex, rock 'n roll... and soul (Pataky Menedzsment, 2007) ISBN 978-963-06-3463-2

== Links and sources ==
- http://www.edda.hu Official site
- http://shtoor.com/event.php?id=gb9yf68km1 Edda Művek
