= P. Box =

Hungarian rock band

- Origin: Budapest, Hungary
- Genres: Hard rock
- Years active: 1980–present
- Spinoff of: P. Mobil
- Members: Árpád Koroknai; József Sándor; Tibor Ferenczi; Tamás Bodó; Krisztián Szabó
- Website: pbox.hu

P. Box (which stands for Pandora's Box) is a Hungarian hard rock band formed by two ex-P. Mobil members, Sándor Bencsik and István Cserháti, in 1980. The group disbanded in 1986 due to Cserháti's settling in Debrecen, which is 220 km from the capital city Budapest. It was revived in 2001 by Cserháti, with the members of Szfinx and Aberra. On 21 August 2005, Cserháti died of cancer at the age of 51. In November 2005, the band officially changed their name to Pandora's Box. They broke up again in 2006, playing their last concerts on 3 November in Debrecen and 11 November in Budapest. They regrouped once more in the summer of 2009. Meanwhile, two former members, József Sáfár and István Szabó, formed a separate band with the same name.

== Band members ==
=== Vocals ===
- Miklós Varga 1980–1983, 1986
- Gyula Vikidál (ex-P. Mobil, ex-Dinamit) 1983–1986
- Árpád "Kori" Koroknai (ex-Szfinx) 2001–

=== Guitars ===
- Sándor "Samu" Bencsik (ex-P. Mobil) 1980–1986 (†1987)
- József "Günter" Sándor (ex-Szfinx) 2001–

=== Bass ===
- József "Öcsi" Sáfár (ex-V'73, ex-Volán) 1980–1984 (in 2009, he cofounded a separate band named P. Box with István Szabó)
- László "Zsöci" Zselencz (ex-Edda) 1985–1986
- Tibor "Cézi" Ferenczi (ex-Aberra) 2001–

=== Drums ===
- István Szabó 1980–1984 (in 2009, he cofounded a separate band named P. Box with József Sáfár)
- Zoltán Pálmai (ex-P. Mobil, ex-Hobo Blues Band) 1985–1986
- Tamás Bodó (ex-Aberra) 2001–

=== Keyboards ===
- István Cserháti (ex-P. Mobil) 1980–1986; 2001–2005 (†2005)
- Krisztián Szabó 2005– (live member, later full member)

== Discography ==
Studio albums

- P. Box (1982)
- Kő kövön (1983)
- Ómen (1985)
- Reményre ítélve (2002)
- Pangea (2005)

Live albums

- Vágtass velünk! (2003)

Compilations

- A zöld, a bíbor és a fekete (in memory of Sándor Bencsik, contains songs by P. Box, P. Mobil, and Bill és a Box Company) (1995)
- P. Box + Kő kövön (1999)

Singles

- "Halálkatlan/A bolond" (1981)
- "A zöld, a bíbor és a fekete /Valami rock and roll" (1982)
- "Újra nyitva" (2001)

Guest appearances

- Gyula Vikidál - Vikidál Gyula (band members performing as guests, one track performed by P. Box) (1985)
- Mondd, mit ér egy falat kenyér? (various artists, P. Box recorded the track "Tízből vajon mennyi") (1985)
