= Elemér Gombos =

Hungarian swimmer

Personal information
- Born: 18 April 1915 Jászapáti, Austria-Hungary
- Died: March 1989 (aged 73)

Sport
- Sport: Swimming

Elemér Gombos (18 April 1915 – March 1989) was a Hungarian swimmer. He competed in the men's 100 metre backstroke at the 1936 Summer Olympics.
