= Endre Paksi =

- Born: Endre Paksi; December 10, 1958 (age 67); Budapest, Hungary
- Genres: Hard rock, Heavy metal, Speed metal
- Occupations: Singer, bass guitarist
- Years active: 1975–present
- Formerly of: Pokolgép; Rockwell; Ossian; Wellington

Endre Paksi (born December 10, 1958) is a Hungarian heavy metal vocalist, and formerly bass guitarist. He is the key member of Ossian, which is among the leading bands of Hungarian heavy metal. He played bass guitar in Pokolgép, of which he was a member during 1982–83. He also played in a band called Rockwell between 1983 and 1985, and formed Ossian in 1985. After the split up of Ossian in 1994, he formed Wellington, which lasted until 1998. Since 1998, he is in Ossian again. He is known to be able to play guitars and bass, thus being the main songwriter of Ossian, having written at least 150 songs partially or wholly.
