= Zsolt Daczi =

- Born: June 12, 1969; Kiskunhalas, Hungarian People's Republic
- Died: August 6, 2007 (aged 38) Tahitótfalu, Hungary
- Genres: Rock; hard rock; heavy metal
- Instrument: Guitar
- Years active: 1985–2007
- Formerly of: Bikini, Tirana Rockers, Carpathia Project, Omen

Zsolt Daczi (June 12, 1969 – August 6, 2007) was a Hungarian guitarist. He was born in Kiskunhalas, Hungary.

He was a member of the Hungarian rock band Bikini and the heavy metal band Omen. He also founded a project (Carpathia Project), and he also played in a heavy metal band called Tirana Rockers.

Daczi struggled with cancer in his last years. In the end, he was unable to play on stage. He died in Budapest aged 38 years old.

== Bands ==
- 1989–1992: Bikini
- 1993–1999: Tirana Rockers
- 1997–2004: Bikini
- 1999: Carpathia Project
- 2002–2007: Omen
