= Ferenc Tibor Halmai =

Hungarian politician

Member of the National Assembly
- Incumbent
- Assumed office 9 May 2026
- Preceded by: János Pócs
- Constituency: Jász-Nagykun-Szolnok 2nd

Personal details
- Party: Tisza

Ferenc Tibor Halmai is a Hungarian politician who was elected member of the National Assembly in 2026 representing the Jász-Nagykun-Szolnok County 2nd constituency. He previously worked at the police.
