= Csaba Horváth =

Csaba Horváth may refer to:

- Csaba Horváth (canoeist) (born 1971), Hungarian sprint canoeist
- Csaba Horváth (chemical engineer) (1930–2004), Hungarian-American chemical engineer
- Csaba Horváth (footballer) (born 1982), Slovak football central defender
- Csaba Horváth (gymnast) (born 1984), Hungarian artistic gymnast
- Csaba Horváth (politician) (born 1969), Hungarian politician
- Csaba Horváth (chess player) (born 1968), Hungarian chess grandmaster
