= Csaba P. Kovesdy =

American nephrologist and epidemiologist

- Education: M.D., Pecs University Medical School, Pécs, Hungary (1995)
- Known for: Research in nephrology

Csaba P. Kovesdy is an American nephrologist and a professor of medicine–nephrology at the University of Tennessee Health Science Center as well as Chief of Nephrology at the Memphis Veterans Affairs Medical Center. He is also affiliated with Methodist Hospitals of Memphis and Le Bonheur Children's Hospital, also in Memphis.

Kovesdy received his M.D. degree from the Pecs University Medical School in Pécs, Hungary in 1995. He received additional medical training at Johns Hopkins University and at the Henry Ford Hospital of Wayne State University. Kovesdy is board certified in nephrology and internal medicine and he is licensed to practice in Tennessee and Virginia.

Kovesdy is an author of more than 160 articles regarding epidemiology and its outcomes. His contributions are studies of the association of secondary hyperparathyroidism with increased mortality, obesity survival paradox, protein-energy malnutrition in non-dialysis dependent chronic kidney disease (NDD-CKD) patients, and the systematic presentation of the concept of "burnt-out" diabetes mellitus. His other areas of research include cardiovascular risk factors, bone-mineral metabolism, metabolic abnormalities and race-ethnicity.
