= Bikini (Hungarian band) =

Hungarian rock band

- Origin: Budapest, Hungary
- Genres: Pop rock, new wave, punk rock, post-punk, hard rock, art punk
- Years active: 1982–present
- Labels: Start, Favorit, Gong, Quint, Hungaroton, EMI
- Members: Alajos Németh; Lajos D. Nagy; Viktor Mihalik; Dénes Makovics; Péter Lukács; Zoltán Gombkötő
- Past members: József Vedres; Gábor Németh; Feró Nagy; Antal Gábor Szűcs; Péter Gallai; Bertalan Hirleman; Zoltán Kató; Endre Berecz; Zsolt Daczi; Szabolcs Bördén; Endre Csillag

Bikini is a Hungarian rock band.

== Biography ==
=== The "Old Bikini” period ===
The band was formed in 1982 by singer Feró Nagy and guitarist József Vedres after the disband of Beatrice. Bassist Alajos Németh, his brother, drummer Gábor Németh and guitarist Gábor Szűcs Antal joined them and formed Bikini.

In the first years Bikini played punk music very similar to Beatrice. Frontman and songwriter Feró Nagy saw the band as a Beatrice-afterband, even covering some of their old songs. Most of their fans were the same as of Beatrice, going to concert not because of the band but because of the "Feró Nagy phenomenon". This formation released two albums "Hova lett..." in 1983 and "XX. századi híradó" in 1984 (without Gábor Szűcs Antal). Despite all similarities, Bikini and Rice were quite different, at least, seeing them retrospectively. The „Old” Bikini members decided to strengthen the funny, rebel, „idiotic” side of Beatrice and the new band played a much more alternative and extraordinary, dadaistic hard rock-like or new wave music with simple, nonsense lyrics, sometimes went into clear huey, assembled from interjection expressions, child poetry, (Otyi-Totyi Ping-pong, Ki csinál szódát?), blurred distopic visions about human mind control by engineering/education (Program), or parodistic dance music quotes (Nem leszek) .

=== The L. D. Nagy period ===
In 1985 Feró Nagy left the band (from 1999 the line-up with Feró Nagy sometimes has reunion-concerts as "Ős-Bikini" - "Old Bikini"). He was replaced by Lajos D. Nagy, along with keyboardist Péter Gallai. This caused a great change in Bikini's style and image. During the late 1980s the band became a professional and talented team mostly playing popular, „synths- and winds-backed” pop rock and hard rock music. Along with some lineup changes during the years (most notably Bertalan Hirlemann as drummer and Zsolt Daczi as guitarist) Bikini released several albums and made several successful tours. They finally achieved stardom in 1988 with the album "Ha volna még időm...".

Despite his left-out, Feró was in good relations with the band, and as lyricist, wrote some of their biggest hits (Ezt nem tudom másképp mondani, Mielőtt elmegyek, Fagyi, Megüssem vagy ne üssem, Nehéz a dolga a katonának).

The band continued to release successful albums in the early 1990s. In 1992 at the peak of their career, they disbanded. They were reunited in 1997 after a five year absence from the music world. Along with various lineup changes during the late 1990s, the band continued to release successful albums and tour extensively. Their album "Őrzöm a lángot" was released in 2007. In 2009, they released a best-of double album, with all of their greatest hits re-recorded with the current line-up. Their last album, "Elmúlt illúziók", was released in 2011.

== Members ==
- Lajos D. Nagy - vocals
- Péter Lukács - guitars, vocals
- Alajos Németh - bass, vocals
- Dénes Makovics - saxophone, flute
- Viktor Mihalik - drums
- Zoltán Gombkötő - keyboards

== Discography ==
- "Hova lett..." ("What Has Come Of...") (1983)
- "XX. századi híradó" ("20th Century News") (1984)
- "Ezt nem tudom másképp mondani" ("I Can't Say This Another Way") (1985)
- "Mondd el" ("Tell Me") (1987)
- "Ha volna még időm" ("If I Had Time") (1988)
- "Bikini" (compilation album) (1988)
- "Közeli helyeken" ("In Nearby Places") (1989)
- "Temesvári vasárnap" ("Sunday in Temesvár") (1990)
- "A sötétebbik oldal" ("The Darker Side") (1991)
- "Izzik a tavaszi délután" ("The Spring Afternoon is Glowing")(1992)
- "Búcsúkoncert" ("Farewell Concert") (live album) (1993)
- "Aranyalbum" ("Golden Album") (compilation album) (1996)
- "A szabadság rabszolgái" ("Slaves of Freedom") (1997)
- "Körutazás a Balkánon" ("Tour Around the Balkans") (live album) (1998)
- "A világ végén" ("At the End of the World") (1999)
- "Gyémánt" ("Diamond") (compilation album) (2000)
- "Nem lesz ennek jó vége" ("It Won't End Happily") (2000)
- "Álomból ébredve" ("Waking Up from a Dream") (2002)
- "Angyali üdvözlet" ("Annunciation") (2004)
- "Őrzöm a lángot" ("I Guard the Flame") (2007)
- "Best of Bikini" (compilation album) (2009)
- "Elmúlt illúziók" ("Passed Illusions") (2011)
