= Imre Szekeres =

Hungarian politician

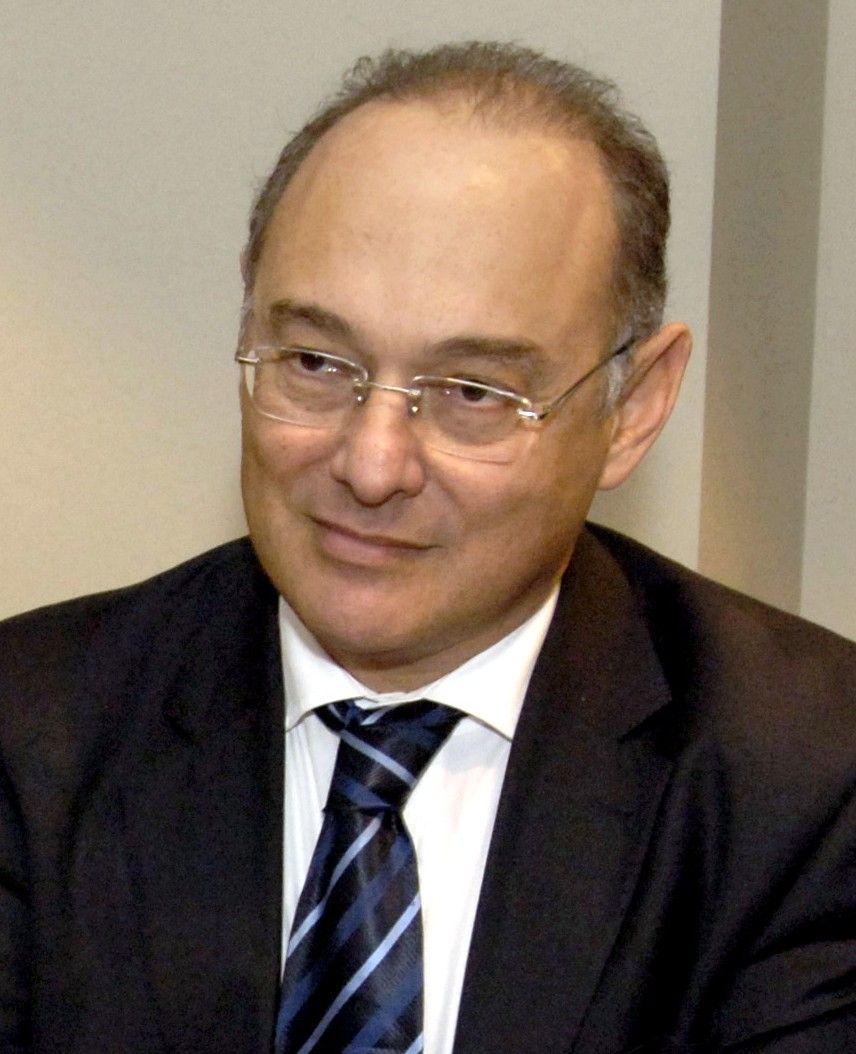

Minister of Defence of Hungary
- In office 9 June 2006 – 29 May 2010
- Prime Minister: Ferenc Gyurcsány; Gordon Bajnai
- Preceded by: Ferenc Juhász
- Succeeded by: Csaba Hende

Personal details
- Born: 9 September 1950 (age 75) Szolnok, Hungary
- Party: MSZMP, MSZP
- Spouse: Katalin Vásárhelyi
- Children: András Márk; Hanna Flóra
- Profession: politician

Imre Szekeres (born 9 September 1950) is a Hungarian politician of the Hungarian Socialist Party (MSZP) and former Minister of Defense.

== Biography ==
Szekeres was born in Szolnok. He is married to a chemical engineer; they have two children.

He graduated from the Veszprém University of Chemical Engineering as a chemical systems engineer in 1974. After graduation he spent three years at the Cybernetics Institute of the University as an assistant lecturer while studying for a PhD degree. The subject of his 1977 PhD dissertation was the development of artificial intelligence.

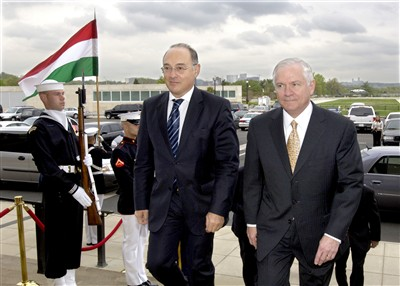
Szekeres with Robert Gates.

In 1985, he joined to the City Council of Veszprém, where he later became the deputy chairman. He was one of the first promoters and organizers of the reformist circle movement in Veszprém county. He was a founding member of the MSZP in October 1989, and in his county he became the first president of the party. In May 1990 he was elected as the national secretary of the party, and he was elected executive vice-president in November. He was the party's vice-president between 1994 and 1998. He was the campaign chief of his party during the 1994 and 1998 general elections. He was a member of the party's national presidency between 1998 and 2003. Then he was re-elected in 2003 as the vice-president of MSZP. He is the deputy president of the party, since 2004 (re-elected: 2007), also associate president of the Economic Section and head of the Economic Policy Cabinet since 2002. Since 2010 he has not undertaken to membership in the party's national presidency. Now he is the head of the Economic Policy Cabinet and president of the Board of the József Attila Foundation.

He was voted into the Parliament from individual constituency No. 2. (Jászapáti) of Jász-Nagykun-Szolnok County in 1994, 1998 and 2006. He obtained his mandate on the county's party list in April 2002. He was the leader of the group of MSZP Members of the Parliament between 28 June 1994 and 17 June 1998. He was the Chairman of the Economic Committee, the Budget and Finance Committee and the EU Integration Subcommittee of the Parliament between 1998 and 2002. He was the Political State Secretary with general authority in the Prime Minister's Office from 2002 till 2004. He was appointed on 9 June 2006 as the Minister of Defence.

Szekeres was conferred on the Freeman of Jászapáti, he is a member of the Jász Association ("The people of Jászság Association") and other social organizations of Jászság (a geographical region of Hungary). He was elected in 2003 as the chairman of the Hungarian Triathlon Association, and was re-elected in 2005.

== Political career ==
=== Government posts ===
- Minister of Defence (June 2006 – May 2010)
- Political State Secretary with general authority – Prime Minister's Office (May 2002 – October 2004)

=== Hungarian Socialist Party (MSZP) ===
- Deputy president (October 2004 – February 2007; February 2007 – )
- Chairman of Economic Section – (2002 – 2007, 2007– )
- Vice-president (March 2003 – October 2004)
- Member of the party's national presidency (September 1998 – March 2003)
- Vice-president (October 1994 – September 1998)
- Campaign chief (1994, 1998)
- Executive deputy president (November 1990 – May 1992; May 1992 – October 1994)
- National secretary (May 1990 – November 1990)
- County president of Veszprém County (October 1989– )

=== Parliament ===
- 2010: county party list of Jász-Nagykun-Szolnok County
- 2006: individual constituency (Jászapáti)
- 2002: county party list of Jász-Nagykun-Szolnok County
- 1998: individual constituency (Jászapáti)
- 1994: individual constituency (Jászapáti)
- Economic Committee of the Parliament – Chairman (April 2002 – May 2002)
- Budget and Finance Committee of the Parliament – Chairman (June 1998 – May 2002)
- EU Integration Subcommittee of the Parliament – Chairman (October 1998 – May 2002)
- Leader of MSZP Members of Parliament Group (October 1994 – June 1998)

== Controversies ==
He gave a speech before the officer corps of the Hungarian Army in honor of receipt of Gripen fighters on 28 January 2008.

== Sources ==
- www.szekeresimre.hu (Official Site)

National Assembly of Hungary
Preceded by Zoltán Gál	Leader of the MSZP parliamentary group 1994–1998	Succeeded by László Kovács
Political offices
Preceded by Elemér Kiss	Minister of Prime Minister's Office; Acting; 2003	Succeeded by Péter Kiss
Preceded by Ferenc Juhász	Minister of Defence; 2006–2010	Succeeded by Csaba Hende
