= Csaba Siklós =

Hungarian politician (1941–2026)

Minister of Transport, Communications and Water Affairs
- In office 23 May 1990 – 22 February 1993
- Prime Minister: József Antall
- Preceded by: András Derzsi
- Succeeded by: György Schamschula

Member of the National Assembly of Hungary for Individual Constituency Budapest No. 3
- In office 2 May 1990 – 27 June 1994

Personal details
- Born: 29 August 1941 Budapest, Hungary
- Died: 16 March 2026 (aged 84)
- Party: MDF
- Education: Budapest University of Technology and Economics
- Occupation: Engineer

Csaba Siklós (29 August 1941 – 16 March 2026) was a Hungarian politician. A member of the Hungarian Democratic Forum, he served as Minister of Transport, Communications and Water Affairs and was a member of the National Assembly from 1990 to 1994.

Siklós died on 16 March 2026, at the age of 84.
