= Csaba Hende =

Hungarian politician (born 1960)

Csaba Hende MP
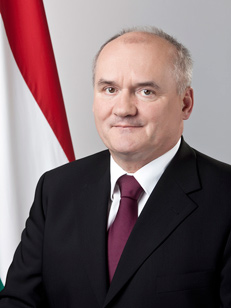
- Hende in 2011

Deputy Speaker of the National Assembly for Legislation
- In office 2 October 2017 – 31 May 2025
- Preceded by: Gergely Gulyás
- Succeeded by: Sándor Fazekas

Minister of Defence
- In office 29 May 2010 – 9 September 2015
- Prime Minister: Viktor Orbán
- Preceded by: Imre Szekeres
- Succeeded by: István Simicskó

Member of the National Assembly
- In office 15 May 2002 – 31 May 2025

Personal details
- Born: 5 February 1960 (age 66) Szombathely, Hungary
- Party: MDF (1988–2004); Fidesz (2004–present)
- Spouses: Szilvia Stiber (m. 1984; div. 2013) Mónika Szajlai (m. 2018)
- Children: 2
- Education: Eötvös Loránd University
- Profession: Politician

Csaba Hende (born 5 February 1960) is a Hungarian politician who served as Minister of Defence of Hungary from 29 May 2010 to 9 September 2015 when he resigned.

Hende was born in Szombathely in 1960. In 1983 he graduated in law at the Eötvös Loránd University in Budapest, then practiced as a lawyer in his hometown of Szombathely. Beginning in 1988, he was a member of Hungarian Democratic Forum (MDF). In 1991 he joined the government as parliamentary secretary of state of the Defence Ministry. During the rule of socialist-liberal cabinet (1994–1998) he returned to practice law in Szombathely. In the first government of Viktor Orbán he served as Secretary of State in the Ministry of Justice. At the beginning of the 21st century, he held high functions in the MDF party (including Vice-President), but in 2004 he joined Fidesz. In 2006 and 2010 he was re-elected to the National Assembly on behalf of Fidesz in Vas County (1st constituency). Hende was appointed Minister of Defence in 2010.

His first measure as minister was the replacement of the Chief of General Staff of the Armed Forces general (OF-9) László Tömböl and more high-rank military officers. The Hungarian Socialist Party criticized the decision as incomprehensible. Hende justified his step with the fact that many tax evasions and maladministration happened in the army under the previous government. He said that he would restore the honour and prestige of the Hungarian Defence Forces.

On 7 September 2015, Hende resigned his post after the armed forces, which he oversaw as minister, were building the Hungarian border barrier (to keep migrants and refugees out of Hungary) too slowly. He was replaced by István Simicskó on 10 September.

On 2 October 2017, Hende was appointed Chairman of the Legislative Committee in the Hungarian Parliament, and thus also became Deputy Speaker for Legislation. He served in this capacity until May 2025, when he was elected a member of the Constitutional Court of Hungary, thus he resigned from his parliamentary seat.

== Personal life ==
He is married. His first wife was Szilvia Stiber. They had two daughters together. His second wife is Mónika Szajlai.

Political offices
Preceded by Imre Szekeres	Minister of Defence; 2010–2015	Succeeded by István Simicskó
National Assembly of Hungary
Preceded by Gergely Gulyás	Deputy Speaker for Legislation; 2017–2025	Succeeded by Sándor Fazekas
