= István Cserháti =

- Also known as: Pityi
- Born: István Cserháti; 29 August 1954
- Died: 21 August 2005 (aged 50)
- Genres: Hard rock, Heavy metal
- Occupations: Keyboardist, Songwriter
- Years active: 1973–2005
- Formerly of: P. Box; P. Mobil

István Cserháti (29 August 1954 – 21 August 2005) was a Hungarian hard rock keyboardist who played for two bands: P. Mobil (1977–1980) and P. Box (1980–1986; 2001–2005).

In 1977, he was discovered by the P. Mobil members on a Napsugár-concert and was brought to play in the band. In 1978 they recorded a live album which should have been the first P. Mobil release, but it was released only in the spring of 1999. In 1980 he departed with Sándor Bencsik and formed P. Box (after a Procol Harum song). He settled in Debrecen (220 km from the capital) in 1986, and the distance caused him to disband P. Box. The other members of the band continued for a short while as Metal Company, then they united with Gyula Deák "Bill", so their name became "Bill és Box". Sándor Bencsik left Hungary in 1987, but died suddenly in Austria.

Cserháti started a studio in his home, where he discovered the band "Szfinx", becoming its manager.

In 1999 the first two full-length albums were re-released on CD, remastered.

In 2001 he revived P. Box, with two Szfinx and two Aberra members. They released a returning single, and a year after a new album came out. In 2003 they released the first ever official concert album of P. Box. In 2005, they started to record the new album Pangea.

At this time, doctors found out Cserháti was ill with cancer. Despite this, they continued the recordings, and Pangea came out in July. He died in mid-August 2005.

== Bands ==
- 197?-1977: Napsugár
- 1977-1980: P. Mobil
- 1980-1986: P. Box
- 2001-2005: P. Box

== Discography ==
- P. Box: Halálkatlan/A bolond (1981)
- P. Box: P. Box (1982)
- P. Box: Kő kövön (1983)
- Gyula Vikidál: Vikidál Gyula (1985)
- P. Box: Ómen (1985)
- P. Mobil: Az "első" nagylemez '78 (1999)
- P. Box: P. Box + Kő kövön (1999)
- P. Box: Újra nyitva (2001)
- P. Box: Reményre ítélve (2002)
- P. Box: Vágtass velünk! (2003)
- P. Box: Pangea (2005)
