= Gyula Vikidál =

Hungarian singer (born 1948)

Gyula Vikidál (born 25 January 1948) is a Hungarian singer. He started his career early as a rock vocalist in groups like Iris, Pannonia, Gesarol, Pop, Rekorder and Gemler. When he joined the P. Mobil heavy rock group, it was an underground group but soon acquired a broad fan base.

In 1979–81 he was a member of the Hungarian Dinamit. After that some of his former band members in P Mobil, Istvan Cserháti (d. 2004) and András Bencsik (d. 1987) tempted him into P Box. He was in this group between 1983 and 1986.

In 1983 he made his final breakthrough with a wider population, with the dual leading role as the rebel-leader and pagan Koppány in the rock musical of King Stephen (István A Király). This has been set up in the 90s and in 2003. This role has become some kind of symbol for Hungarian resistance against imperialist powers like former Turkish or Ottoman Empire and the Soviet Union despite it is clearly meant as an apology for Kádár János being a Quisling for the Soviet Union.

During the 1980s-90s and to some extent the 2000s he has been a rock opera and, even more, musical theatre singer with leading parts in Jesus Christ Superstar, Aida, and Les Misérables amongst others. He continued to sing rock, but in smaller contexts, in MHV and Boxer.

Vikidál's image is a communist, the phrasing is colored by attack and the fact that he is a weight lifter and very athletic. His favorite spare time activity is sport fishing.

After a scandal in 2004, when he was found out to have been drafted as a state informant, his name has been more controversial. In 2008 he toured with a new band MobilMania, whose members include Péter Tunyogi and László Kékesi, Joe Rudán and András Zeffer.

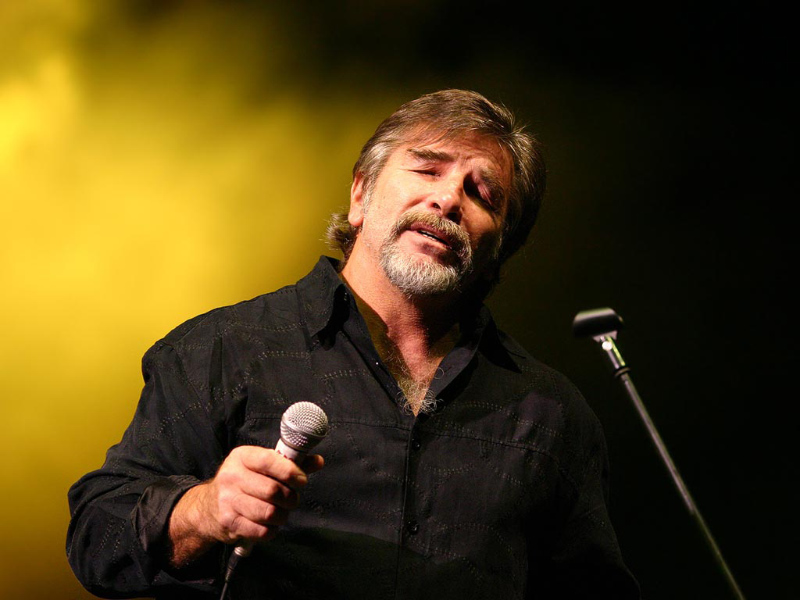
Gyula Vikidál, is a Hungarian singer.
