= Csaba László =

Csaba László may refer to:

- Csaba László (footballer, born 1964), Romanian-born Hungarian football player and manager currently manager for Chennaiyin FC
- Csaba László (footballer, born 1967), Hungarian football player
- Csaba László (politician) (born 1962), Hungarian politician, minister of finance, 2002–2004
