= János Pócs =

Hungarian politician

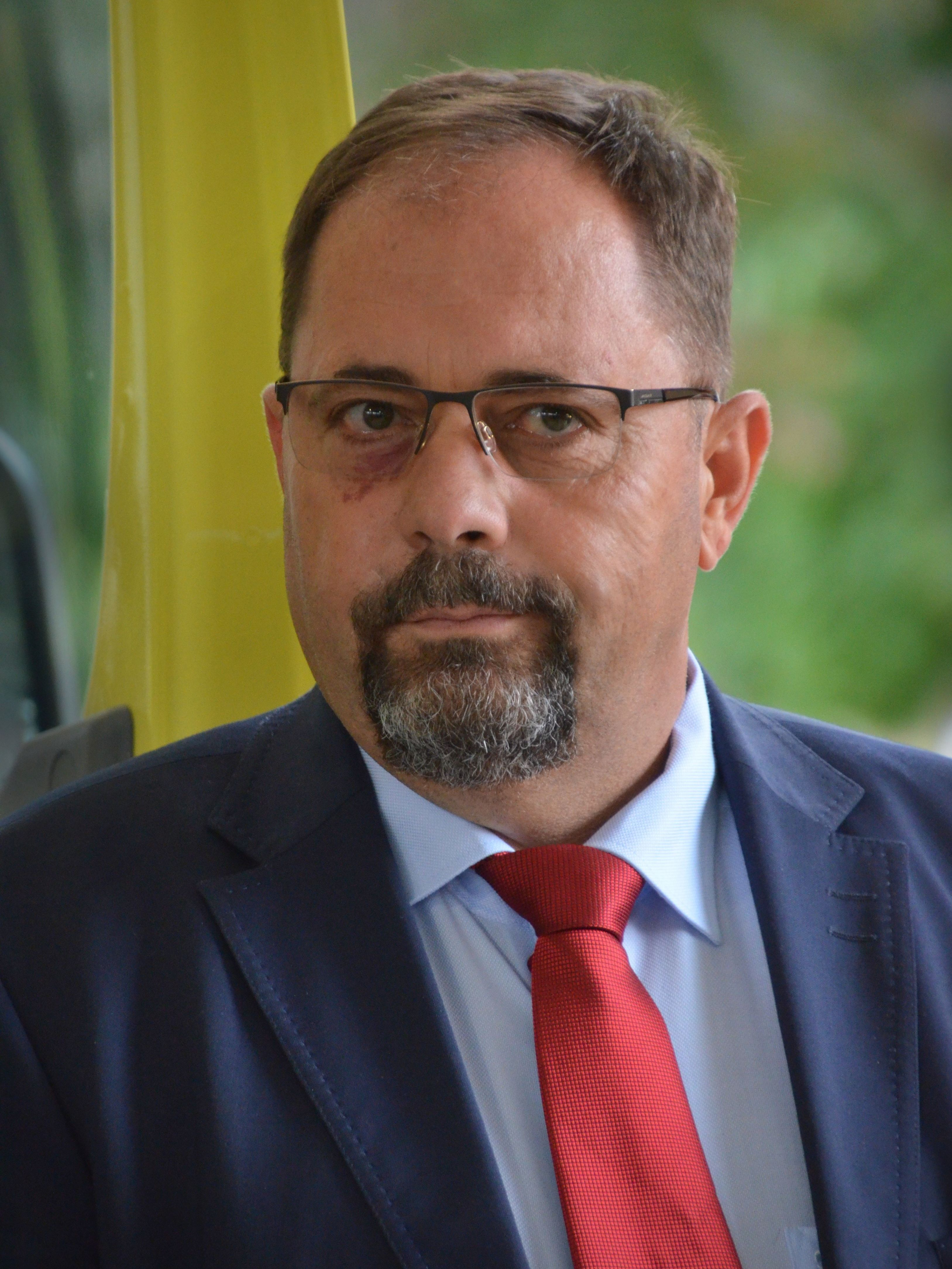
- János Pócs in 2017

Member of the National Assembly
- Incumbent
- Assumed office 14 May 2010
- Constituency: 2nd of Jász-Nagykun-Szolnok

Personal details
- Born: 17 November 1963 (age 62) Jászapáti, Hungary
- Party: Fidesz
- Profession: politician

János Pócs (born 17 November 1963) is a Hungarian politician, member of the National Assembly (MP) since 2010. In this capacity, he represented Jászapáti (Jász-Nagykun-Szolnok County Constituency II) from 2010 to 2014, and Jászberény (Jász-Nagykun-Szolnok County Constituency II) from 2014 to 2026.

He was elected member of the Committee on Agriculture on 14 May 2010 (he chaired its various sub-committees during that time). He served as the mayor of Jászapáti between October 2010 and 2014. He functioned as one of the recorders of the National Assembly from 6 May to 2 June 2014.

He made international news in December 2017 when he posted a photo on his Facebook page showing people standing over a slain and charred pig, with "Ő VOLT A SOROS!!!" inscribed on the animal. The inscription can be translated as "He was next in line" or "He was Soros." He commented on the photo the following: "One pig less over there." He denied that the inscription had anything to do with George Soros. The Open Society Foundations described the photo as a "shocking attack" and "another example of officially accepted anti-Semitism in Viktor Orbán's Hungary." The Hungarian government has previously launched a political campaign against the Hungarian-American businessman.

Pócs was defeated by Tisza candidate Ferenc Tibor Halmai in Jászberény constituency during the 2026 Hungarian parliamentary election. Nevertheless, he was selected as MP via the national list of Fidesz–KDNP by the party presidium. He became a member of the Committee on Agriculture and Food Economics.
