= Csaba Pintér =

Hungarian bass player

- Also known as: Pinyő
- Born: Csaba Pintér; January 11, 1967 (age 59); Budapest, Hungary
- Genres: Hard rock, Heavy metal, Speed metal, Punk
- Occupation: Bass guitarist
- Years active: 1983 – present
- Member of: Pokolgép

Csaba Pintér (born January 11, 1967) is the bass player of Hungarian heavy metal band Pokolgép since 1996.
