= P. Mobil =

Hungarian band

- Genres: hard rock, blues rock
- Years active: 1973–1986, 1994–
- Labels: Hungaroton; GrundRecords
- Members: Lóránt Schuster; Vilmos Sárvári; László Baranyi; Dániel Tarnai; Péter Szabó; Ákos Fekecs
- Past members: Sándor Bencsik; István Cserháti; Gyula Vikidál; András Zeffer; Péter Tunyogi; László Kékesi; István Mareczky; Egon Póka; Joe Rudán
- Website: pmobil.hu

P. Mobil is a Hungarian rock band. Initially founded as Gesarol in 1969, they had to change their name in May 1973. The band had its most successful era in the 1970s and the 1980s, when they were one of the most popular bands in Hungary.

The line-up has frequently changed around band leader and manager Lóránt Schuster. There are eras in the band's history which can easily be distinguished by the change of lead singer.

== History ==
=== Foundation as Gesarol ===
Lóránt Schuster joined the group Hausbyrds in 1968. This band is founded in Sashalom, Budapest, inspired by The Yardbirds. The band had no proper equipment so they had to make their instruments and speakers by themselves. Schuster, who cannot play any instruments, acted as a manager and lyrics writer. After the dissolution of Hausbyrds, he reorganized it, this time as Gesarol, in 1969. Gesarol was the name of a popular insecticide (DDT), and they called themselves as "musicians of insect death". Their lead singer was László Losó, András Póta was at the drums and Sándor Cziránku played the lead guitar. However, the director of Hungarian Event Organizing Agency (ORI) forbade them using the name Gesarol. At that time, the band has already gained a fan base.

=== Continuing and struggling as P. Mobil ===
In April 1973 an ad appeared on the newspaper Esti Hírlap, informing everyone that from May the band Gesarol will change its name to P. Mobil. Schuster and the other band members chose the name randomly from a dictionary, which is a derivation of "perpetuum mobile", the perpetual motion machine. Their debut was in Miskolc in June 1973, at the first ever pop-rock festival of Hungary. At that time Sándor Bencsik played the guitar, and soon other new members arrived: István Cserháti on the keyboards, and Gyula Vikidál as the lead singer. The lyrics of Schuster, the music themes of Bencsik, and the strong, distinctive voice of Vikidál gave the band a massive fan following in the next years. Although they have written many songs and they were very popular, Péter Erdős, the director of Hungarian Vinyl Manufacture (MHV), gave a strong dislike against the band, for no apparent reason. For this, P. Mobil had only three single vinyl releases, despite the fact that in 1978 a record has made in one of the Budapest gigs and it could have been released as a live album.

The futile attempts to get an album release resulted changes in the lineup. By the late 1970s the hard rock genre became even more popular in Hungary, and P. Mobil was categorized with Beatrice and Hobo Blues Band altogether as Black Sheep (Fekete Bárányok): bands that were repressed, sometimes persecuted. The band, however, persisted. In the late 1970s they wrote a suite about the Hungarian conquest in the 890s, called Honfoglalás, which was the first musical production that covered the foundation of Hungary, released a few years earlier than István, a király. In 1979 Gyula Vikidál left the band, and a new singer, Péter Tunyogi arrived.

=== First album releases and hiatus ===
In 1980 Péter Erdős convinced some of the band members that if they sack Schuster, they may have granted a record permission. They did it, and founded a new band Kentaur without him, but it was a very short lived attempt. Schuster was eventually reinstated as the band leader, but Bencsik and Cserháti left to found a new band called Pandora's Box (P. Box). They have replaced by guitarist Vilmos Sárvári and keyboardist András Zeffer. István "Totó" Mareczky have arrived at the drums, and the lineup solidified for the next few years. Soon P. Mobil got the chance to record their first album, Mobilizmo, in 1980. It was a moderate success, as they could have sell a lot more from that, but MHV chose not to manufacture a second batch of the vinyl. In 1981 the second album Heavy Medál released, which contained songs almost entirely written by the new lineup. In 1983 a third album was released, called Honfoglalás. It contained the Honfoglalás suite and new recordings of popular but never released P. Mobil songs. In the same year they organized the Hungarian Wall (Magyar Fal) concert. In 1984 and 1985 they had many famous (sometimes notorious) gigs: the so-called Electric Funeral (farewell party of the Buda Youth Park), a concert at the Peace Festival in Pusztavacs (in which, contrary the popular belief, the band did not have any responsibility for the clash of the police forces and the concert attendees), and a tour across Hungary on the board of a ship in the Duna river. In 1983, Mareczky suddenly defected to Australia, left a band without a drummer. His successor was Tibor Donászy.

Although they have worked on new material, personal disputes and financial problems lead Schuster to declare the suspension of the band.

=== Return of the band and further lineup changes ===
In 1993 there were talks between the former members about a reunion. Schuster reinvited the 1983 lineup, except András Zeffer - eventually he was rehired. Even Mareczky have returned to Hungary. The band quickly started to write new songs: a new album, called Ez az élet, Babolcsai néni was released in 1994. Furthermore, they organized a comeback concert in June 1994 at the Stadion Albert Flórián, which they have recorded and released in VHS and two CDs. Shortly after that concert, Mareczky returned to Australia, forcing the band finding a drummer again. In 1995 they were performed at the Sándor Bencsik Memorial Concert, and in 1996 they recorded Honfoglalás again, but this time they featured a symphonic orchestra version too.

Financial debates and alcohol problems led Schuster to sack singer Péter Tunyogi, keyboardist András Zeffer and bass guitarist László Kékesi. Following the departure of Zeffer, P. Mobil changed its style into a more guitar-oriented sound and hired no new keyboardist for years. Egon Póka bass guitarist arrived along with singer Joe Rudán and drummer Gábor Németh. This lineup released a new album in 1998, called Kutyából szalonna - originally meant to be as a movie soundtrack album. In 1999 a compilation album was released with new recordings (Színe-java), in order to further solidify the new style. Former band member Gyula Vikidál also sang on this album. In 2001, with the arrival of guitarist Ferenc Tornóczky Jr., P. Mobil became a two-guitarist band.

Although the lineup stabilized, no new material released, the band only toured. In 2007 they announced the reunion of the lineup fron the 1980s for just a tour - it ended abruptly, however, when singer Péter Tunyogi's health rapidly declined. In the meantime, former P. Mobil members founded a new band called Mobilmánia. In 2008 Joe Rudán left the band, and a new singer, László Baranyi arrived. Tensions rose between Schuster and Póka when the latter tried to get control of the band by introducing new musicians who were his students. Póka's habit and alcohol problems led to the point that after a new album (Mobileum) was released in 2009, Schuster did not attend on his own band's gigs. In September 2009, Póka and his students left the band, and Schuster gathered a group of young talented musicians: bass guitarist Dániel Tarnai, drummer Zsolt Szebelédi, and after he decided that P. Mobil will return to the keyboard-oriented sound, he did not seek a new guitarist after Tornóczky, but he hired veteran keyboardist Gyula Papp, and later Péter Szabó for his place.

=== Solidified lineup, Schuster's health and further projects ===
The new lineup chose to release a live concert album in order to introduce themselves. That was the 2012 double album Miskolci kocsonya, with a further third bonus album available on the band's website. A brand new album, Farkasok völgye, Kárpát-medence was released in 2014 which gathered decent success. In 2014 Schuster was diagnosed with liver cancer - he underwent a risky surgery and while he recovered, he did not attend on any gigs. Meanwhile, the band continued to release materlais from the earlier decades: remastered demo songs and concert recordings were released from different eras. The first triple CD, Vikidál-évek was released in 2015, the other three, Tunyogi-évek, Rudán-évek and Baranyi-évek in 2016. In 2017 an EP (Csoda történt) released with new songs, and in 2018 a 3-track single (Veletek). This release contained Nélküled, a hard rock cover of the song of Hungarian rock band Ismerős Arcok, which got massive popularity. The track and many other cover songs were released in 2019 too on an album (És?).

The band also organized big concerts too. In 2016 there was a gig in Budapest Park, called Honfoglalás határok nélkül, with many guests. The material was later released on DVD and on streaming. A similar concert was in April 2023 at the 50th birthday of P. Mobil, simply called P. Mobil 50. In 2025 they released an English-only album, called Do You Speak P. Mobil?

== Band members ==
=== Current members ===
- Lóránt Schuster (band leader, manager, vocal) (1968/1973–)
- László Baranyi (vocal) (2008–)
- Vilmos Sárvári (guitar) (1980–)
- Dániel Tarnai (bass guitar) (2009–)
- Péter Szabó (keyboards) (2013–)
- Ákos Fekecs (drums) (2026–)

=== Notable former members ===
- Gyula Vikidál (vocal) (1974–1979)
- Péter Tunyogi (vocals) (1979–1996)
- Joe Rudán (vocals) (1996–2008)
- Sándor Bencsik (guitar) (1973–1980)
- Ferenc Tornóczky Jr. (guitar) (1999/2001–2009)
- László Kékesi (bass guitar) (1974–1996)
- Egon Póka (bass guitar) (1996–2009)
- István Cserháti (keyboards) (1977–1980)
- András Zeffer (keyboards) (1980–1996)
- Zoltán Pálmai (drums) (1974–1978, 2020–2022)
- István Mareczky (drums) (1978–1983, 1994)
- Tibor Donászy (drums) (1983–1985)
- Gábor Németh (drums) (2001–2009, 2025)

== Discography ==
=== Studio albums ===
- Mobilizmo (1980)
- Heavy Medál (1981)
- Honfoglalás (1983)
- Ez az élet, Babolcsai néni (1994)
- Kutyából szalonna (1998)
- Mobileum (2009)
- Farkasok völgye, Kárpát-medence (2014)
- Csoda történt (2017)
- Do You Speak P. Mobil? (2025)

=== Singles ===
- Kétforintos dal / Menj tovább (1978)
- Forma I. / Utolsó cigaretta (1979)
- Miskolc / Csizma az asztalon (1980)
- Fegyvert veszek (2009)
- Gyöngyök és disznók (2009)
- Veletek (2018)
- Oly távol, messze van hazéám (2019)
- Kell a pénz a lóvéra (2021)
- Nagyon nagy a baj (2021)
- Lullaby (2024)
- Walk Into The Sun (2024)
- Whisky By The Lord (2025)

=== Live albums ===
- The Worst of P. Mobil (1994)
- The Rest of P. Mobil (1995)
- Az első nagylemez -1978- (1998)
- Miskolci kocsonya (2012)
- Honfoglalás határok nélkül (2020)
- P. Mobil 50 (2023)

=== Compilations ===
- Stage Power (1993)
- Színe-java (1999)

=== Other ===
- Honfoglalás – Symphonic Version (1996)
- Honfoglalás – Rock Version (1996)
- Vikidál-évek (2015)
- Tunyogi-évek (2016)
- Rudán-évek (2016)
- Baranyi-évek (2016)
- És? (2019)
