= Csaba Fazekas =

Hungarian director

Csaba Fazekas (born 1973) is a Hungarian director and writer of films and television shows.

Fazekas was born in 1973 in Tapolca. He studied law at University of Miskolc. He then studied at the Academy of Drama and Film, Faculty of Television- and Filmdirecting from 1995 to 2000, including under Sándor Simó.

His film feature debut Happy Birthday received a Best First Film Prize and Audience Award at Hungarian Film Week in 2003.

== Filmography ==
- The Player, A spíler (1996)
- Petto, Gunilla and Others, Petto, Gunilla és a többiek (1997)
- Dabadabadoo / Sabadabada (1999)
- Happy Birthday, Boldog születésnapot!, (2003)
- Swing (2014) starring Mari Torocsik

== See also ==
- Cinema of Hungary
