= Agárd =

Village in Hungary

Coordinates: 47°11′N 18°37′E

Agárd is a small village on the shores of Lake Velence in Hungary, administratively belongs to the municipality (town) of Gárdony. It is a popular tourist destination amongst Hungarians.

The village was initially named Agar, shows a record from 1193. This name comes from the word agár which means 'sighthound'. Later, the village's name evolved to Agárd which is a personal name from the fore-mentioned word.

== Information ==
https://www.telepules.com/en/gardony/tourism.html ?
