= Jászapáti =

- Town
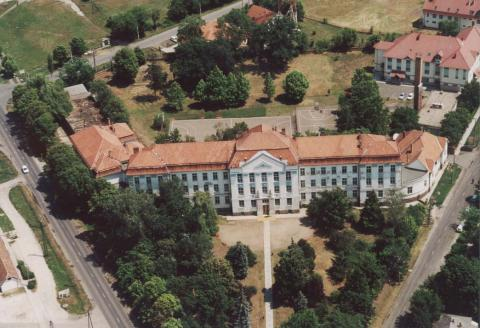
- Gróf Széchenyi István Catholic Secondary School

- Flag Coat of arms

- Location of Jászapáti
- Coordinates: 47°30′45″N 20°08′30″E
- Country: Hungary
- County: Jász-Nagykun-Szolnok
- District: Jászapáti

Area
  - Total: 78.16 km^{2} (30.18 sq mi)

Population (2018)
  - Total: 8,313
  - Density: 109.9/km^{2} (285/sq mi)
- Time zone: UTC+1 (CET)
  - Summer (DST): UTC+2 (CEST)
- Postal code: 5130
- Area code: (+36) 57
- Website: www.jaszapati.hu

Jászapáti is a town in Jász-Nagykun-Szolnok county, in the Northern Great Plain region of central Hungary.

== Geography ==
It covers an area of 78.16 km^{2} (30 sq mi) and had a population of 8585 people in 2014.

== Politics ==
The current mayor of Jászapáti from 1 October 2024 is Gergő Illés (independent).

The local Municipal Assembly, elected at the 2024 local government elections, is made up of 9 members (1 Mayor and 8 Individual list MEPs) divided into the following political parties and alliances:

Party	Seats	Current Municipal Assembly
Fidesz-KDNP	5	
Independent	4	M

== Twin towns – sister cities ==
Jászapáti is twinned with:

- Glodeni, Romania (2014)
- Kamenín, Slovakia (2010)
- Temerin, Serbia (2011)

== Notable residents ==
- János Pócs (1963-), politician
- József Tajti (1943-), footballer and coach
- Elemér Gombos (1915-unknown), Olympic swimmer
- Pál Vágó (1853-1928), painter

== Gallery ==
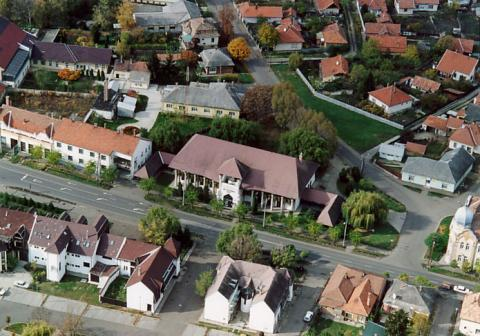
Aerial photography of Jászapáti

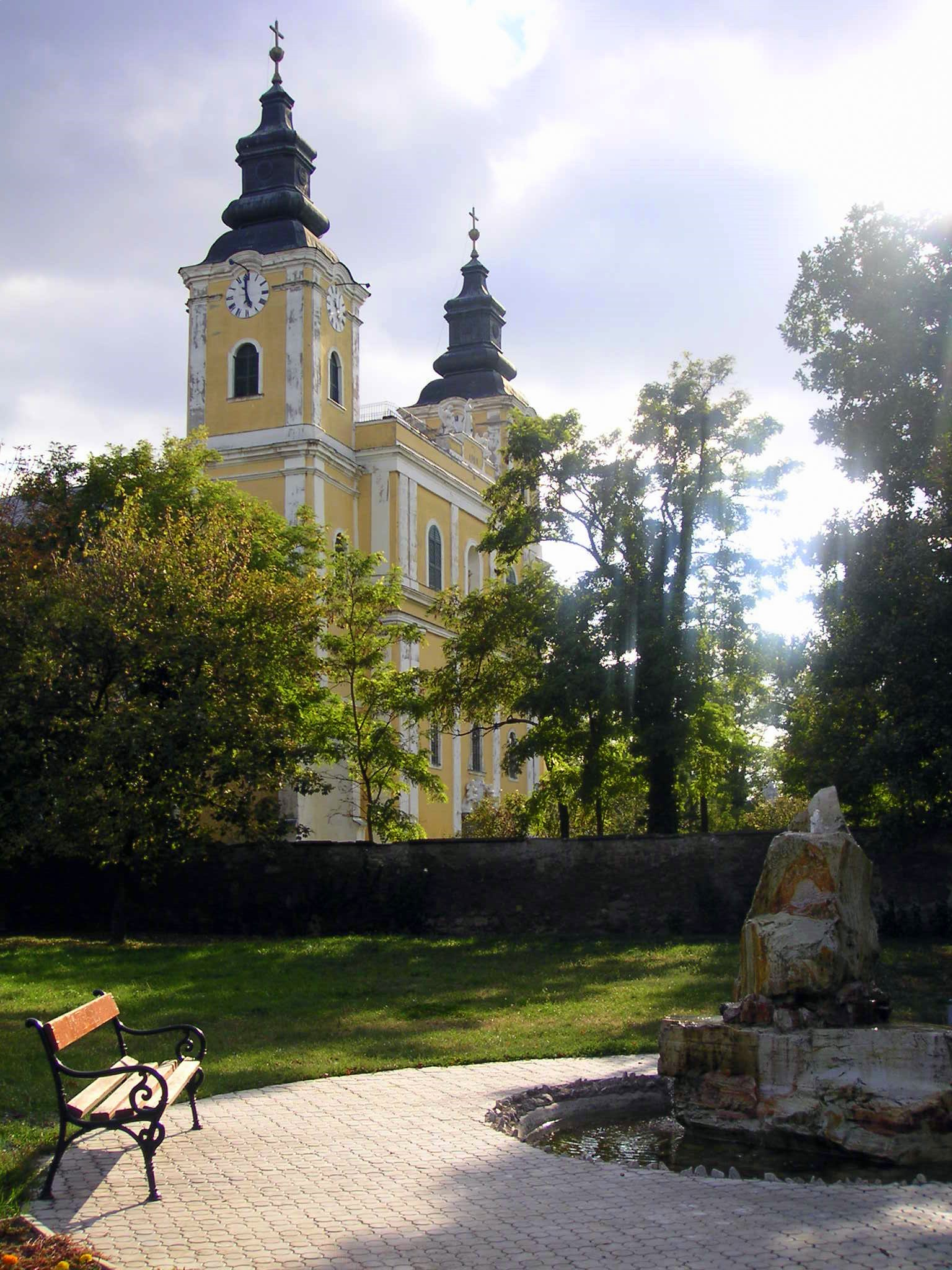
Jászapáti church

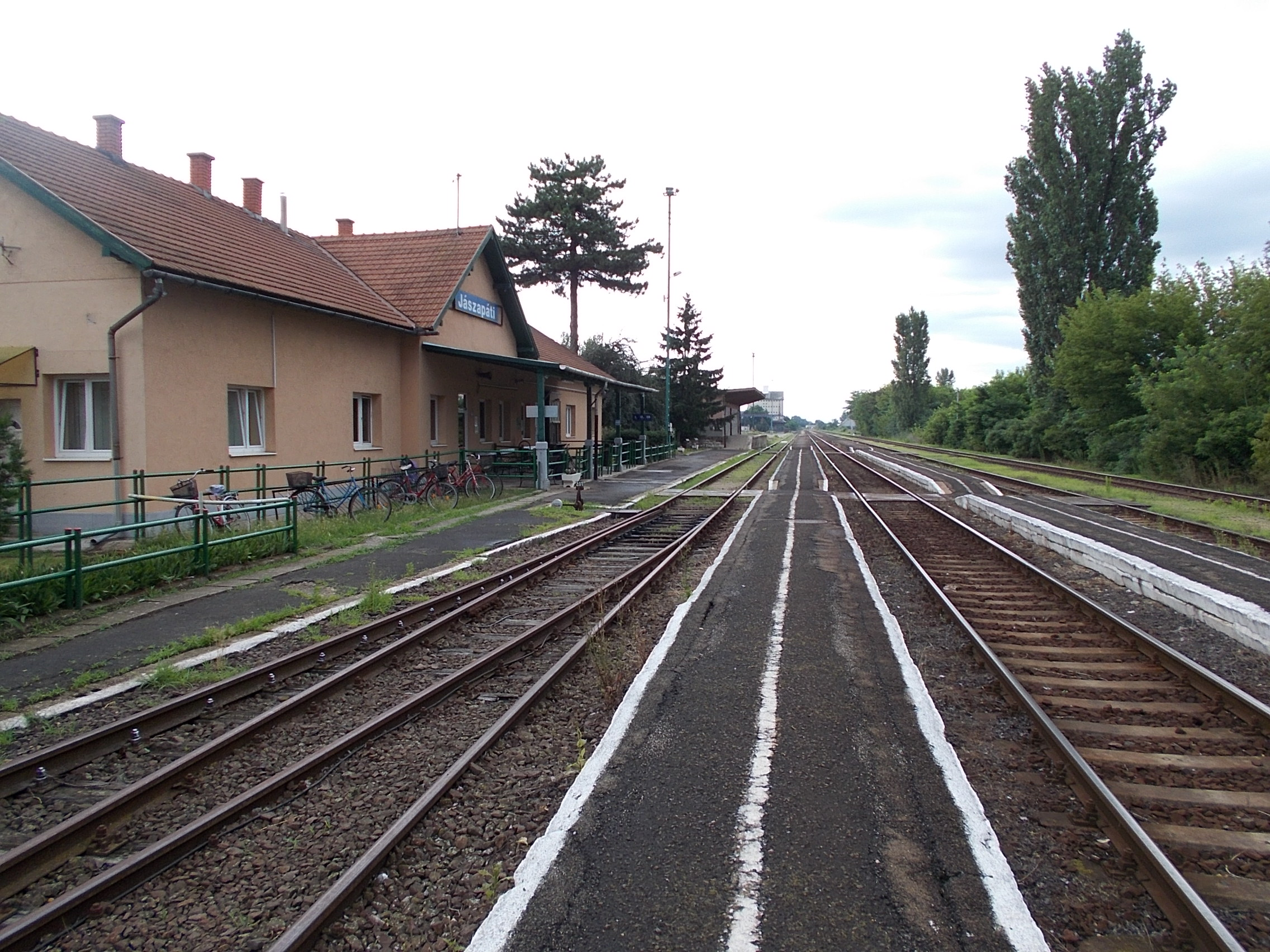
The train station in Jászapáti

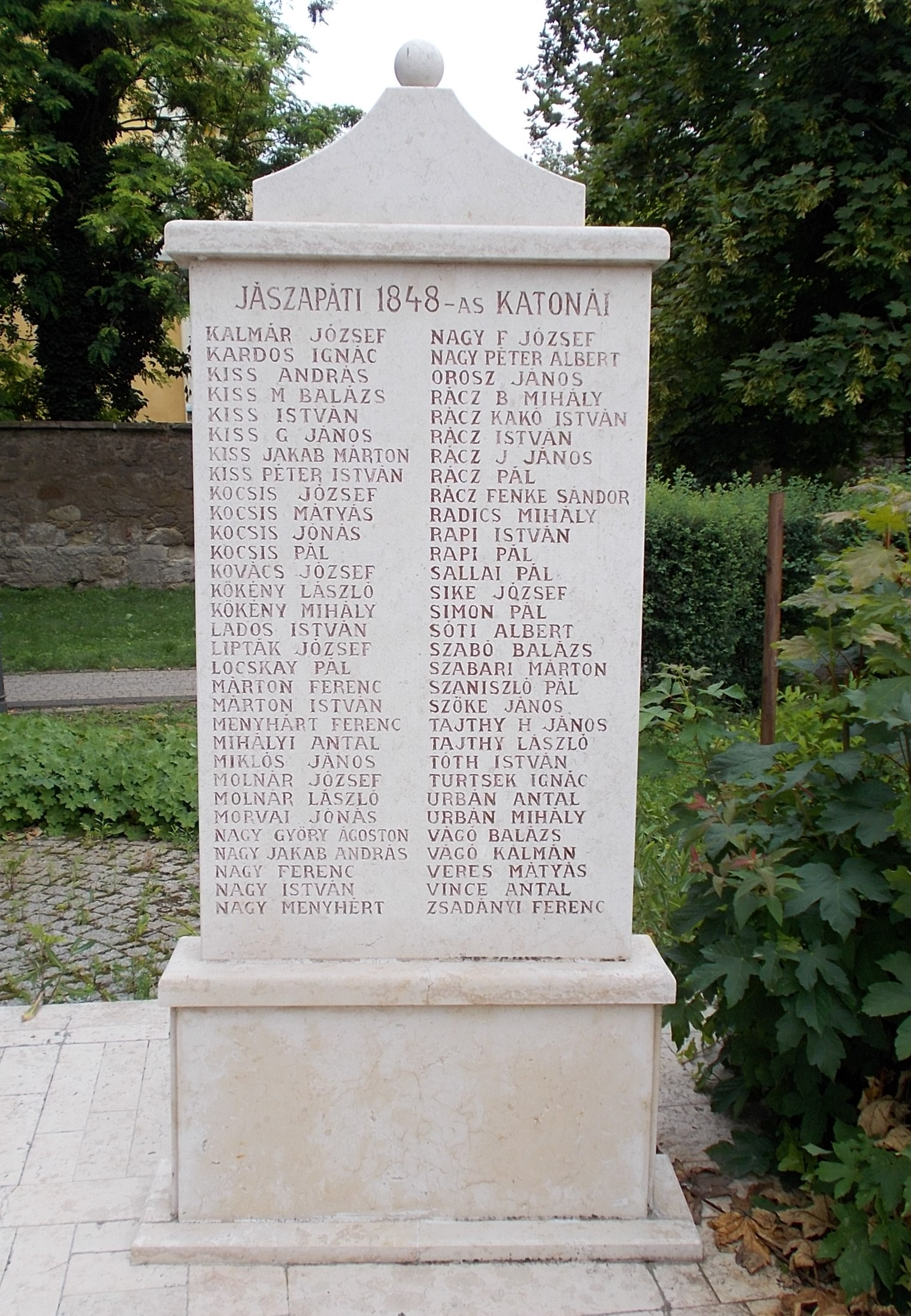
Memorial for soldiers from Jászapáti during the Hungarian Revolution of 1848

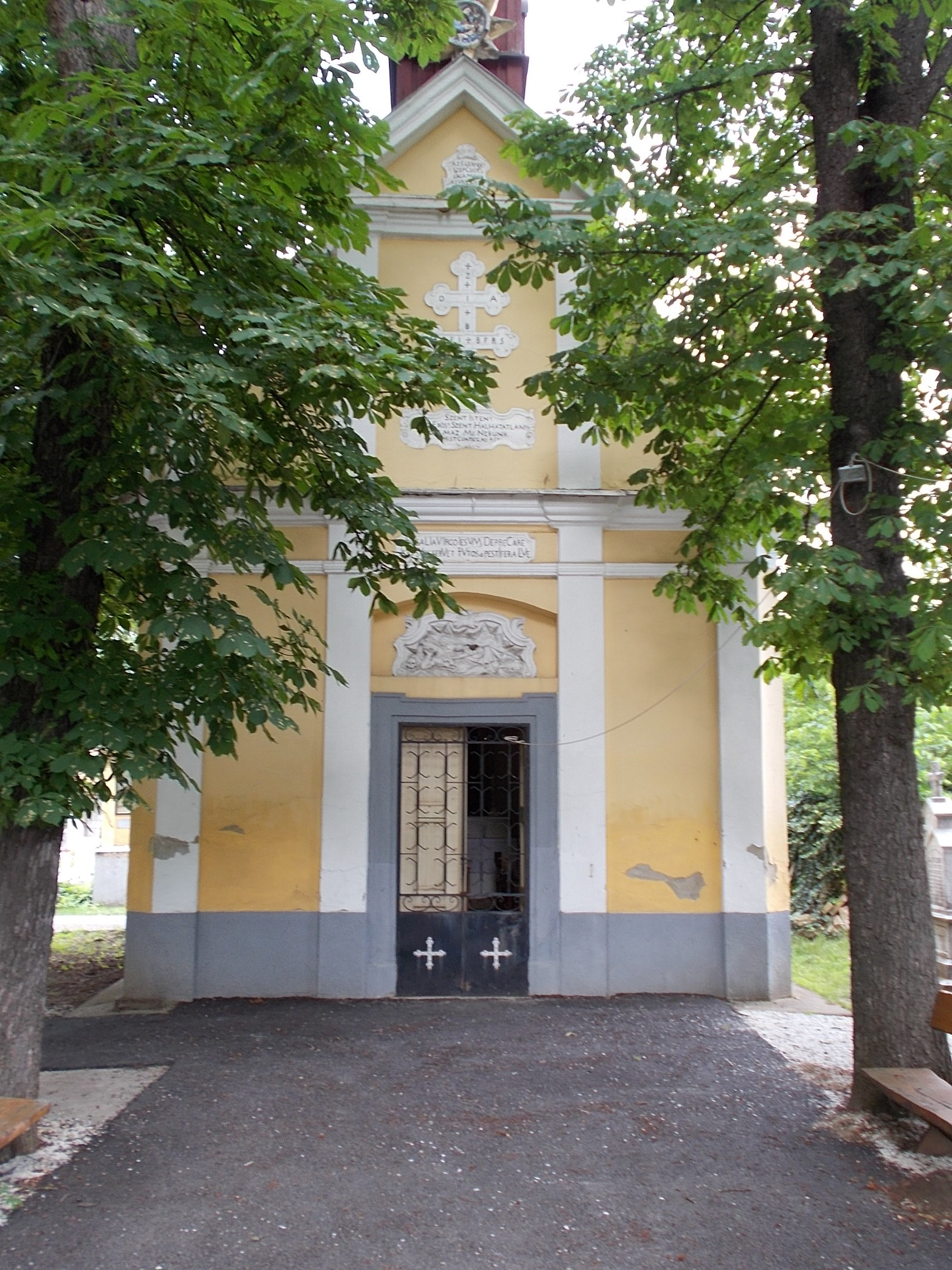
A cemetery chapel

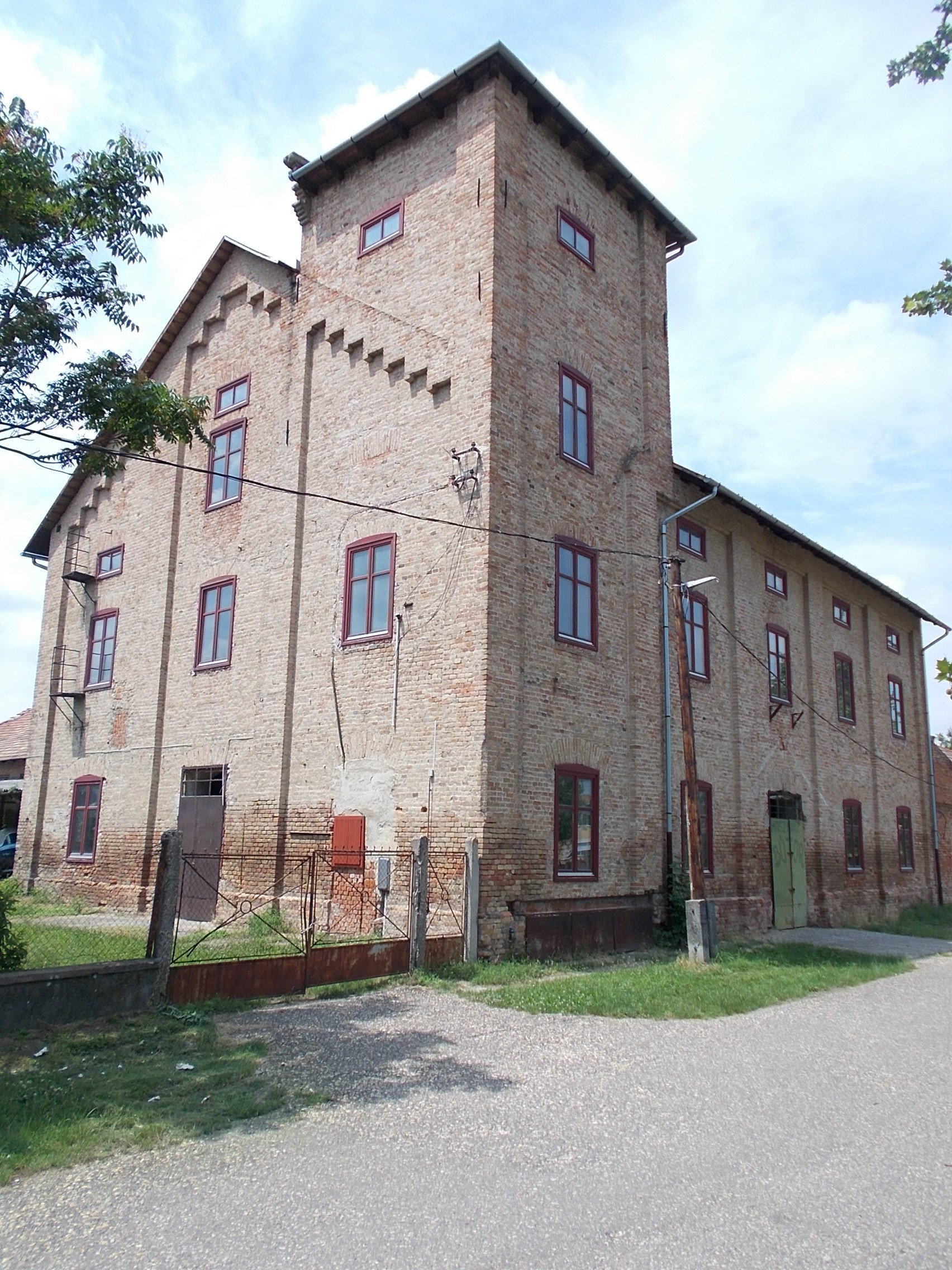
Former Jászapáti mill
