= Peninsula / Félsziget Festival =

Music festival in Romania

Peninsula Festival
- Genre: Rock, pop, electro
- Dates: July
- Locations: Târgu Mureș, Romania
- Years active: 2003–2013

Peninsula was a summer music festival taking place annually in Transylvania, Romania. It was one of Romania's largest music festivals.

== Festival ==
Peninsula was an eclectic festival, with stages for different musical styles: rock, metal, pop, electro, world music, folk, hip-hop, blues and jazz. The festival gathered yearly up to 10–15 major bands, and up to 40–70 Central and Eastern European bands which are more or less known outside their countries' borders.

Besides, the festival featured a number of other activities: about 30 sports (football, table tennis, badminton, beach volleyball, chess, sumo, paintball, karting, archery, zip-line, kayaking, swimming etc.) including some extreme sport facilities (bungee jumping, climbing, paragliding etc.), movie projections in partnership with the Transilvania International Film Festival, theatre shows and workshops, stand-up comedy shows, graffiti contests and other creative activities, ecological workshops, volunteering workshops and training etc.

Volunteering was another important aspect of this festival. Annually, hundreds of youngsters from all over Romania gathered at this event and enhanced their experience by volunteering activities within the festival.

== History ==
The first edition of the festival goes back to 2003. Organised by some members of the team of Sziget Festival, Peninsula (in Romanian) has grown steadily in terms of audience (from 20,000 in 2003 to 60,000 in 2009) as in the number, the variety and the quality of the bands: at the first edition there were Romanian bands, but in later editions bands from all over the world were invited.

In 2013, the organisers have decided to move the festival to a different city, namely Cluj-Napoca. As the city was chosen as the 2015 European Youth Capital, it only seemed as a strategical move. However, participants experienced a number of loopholes, from smaller location to a smaller number of bands. Initially, the line-up featured well-known bands such as Kaiser Chiefs, who eventually had to cancel.

After 2013, the festival was cancelled. Since 2017, VIBE festival is held in the location of the old Peninsula / Félsziget.

== Line-ups ==
Year	Main artists
2014	Cancelled
2013	(Germany) Paul Kalkbrenner; (Italy) Alborosie; (Serbia) Emir Kusturica; (Bosnia and Herzegovina) The No Smoking Orchestra; (Spain) Ska-P; (United States) Marky Ramone’s Blitzkrieg; (United Kingdom) Modestep; (Germany) N.O.H.A.; (Austria) Camo & Krooked; (United Kingdom) Benga; (United Kingdom) Pete Tong; (Slovenia) Umek; (Germany) RotFront; (Romania) Șuie Paparude; (Italy) The Sweet Life Society; (United Kingdom) Utah Jazz & Stamina MC; (Hungary) Ocho Macho; (United Kingdom) Utah Jazz & Stamina MC; (Canada) Lemon Bucket Orkestra; (Romania) Sarmalele Reci; (Romania) Negură Bunget; (Romania) Luna Amară; (Hungary) Acapella WindSingers; (Hungary) Mango aka Modul; (Hungary) Subotage; (Romania) Magda Puskas & friends; (Romania) Mushroom Story; (Hungary) Kistehén; (Hungary) Subscribe; (Hungary) Julian; (Hungary) Intim Torna Illegál; (Romania) The Amsterdams; (Ukraine) Traff!c; (Romania) Robin And The Backstabbers; (Romania) Guilty Lemon; (Romania) Niște Băieți; (Romania) Ada Milea; (Romania) Hot Club de Cluj; (Romania) GoodBye To Gravity; (Romania) Roadkill Soda; (Romania) Breathelast; (Romania) Scars of a Story; (Romania) Rock'n ghenă; (Romania) Divided By Perception; (Romania) Face Today; (Romania) Tboys – Missile & Goranga; (Romania) That Couch Funk Collective; (Romania) Neatbik; (Romania) Saboar; (Romania) Ugly Astronaut 32
2012	(Finland) Children of Bodom; (United Kingdom) Tinie Tempah; (United Kingdom) The Straits; (Hungary) Ákos; (Belgium) Netsky; (France) Dirtyphonics; (Germany) N.O.H.A.; (United Kingdom) Emalkay; (Hungary) Subscribe; (Moldova) Zdob și Zdub; (Hungary) Republic (band); (Romania) Vama; (Romania) Vița de Vie; (United Kingdom) New Model Army; (Hungary) Besh o droM; (Romania) Șuie Paparude; (France) Babylon Circus
2011	(Germany) Guano Apes; (United Kingdom) Foreign Beggars; (Belgium) K's Choice; (United Kingdom) Kasabian; (Canada) Danko Jones; (Germany) Markus Schulz; (Romania) Grimus; (United States) Iggy Pop & The Stooges; (Netherlands) Within Temptation; (Sweden) HammerFall; (Australia) Dub FX; (Canada) Tiga
2010	(Australia) Dub FX; (United Kingdom) Tricky; (United States) KoЯn; (Finland) The Rasmus; (Sweden) Europe; (Netherlands) Fedde le Grand; (Spain) Ska-P; (United Kingdom) Above and Beyond; (United Kingdom) Sub Focus; (Netherlands) Noisia; (France) Babylon Circus; (Argentina) Hernan Cattaneo; (Austria) Parov Stelar; (United Kingdom) Gorillaz; (United Kingdom) Nero (band); (United Kingdom) Therapy?; (Serbia) Félix Lajkó; (Romania) Phoenix; (Hungary) Omega; (Hungary) Tankcsapda; (Moldova) Zdob si Zdub; (Hungary) Quimby; (Romania) Vama; (Hungary) Subscribe; (Hungary) PASO; (Romania) Suie Paparude; (Romania) Puya; (Romania) Grimus; (Hungary) Beatrice; (Hungary) Charlie; (Hungary) Irie Maffia; (Hungary) Pokolgép; (Romania) Taxi (Romanian band); (Romania) Sarmalele Reci
2009	(United Kingdom) The Prodigy; (United States) Nine Inch Nails; (Netherlands) Tiësto; (United Kingdom) Freestylers; (Hungary) Tankcsapda; (Hungary) Neo; (United Kingdom) Primal Scream; (Hungary) Kispál és a Borz; (Romania) Grimus; (Germany) Blank & Jones; (United Kingdom) Chase & Status; (Hungary) Kaukázus; (Romania) Grimus; (Romania) DJ Gojira; (Romania) Sarmalele Reci
2008	(Germany) Avantasia; (United Kingdom) Morcheeba; (Germany) Beatsteaks; (Netherlands) Epica; (United Kingdom) LTJ Bukem & MC Conrad; (Hungary) Tankcsapda; (Hungary) Subscribe; (Hungary) Kispál és a Borz; (Hungary) Republic; (Hungary) 30Y; (Hungary) Kalapács; (Romania) The Mushroom Story; (Hungary) Ektomorf; (Romania) Vama; (Romania) Fading Circles; (Romania) Vita de Vie; (Romania) Altar
2007	(Norway) Theatre of Tragedy; (United Kingdom) Kosheen; (Australia) Pendulum (band); (France) Gojira; (United Kingdom) The Exploited; (Hungary) Tankcsapda; (Hungary) Kispál és a Borz; (Romania) Vita de Vie; (Romania) Altar; (Hungary) Ossian; (Hungary) Depresszió; (Hungary) Ákos; (Hungary) Quimby; (United States) Gogol Bordello; (France) The Booze Brothers
2006	(Finland) The Rasmus; (Hungary) Moby Dick; (Hungary) Bikini; (Hungary) Tankcsapda; (Romania) Phoenix; (Romania) Altar; (Hungary) Alvin es a mokusok
2005	(Finland) Apocalyptica; (United Kingdom) Freestylers; (Hungary) Tankcsapda; (Hungary) Ossian
2004	(United Kingdom) Chumbawamba; (Hungary) Republic (band); (Hungary) Moby Dick; (Hungary) Tankcsapda
2003	

== See also ==
- Gărâna Jazz Festival - Gărâna, Caraş-Severin
