= Grimus (disambiguation) =

Grimus is a fantasy novel by Salman Rushdie.

Grimus may also refer to:

- Grimus (band), an alternative rock band from Romania
- Anton Grimus (born 1990), Australian freestyle skier
