= Sziget Festival =

Music and cultural festival in Budapest, Hungary

Coordinates: 47°33′14″N 19°03′18″E

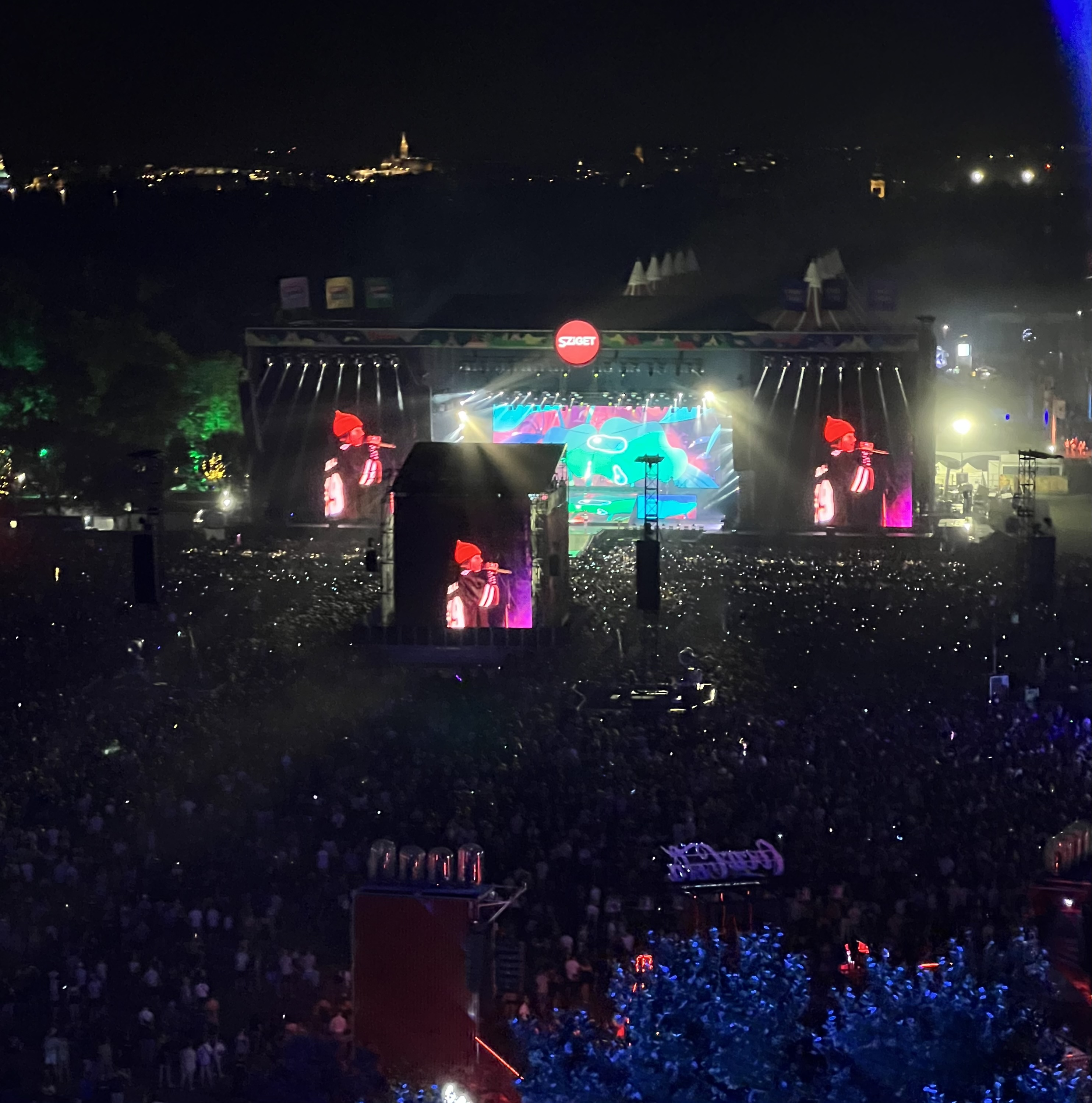
- Genre: Rock · alternative rock · psychedelic rock · punk rock · heavy metal · pop · synthpop · reggae · hip hop · indie · world · electronic
- Dates: Seven days, usually starting in the first week of August
- Locations: Budapest, Hungary
- Years active: 1993–present
- Founders: Müller Péter Sziámi, Károly Gerendai and others
- Attendance: 530,000 (2019)
- Capacity: 92,000
- Website: sziget.hu

Sziget Festival (Hungarian: Sziget Fesztivál, lit. 'Island Festival', pronounced [ˈsiɡɛt ˈfɛstivaːl]) is one of the largest music and cultural festivals in Europe. It is held every August in northern Budapest, Hungary, on Óbudai-sziget ("Old Buda Island"), a leafy 108-hectare (266-acre) island on the Danube. More than 1,000 performances take place each year.

The week-long festival has grown from a relatively low-profile student event in 1993 to become one of the prominent European rock festivals, with about half of all visitors coming from outside Hungary, especially from Western Europe. It also has a dedicated "party train" service (with resident DJs) that transports festival-goers from all over Europe. The second event (1994), labelled Eurowoodstock, was headlined by performers from the original Woodstock festival. By 1997, total attendance exceeded 250,000, and by 2001 reached 360,000. In 2018 that record was broken when 565,000 visitors attended the festival. Since the mid-2000s, Sziget Festival has been increasingly labelled as a European alternative to the Burning Man festival due to its unique features ("an electronically amplified, warped amusement park that has nothing to do with reality").

In 2011, Sziget was ranked one of the 5 best festivals in Europe by The Independent. The festival is a two-time winner at the European Festivals Awards in the category Best Major European Festival, in 2011 and 2014.

In 2002, Sziget branched out to Transylvania when its organisers co-created a new annual festival there titled Félsziget Fesztivál (Romanian: Festivalul Peninsula) that soon became the largest of its kind in Romania. In 2007, the organisers co-created Balaton Sound, an electronic music festival held on the southern bank of Lake Balaton that quickly gained popularity.

== History ==
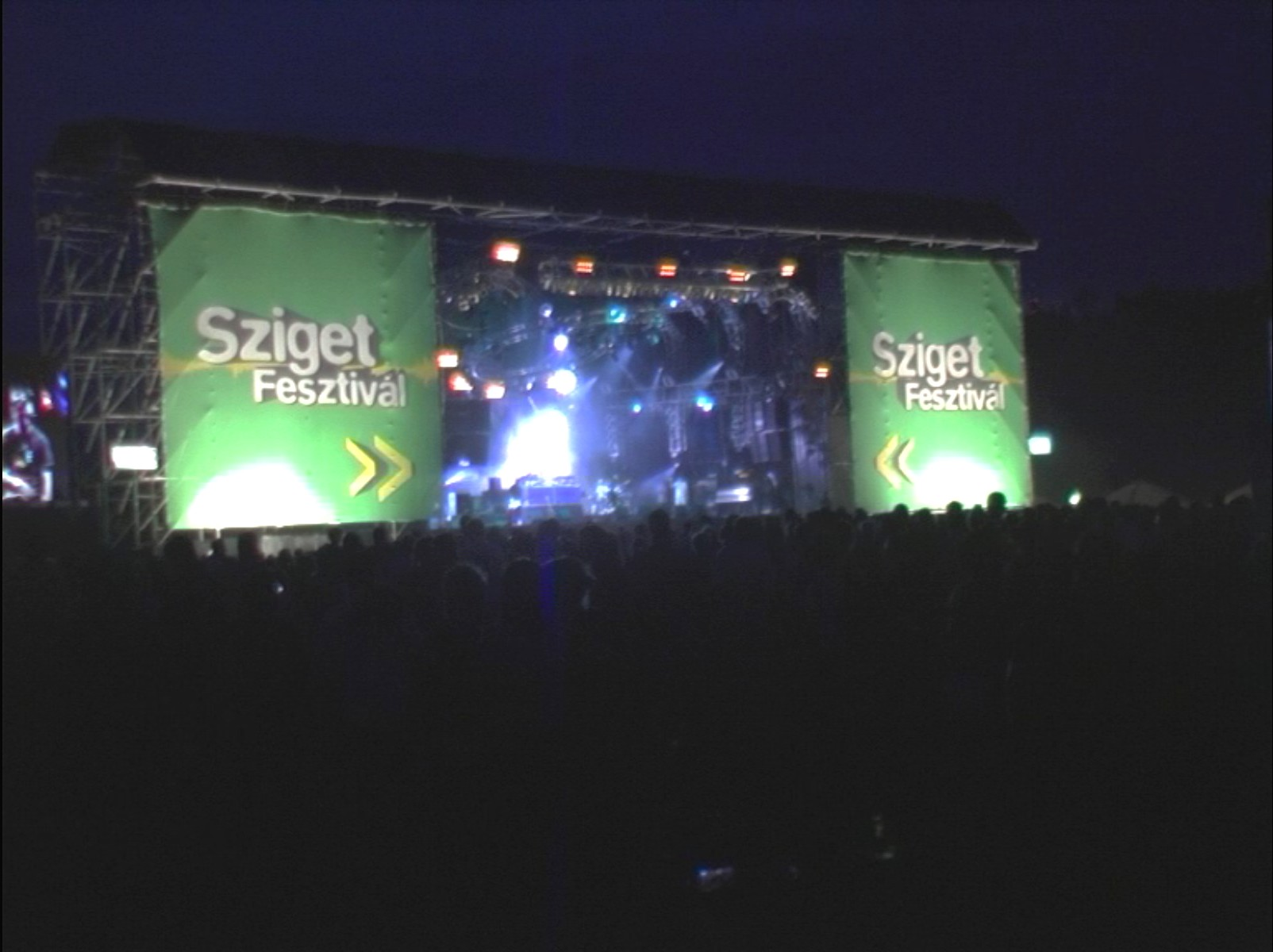
Sziget 2003

Following the end of the Communist era in 1989, the formerly lively summer festival scene in Budapest faced a crisis due to a sudden loss of governmental funding. A group of artists and rock enthusiasts proposed the Sziget event as a way to bridge this gap. The festival was started in 1993, originally called Diáksziget (Student Island). This first event was organised by music fans in their spare time and ran well over budget, taking until 1997 to repay the losses. From 1996 to 2001 it was sponsored by Pepsi and renamed Pepsi Sziget. It has been called Sziget Fesztivál ("island festival") since 2002.

A comprehensive survey was done and published on the risktaking behaviour and mood of Sziget visitors (2007) by the National Institute for Health Promotion (OEI). The survey revealed amongst others that the last sexual encounter of 9.4% of its participants was unprotected.

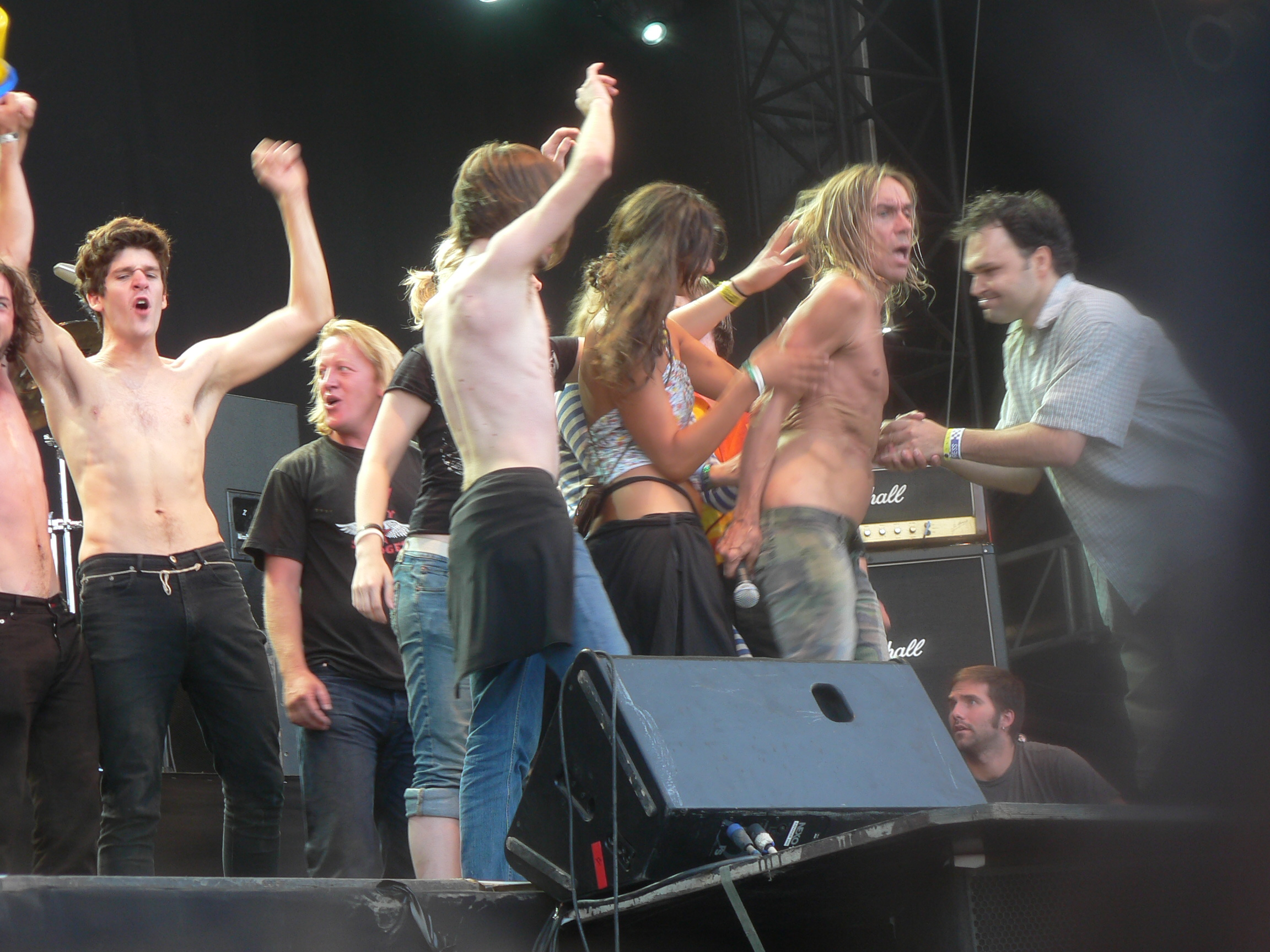
Iggy Pop and folks on main stage, 2006

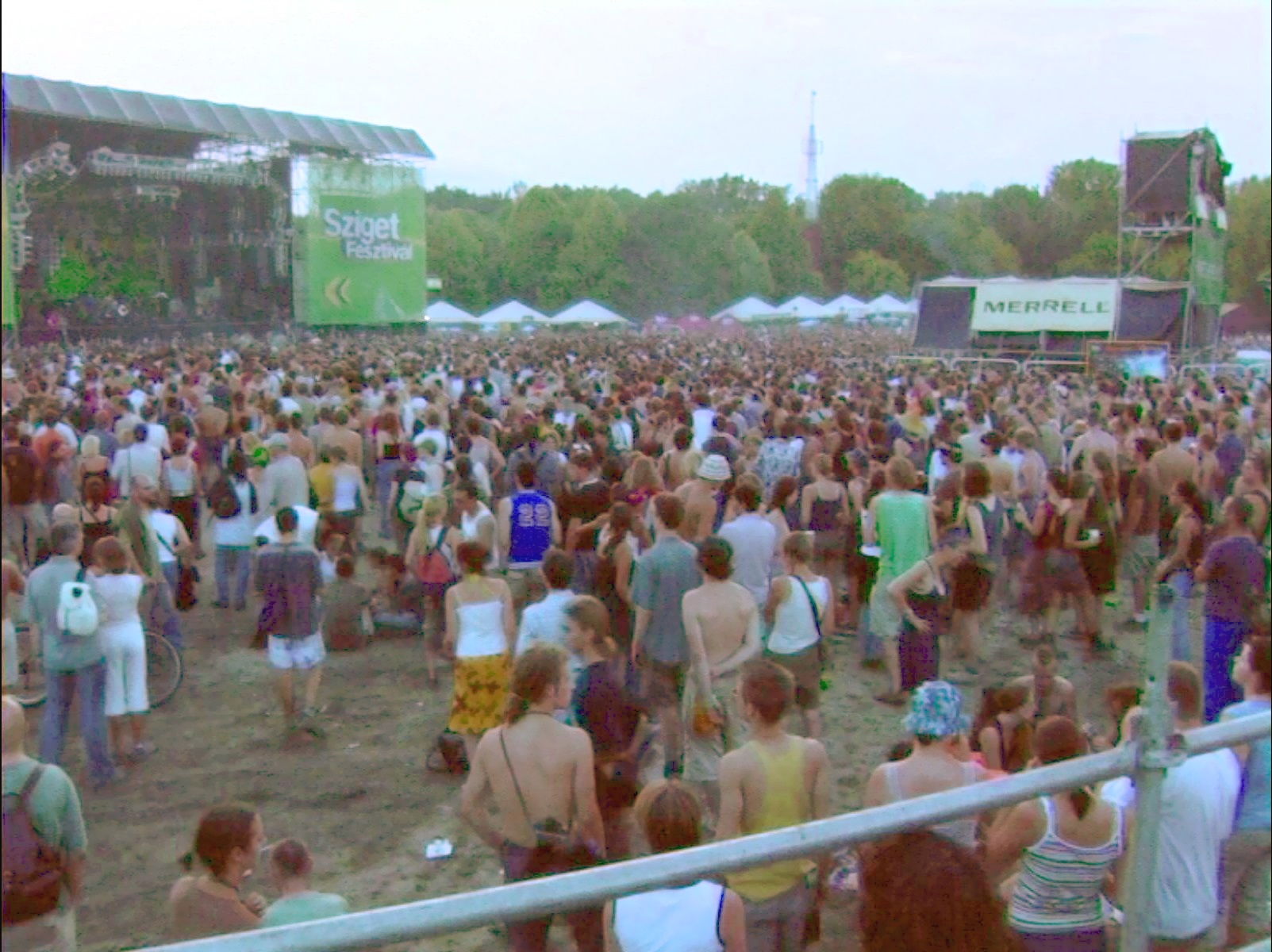
Sziget 2003 main stage

Sziget Festival is notable in that it contains acts from many different genres. 2006 saw, among others, a blues stage, a jazz tent, a world music stage, alongside the main stage with more typical popular rock acts.

The festival is popular with west Europeans. Around 50% of visitors come from outside Hungary, with the largest group coming from the Netherlands. Many also come from Belgium, the UK, Germany, Italy, France, Ireland and Romania.

Being located on an island, some festival goers have tried to enter by swimming across the Danube or by paddling across in inflatable rafts. The organisers discourage these attempts as it is dangerous due to the tricky nature of the fast-flowing Danube river.

In 2024, an American private equity group, KKR has agreed to buy the company behind Sziget Festival (together with other European music festivals).

== 2008 ==
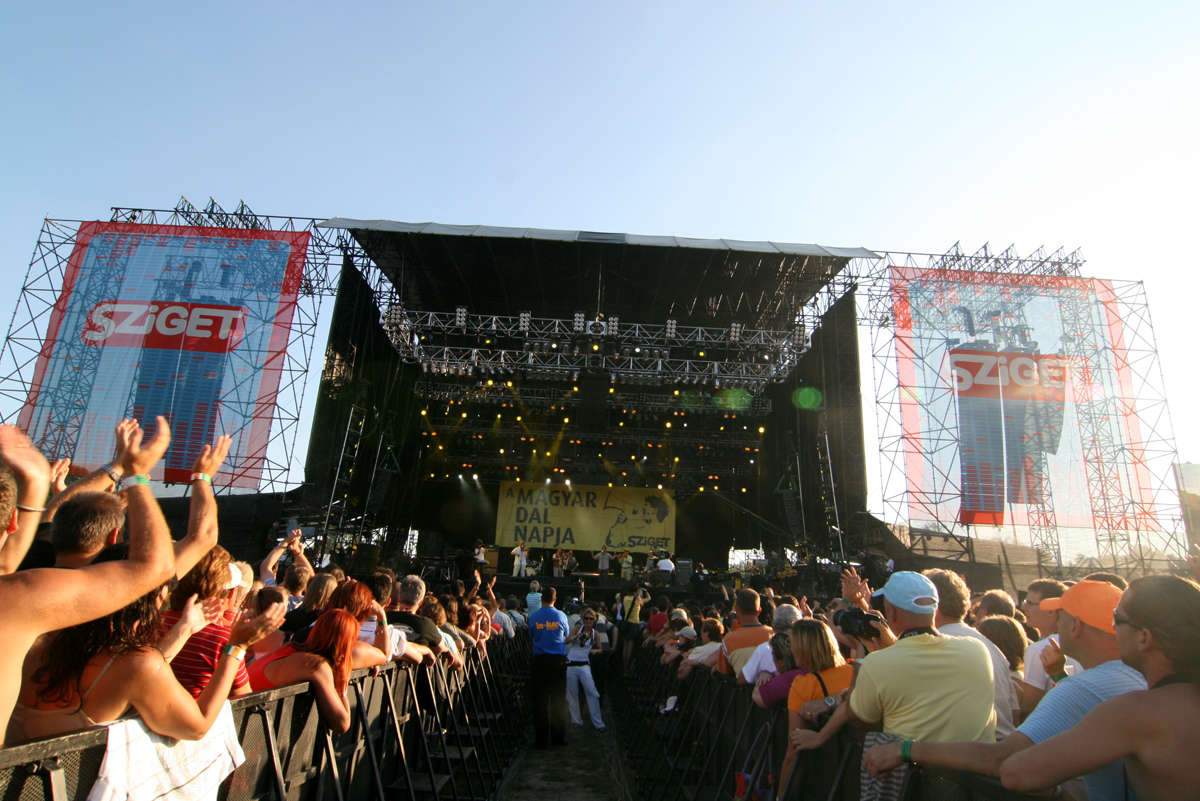
Sziget 2008

In 2008, Sziget Festival lasted from 11 to 18 August. The festival, instead of 7+1 days as in 2007, was 5+2 days long, with a "zeroeth day" that featured one major gig (Iron Maiden) and a special "minus first day" called "Day of Hungarian Songs" that headlined a number of popular Hungarian rock bands (including LGT and Beatrice). As well as Iron Maiden, R.E.M., Mass Hysteria, Babyshambles, Sex Pistols, Jamiroquai, Anti-Flag, Flogging Molly, Alanis Morissette, the Killers, the Kooks, Kaiser Chiefs, the Cribs, Speak and many other were also confirmed, the day of their performance is available at the Sziget website. The length of the festival was reduced so that the residents living in the neighborhoods nearby would have less trouble because of the noise. The organizers plan to take further steps to reduce noise: the metal stage will be open until 11 pm only and noise filtering walls will be built near the noisiest stages.

== 2009 ==
Sziget 2009 was 10–17 August 2009. The festival had a 5+2 day schedule again. The "zeroeth day" had a Rock Against Racism concert, featuring mostly Hungarian bands. The "minus first day" had one major gig again, this time the 20th anniversary concert of Hungarian rock band Tankcsapda.

The Lineup:

Main Stage

IAMX, Nouvelle Vague, Ska-P, Snow Patrol, Lily Allen, Miss Platnum, The Ting Tings, Die Toten Hosen, Bloc Party, Fatboy Slim, Haydamaky, Jet, Primal Scream, Pendulum, The Prodigy, The Subways, Editors, Klaxons, Manic Street Preachers, Placebo, Disco Ensemble, Danko Jones, Maxïmo Park, The Offspring, Faith No More

World Music Main Stage

So Kalmery, Napra, Oi Va Voi, Calexico, 08001, Orquesta Buena Vista Social Club, Figli Di Madre Ignota, Zamballarana, Amadou & Mariam Speed Caravan, Woven Hand & Muzsikás, N&SK, Khaled, Vieux Farka Touré, Tiken Jah Fakoly, Brotherhood of Brass: Boban Marković Orkestar + Frank London's Klezmer Brass Allstars

A38-WAN2 Stage:

Blasted Mechanism, De Staat, La Troba Kung-Fú, Matatu, Miloopa, Muchachito Bombo Infierno, Squarepusher, Tricky, White Lies, Babylon Circus

- White Lies' performance of "The Power and the Glory" from Sziget Festival was later used as the music video for the song.

Rock Stage:

Backyard Babies, Brujeria, Deathstars, Donots, Expatriate, Life of Agony, Satyricon, Turbonegro, Turisas

Party Arena:

Armin van Buuren, Birdy Nam Nam, Coldcut, Dillinja, Eric Prydz, Grooverider, Jose Padilla, Paul Oakenfold, Pete Tong, 808 State

== 2011 ==
=== Mainstage ===
Prince, Thirty Seconds to Mars, The Prodigy, Pulp, Chemical Brothers, White Lies, Kasabian, Kaiser Chiefs, Manic Street Preachers, Dizzee Rascal, Interpol, Flogging Molly, Kate Nash, British Sea Power, Skunk Anansie, Gogol Bordello, La Roux, Rise Against, The National, Hadouken!, Good Charlotte, Batucada Sound Machine.

=== Worldmusic Stage ===
AfroCubism, Rotfront, Ojos de Brujo, Gotan Project, Eliades Ochoa, Hurlements d’Leo, Debout Sur Le Zinc, Goran Bregovic Wedding & Funeral Band and Shtetl Super Stars.

=== Party Arena ===
Crystal Castles, 2 Many DJ's, Empire of the Sun, Goose (Belgian band) and Zombie Nation.

=== Europe Stage ===
Söhne Mannheims, Verdena, Go Back to the Zoo and Triggerfinger.

=== A38/Wan2 Stage ===
De Jeugd Van Tegenwoordig, Baskerville, DeWolff, Kees van Hondt, Selah Sue, Marina and the Diamonds, Bloody Beetroots, Death Crew 77 and Hurts.

=== Metal Mainstage ===
Deftones, Lostprophets, Within Temptation, Sonata Arctica, Judas Priest and Motörhead.

== 2014 ==
=== Mainstage ===
Monday, August 11: Ivan & The Parazol, Leningrad, The 1975, Tankcsapda, Blink-182

Tuesday, August 12: Anti-Flag, Ska-P, Queens of the Stone Age, Deadmau5

Wednesday, August 13: Jake Bugg, Imagine Dragons, Placebo, Skrillex

Thursday, August 14: Mary PopKids, Bastille, Lily Allen, Macklemore & Ryan Lewis

Friday, August 15: Die Fantastischen Vier, CeeLo Green, Manic Street Preachers, Korn

Saturday, August 16: Bombay Bicycle Club, Punnany Massif, Madness, The Prodigy

Sunday, August 17: Triggerfinger, The Kooks, Outkast, Calvin Harris

=== A38 Stage ===
Tuesday, August 12: Brody Dalle, A Day to Remember, Casper, Jimmy Eat World, The Bloody Beetroots, Deniz Koyu, Thomas Gold (DJ), Sikztah

Wednesday, August 13: Girls in Hawaii, The Big Pink, Tom Odell, Miles Kane, Clean Bandit, R3hab, Madeon, Andro

Thursday, August 14: Michael Kiwanuka, Fink, Irie Maffia, Bonobo, Stromae, Kavinsky (Outrun Live), Axwell, Muzzaik

Friday, August 15: Palma Violets, Band of Skulls, Angel Haze, Kelis, Klaxons, Sandro Silva, Laidback Luke, Dave Martin

Saturday, August 16: Starlight Girls, The BossHoss, Jagwar Ma, Wild Beasts, Crystal Fighters, Quentin Mosimann, Fedde le Grand, Julia Carpenter

Sunday, August 17: INVSN, Mount Kimbie, NOFX, La Roux, Darkside, DJAIKOVSKI ft. TK Wonder & MC Wasp, Ian Autorun, Borgore, Black Sun Empire, Jade

== Lawsuit ==
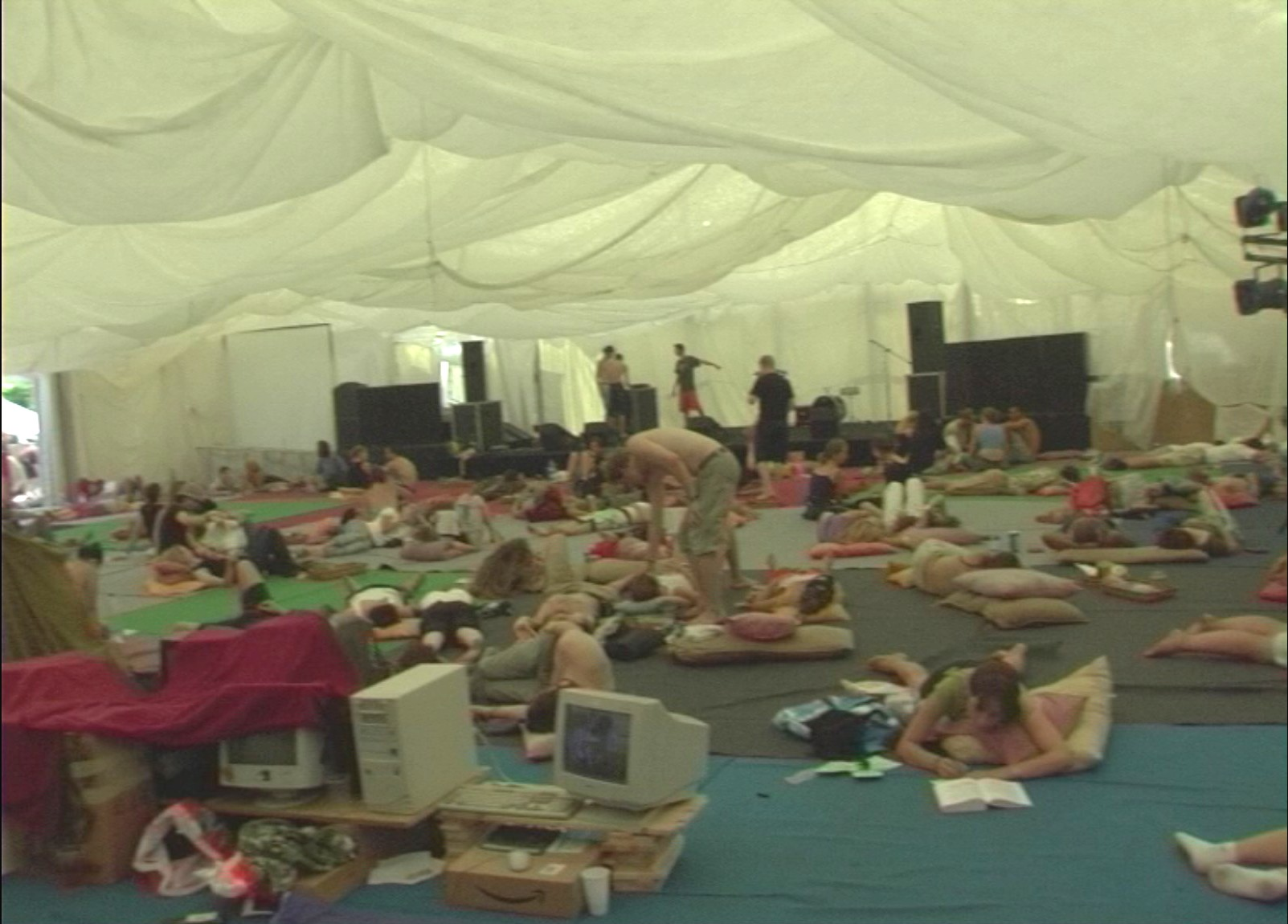
Sziget 2003 chill-out tent

Dr. Tamas Derce, the mayor of Újpest, the 4th district of Budapest, has sued Sziget Festival, claiming that the event is so loud the locals cannot sleep at night. The mayor wants to force the organisers by court decision to cease every program between 6 pm and 10 am - which virtually means closing down the festival. The mayor already lost a similar case against Sziget at court in 2002. The organizers of the 2008 festival promised local officials that the main stage will shut down at 11 pm and no music on that stage will be played after that. For this reason the Iron Maiden concert was taken from its original starting time of 9:30 pm to 9:00 pm.

== Previous years ==
Year	Name	Visitors (Note: all days combined)	Main artists
1993	Diáksziget '93	43,000	Hungarian artists only
1994	Diáksziget '94; Eurowoodstock	143,000	The Birds; Blood, Sweat & Tears; Eric Burdon; Grandmothers of Invention (Frank Zappa's band); Jefferson Starship; Jethro Tull; Ten Years After
1995	Diáksziget '95	173,000	Clawfinger; Jeff Healey; John Cale; Kava Kava; Stranglers
1996	Pepsi Sziget 1996	206,000	Iggy Pop; Slash; Sonic Youth; The Bates; The Levellers; The Prodigy; The Stone Roses; Therapy?
1997	Pepsi Sziget 1997	260,000	David Bowie; Chumbawamba; dEUS; Faith No More; Foo Fighters; Motörhead; New Model Army (band); Rollins Band; The Cardigans; Toy Dolls; Tankcsapda
1998	Pepsi Sziget 1998	268,000	Boney M; Chumbawamba; Coolio; Goldie; Green Day; Mory Kanté; Paradise Lost; Patti Smith; Rammstein; Tankcsapda; Shane MacGowan and the Pogues; Therapy?
1999	Pepsi Sziget 1999	297,000	Apocalyptica; Asian Dub Foundation; Baaba Maal; Brand New Heavies; Faithless; Guano Apes; Kool and the Gang; Liquido; Paradise Lost; Rachid Taha; Suede; Tankcsapda; Troitsa
2000	Pepsi Sziget 2000	324,000	Apollo 440; Baaba Maal; Chumbawamba; 16 Horsepower; Bad Religion; Bloodhound Gang; Clawfinger; Die Ärzte; FreshFabrik; Gods Tower; Guano Apes; HIM; K2R Riddim; Lou Reed; Oasis; Suzanne Vega; Tankcsapda; Therapy?; Troitsa
2001	Pepsi Sziget 2001	365,000	Ash; Anathema; Bomfunk MCs; Jimmy Bosch; Eagle Eye Cherry; Faithless; Freestylers; FreshFabrik; Guano Apes; HammerFall; HIM; Ignite; Khaled; Moonspell; Morcheeba; Nightwish; Noir Desir; Omara Portuondo; Overkill; Placebo; Rage; Värttinä; Run DMC; Tankcsapda
2002	Sziget 2002	355,000	Amorphis; Baaba Maal; Destruction; Die Toten Hosen; Edguy; FreshFabrik; Gamma Ray; HIM; Iggy Pop; Jovanotti; Kreator; Kosheen; Mory Kanté; Muse; Natacha Atlas; Nightwish; Pulp; Savatage; Stereo MCs; The 69 Eyes; The Cure; The Gathering; The Klezmatics; Mission; Tito and Tarantula; Transglobal Underground; Troitsa; U.K. Subs; Tankcsapda
2003	Sziget 2003	361,000	Annihilator; Apocalyptica; Circle II Circle; DJ Rush; Fun Lovin' Criminals; Massive Attack; Morcheeba; My Dying Bride; Napalm Death; Seeed; Shaggy; Slayer; Sonata Arctica; Testament; The 69 Eyes; Troitsa; Tankcsapda
2004	Sziget 2004	369,000	Addictive TV; Amorphis; Anthrax; Ash; Basement Jaxx, Cannibal Corpse; Children of Bodom; Faithless; Freestylers; Fun Lovin' Criminals; Grave Digger; In Flames; Junkie XL; My Dying Bride; Paul Oakenfold; Saxon; Scissor Sisters; Sugababes; Bloodhound Gang; The Gathering; The Pet Shop Boys; The Rasmus; Tito and Tarantula
2005	Sziget 2005	385,000	Accept; Basement Jaxx; Buena Vista Social Club; Franz Ferdinand; C.F.F. e il Nomade Venerabile; Almamegretta; Good Charlotte; Ignite; KoЯn; Natalie Imbruglia; Nick Cave and the Bad Seeds; Obituary; Opeth; Paul van Dyk; Saxon; Sean Paul; Sentenced; The 69 Eyes; Underworld; Wickeda
2006	Sziget 2006	385,000	17 Hippies; Addictive TV; Cradle of Filth; Craig; Evergrey; Fear Factory; Franz Ferdinand; Gogol Bordello; Hadag Nahash; Iggy and the Stooges; Jovanotti; Kispál és a Borz; Leningrad; Les Doigts de l'Homme; Lila Bloom; La Ruda; Living Colour; maNga; Ministry; Natacha Atlas; OneRepublic; Placebo; Radical Face; Radiohead; Robert Plant; Scissor Sisters; Sick of It All; Sons and daughters; Sunrise Avenue; The Gathering; The Prodigy; The Rasmus; The Skinny Bohemians; Therapy?; Tryo; Wir sind Helden
2007	Sziget Festival 2007	371,000	Alpha Blondy; Eagles Of Death Metal; What Cheer? Brigade; Ennio Marchetto; Faithless; Fusedmarc (LT); Gogol Bordello; The Good, the Bad & the Queen; Kispál és a Borz; Laurent Garnier; Madness; Manu Chao; Nine Inch Nails; Pink; Quimby; Razorlight; Sinéad O'Connor; Tankcsapda; The Chemical Brothers; The Hives; The Killers; The Rakes; TNMK; Tool
2008	Sziget Festival 2008	385,000	Alanis Morissette; Apocalyptica; Avantasia; Mass Hysteria; Anti-Flag; Babyshambles; Carcass; Die Ärzte; Exodus; Flogging Molly; Iced Earth; Iron Maiden; Jamiroquai; Justice; Kaiser Chiefs; Kispál és a Borz; Lacrimas Profundere; Lauren Harris; Mademoiselle K; Meshuggah; Millencolin; Pannonia Allstars Ska Orchestra; R.E.M.; Róisín Murphy; Sabaton; Serj Tankian; Sex Pistols; Tankcsapda; The Cribs; The Killers; The Kooks; The Presidents of the United States of America; The Wombats; MGMT; URH; Volbeat; Ziggi & The Renaissance Band
2009	Sziget Festival 2009	390,000	The Prodigy; The Offspring; Faith No More; IAMX; Paul Oakenfold; Žagar; Coldcut; Birdy Nam Nam; Fatboy Slim; Lily Allen; Ska-P; Tricky; Placebo; Nouvelle Vague; Buena Vista Social Club; White Lies; Armin Van Buuren; Al Di Meola; Crystal Method; Haydamaky; Manic Street Preachers; Pendulum; Bloc Party; Klaxons; José Padilla; The Ting Tings; Tiken Jah Fakoly
2010	Sziget Festival 2010	382,000	08001; Thirty Seconds to Mars; Amparo Sanchez; Antytila; AWS; Bad Religion; Billy Talent; Cankisou; Children of Bodom; Csík zenekar és vendégei; Danko Jones; Death Valley Screamers; Enter Shikari; Faithless; Fear Factory; Gorillaz Sound System; Gwar; Ill Niño; Infected Mushroom; Iron Maiden; Jaune Toujours; Kamelot; K.I.Z; Kasabian; Kati Kovács & The Qualitons; Kries; Lyapis Trubetskoy; Madness; Miz; Monster Magnet; Ez3kiel; Muse; Papa Roach; Paradise Lost; Ska-P; Skindred; Subsonica; The 69 Eyes; The Freelancers; The Hives
2011	Sziget Festival 2011	385,000	Prince; Pulp; Interpol; La Roux; Good Charlotte; Kasabian; Hurts; The Chemical Brothers; Crystal Castles; Xiu Xiu; British Sea Power; Skunk Anansie; Dizzee Rascal; The Prodigy; Hadouken!; Kate Nash; Kaiser Chiefs; Thirty Seconds to Mars; Peter Bjorn & John; Gogol Bordello; The National; Manic Street Preachers; White Lies; Marina & The Diamonds; Judas Priest; Motörhead; Within Temptation; Deftones; Lostprophets; Go Back To The Zoo; Tankcsapda; Quimby; Oi Va Voi; Gotan Project; Flogging Molly
2012	Sziget Festival 2012	379,000	The Paperboats; Snoop Dogg; Sum 41; The Stone Roses; Placebo; Hurts; Crystal Fighters; The Horrors; The Subways; Mando Diao; Noah and the Whale; Friendly Fires; The Vaccines; Two Door Cinema Club; Korn; Magnetic Man; dEUS; Steve Aoki; Bebel Gilberto; Axwell; Beatsteaks; Caro Emerald; Ministry; The XX; Anna Calvi; The Ting Tings; Glasvegas; LMFAO; Paolo Nutini; Fink; The Orange Fandangos; The Killers; DJ Fresh; Maxïmo Park; Dimmu Borgir; HammerFall; Molotov
2013	Sziget Festival 2013	362,000	!!!; Bad Religion; Bat For Lashes; Biffy Clyro; Blur; Boys Noize live; David Guetta; Enter Shikari; Deichkind; Die Ärzte; Dizzee Rascal; Editors; Empire of the Sun; Everything Everything; Franz Ferdinand; Hadouken!; Little Boots; Leningrad; Nick Cave And The Bad Seeds; Nicky Romero; Mika (singer); Oscar Mulero; Parov Stelar Band; Regina Spektor; Seeed; Skunk Anansie; Tame Impala; The Bots; Triggerfinger; Woodkid; Dubioza kolektiv
2014	Sziget Festival 2014	415,000	A Day to Remember; Anti-Flag; Axwell; Bastille; Blink-182; Borgore; Brody Dalle; Calvin Harris; Caparezza; Clifford Irving; Cornerstone Roots; Crystal Fighters; Deadmau5; Fedde le Grand; Fink; Imagine Dragons; Jake Bugg; Jimmy Eat World; Klaxons; Korn; La Roux; Leningrad (band); Lily Allen; Macklemore & Ryan Lewis; Madness; Miles Kane; NOFX; Outkast; Placebo; Queens of the Stone Age; Rumatera; Ska-P; Skrillex; Stromae; Tankcsapda; The 1975; The Big Pink; The Kooks; The Prodigy
2015	Sziget Festival 2015	441,000	Alesso; Alt-J; Asaf Avidan; Avicii; Blasterjaxx; C2C; Dropkick Murphys; Ella Eyre; Ellie Goulding; Enter Shikari; Florence and the Machine; Foals; Gentlemen & the Evolution; Gogol Bordello; Hollywood Undead; Interpol; Kasabian; Kings of Leon; Kraftklub; Knife Party; Limp Bizkit; Major Lazer; Marina and the Diamonds; Martin Garrix; MØ; Nervo; Paloma Faith; Passenger; Rudimental; Robbie Williams; SBTRKT; Selah Sue; The Script; The Ting Tings; Turrentine Jones; W&W
2016	Sziget Festival 2016	496,000	Afrojack; Bastille; Bring me the Horizon; Bloc Party; Bullet for My Valentine; CHVRCHES; David Guetta; Editors; Hardwell; John Newman; Kodaline; M83; MØ; Muse; Naughty Boy; Nicky Romero; Noel Gallagher; Parkway Drive; Parov Stelar; Rihanna; Sia; Sum 41; Sigúr Ros; Teapot Industries; The Last Shadow Puppets; The Lumineers; Zedd
2017	Sziget Festival 2017	452,000	Alex Clare; Alex Vargas; Allah-Las; Alt-J; Andy C; Bad Religion; Bear's Den; Biffy Clyro; Billy Talent; Birdy; Breaking Benjamin; Cashmere Cat; Chef'Special; Courteeners; Crystal Fighters; Danny Brown; De Staat; Dimitri Vegas & Like Mike; DJ Shadow; Dubioza Kolektiv; Flume; Fritz Kalkbrenner; George Ezra; GTA; GusGus; HVOB; Interpol; Jagwar Ma; Jamie Cullum; Kasabian; Kensington; Léon; Mac DeMarco; Macklemore & Ryan Lewis; Major Lazer; Mando Diao; Marteria; Metronomy; Nothing But Thieves; Oh Wonder; P J Harvey; Pink; Punnany Massif(hu); Quimby; Rone; Rudimental; The Chainsmokers; The Kills; The Naked and Famous; The Pretty Reckless; The Strypes; The Vaccines; Tom Odell; Two Door Cinema Club; Tycho; Valentino Khan; Vince Staples; Watsky; Weval; White Lies; Wiz Khalifa
2018	Sziget Festival 2018	565,000	Above & Beyond; Arctic Monkeys; Bastille; Blossoms; Bonobo; Borgore; Cigarettes After Sex; Clean Bandit; Dua Lipa; Fever Ray; Fran Palermo; Gogol Bordello; Gorillaz; Kendrick Lamar; King Gizzard & the Lizard Wizard; Kygo; Lana Del Rey; Liam Gallagher; Little Big; Little Dragon; Milky Chance; Mumford & Sons; Parov Stelar; Shawn Mendes; Sofi Tukker; The Kooks; The War on Drugs; Wolf Alice
2019	Sziget Festival 2019	530,000	Ed Sheeran; Foo Fighters; Post Malone; Florence and the Machine; Martin Garrix; The 1975; twenty one pilots; James Blake; Macklemore; Michael Kiwanuka; 6LACK; The National; Tove Lo; Jain; Franz Ferdinand; Mura Masa; Tom Odell; Years & Years; Catfish and the Bottlemen; Honne
2020	cancelled due to the coronavirus pandemic		
2021	cancelled due to the coronavirus pandemic		
2022	Sziget Festival 2022	452,000	Dua Lipa; Stromae; Arctic Monkeys; Kings of Leon; Tame Impala; Lewis Capaldi; Justin Bieber; Steve Aoki; Alan Walker; Nina Kraviz; Sam Fender; Kensington; Dirtyphonics; Apashe; Remi Wolf; Milky Chance; Rilès; Anne-Marie; Rüfüs Du Sol; Snax; Yung Lean; Woodkid; FKJ
2023	Sziget Festival 2023	420,000	Billie Eilish; David Guetta; M83; Florence and the Machine; Imagine Dragons; Yungblud; Arlo Parks; Mumford & Sons; Lorde; Macklemore; Yung Lean; Caroline Polachek; Girl in Red; Sam Fender; Foals; Son Mieux; Easy Life; Azahriah; Carson Coma
2024	Sziget Festival 2024	400,000	Kylie Minogue; Sam Smith; Liam Gallagher; Martin Garrix; Halsey; Janelle Monáe; Fred Again; Stormzy; Skrillex; Bebe Rexha; Louis Tomlinson; Raye; Fisher; Tom Odell; Joker Out; Yves Tumor; Becky Hill; Azahriah; Margaret Island
2025	Sziget Festival 2025	416,000	Chappell Roan; Post Malone; Kid Cudi; Anyma; Charli XCX; Shawn Mendes; Nelly Furtado; FKA Twigs; The Kooks; Little Simz; The Last Dinner Party; Rilès; Sevdaliza; Alessi Rose; Portugal. The Man; Isabel LaRosa; Kiss of Life; Luvcat; Ocean Alley; The Beaches; The Joy; Papa Roach
2026	Sziget Festival 2026	360,000	Twenty One Pilots; Sombr; Wolf Alice; Florence and the Machine; Bring Me the Horizon; Skrillex; Zara Larsson; Lewis Capaldi; Skepta; Natasha Bedingfield; Biffy Clyro; Paris Paloma; Underworld; Loyle Carner; Giant Rooks; Sigrid

== Other activities ==
In addition to music, the festival offers a plethora of other activities including cinema, dance, theatre, tattooing, Internet access, volleyball, tennis, football, indoor rowing, rock climbing, bungee jumping and a life-sized foosball.

The island is located in the city of Budapest allowing trips to the city centre during the day.

== See also ==
- List of historic rock festivals
- Woodstock
- "Magyar Sziget" (Hungarian Island), a far-right "artistic reply" to Sziget Festival was held at Verőce (Hungary) and later at different locations, between 2001 and 2022.
