= András Lovasi =

Hungarian musician (born 1967)

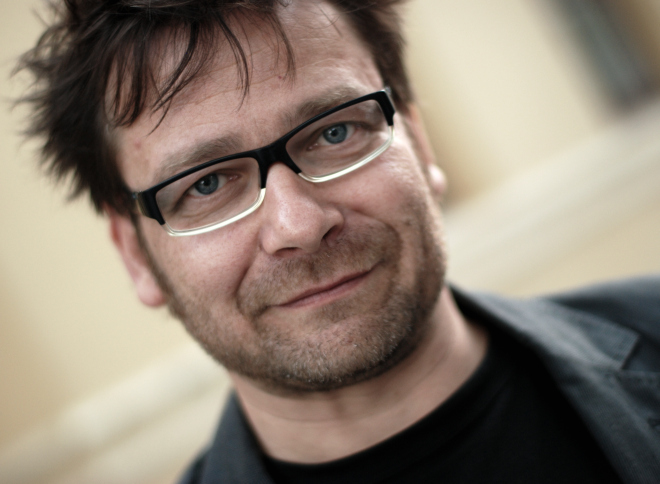
- Lovasi in May 2010

Background information
- Born: 20 June 1967 (age 59); Pécs, Hungary
- Genre: Alternative rock
- Occupations: Musician; singer-songwriter
- Instruments: Vocals; guitar; bass guitar
- Years active: 1980–present

András Lovasi (born 20 June 1967) is a Hungarian singer, songwriter and musician. He was the lead singer of alternative rock group Kispál és a Borz from 1987 to 2010. Currently, he is the lead vocalist of Kiscsillag.

In 2008, he co-founded the annual Fishing on Orfű music festival. In March 2010, Lovasi received the Kossuth Prize, the most prestigious cultural award in Hungary.

== Early life ==
Lovasi was born in Pécs. From 1984, he studied geography at the University of Pécs until 1987 when he was kicked out of the university.

== Career ==
Lovasi first started playing music in 1980 in the bands Déjá vu and Piros Ló, with limited success. Having already played together with Gábor Bräutigam in these bands, he was then joined by András Kispál and Rezső Ózdi to form Kispál és a Borz in 1987. He released ten full-length studio albums with the band from 1991 to 2004. Kispál és a Borz officially disbanded in 2010.

Lovasi released his debut solo album, Bandi a hegyről in 2001. The album also featured Kispál és a Borz's other members and Gábor Leskovics of Pál Utcai Fiúk. His second solo album, Tűzijáték délben was released in 2019.

Lovasi started Kiscsillag in 2005 with Gábor Bräutigam and Rezső Ózdi (both formerly of Kispál és a Borz), as well as Gábor Leskovics of Pál Utcai Fiúk. The band immediately became Lovasi's priority as Kispál és a Borz were put on the back burner and eventually disbanded. Kiscsillag have released five studio albums as of 2019.

Lovasi received the eMeRTon Prize for Kispál és a Borz's Sika, kasza, léc in 1994 and the Hungarian Music Awards for Kiscsillag's Néniket a bácsiknak! in 2012. In 2010, he received the Kossuth Prize, the most prestigious cultural award in Hungary.

== Personal life ==
Lovasi married actress Eszter Földes in 2015. He has two daughters from his previous marriage, Dóra and Eszter. His son, Álmos Fülöp was born in 2018.

He stood in the 2009 European Parliament election, placing 16th on the joint list of Politics Can Be Different and Humanist Party. The parties failed to receive a place in the European Parliament.

In 2019, Lovasi was criticised by several left-wing publicists for his decision to play at Tusványos, an event closely associated with the Fidesz political party.

== Discography ==
Solo

- Bandi a hegyről (2001)
- Tűzijáték délben (2019)

Kispál és a Borz

- Naphoz Holddal (1991)
- Föld kaland ilyesmi… (1992)
- Ágy, asztal, tévé (1993)
- Sika, kasza, léc (1994)
- Ül (1996)
- Bálnák, ki a partra (1997)
- Holdfényexpressz (1998)
- Velőrózsák (2000)
- Turisták bárhol (2003)
- Én, szeretlek, téged (2004)

Kiscsillag

- Greatest Hits Vol. 01. (2006)
- Örökre szívembe zártalak (2009)
- Néniket a bácsiknak! (2011)
- Szeles (2014)
- Semmi konferencia (2017)
