= Tamás Szén Molnár =

Hungarian interior designer and architect

Tamas Szen Molnar
- Born: Tamás Szén Molnár; 1970 (age 55–56); Budapest

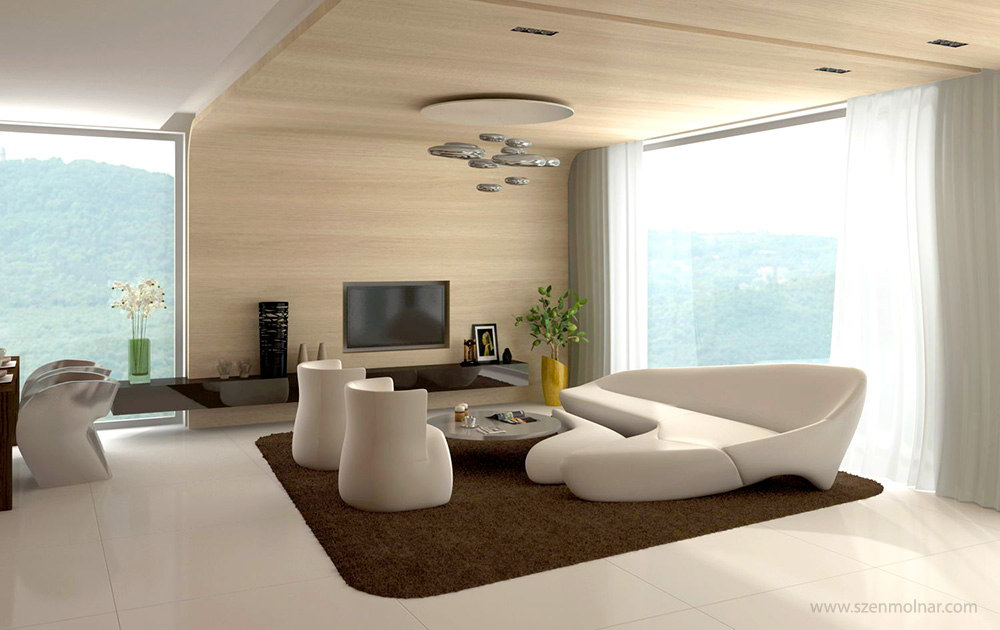
An apartment in Budapest designed by Molner

Tamás Szén Molnár (born 1970, in Budapest) is a Hungarian interior designer and architect.

== Professional life ==
Between 1988 and 2000 he was primarily active as a musician; he played the saxophone in Quimby and other bands while also participating as a 3D visualizer and animator in contemporary art projects such as Vákuum TV and Supergroup. He was also making bespoke furniture for orderers. In 2000 his attention completely shifted towards interior design, and he started to work in the atelier of Dóra Fónagy. After 2001 he continued working as a freelance designer and 3D graphic designer. He was a student of the University of West Hungary majoring in architecture and interior design. In 2006 he founded his interior design firm, Cadden Studio Kft. in Budapest which continues operation till date. After 2009 he started working with architect István Bényei.

Selected albums he contributed to: A Sip of Story, 1993, Quimby; Jerrycan Dance, 1995, Quimby; Majom-tangó, 1996, Quimby; diligramm, 1997, Quimby; Ékszerelmére, 1999, Quimby

== Important works ==
- 2002 and 2006: Quality & Design furniture store, Budapest
- 2002–2012 exhibition stands for various companies; among them Pfizer, Siemens, Honda Motors, Land Rover, Scania, Schrack, Zalakerámia, etc.
- 2004 Till Attila's flat
- After 2009 in collaboration with István Bényei several residential houses, private apartments, offices from Germany through Hungary to Sydney.
- Designed toy stores for Liliput toy country: 2009 Eger, 2011 MOM-park, 2012 Szeged Árkád shopping mall
- Hoya Training Center, Budapest, 2011
- Auchan department store customer service counter system, 2011
- Deutsche Bank, executive offices, 2012
- more than 150 other offices

== Group exhibitions ==
- 3D animation in Till Attila's movie, Média Plaza, short film, 12 minutes, shown in Műcsarnok in 2001,
- Salone Satellite, Milano 2004,
- sculptures, Sopron, Torony galéria, 2006.
- MAOE, children's toy exhibition, Olof Palme house, Budapest 2008.
- Szórakaténusz Játékmúzeum és Műhely (Szórakaténusz Toy Museum and Workshop), children's toy exhibition, Kecskemét, 2009

== Prizes ==
2004 – 2nd place in the competition of the Studio of Young Designers’ Association for redesigning underpasses in Budapest; special prize of Studio Metropolitana Urban Research Center. Shared work with Anikó Szövényi.
