= Glastonbury Festival 2013 =

Music festival in England

- Date: 28 June 2013 – 30 June 2013
- Locations: Worthy Farm, Pilton, Somerset, England
- Previous event: Glastonbury Festival 2011
- Next event: Glastonbury Festival 2014
- Participants: 135,000 tickets + performers and crew
- Website: www.glastonburyfestivals.co.uk

The 2013 Glastonbury Festival (Glastonbury Festival of Contemporary Performing Arts) was held from 28 to 30 June 2013. It followed a fallow year, in which there was no festival.

== Ticket sales ==
On 20 June 2012 it was announced that tickets for the 2013 festival would go on sale at 9 am on Sunday 7 October 2012. All 135,000 tickets were sold in a record 1 hour and 40 minutes.

== 2013 line-up ==
The Arctic Monkeys headlined on the Pyramid Stage on the Friday night. The Rolling Stones made their Glastonbury debut, headlining on the Saturday. The band played twenty songs during their two-hour set, with the second hour broadcast by BBC Two. The Rolling Stones performance had a peak audience of 2.6 million on BBC 2. Mumford & Sons closed the festival with their first ever headline set on the Pyramid stage.

| Artist/Band | Day | Stage | Time |
|---|---|---|---|
| Arctic Monkeys | Friday | Pyramid Stage | 22:15-23:45 |
| Dizzee Rascal | Friday | Pyramid Stage | 20:15-21:30 |
| The Vaccines | Friday | Pyramid Stage | 18:30-19:30 |
| Professor Green | Friday | Pyramid Stage | 17:00-18:00 |
| Rita Ora | Friday | Pyramid Stage | 15:30-16:30 |
| Jake Bugg | Friday | Pyramid Stage | 14:00-15:00 |
| Haim | Friday | Pyramid Stage | 12:30-13:30 |
| Jupiter & Okwess International | Friday | Pyramid Stage | 11:00-12:00 |
| The Rolling Stones | Saturday | Pyramid Stage | 21:30-23:45 |
| Primal Scream | Saturday | Pyramid Stage | 19:00-20:00 |
| Elvis Costello | Saturday | Pyramid Stage | 17:15-18:30 |
| Ben Howard | Saturday | Pyramid Stage | 15:30-16:30 |
| Laura Mvula | Saturday | Pyramid Stage | 14:00-14:45 |
| Billy Bragg | Saturday | Pyramid Stage | 12:30-13:30 |
| Rokia Traoré | Saturday | Pyramid Stage | 11:00-12:00 |
| Mumford & Sons | Sunday | Pyramid Stage | 21:45-23:15 |
| Nick Cave and the Bad Seeds | Sunday | Pyramid Stage | 19:45-21:00 |
| Vampire Weekend | Sunday | Pyramid Stage | 18:00-19:00 |
| Kenny Rogers | Sunday | Pyramid Stage | 15:45-17:00 |
| Rufus Wainwright | Sunday | Pyramid Stage | 14:00-15:00 |
| First Aid Kit | Sunday | Pyramid Stage | 12:45-13:30 |
| Bassekou Kouyate | Sunday | Pyramid Stage | 11:30-12:15 |
| Portishead | Friday | Other Stage | 22:30-23:45 |
| Foals | Friday | Other Stage | 21:00-22:00 |
| Alt-J | Friday | Other Stage | 19:30-20:30 |
| Tame Impala | Friday | Other Stage | 18:05-19:00 |
| The Lumineers | Friday | Other Stage | 16:35-17:35 |
| Enter Shikari | Friday | Other Stage | 15:15-16:05 |
| Amanda Palmer | Friday | Other Stage | 13:50-14:45 |
| The Hives | Friday | Other Stage | 12:25-13:20 |
| Beady Eye | Friday | Other Stage | 11:00-11:55 |
| Chase & Status | Saturday | Other Stage | 22:30-23:45 |
| Example | Saturday | Other Stage | 21:00-22:00 |
| Two Door Cinema Club | Saturday | Other Stage | 19:30-20:30 |
| Alabama Shakes | Saturday | Other Stage | 18:00-19:00 |
| Noah and the Whale | Saturday | Other Stage | 16:30-17:30 |
| Azealia Banks | Saturday | Other Stage | 15:00-16:00 |
| Dry the River | Saturday | Other Stage | 13:40-14:30 |
| The 1975 | Saturday | Other Stage | 12:30-13:10 |
| The Staves | Saturday | Other Stage | 11:30-12:10 |
| The xx | Sunday | Other Stage | 22:05-23:15 |
| The Smashing Pumpkins | Sunday | Other Stage | 20:25-21:35 |
| Editors | Sunday | Other Stage | 18:50-19:50 |
| Of Monsters and Men | Sunday | Other Stage | 17:30-18:20 |
| Public Image Ltd | Sunday | Other Stage | 16:10-17:00 |
| I Am Kloot | Sunday | Other Stage | 14:50-15:40 |
| Stornoway | Sunday | Other Stage | 13:30-14:10 |
| The Heavy | Sunday | Other Stage | 12:10-13:00 |
| Zulu Winter | Sunday | Other Stage | 11:00-11:40 |
| Chic featuring Nile Rodgers | Friday | West Holts Stage | 22:15-23:45 |
| Seasick Steve | Friday | West Holts Stage | 20:30-21:30 |
| Tom Tom Club | Friday | West Holts Stage | 19:00-20:00 |
| Toro y Moi | Friday | West Holts Stage | 17:30-18:30 |
| Alice Russell | Friday | West Holts Stage | 16:00-17:00 |
| Goat | Friday | West Holts Stage | 14:30-15:30 |
| Zun Zun Egui | Friday | West Holts Stage | 13:00-14:00 |
| Classica Orchestra Afrobeat | Friday | West Holts Stage | 11:30-12:30 |
| Public Enemy | Saturday | West Holts Stage | 22:15-23:35 |
| Major Lazer | Saturday | West Holts Stage | 20:45-21:45 |
| Maverick Sabre | Saturday | West Holts Stage | 19:15-20:15 |
| The Orb feat. Kakat Sit Si | Saturday | West Holts Stage | 17:45-18:45 |
| BadBadNotGood | Saturday | West Holts Stage | 16:15-17:15 |
| The Bombay Royale | Saturday | West Holts Stage | 14:45-15:45 |
| Fatoumata Diawara | Saturday | West Holts Stage | 13:15-14:15 |
| Troker | Saturday | West Holts Stage | 12:00-12:45 |
| Bobby Womack | Sunday | West Holts Stage | 21:30-23:15 |
| Lianne La Havas | Sunday | West Holts Stage | 19:45-20:45 |
| Sérgio Mendes | Sunday | West Holts Stage | 18:15-19:15 |
| Ondatropica | Sunday | West Holts Stage | 16:45-17:45 |
| The Congos | Sunday | West Holts Stage | 15:25-16:15 |
| Dub Colossus | Sunday | West Holts Stage | 14:05-14:55 |
| Matthew E. White | Sunday | West Holts Stage | 12:35-13:35 |
| Riot Jazz | Sunday | West Holts Stage | 11:30-12:15 |

On 17 January 2013 it was announced that on each day, in an act of solidarity, musicians from Mali would open the Pyramid Stage. Islamists have banned music in the North of the North African nation. The first musician announced to open the Pyramid Stage was Rokia Traoré.

Rodriguez, the Detroit pop star at the center of the Oscar-nominated documentary Searching for Sugar Man, will perform at Glastonbury Festival

The London-based indie group The Vaccines announced on their Facebook page that they would be playing the Pyramid Stage on the Friday. The lineup was announced on 27 March at 7pm on the Glastonbury website and on the Zane Lowe radio show on BBC Radio 1.

Beady Eye opened the festival with a surprise unadvertised performance on Friday at 11 am.

=== Unconfirmed dates ===
The Park Stage

- Cat Power
- The Horrors
- Django Django
- Rodriguez
- Dinosaur Jr.
- Trop Belle. and more

The John Peel Stage

- Crystal Castles
- Hurts
- Phoenix
- Everything Everything
- The Courteeners
- Prāta vētra and more
- Miles Kane

BBC Introducing

- Turrentine Jones
- Rizzle Kicks
- Gabrielle Aplin

Avalon Stage

- Josh Doyle
- Newton Faulkner
