= Turrentine Jones =

- Turrentine Jones performing at Sziget Festival in Budapest on 16 August 2015

Background information
- Origin: Manchester, United Kingdom
- Genres: Indie rock; blues rock; rock and roll
- Years active: 2012–2016
- Members: Julian Neville; Joe Chilstone-Vause; Rich Watts
- Website: www.facebook.com/TurrentineJones

Turrentine Jones were an English indie rock band formed in 2012 in Manchester, UK. The band consisted of Julian Neville (guitar/vocals), Joe Chilstone-Vause (bass) and Rich Watts (drums/backing vocals). They released one studio album: Our Days (2014) and one live album Live in York (2015) as well as two singles.

The band cited Booker T. & the MG's, The Mar-Keys and the Rolling Stones as influences.

The band were labelled a "Future Classic" and described as "infectious blues-rock" by national radio station, Real Radio XS and proclaimed by Hattie Pearson of XFM to be "one of Manchester’s finest exports in recent times".

All the music and lyrics for Turrentine Jones' songs were written by the band's frontman Julian Neville.

Turrentine Jones last performance was at Kendal Calling in July, 2016.

== History ==
=== Early years (2011–2012) ===
After several line-up changes, demo releases low-key gigs in London and Manchester, Turrentine Jones officially settled on a line-up in 2012 which consisted of Julian Neville, Thomas Scotson and Rich Watts.

The band's debut single Le Debut was released on 19 February 2012 which included the tracks "Slam the Door" and "Candy Snake". The single "Slam the Door" picked up two awards at the Exposure Music Awards in London for Best Male Act and Best Blues Act in October 2012. The band released a further two singles "Show Me Mercy" and "Della May".

=== BBC Introducing, Glastonbury Festival (2013) ===
Turrentine Jones performing live at Glastonbury in 2013

In 2013 the band performed on the BBC Introducing stage at Glastonbury Festival, one of the largest UK festivals, and were the third most shared act of the day on the BBC website, eclipsing the Rolling Stones. The Telegraph's Rupert Hawksley and Florence Waters highlighted the buzz surrounding the group during their coverage of the festival. During their performance of the song "Slam the Door," Rich Watts wore the optical head-mounted Google Glass. According to The Guardian's Jemima Kiss, the band became the first to perform on stage using this new technology.

=== Our Days, Rough Trade, XFM (2013–2014) ===
Shortly after performing at Glastonbury Festival, the band signed a publishing deal with Rough Trade and began recording their debut LP in January 2014. The album, Our Days, was produced by Chris Hamilton and recorded at Cottonmouth Studios, an analogue studio in Salford. It was released on 11 August 2014.

During an interview in February 2013 Neville described Turrentine Jones as a study in contrasts:

"I consider myself gruff and guardedly wry, while Rich Watts (drummer) is more voluble and outwardly enthusiastic. Thomas Scotson (Hammond organ) is from Finland... we're all from different countries actually." – Julian Neville

The album received instant praise with their debut single, "Moonlight is On Yer Side" debuting on BBC Introducing and was hailed a "magnificent debut.." by Natalie-Eve Williams. The single featured in a television advertisement for Etnies in the United States. In the UK, the single received airplay on over 40 regional and national radio stations.

In November, Turrentine Jones were XFMs 'Band of the Month', featuring regularly on the Evening Show with Danielle Perry.

=== Real Radio XS, Love Heard You Coming, Dot to Dot, Tramlines, Sziget Festival (2015) ===
Turrentine Jones performing at Sziget in Budapest in 2015

Following on from the release of their debut album, Turrentine Jones were labelled a "Future Classic" by Real Radio XS and went on to perform at Future Classics Live, an official show of the national radio station to "see the talent of tomorrow before they hit the big time". Their performance was brought to the attention of Marc Carey, European Director of Hard Rock Cafe, who would later invite the band to perform on the Hard Rock Cafe stage at Isle of Wight Festival the following year.

Turrentine Jones performed at a number of popular festivals across the UK including Dot To Dot Festival in both Manchester and Nottingham, Tramlines Festival and Monmouth Music Festival. On 16 August 2015 the band performed at Sziget Festival in Budapest, Europe’s largest music festival. It was the band's first appearance outside of the UK. The band received an overwhelming majority of votes (3657) during a competition run by one of the festival's official partners; beating 300 bands across Europe to first place.

On 19 November 2015, Turrentine Jones released their second single and accompanying music video for the single, "Love Heard You Coming," from the debut album Our Days. The music video featured notable UK radio presenters Loz Guest (Kerrang! Radio/Planet Rock), Sarah Champion (Absolute Radio), Vicki Blight (Absolute Radio), Johnny Doom (Kerrang! Radio), Jake Thomson (Kerrang! Radio), Tim Cocker (XFM). In addition, the music video also featured Ben Batt (Shameless, The Go Between) and Rebecca Atkinson (Shameless) respectively.

=== Dot to Dot, Isle of Wight Festival, Kendal Calling (2016) ===
Turrentine Jones performing on the Hard Rock Cafe stage at Isle of Wight Festival on 12 June 2016

On 19 January 2016, Turrentine Jones announced their intent to collaborate with fans on their second studio album with a release date expected early 2017.

On 8 February 2016, Isle of Wight Festival announced Turrentine Jones would be closing the Hard Rock Cafe stage on 12 June to perform alongside idols The Who and Queen. This followed with the announcement the band would also be making their first appearance at Kendal Calling, to perform on the Woodland stage on 28 July 2016.

On 12 June 2016, Turrentine Jones closed the Hard Rock Cafe stage at Isle of Wight Festival.

In January 2017, Julian Neville told BBC's 6 Music in a radio interview the band were "taking a break after a hectic touring schedule over the past 12 months but planned to return with a new EP that promised to be worth the wait."

Turrentine Jones last performance would ultimately be at Kendal Calling in July, 2016. A second studio album was never released.

==== Band name ====
Julian Neville explains that the name Turrentine Jones came from "fictional names like Quentin Turrentine and Stanley Jones" (parodies of Quentin Tarantino and Brian Jones, respectively) made up by their friends. When the band came up with "Turrentine Jones", Neville wrote it down.

According to a BBC interview: "Neville and the band were cagey about what the name of the act means, and each live interview was an opportunity to dress it up however they felt at the time."

== Endorsement ==
Turrentine Jones are endorsed by Rotosound, Peavey and Cornell boutique valve amplifiers.

== Band members ==
Current members

- Julian Neville – lead and backing vocals, guitar (2010–present)
- Joe Chilstone-Vause – Bass (2015–present)
- Rich Watts – drums, backing vocals, percussion (2012–present)

Touring members

- Thomas Scotson – Hammond organ, keyboard, trumpet (2010–present)
- Jaki Chapman – Saxophone (2016–present)

Former members

- Chris Carcamo – drums (2010–2012)

=== Julian Neville ===
Julian Neville
- Born: Julian Neville; 14 May 1985 (age 41); Waratah, Newcastle, Australia
- Genres: Indie rock, psychedelic rock, garage rock, rock and roll
- Occupations: Musician, singer, songwriter
- Instruments: Vocals, guitar, percussion
- Years active: 2000–present
- Member of: Turrentine Jones

Julian Neville (born 14 May 1985) is an Australian recording artist, singer and songwriter. He is the lead vocalist, guitarist, and principal songwriter of Turrentine Jones.

Neville was born in Waratah, a suburb of Newcastle in Australia and raised in Gloucester, a small rural town in New South Wales. He attended Gloucester High School (1997–2003) and was later described by his Music teacher, Andrew Scully, as "someone quick to learn, with a natural ear to pick up a guitar and play what he heard. Neville was never particularly vocal, but you could sense when pieces of music moved him."

Neville spent most of his early childhood years listening to soul and early rock and roll citing Booker T & The MG's and The Animals as early influences. Neville turned his attentions to guitar music following the breakthrough of grunge in the 90's. Neville's mother gave him a classical guitar for his birthday when he was 6–7 years old and he began learning.

In 2008, Neville left Australia for England having revealed becoming jaded with the local music scene at a young age where he had performed alongside several notable artists including David Knopfler of Dire Straits and Colin Hay of Men at Work. In his own words: "I gave myself too many distractions and felt I wasn't getting anywhere – Just blasting and laughing my way through the time. It was great. I had fun. But I needed a release". – Julian Neville.

Neville moved from Australia to the United Kingdom in 2009, where he had performed as a solo acoustic singer-songwriter supporting the likes of David Knopfler of Dire Straits and Colin Hay of Men at Work.

Neville's songwriting with Turrentine Jones has been described often as sultry and darkly-sensual, which he matches with wit, warmth and a spoonful or two of suggestion in his lyrics. This is particularly highlighted on the band's first two single releases Le Début and Show Me Mercy.

== Equipment ==
=== Guitars ===
- Fender Telecaster
- Fender Jazzmaster – Used on "Della May"
- Fender Bronco – Used on "Candy Snake"
- Gibson Les Paul Custom
- Cole Clark FL2AC
- Taylor 414CE

== Discography ==
=== Studio albums ===
- Our Days (2014)

Live albums

- Live in York (2015)

=== Singles ===
- "Moonlight Is On Yer Side" (2014, re-released in 2015)
- "Love Heard You Coming" (2015)
