= Grimus (band) =

Romanian alternative rock band

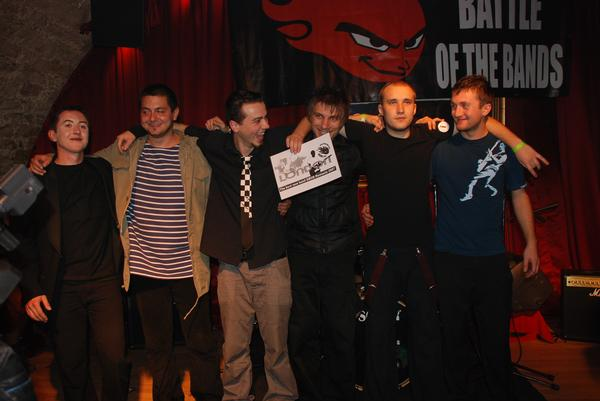
- Grimus represents Romania at the Global Battle of the Bands 2007 in London

Background information
- Origin: Cluj-Napoca, Transylvania, Romania
- Genre: Alternative rock • indie rock
- Years active: 2005 – present
- Labels: Cramps Records, A&A Records, Music In Space
- Members: Bogdan Mezofi (Vocals); Valentin Rauca (Guitar); Cristian Csapo (Guitar); Titus Vădan (Bass); Turi Gabor-Peter (Drums); Lehel Kiss (Keyboard)
- Past members: Tamás Adorjáni (Drums)
- Website: Grimus.ro

Grimus is an alternative rock band from Cluj-Napoca, Romania.

== History ==
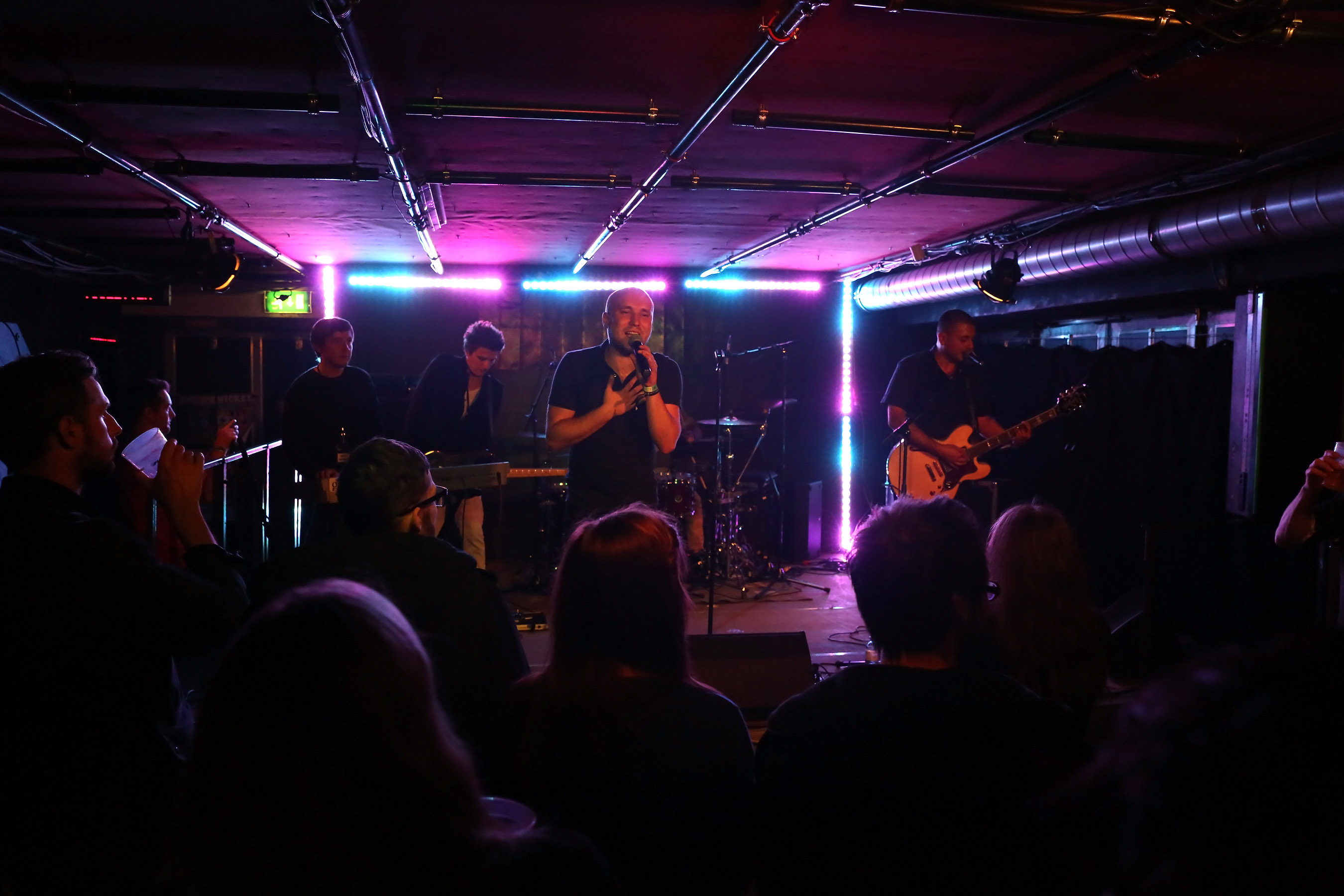
Grimus performing at Waves Vienna 2013

While studying in Cluj-Napoca, the members started out as the 5-piece rock band Revers. In 2006, after having suffered multiple changes in the lineup, Grimus released a demo album. Their song Solitude is declared Song of the Year 2006 by City FM Radio. By 2007 the band received invitations to play at most music festivals in Romania. They take their name from Salman Rushdie's 1975 novel Grimus.

In October 2007, Grimus won the National Finals of the Global Battle of the Bands and represented Romania in the World Finals, releasing their debut album Panikon in 2008. The band then went on to work with British producer Adam Whittaker on the critically acclaimed follow-up "Egretta" for A&A Records and the subsequent "Emergence". The band's most recent release came in 2018.

== Discography ==
=== Albums ===
- Panikon (2008)
- Egretta (2011)
- Emergence (2014)
- Unmanageable Species (2018)
- Abandonic (2022)
- Spre lumi neumblate (2025)

=== Demos and singles ===
- Demo (2006)
- Umbre (2010)
- Started (2010)
- Face the Light (2011)
- In Your Eyes (2012)
- High (2013)
- The Hell I'm In (2014)
- Selfie (2014)
- Ultima Oara (2015)
- Vom Lupta (2016)
- Culoare (with Alexandra Ungureanu) (2016)
- Fregate (2017)
- Departe de lume (with Dan Byron) (2017)
- Carelessly (2018)
- Piblokto (2018)
- Apatrizi (2021)
- Albie (2021)
- Exceptie (with Ana Coman) (2021)
- Soarele (Rasare si singur) (2022)
- Stoluri (2025)
- Intuneric 2 (with Ada Morar) (2025)
- Ani (with Raul Stan) (2025)
