= 08001 =

World music project based in Barcelona

08001 is a world music project based in Barcelona.

This project, conceived as a workshop or work in progress, is a collective of musicians from different parts of the world based in El Raval, the most ethnically diverse neighbourhood of Barcelona. "08001" is El Raval's postal code.

Its live shows blend the performance of numerous artists together with a visual screen show. 08001 made its debut during Sónar, a music festival in Barcelona. Right after, they embarked on an tournee around Spain and various parts of Europe.

In 2004, Time magazine wrote of 08001: "In recent years, as El Raval has been colonized by migrants from as far afield as South America and Southeast Asia, the urban music that reverberates from this neighborhood has evolved to reflect the diversity of the population. This syncretic sound — called mestizaje, a mix of music and ethnicities — is now producing some of the country's hottest new acts. And they don't come any hotter than Barcelona's 08001."

They also received the Impala award after selling over 30.000 units of their independently released first record Raval ta joie (play on words with their neighbourhood El Raval and colloquial French expression "ravale ta joie" translated as "swallow your joy" meaning something like "take it easy with your joy; hold on with it, something may have happened").

Vorágine (WorkinProgress Records) is 08001's second album commercially released in June 2007.

== Discography ==
- 2003: Raval ta joie
- 2007: Vorágine
- 2015: No Pain no Gain
