= Șuie Paparude =

Romanian electronic music band

- Origin: Romania
- Genres: Electronic rock • alternative rock • electronic • breakbeat • Big beat • synth-pop • alternative dance • acid techno • drum and bass • pop rock • electropop
- Years active: 1992–present
- Labels: Cat Music
- Members: Mihai Campineanu - Music Composer; Mihai Dobre - vocal Marius Andrei Alexe (BeanMC) - vocal
- Website: suiepaparude.com

Șuie Paparude is a Romanian electronic music band. They are recognized as having a distinct sound and style, comparable with very few other local bands. As such, they were honored with multiple opening acts for internationally acclaimed bands as well as presences to high-profile music festivals, especially from Romania but also across Europe.

== Discography ==
Logo

- 1995 – Șuie Paparude
- 1997 – Salvează-te
- 1998 – Musca
- 2000 – Urban
- 2003 – Atac la persoane
- 2005 – Scandalos
- 2008 – A fost odată...
- 2010 – E suflet în aparat
- 2018 – Noul Album
