= Sarmalele Reci =

Romanian rock band

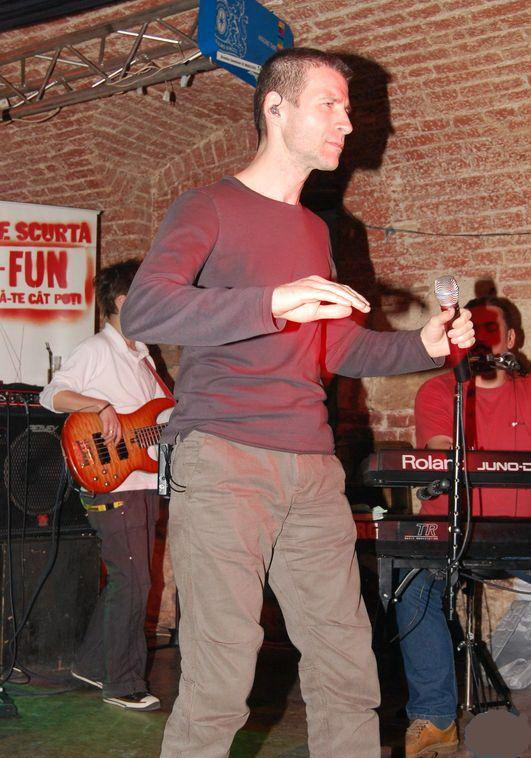
- Sarmalele Reci (2009)

Background information
- Origin: Bucharest, Romania
- Genres: Alternative rock, pop rock
- Years active: 1993–present
- Members: Zoltán András; Emil Viciu; Radu Râmniceanu; Bogdan Bereucă
- Past members: Mihai Iordache; Ciprian Voinea; Radu Râmniceanu; Lucian Maxim; Sorin Romanescu; Adrian Borţun; Vadim Tichişan; Andrei Bărbulescu; Dan Nedelcu; Andi Savastre; Adi Tetrade; Iulian Corlăţeanu; Paul Baciu; Ionel Tănase; Dan Georgescu; Gabi Drăgan; Vlady Săteanu; Alex Badea; Mircea Horvath; Ciprian Almășan
- Website: Official website

Sarmalele Reci (meaning "The Cold sarmale", [sɑrˈmɑlɛlɛ ˈrɛt͡ʃʲ]) is a Romanian rock band that was formed in 1993 in Bucharest.

== History ==
The musical group Sarmalele Reci was initially formed by Florin Dumitrescu in 1993. Dumitrescu wanted to create a rock band that will have a Romanian name, because at that time Romanian bands usually had an American-English name.

== Members ==
The band members in 1993 were:

- Zoltán András - vocal, keyboards
- Mihai Iordache - saxophone
- Emil Viciu - guitar
- Ciprian Voinea - bass guitar
- Florin Ștefan - drums
- Florin Dumitrescu - text composer

In 2010s:

- Zoltán András - vocals, keyboards, accordion
- Emil Viciu - guitars
- Radu Râmniceanu - bass
- Bogdan Bereucă - drums

== Discography ==
- 1995 - Ţara te vrea prost (The State Wants You Stupid)
- 1996 - Aurolac (Junkie)
- 1998 - Bucate alese (Chosen Foods)
- 1999 - Răpirea din Serai (The Abduction from the Seraglio)
- 2001 - Maniac
- 2003 - Vaca (The Cow)
- 2007 - Adrian Băsescu
- 2009 - O seară la Operetă (A Night at the Operetta)
- 2012 - Haos.ro (Chaos.ro)
- 2021 - Ţara te vrea prost (The State Wants You Stupid) (remake)
- 2023 - Aurolac (Junkie) (remake)
