= Kispál és a Borz =

Hungarian alternative rock band

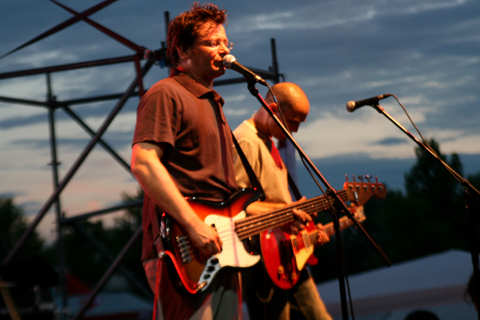
- Kispál és a Borz performing in Zamárdi in 2007

Background information
- Origin: Pécs, Hungary
- Genre: Alternative rock
- Years active: 1987–2010, 2022–present
- Labels: Polygram; Rózsa; Human Telex; Universal Music Hungary; Megadó Kiadó
- Members: András Kispál; András Lovasi; D. Ákos Dióssy; Ferenc Bajkai
- Website: www.kispalesaborz.hu

Kispál és a Borz are a Hungarian alternative rock band founded in 1987 in Pécs by András Lovasi, András Kispál, Rezső Ózdi and Gábor Bräutigam. They disbanded on 9 August 2010 after a large-scale concert at the Sziget Festival. The band reformed in 2022. They are regarded as one of the most influential alternative bands in Hungary.

== History ==
Kispál és a Borz were founded in 1987 by Gábor Bräutigam, Rezső Ózdi, András Kispál and András Lovasi. The band's name was originally supposed to be "Borz" ("Badger"), a name similar to the then-popular bands The Doors and Bros. However, Kispál complained that all of his past bands were named after animals and all of them failed, so the others decided to also highlight his name in the final version.

Ózdi left the band in 1988. The band's first demo, Tökéletes helyettes, was released in 1989. The band also started touring nationally the same year, although their first concert happened a year earlier. The band recorded their first album, Naphoz Holddal the following year, releasing it in 1991. Their following record, Föld kaland ilyesmi… was met with considerable critical and commercial success. Afterwards, the band switched labels, releasing Ágy, asztal, TV in 1993 on Rózsa Records, furthering the band's quick rise in popularity. Their fourth album, 1994's Sika, kasza, léc resulted in the band receiving the eMeRTon Prize for Best Rock Album of the Year.

1995 saw the exit of drummer Gábor Bräutigam, who was then replaced by Zoltán "Csülök" Tóth. András Lovasi later said that "it was a huge mistake that we didn't start a new band with a new name after Bräutigam left". Around this time, the band also started experimenting with acoustic concerts, including a hugely successful "unplugged" concert at the Capital Circus of Budapest in February 1996. The band also released their fifth album, Ül in 1996. The following year, Kispál és a Borz's music was featured in the film Dollybirds, resulting in a new level of commercial success for the band. They also released their sixth album, Bálnák, ki a partra in 1997.

In 1998, they released Holdfényexpressz, and two of the band's guest musicians, keyboardist Ákos Dióssy and guitarist Ferenc Vittai, officially joined Kispál és a Borz, resulting in a new, more baroque pop-like sound which was particularly apparent on 2000's Velőrózsák. This was followed by another change of the band's lineup when Michael Zwecker replaced Tóth as the band's drummer. He played on their final two studio albums, 2003's Turisták bárhol, and 2004's Én, szeretlek, téged. After two more lineup changes (Áron Bóra replacing Zwecker in 2006, and Ábel Mihalik replacing Bóra a year later), it became clear that Kispál és a Borz had lost their creative spark as critics called for them to disband. This eventually happened in 2010 when the band gave their final concert at the Sziget Festival. They have since reunited for three concerts at Lovasi's Fishing On Orfű festival in 2014, 2015 and 2016. After the 2016 concert, Lovasi claimed that he finds it unlikely that the band would reunite for any more concerts.

On 28 February 2022, the band announced its reformation on the YouTube channel Partizán. They also plan to release a new album later this year.

== Members ==
- András Kispál – solo guitar, composer (1987–2010, 2022–present)
- András Lovasi – vocals, lyrics, bass, composer (1987–2010, 2022–present)
- D. Ákos Dióssy – piano, rattler, vocals (1998–2010, 2022–present), guest (1995–1998)
- Ferenc Bajkai – drums (2022–present)

=== Former members ===
- Rezső Ózdi – bass (1987–1988)
- Gábor Bräutigam – drums (1987–1995)
- Zoltán Tóth – drums (1995–2002)
- Áron Bóra – drums (2006–2007)
- Ferenc Vittay – guitar, vocals (1998–2000), guest (1995–1998)
- Michael Zwecker – drums (2002–2006)
- Ábel Mihalik – drums (2007–2010)

== Discography ==
=== Studio albums ===
- Naphoz Holddal (1991)
- Föld kaland ilyesmi… (1992)
- Ágy, asztal, tévé (1993)
- Sika, kasza, léc (1994)
- Ül (1996)
- Bálnák, ki a partra (1997)
- Happy Borzday (1997)
- Holdfényexpressz (1998)
- Velőrózsák (2000)
- Turisták bárhol (2003)
- Én, szeretlek, téged (2004)
- Beszorult mondat (2023)

=== Compilation albums ===
- A lefgelső polcról, a fiók mélyéről (1998-2009)

=== Extended plays ===
- Fák virágok fény (1995)
- Kicsit (1997)
- Tesis a világ (1998)
- Az nem lehet soha (2000)
- Hang és fény (2000)
- Nagyon szerelmes lányok (2002)
