= Quimby (band) =

Hungarian musical group

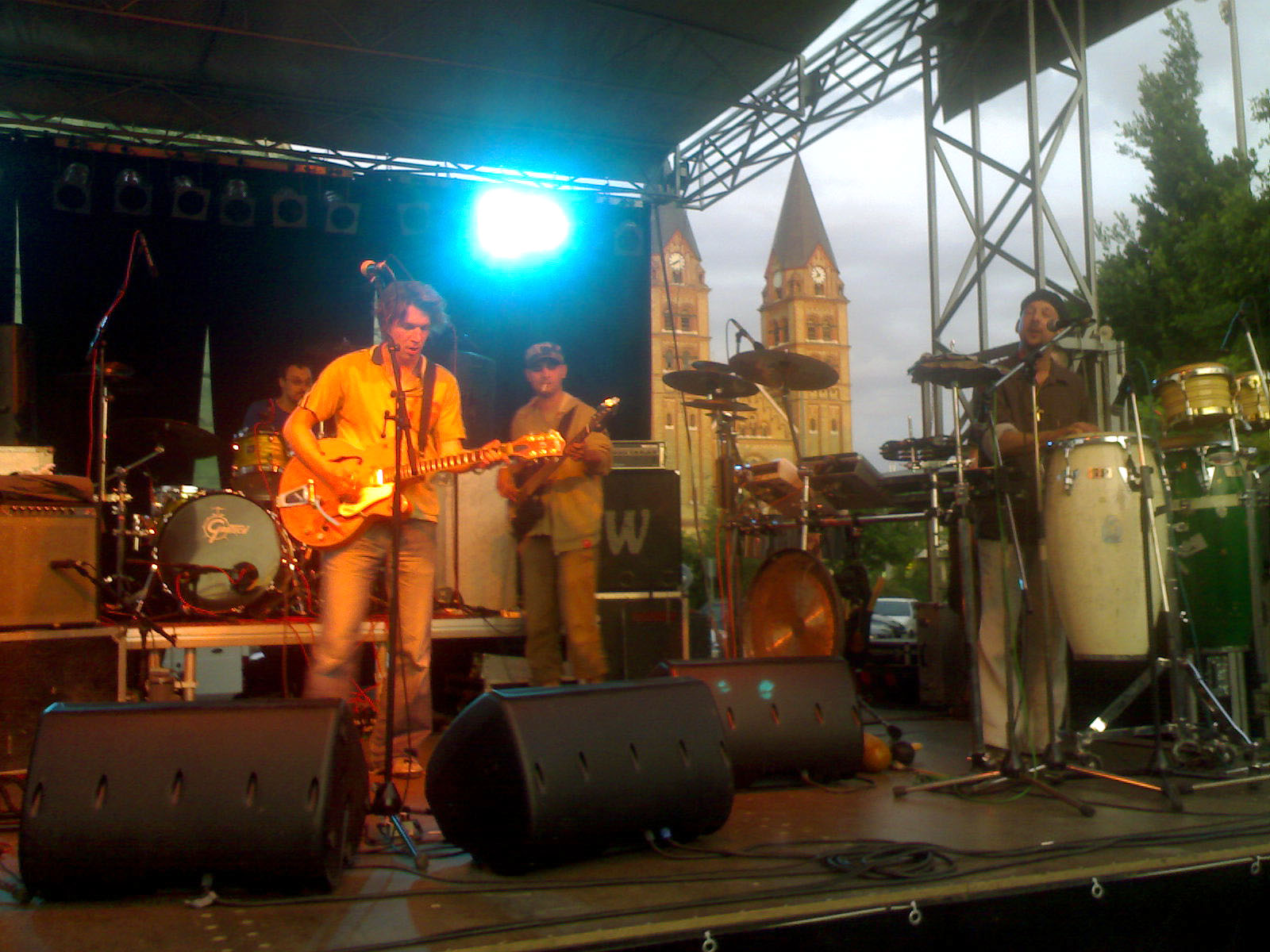
- Quimby in concert at Nyíregyháza

Background information
- Origin: Dunaújváros, Hungary
- Genres: Alternative rock; Experimental rock; Jazz fusion
- Years active: 1991–present
- Members: Tibor Kiss – Vocals, Lead guitar Livius Varga – Vocals, Percussions; Szilárd Balanyi – Keyboards, Vocals; Ferenc Gerdesits – Drums; Ferenc Mikuli – Bass; József Kárpáti – Trumpet
- Past members: Endre Kiss – Rhythm guitar 1991–1994; Tamás Szén Molnár – Saxophone 1991–1999; Ákos Medve – Drums 1991–1996
- Website: quimby.hu

Quimby is an alternative rock band popular on the Hungarian music scene. Enjoying large crowds across the nation, they have had successes at music festivals such as the Sziget Festival. Together for over 25 years, the band has a large collection of studio albums and one live CD/DVD combo to their credit.

== Band history ==
=== Roots ===
The band originated in the industrial town of Dunaújváros under the name 'Október', playing covers. By the end of high school, the band dispersed. The Kiss brothers, Tibor and Endre, got another group together in 1991, and renamed it 'Quimby'.

=== 1991 to 1995: Saloon start – Jerrycan Dance ===
In 1992 the band's first cassette entitled Up Side Down was released, featuring English-language tunes such as "Sea", "Stink", "I Give You My Shoes", "Up Side Down", "Never Get By" and "Policeman". The band's style was compared to the chansons and cabaret songs from the period between the World Wars. The band played at pubs in Pest. By 1993 the personnel consisted of Tibor Kiss (vocals and guitar), Endre Kiss (guitar), Livius Varga (percussion and vocals), Tamás Szén Molnár (saxophone), Ferenc Mikuli (bass guitar), and Ákos Medve (drums). In 1993 they recorded their second album, Sip of Story. This album also came out on cassette and had English lyrics. During this period the band was one of the most successful club bands in Budapest, and also popular on the college and festival circuit.

At this point the elder Kiss brother, Endre, left the band. He was replaced by a young piano player, Szilárd Balanyi, who was born in Balatonfüred. With this new line-up the band recorded its next album, Jerrycan Dance, which came out on CD but in a limited edition. This album is also in English and it begins to show some of the main characteristics which are seen in the present band.

=== 1995 to 1997: Language change – Majom-tangó ===
In 1995, the band decided to focus more on writing songs in Hungarian. By the summer of 1996 the new album was finished: Majom-tangó (Monkey Tango). This album contains mostly Hungarian songs, but there are three English ones. The album has an eclectic style: there are several folk songs featured in the usual chanson-epic style of Quimby, especially Roma and Latin folk music; then reggae and psychedelic effects are incorporated. Majom-tangó is the direct antecedent of their present style.

=== 1997 to 1999: Breakthrough – Diligram ===
The release of Majom-tangó immediately led to a rise in popularity on the Hungarian music scene. The band moved from being a phenomenon on the alternative stage to wider popularity with the appearance of Diligramm (Loonygramme) in December 1997. Diligramm is a complete work of a mature band. The lyrics are crisper, the musical palette more colorful; the band found its own style. The CD was introduced by a video and single, "Once There Was a Time", and by a memorable CD release concert. Quimby enjoyed many successes in their live performances, with more concerts in front of larger audiences. In the spring of 1998 the Hungarian press chose Diligramm the album of the year.

=== 1999 to 2000: Mature band – Ékszerelmére ===
The new album Ékszerelmére was highly anticipated even before it was released in November 1999. Producing the record proved a little complex when early in the year Livius Varga lost the tape containing ideas for new songs while he was traveling on the tram in Budapest. Ékszerelmére is even more mature and composed than the previous album. The music is strict but playful, uniform but discursive, realistic but ascendent, and traditionalist. While the band uses the implementations of modern music, the lyrics are cruel and ironic; stories and verbal psychedelia are present. After the recording of Ékszerelmére the band released Tamás Molnár (saxophone). After a long search his place was filled by József Kárpáti, a trumpet and piano player from the band 'Andersen'. The band stepped on stage at that year's Sziget Festival in this form.

=== 2000 to 2002: Morzsák and Káosz Amigos ===
During this period the band performed at festival concerts in Hungary and abroad, and went on a mini-tour of Germany. In the spring of 2001 Quimby released a new album called Morzsák és Szilánkok (Crumbs and Splinters). It contained remixes featuring unknown, young, talented remixers, together with concert recordings of older songs. Singer Tibor Kiss said the album presented the material "with a sort of continuous modality, like a film, building upon each other one after the other".

In 2002, the album Káosz Amigos (Chaos Amigos) did not disappoint fans. The album takes the musical oeuvre of Quimby to a new point of view. It is a musical-lyrical adventure in a troubled, intensive, vibrating, sensitive, dynamic, tragic, humorous, often tragicomic world. This album contains 10 songs in 43 minutes. In spite of the shorter playtime the album is a colorful, exciting and amusing musical roller-coaster. The songs are memorable but not hits in the usual sense. There are Spanish-like chansons with stiff rhythms, interesting guitar work, agile and bop songs. There are also fancy, moderate, slow songs and rap, even childhood sayings. The album features percussion instruments, guitar, bass, keyboards, modern electronics and trumpet by the newest member of the band, József Kárpáti.

=== 2002 to 2004: hiatus ===
The band had just completed touring the new album in Hungary when frontman Tibor Kiss needed an extended break for rest and relaxation, so the band went on hiatus. Though it wasn't known ahead of time how long the break would be, the pause lasted until 2004. After an intensive probation period and a return concert, Quimby rejoined the Hungarian public music scene once again with enormous power. Full-house concerts were held in Budapest and other venues, along with a successful "Night Invasion" concert in Spring 2004 and appearances at the big summer festivals, including the Sziget Festival. The band continued from where they left off: reviewers and fans said the band was in good shape, perhaps even better than before.

=== 2005 to present: Kilégzés and Family Tugedör ===
The album Kilégzés (Exhalation, October 2005) became a notable work in the band's history. It is thought to have opened a new era for the band from an artistic point of view. Memories from their previous phase are presented in a new context, in a re-evaluated form.

In 2006 the band reached the 15-year milestone. Quimby celebrated this special jubilee by publishing a greatest hits recording and DVD called Family Tugedör. They also gave a double concert in the Katona József Theatre, one in the Petőfi Csarnok venue and a concert on 1 January 2007 called "Magic Music". The work continues with two releases in 2009, an EP (Ajjajjaj) and a full length album (Lármagyűjtögető).

== Discography ==
The band has released the following albums:

- 1995 – Jerrycan Dance
- 1996 – Majom-tangó
- 1997 – Diligramm
- 1999 – Ékszerelmére
- 2001 – Morzsák és Szilánkok (Live)
- 2002 – Káosz Amigos
- 2005 – Kilégzés
- 2010 – Kicsi ország
- 2011 – Instant Szeánsz (Live)
- 2013 – Kaktuszliget
- 2016 – English Breakfast
- 2016 – Jónás jelenései
