= Tankcsapda =

Hungarian rock band

- Origin: Debrecen, Hungary
- Genres: Rock; hard rock; punk rock; heavy metal
- Years active: 1989–present
- Labels: Magneoton; Sony Music; CLS; Tankcsapda Music
- Members: László Lukács; Tamás Fejes; Attila Vörös
- Past members: Levente Molnár; György Buzsik; Ottó Elek; Attila Tóth Laboncz; Gábor Sidlovics
- Website: www.tankcsapda.com

Tankcsapda is a Hungarian rock band formed in 1989.

== History ==
Tankcsapda was formed in 1989, in Debrecen, Hungary. The group started off as a power trio with only drums, bass and guitar playing punk rock, but continuously expanded their repertoire with different elements of rock music. They initially performed in small venues and published their first few albums on small independent labels. Their first album to reach good status was their fourth album, Az Ember Tervez (Man Makes Plans), released in 1995.

In 2003, they crossed over to the mainstream, with the release of their Élni vagy Égni (To Live or to Burn) album, and two singles off this record: "Be Vagyok Rúgva" ("I'm Drunk") and "Örökké Tart" ("Lasts Forever"). After the album of 2003 and the successful compilation album that followed, they released one of their heaviest albums to date, Mindenki Vár Valamit (Everyone's Expecting Something), succeeded by a live album Elektromágnes (Electromagnet). Their newest studio album, released in 2014, is Urai vagyunk a helyzetnek (We Are On Top of the Situation). Tankcsapda completed its first US tour in the fall of 2015 with Sledgeback.

== Discography ==
Albums

- Baj Van!! (1989) (There Is Trouble!!)
- Punk and Roll (1990)
- Legjobb Méreg (1992) (The Best Poison)
- Jönnek A Férgek (1994) (The Worms Are Comin')
- Az Ember Tervez (1995) (Man Plans)
- Eleven (1996) (Vivid/Lively)
- Cause for Sale (1996)
- Connektor:567 (1997)
- Ha Zajt Akartok (1998) (If You Want Noise)
- Tankológia (1999) (Tankology)
- Ez Az A ház - Maxi (2000) (This is the House)
- Agyarország (2001) (Magyarország = Hungary, Agyarország = Tusk Country)
- Baj Van (2002) (There Is Trouble)
- Szextárgy - Maxi (2003) (Sex Object)
- Élni vagy Égni (2003) (To Live or To Burn)
- A Legjobb Mérgek - Best Of (2004) (The Best Poisons - Best Of)
- Mindenki Vár Valamit (2006) (Everyone Waits for Somethin')
- Elektromágnes (2007) (Electromagnet)
- Minden Jót (2009) (All the Best)
- Rockmafia Debrecen (2012) (Rock Mafia in Debrecen)
- Igazi hiénák (2013) (True Hyenas)
- Urai vagyunk a helyzetnek (2014) (We Are On Top of the Situation)
- Liliput Hollywood (2019)

== Band members ==
=== Current lineup ===
- László Lukács – vocals/bass guitar (1993–present); vocals/guitars (1989–1993)
- Tamás Fejes – drums, percussion (2000–present)
- Attila Vörös - guitars (2026-present)

=== Former members ===
- Attila "Labi" Tóth Laboncz – bass guitar (1989–1993)
- György Buzsik – drums (1989–1997)
- Ottó Elek – drums (1997–2000)
- Levente "Cseresznye" ("Cherry") Molnár – guitars (1993–2012)
- Gábor Sidlovics "Sidi" - guitars (2012-2025)
