= Grimus =

1975 fantasy and science fiction novel by Salman Rushdie

- First edition
- Author: Salman Rushdie
- Language: English
- Genre: Fantasy novel/Science Fiction
- Publisher: Gollancz
- Publication date: 1975
- Publication place: Great Britain
- Media type: Print (hardback & paperback)
- Pages: 317 pp
- ISBN: 0-575-01871-2
- OCLC: 1324917
- Dewey Decimal: 823
- LC Class: PR6068.U757 G7 1975

Grimus is a 1975 fantasy and science fiction novel by Salman Rushdie. It was his literary debut.

The story loosely follows Flapping Eagle, a young Native American man who receives the gift of immortality by drinking a magic fluid. Thereafter, Flapping Eagle wanders the earth for 777 years 7 months and 7 days, searching for his immortal sister and exploring identities before falling through a hole in the Mediterranean Sea. He arrives in a parallel dimension at the mystical Calf Island, where those immortals who have tired of the world but are reluctant to give up their immortality exist in a static community under a subtle and sinister authority.

Published in 1975, Grimus was Salman Rushdie's first published novel. To a large extent it has been disparaged by academic critics; though Peter Kemp's comment is particularly vitriolic, it does give an idea of the novel's initial reception:

"His first novel, Grimus (1975), a ramshackle surreal saga based on a 12th-century Sufi poem and copiously encrusted with mythic and literary allusion, nosedived into oblivion amid almost universal critical derision."

== Style ==
Amongst other influences, Rushdie incorporates Sufi, Hindu, Christian and Norse mythologies alongside pre- and post-modernist literature into his construction of character and narrative form. Grimus was created with the intention of competing for Rushdie's then publisher, Victor Gollancz Ltd's "Science Fiction Prize". As an intended work of science fiction, it is comparable to David Lindsay's A Voyage to Arcturus in that there is very little actual science fiction. Rather inter-dimensional/interstellar travelling provides a narrative framework that loosely accords to the bildungsroman narrative form to allegorically encounter and investigate multiple social ideologies whilst in a search for a coherent centre of identity. It can be seen as growing out of and extending the techniques and the literary traditions identified with Jonathan Swift's Gulliver's Travels, or Sir Thomas More's Utopia, in that its journey traverses both outer and inner dimensions, exploring both cultural ideologies and the ambivalent effects that they have on one's psychological being.

Like much of Rushdie's work, Grimus undermines the concept of a "pure culture" by demonstrating the impossibility of any culture, philosophy or Weltanschauung existing in sterile isolation. This profoundly post-structuralist approach gains overt expression, for example, in Virgil's comment on the limitations of aesthetic theories that attempt to suppress their own contingencies: "Any intellect which confines itself to mere structuralism is bound to rest trapped in its own webs. Your words serve only to spin cocoons around your own irrelevance." [Grimus p. 91]

Further, in Grimus the habits that communities adopt to prevent themselves from acknowledging multiplicity gain allegorical representation in the Way of K. The Way of K may be seen as Rushdie probing the Rousseau-influenced theories of man and society that influenced much post-18th century Western travel writing and the modernist influenced literature of 1930s England in particular. In light of this, we can see Rushdie as having produced what Linda Hutcheon terms a "histiographic novel". That is, novels that explore and undermine concepts of stable cultural origins of identity.

Like his later work Midnight's Children, with Grimus Rushdie draws attention to the provisional status of his text’s ‘truth’ and thus the provisional status of any received account of reality, by using meta-texts that foreground the unnaturalness and bias of the text’s construction as an entity. For example, Grimus's epilogue includes a quotation from one of its own characters. Thus, the text revolves around the ‘symptoms of blindness which mark its conceptual limits’ rather than the direct expression of didactic insights.

Rushdie has argued that "one of the things that have happened in the 20th century is a colossal fragmentation reality". Hence, like Gabriel García Márquez, Grimus incorporates magic realism to transgress distinctions of genres, which mirrors "the state of confusion and alienation that defines postcolonial societies and individuals".

== Structure ==
One of Grimus's structural devices draws upon Attar of Nishapur's The Conference of the Birds. An allegorical poem that argues "God" to be the transcendental totality of life and reality rather than an entity external to reality. This is a fundamental aspect of Sufism, and Rushdie’s use of it prefigures his exploration of the relation of religion to reality in The Satanic Verses, Shame, East West and a number of his non-fiction works. Both narratives build towards the revelation of the "truth" that waits atop of the Mountain Qâf. The footnote in Virgil's diaries "explains" the use of "K" rather than "Q", which both overtly draws attention to the narrative as a construction, the effects of which are discussed above, and in a quite dark irony prefigures the "Rushdie Affair" when it states that "A purist would not forgive me, but there it is." [Grimus footnote p. 209]

The Dante Alighieri Divine Comedy provides the structure for Grimus's exploration of inner dimensions. i.e. a journey through concentric circles and a crossing of a river to arrive at the most terrifying, central region. Hence, Flapping Eagle's realisation that "[He] was climbing a mountain into the depths of an inferno plunging deep into myself" and his mistaking of Virgil Jones for "a demon" manifest as part of "some infernal torture" [Grimus p. 69]. This manipulation of the Inferno trope, so that it acts to reveal psychological rather than empirical reality, blurs the boundaries dividing internal and external realities, which is a fundamental conceit to the novel and Rushdie's works as a whole. The basing of Calf Island on a merger of Eastern and Western references (i.e. Dante's Mount Purgatory and Attar's Qâf Mountain) is emblematic of Rushdie's locating of post-colonial identity in an eclectic coalescence of cultures.

== Paired characters ==
Kathryn Hume argues that one of Rushdie's most effective techniques for emphasising problematic dualistic thinking is the pairing of characters. However, with Grimus's lack of initial commercial success and the furore over The Satanic Verses, most critics have overlooked the far more interesting exploration of religious tropes embodied in the pairing of Grimus and Flapping Eagle. Grimus representing the godhead of Islam/Sufism whilst Flapping Eagle represents Hinduism's Shiva. As is typical of Rushdie the divisions of characteristics distinguishing the polarities of this pair are traumatised and blurred as these characters are structurally and literally paired, blended and unified within the text.

Reviews of the book when first it was published emphasised its science-fiction elements. The science fiction author Brian Aldiss has claimed that he, Kingsley Amis and Arthur C. Clarke served on a science-fiction book prize jury at the time which identified Grimus as the best candidate for a science fiction book of the year award, but this prize was refused by the publishers who did not want the book to be classified as science fiction for marketing reasons.
