= MTV Europe Music Award for Best Hungarian Act =

Category of MTV Europe Music Awards

The following is a list of the MTV Europe Music Award winners and nominees for Best Hungarian Act.

== Winners and nominees ==
Winners are listed first and highlighted in bold.

=== 2000s ===
Year	Artist	Ref
2007
2007	**Ákos**	
2007	Heaven Street Seven	
2007	The Idoru	
2007	The Moog	
2007	Neo	
2008
2008	**Gonzo**	
2008	Beat Dis	
2008	Irie Maffia	
2008	The Unbending Trees	
2008	Žagar	
2009
2009	**The Kolin**	
2009	Esclin Syndo	
2009	The Idoru	
2009	The Moog	
2009	Zagar	

=== 2010s ===
Year	Artist	Ref
2010
2010	**The Kolin**	
2010	Hősök	
2010	Kiscsillag	
2010	Nemjuci	
2010	Neo	
2011
2011	**Compact Disco**	
2011	Bin Jip	
2011	Fish!	
2011	Punnany Massif	
2011	The Carbonfools	
2012
2012	**30Y**	
2012	Funktasztikus	
2012	Odett	
2012	Soerii és Poolek	
2012	Supernem	
2013
2013	**Ivan & The Parazol**	
2013	Hősök	
2013	Karanyi	
2013	Punnany Massif	
2013	The hated tomorrow	
2017
2017	**Magdolna Rúzsa**	
2017	Freddie	
2017	Gabi Tóth	
2017	Joci Pápai	
2017	Kowalsky Meg A Vega	
2018
2018	**Follow The Flow**	
2018	Margaret Island	
2018	Wellhello	
2018	Caramel	
2018	Halott Pénz	
2019
2019	**Viktor Király**	
2019	Hősök	
2019	Jumodaddy	
2019	András Kállay-Saunders	
2019	Mörk	

=== 2020s ===
Year	Artist	Ref
2020
2020	**Dzsúdló**	
2020	Irie Maffia	
2020	ByeAlex	
2020	Viktoria Metzker	
2020	Carson Coma	
2021
2021	**Azahriah**	
2021	Follow the Flow	
2021	Halott Pénz	
2021	Margaret Island	
2021	Wellhello	
2022
2022	**Carson Coma**	
2022	Beton.Hofi	
2022	Дeva	
2022	Elefánt	
2022	Krúbi	
2023
2023	**Ajsa Luna**	
2023	Analog Balaton	
2023	Beton.Hofi	
2023	Co Lee	
2023	Hundred Sins	
