= Carson Coma =

Hungarian alternative rock band

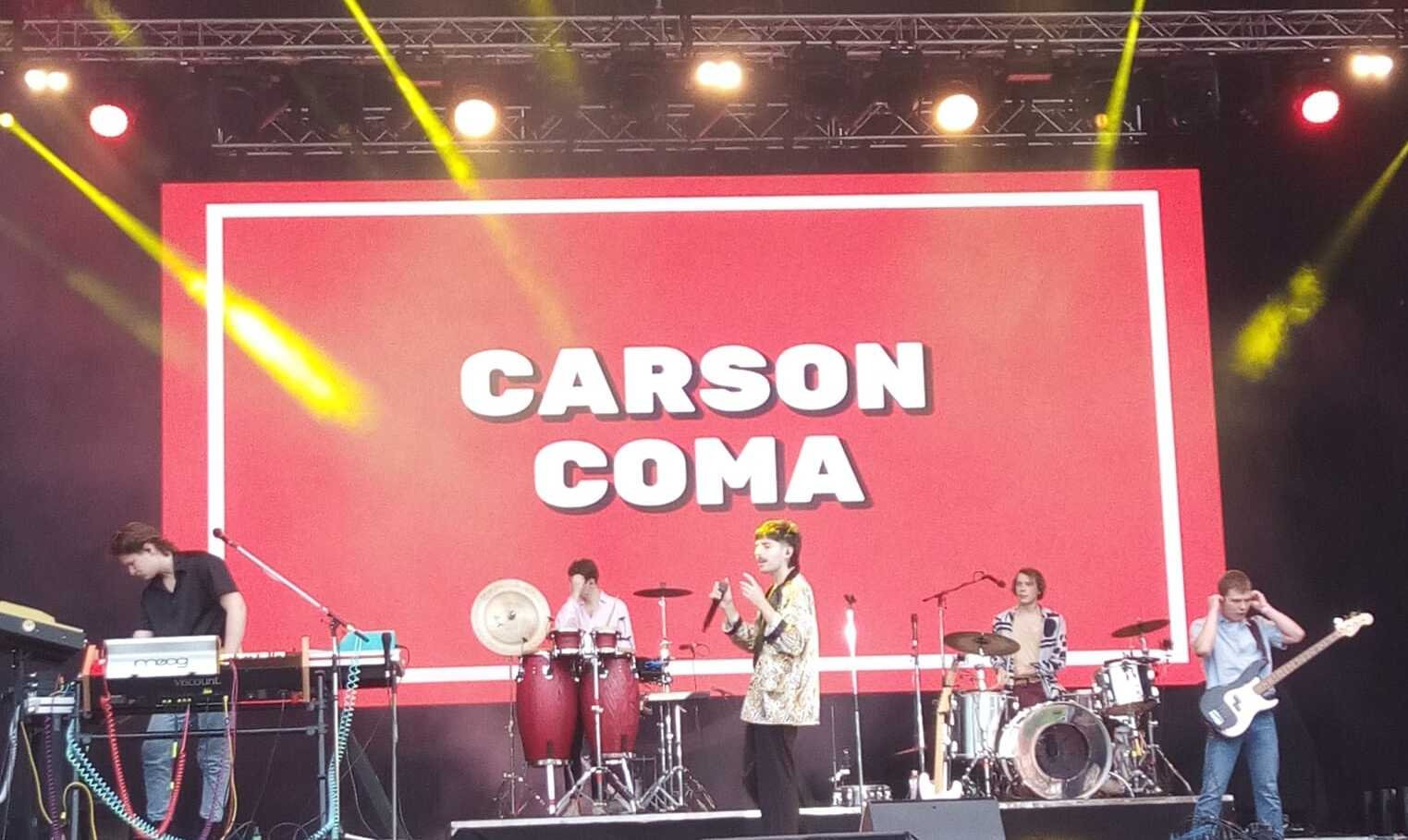
- Carson Coma performing at SZIN Festival 2022

Background information
- Origin: Budapest, Hungary
- Genres: Alternative rock
- Years active: 2018-present
- Labels: Gold Record; Supermanagement
- Members: Zsombor Bóna; Giorgio Fekete; Péter Gaál; Barnabás Hera; Attila Jónás; Bálint Kun
- Website: carsoncoma.hu

Carson Coma is a Hungarian alternative rock band formed in 2018, which won the MTV Europe Music Award for Best Hungarian Act in 2022. They released their first album Corduroy Club in April 2019, which included the singles "What A Time To Be Alive" and "Song About My Grandma". Since their first album, on which the majority of songs were in English, they have switched to producing music in Hungarian. They have subsequently released five further albums, as well as nine non-album singles, and an EP.

== History ==
The band released their first single, titled "What A Time To Be Alive", in September 2018, to positive critical reception. They released a further single, "Song About My Grandma", in April 2019, and then their debut album Corduroy Club (on which both songs featured) in the same month. The album was described as "1960s Hungarian beat and dance music-inspired" by Müpa Budapest.

2020 saw an increase in recognition for the band, as they won the Fonogram Award for Best Hungarian Discovery of the Year in April of that year. Their second album, Lesz, ami lesz, was released in October, and featured four previously released singles: "Peti és Én", "Én még sohasem", "Egyszerűen semmi sem egyszerű", and "Na mindegy".

In March 2022, the band released their third album, entitled Digitális/Analóg. A month later, they achieved their first chart success, with the single Immunissá válunk entering at #38 on the Hungarian Single Top 40 in April - the album would reach #35 in July. Then, they took part in Dalfutár project, where they produced and played the song "Te maradtál", which was written for Ildikó Keresztes. They also performed for the first time at Sziget Festival in August.

The latest album, IV, was released in June 2023, and featured the singles FELDOBOM A KÖVET and FANTOMREZGÉS, the former of which was noted for its strong political message. They performed a sold-out concert in Budapest Park to promote the album that month, and then organised a "mini-festival" there in September featuring 8 Hungarian performers.

In early 2024, the band released the single Frida Kahlo featuring Beton.Hofi, using the eponymous Mexican artist as a device to demonstrate contempt for mainstream culture. Two more singles were subsequently released, titled Paul McCartney halott? and Orrvérzés. Having reached their 5th anniversary the year before, the band performed a celebratory concert at the MVM Dome in April featuring their greatest hits and guest performances from Beton.Hofi and Ivan & The Parazol, from which a live album was released.

The band participated in the semi-finals of San Marino Song Contest, San Marino's national final for the Eurovision Song Contest 2025. They reached the second chance round but failed to make the final. Later that year, they announced the release of their fifth album, Purgatórium, which included the singles Libikóka; Isten, haza, család; Purgatórium; and Szemüveg.

== Members ==
- Zsombor Bóna - guitar
- Giorgio Fekete - guitar, vocals
- Péter Gaál - percussion
- Barnabás Hera - drums, vocals
- Attila Jónás - bass guitar
- Bálint Kun - keyboard

== Discography ==
=== Studio albums ===
Year	Title	Peak positions
Year	Title	HUN
2019	Corduroy Club	–
2020	Lesz, ami lesz	27
2022	Digitális/Analóg	23
2023	IV	15
2025	Purgatórium	3
" – " denotes a release that did not chart.

=== Live albums ===
Year	Title
2024	MVM DOME 2024 (Live)

=== Extended plays ===
Year	Title
2024	Frida Kahlo

=== Singles ===
As lead artist
Year	Title	Peak positions	Album
Year	Title	HUN	Album
2018	What A Time To Be Alive	–	Corduroy Club
2019	Song About My Grandma	–	Corduroy Club
2019	Nem vagyok ideges (Live session)	–	Non-album single
2019	Peti és Én	–	Lesz, ami lesz
2020	Én még sohasem	–	Lesz, ami lesz
2020	Egyszerűen semmi sem egyszerű	–	Lesz, ami lesz
2020	Na mindegy	–	Lesz, ami lesz
2021	Pók	– (Note: Did not enter the Single Top 40 chart, but peaked at #18 on the Stream Top 40)	Digitális/Analóg
2021	Kék Hullám Kemping	– (Note: Did not enter the Single Top 40 chart, but peaked at #31 on the Radio Top 40)	Digitális/Analóg
2022	Osztálytalálkozó	– (Note: Did not enter the Single Top 40 chart, but peaked at #23 on the Stream Top 40)	Digitális/Analóg
2022	Immunissá válunk	19	Digitális/Analóg
2022	Bábu vagy	–	Non-album single
2022	Marokkó	–	Non-album single
2022	Körforgalom	34	Non-album single
2023	FELDOBOM A KÖVET	36	IV
2023	FANTOMREZGÉS	– (Note: Did not enter the Single Top 40 chart, but peaked at #34 on the Stream Top 40)	IV
2024	Frida Kahlo (featuring Beton.Hofi)	33	Non-album single
2024	Paul McCartney halott?	–	Non-album single
2024	Orrvérzés	–	Non-album single
2024	plusz egy (+1)	–	Non-album single
2025	Daddy Said No	–	Non-album single
2025	Libikóka	17	Purgatórium
2025	Isten, haza, család	–	Purgatórium
2025	Purgatórium (featuring Beton.Hofi and Krúbi)	3	Purgatórium
2025	Szemüveg	28	Purgatórium
" – " denotes a release that did not chart.

As featured artist
Year	Title	Peak positions
Year	Title	HUN
2021	Kérdőjelek és a válaszok by Ivan & The Parazol	– (Note: Did not enter the Single Top 40 chart, but peaked at #35 on the Radio Top 40)
" – " denotes a release that did not chart.

== Awards ==
- Fonogram Award for Hungarian Discovery of the Year (hu) (2020)
- MTV Europe Music Award for Best Hungarian Act (2022)
- Artisjus Award (hu) for Junior Popular Music Creator of the Year (2022)
- Fonogram Award for National Alternative or Indie-rock Album of the Year (2024)
