= 2021 MTV Europe Music Awards =

2021 European music award show

- Date: 14 November 2021
- Location: László Papp Budapest Sports Arena, Budapest, Hungary
- Hosted by: Saweetie
- Most wins: BTS (4)
- Most nominations: Justin Bieber (8)
- Website: mtvema.com

Television/radio coverage
- Network: MTV (International); Channel 5 (UK); 10 Shake (AUS); VH1 India and Voot Select (IND)
- Produced by: Bruce Gilmer; Richard Godfrey; Debbie Phillips; Chloe Mason

The 2021 MTV Europe Music Awards were held on 14 November 2021 at the László Papp Budapest Sports Arena in Budapest, Hungary. This marked the first time that Hungary hosted the awards show, and as well the first edition to be held in a former Eastern Bloc country. The show was presented by American rapper Saweetie.

Justin Bieber led the nominations, with a total of eight, making him the most nominated male artist. Doja Cat and Lil Nas X were both tied, with six nominations, with Doja being the most nominated female act.

== Performances ==
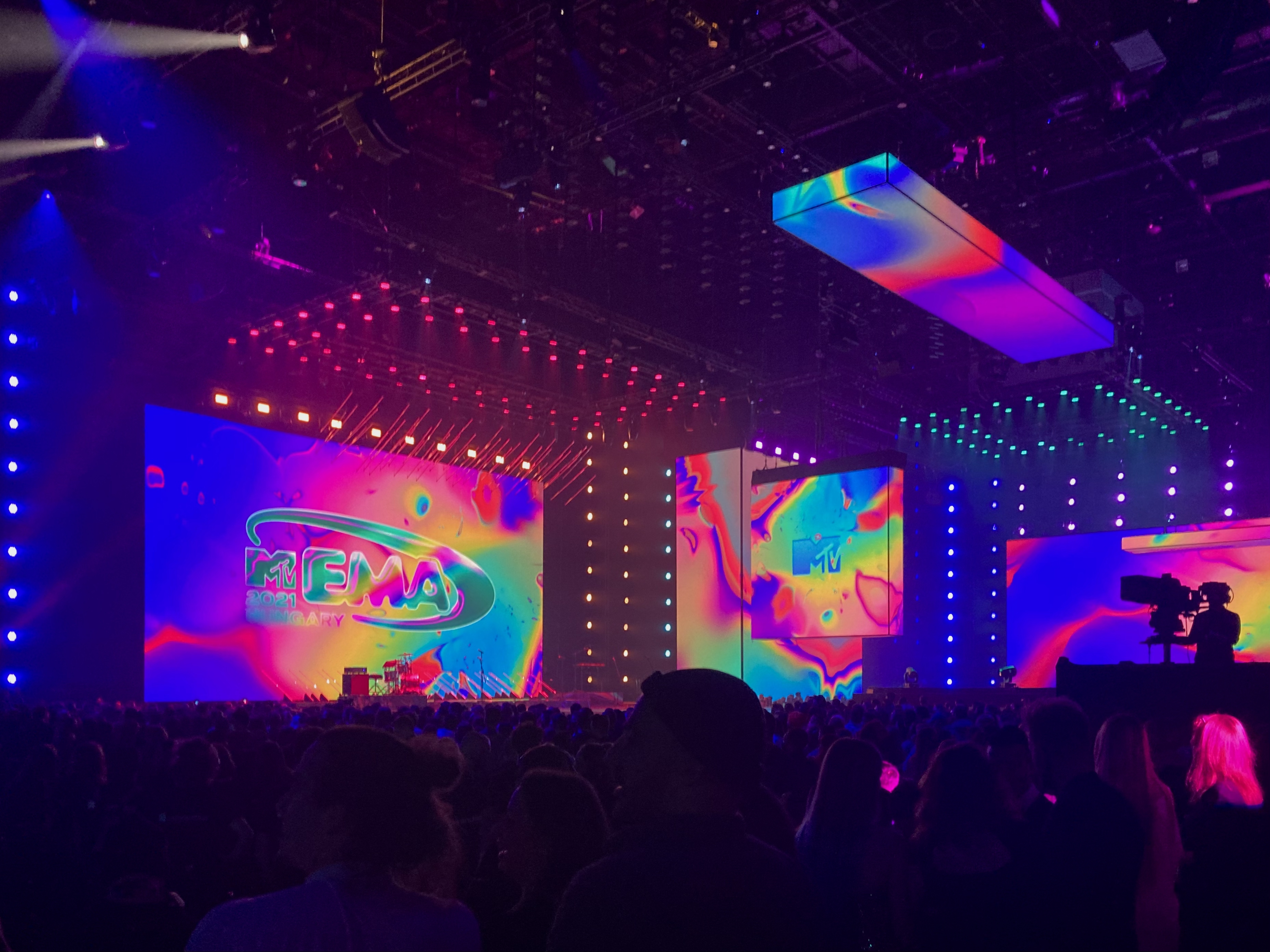
The stage of the event.

The performers were announced on 11 November 2021.

List of musical performances
Artist(s)	Song(s)
Main show
Ed Sheeran	"Overpass Graffiti" "Shivers"
Saweetie	"Tap In" "Best Friend" "Out Out"
Imagine Dragons; JID	"Enemy"
Griff	"One Night"
Girl in Red	"Serotonin"
OneRepublic	"Run" (Filmed at Heroes' Square)
Maluma; Rayvanny	"Mama Tetema"
Måneskin	"Mammamia"
Kim Petras	"Coconuts" "Hit It From The Back"
YUNGBLUD	"Fleabag"

== Presenters ==
The presenters were announced on 11 November 2021.

- Becca Dudley – Pre-show co-host
- Jack Saunders – Pre-show co-host
- Rita Ora – presented Best Latin
- Winnie Harlow – presented Best Hip-Hop
- Joel Corry – presented Best New
- Drew McIntyre – presented Best Rock
- Ryan Tedder – presented Best Song
- Manu Gavassi – presented Best Alternative
- Olly Alexander – presented Best Video
- Saweetie – presented Best Artist

== Winners and nominations ==
The nominations were announced on 20 October 2021. The category Best K-Pop was introduced this year.

Best Song	Best Video
Ed Sheeran — "Bad Habits"; Doja Cat (featuring SZA) — "Kiss Me More"; Justin Bieber (featuring Daniel Caesar & Giveon) — "Peaches"; Lil Nas X – "Montero (Call Me By Your Name)"; Olivia Rodrigo — "Drivers License"; the Kid Laroi and Justin Bieber – "Stay"	Lil Nas X – "Montero (Call Me By Your Name)"; Doja Cat (featuring SZA) — "Kiss Me More"; Ed Sheeran — "Bad Habits"; Justin Bieber (featuring Daniel Caesar & Giveon) — "Peaches"; Normani (featuring Cardi B) – "Wild Side"; Taylor Swift – "willow"
Best Collaboration	Best Artist
Doja Cat (featuring SZA) — "Kiss Me More"; Black Eyed Peas and Shakira — "Girl Like Me"; Lil Nas X and Jack Harlow – "Industry Baby"; the Kid Laroi and Justin Bieber – "Stay"; Silk Sonic — "Leave the Door Open"; The Weeknd and Ariana Grande – "Save Your Tears (Remix)"	Ed Sheeran; Doja Cat; Justin Bieber; Lady Gaga; Lil Nas X; The Weeknd
Best Group	Best New
BTS; Imagine Dragons; Jonas Brothers; Little Mix; Måneskin; Silk Sonic	Saweetie; Giveon; Griff; Olivia Rodrigo; Rauw Alejandro; the Kid Laroi
Best Pop	Best Electronic
BTS; Doja Cat; Dua Lipa; Ed Sheeran; Justin Bieber; Olivia Rodrigo	David Guetta; Calvin Harris; Joel Corry; Marshmello; Skrillex; Swedish House Mafia
Best Rock	Best Alternative
Måneskin; Coldplay; Foo Fighters; Imagine Dragons; Kings of Leon; The Killers	Yungblud; Halsey; Lorde; Machine Gun Kelly; Twenty One Pilots; Willow
Best Hip-Hop	Best Latin
Nicki Minaj; Cardi B; DJ Khaled; Drake; Kanye West; Megan Thee Stallion	Maluma; Bad Bunny; J Balvin; Rauw Alejandro; Rosalía; Shakira
Best K-Pop	Best Push
BTS; Lisa; Monsta X; NCT 127; Rosé; Twice	Olivia Rodrigo; 24kGoldn; Foushée; Girl in Red; Griff; JC Stewart; Jxdn; Latto; Madison Beer; Remi Wolf; Saint Jhn; the Kid Laroi
Biggest Fans	Video for Good
BTS; Ariana Grande; Blackpink; Justin Bieber; Lady Gaga; Taylor Swift	Billie Eilish — "Your Power"; Demi Lovato — "Dancing with the Devil"; Girl in Red — "Serotonin"; H.E.R. — "Fight for You"; Harry Styles — "Treat People with Kindness"; Lil Nas X — "Montero (Call Me By Your Name)"

== Regional awards ==
Regional nominations were announced on 20 October 2021.

Europe
Best French Act	Best German Act
Amel Bent; Dadju; Jérémy Frérot; Tayc; Vianney	badmómzjay; Álvaro Soler; Provinz; Tokio Hotel; Zoe Wees
Best Hungarian Act	Best Israeli Act
Azahriah; Follow the Flow; Halott Pénz; Margaret Island; Wellhello	Noa Kirel; Eden Ben Zaken; Eden Derso; Noga Erez; Jasmin Moallem
Best Italian Act	Best Nordic Act
Aka 7even; Caparezza; Madame; Måneskin; Rkomi	Tessa (Denmark); Drew Sycamore (Denmark); Sigrid (Norway); Swedish House Mafia (Sweden); Zara Larsson (Sweden)
Best Polish Act	Best Portuguese Act
Daria Zawiałow; Brodka; Krzysztof Zalewski; Margaret; sanah	Diogo Piçarra; Bárbara Tinoco; Nenny; Plutónio; Wet Bed Gang
Best MTV Russia Act	Best Spanish Act
Max Barskih; Mari Kraimbrery; Musia Totibadze; Imanbek; Slava Marlow	Aitana; Ana Mena; C. Tangana; Colectivo Da Silva; Pablo Alborán
Best Swiss Act	Best UK & Ireland Act
Gjon's Tears; Arma Jackson; Monet192; Stefanie Heinzmann; Loredana	Little Mix; Dave; Dua Lipa; Ed Sheeran; KSI
Africa
Best African Act
Wizkid (Nigeria); Amaarae (Ghana); Diamond Platnumz (Tanzania); Focalistic (South Africa); Tems (Nigeria)
Asia
Best Indian Act
Divine; Ananya Birla; Kaam Bhaari × Spitfire × Rākhis; Raja Kumari; Zephyrtone
Best Japanese Act	Best Korean Act
Sakurazaka46; Awesome City Club; Eve; STUTS; Vaundy	Aespa; Cravity; STAYC; Weeekly; WEi
Best Southeast Asian Act
JJ Lin (Singapore); Ink Waruntorn (Thailand); K-ICM (Vietnam); Naim Daniel (Malaysia); Lyodra (Indonesia); SB19 (Philippines)
Australia and New Zealand
Best Australian Act	Best New Zealand Act
Ruel; Amy Shark; Masked Wolf; The Kid Laroi; Tones and I	Teeks; Broods; Jolyon Petch; Lorde; Six60
Americas
Best Brazilian Act	Best Canadian Act
Manu Gavassi; Anitta; Ludmilla; Luísa Sonza; Pabllo Vittar	Johnny Orlando; Justin Bieber; Shawn Mendes; The Weeknd; Tate McRae
Best Caribbean Act	Best Latin America North Act
Bad Bunny; Farruko; Guaynaa; Natti Natasha; Rauw Alejandro	Alemán; Danna Paola; Gera MX; Humbe; Sofía Reyes
Best Latin America Central Act	Best Latin America South Act
Sebastián Yatra; Camilo; J Balvin; Karol G; Maluma	Tini; Duki; Nicki Nicole; María Becerra; Trueno
Best US Act
Taylor Swift; Ariana Grande; Doja Cat; Lil Nas X; Olivia Rodrigo

== Controversy ==
Following the adoption of the Hungarian anti-LGBTQ law in June 2021, concerns were raised over Budapest being the location of the event. President and CEO of MTV Entertainment Group Worldwide Chris McCarthy explained that no censorship by the Hungarian government will be tolerated:

"As a gay man, my personal emotions got the better of me. After learning this legislation passed, my knee jerk reaction was that we should move the event to another country. However, I picked up the phone to connect with global LGBTQ+ advocates, [...] and consulted our LGBTQ+ employee resource group, Emerge. The decision was very clear to all of us, [...] we should not move the event. Instead, we should move forward, using the show as an opportunity to stand in solidarity with the LGBTQ+ community in Hungary and around the world as we continue to fight for equality for all".

Performers included Kim Petras, the first out trans performer at the EMAs, with an act that was intentionally "raunchy and sex positive" and who spoke out to say "It's going to be pretty powerful to be in Hungary and perform the show when these laws have just happened". Other artists were also given stage time to speak out against Hungarian anti-LGBTQ+ policies, including Saweetie and Lil Nas X.

There were also announced five "Generation Change Awards", introduced by Drew Barrymore and honouring LGBTQ+ activists from Iraq, Nigeria, Brazil, the United States and Hungary, with Budapest Pride organiser Viktória Radványi accepting the award in person; the other honourees were Amir Ashour, founder of IraQueer; Matthew Blaise, founder of The Oasis Project in Nigeria; Sage Dolan-Sandrino, an Afro-Cuban queer and trans artist from the United States; and Erika Hilton, the first black trans woman elected to the Municipal Chamber of São Paulo.
