= Zoltán Takács (musician) =

Hungarian musician and record producer

- Also known as: Jappán
- Born: December 17, 1979 (age 46); Hódmezővásárhely, Hungary
- Genres: Alternative rock
- Occupations: Keyboardist, producer
- Years active: 1998–present

Takács Zoltán (born December 17, 1979) is a Hungarian musician and record producer, best known internationally as the keyboardist of the Hungarian alternative rock band Heaven Street Seven and the producer of Ivan & The Parazol's Mama Don't You Recognize Ivan & The Parazol.

== Life and career ==
Takács was born in 1979 in Hódmezővásárhely, Hungary. He attended the Márton Bálint elementary and secondary school in Törökbálint. He continued his studies at the Károli Gáspár University of the Reformed Church in Hungary at the Faculty of Far Eastern languages studying Japanese. He was nicknamed Japán (Japanese in Hungarian) by his fellows because of his unique choice of language studying.

=== Heaven Street Seven ===
In 1998 Takács joined the Budapest based alternative rock band Heaven Street Seven and has been the keyboardist for the band since then.

=== Production career ===
Takács started his record producer career by recording, mixing and mastering Heaven Street Seven's Szállj Ki és Gyalogolj in 2004 in Budapest at the Aquarium studios.

== Discography ==
Heaven Street Seven

- Tick Tock No Fear (1995)
- Goal (1997)
- Budapest Dolls (1998)
- Cukor (2000)
- Kisfilmek a nagyvilágból (2002)
- Szállj Ki És Gyalogolj (2004)
- Tick Tock No Fear (2005)
- Tudom, Hogy Szeretsz Titokban (2006)
- Sordid Little Symphonies (2007)
- Jazz (2008)

Soerii & Poolek

- Ua-mua (2010)
- Elton John (2010)

== Production ==
- 2004: Heaven Street Seven – Szállj Ki és Gyalogolj
- 2007: 30Y – Semmi Szédítő Magasság
- 2008: Heaven Street Seven – Jazz
- 2010: 30Y – Városember
- 2011: Supernem – Tudományos Fantasztikus Pop
- 2011: Fran Palermo – Museum of Clouds
- 2012: Heaven Street Seven – Felkeltem A Reggelt
- 2011: Óriás – Gondalapos
- 2012: Odett – Hanyatt, Homlok, Egyenes
- 2012: 30Y – Szentimentálé
- 2012: Ivan & The Parazol – Mama Don't You Recognize Ivan & The Parazol
- 2012: Fran Palermo – Natural Cash
- 2013: Óriás – Tűz, Víz, Repülő

== Personal life ==
In 2014 Erika Anikó Brouwer, Takács's partner, gave birth to their first child, Ábel Takács-Brouwer.

== See also ==
- Heaven Street Seven
- Hungarian alternative
- Budapest indie music scene
- Hungarian metal
- Hungarian pop
- Hungarian rock
- Notable Hungarian producers
