= Máté Balla =

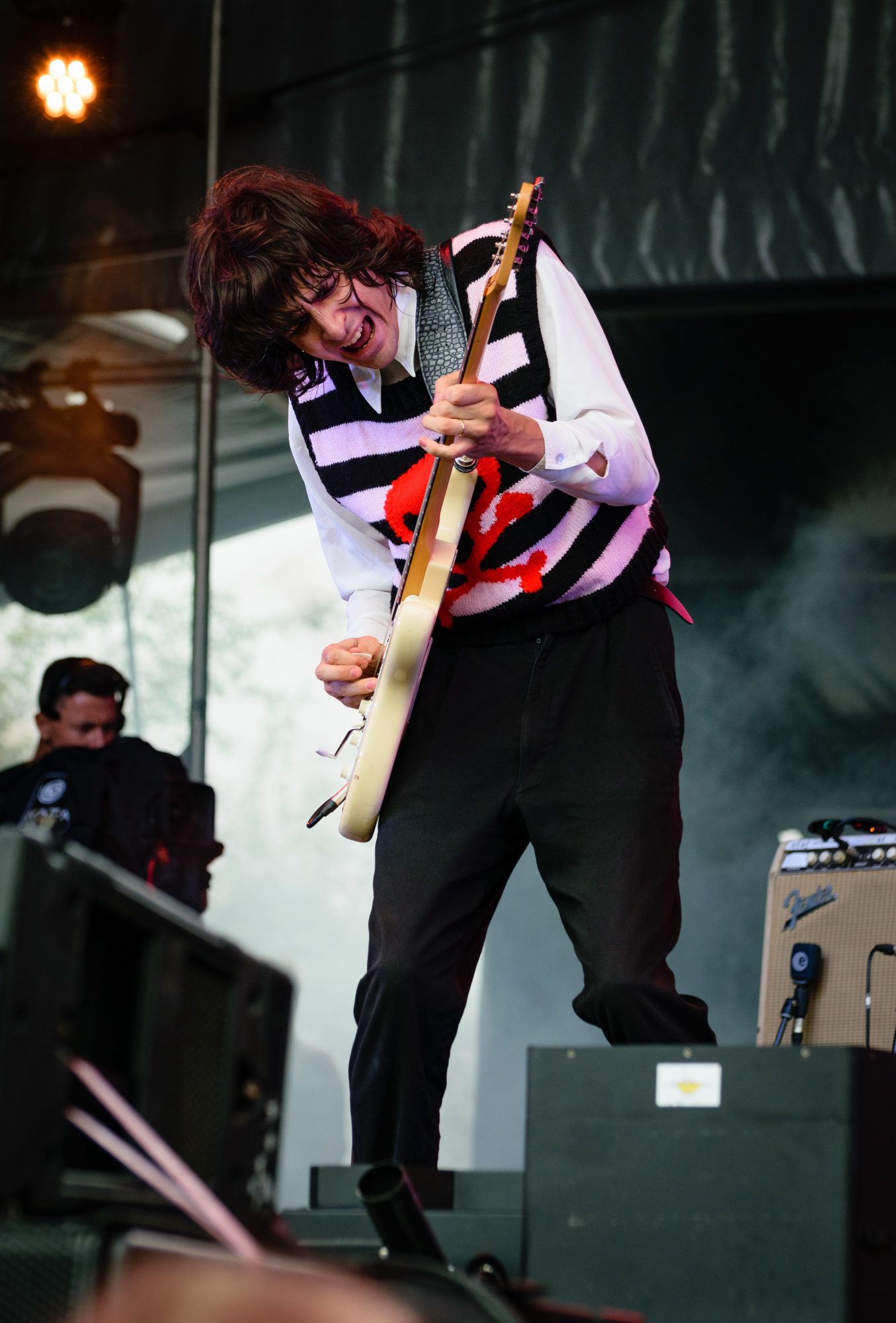

Background information
- Born: Máté Balla; 12 January 1991 (age 35); Budapest, Hungary
- Genres: Garage rock, Indie rock
- Instrument: Lead guitar
- Years active: 2010–present
- Member of: Ivan & The Parazol

Máté Balla (born 12 January 1991) is a Hungarian rock musician, best known as the guitarist of the garage rock band Ivan & The Parazol.

== Early life and personal life ==
Balla was born in Budapest, Hungary. In an interview with NullaHatEgy, Balla said that Ivan & The Parazol play Classic rock rather than Indie rock. He also pointed out that in Hungary the Hungarian indie bands were not persistent enough to reach international success.

On 10 June 2015, Balla was featured on D'Addario's website as a user of the strings.

== Ivan & The Parazol ==
Balla is the founding member of Ivan & The Parazol.

== Discography ==
With Ivan & The Parazol:

- Yellow Flavour (2012)
- Sellin' My Soul (2012)
- Mama Don't You Recognize Ivan & The Parazol? (2012)
- Mode Bizarre (2014)
- The All Right Nows (2015)

== Instruments ==
=== Guitars ===
- Fender Stratocaster

=== Effect pedals ===
- Boss DS-2
- Electro-Harmonix Big Muff

=== Strings ===
- D'Addario EXL 120
- D'Addario EXL 115
- D'Addario EJ 26

=== Amplifiers ===
- Orange

== See also ==
- Budapest indie music scene
- Ivan & The Parazol
