= Azahriah =

Hungarian singer and YouTuber

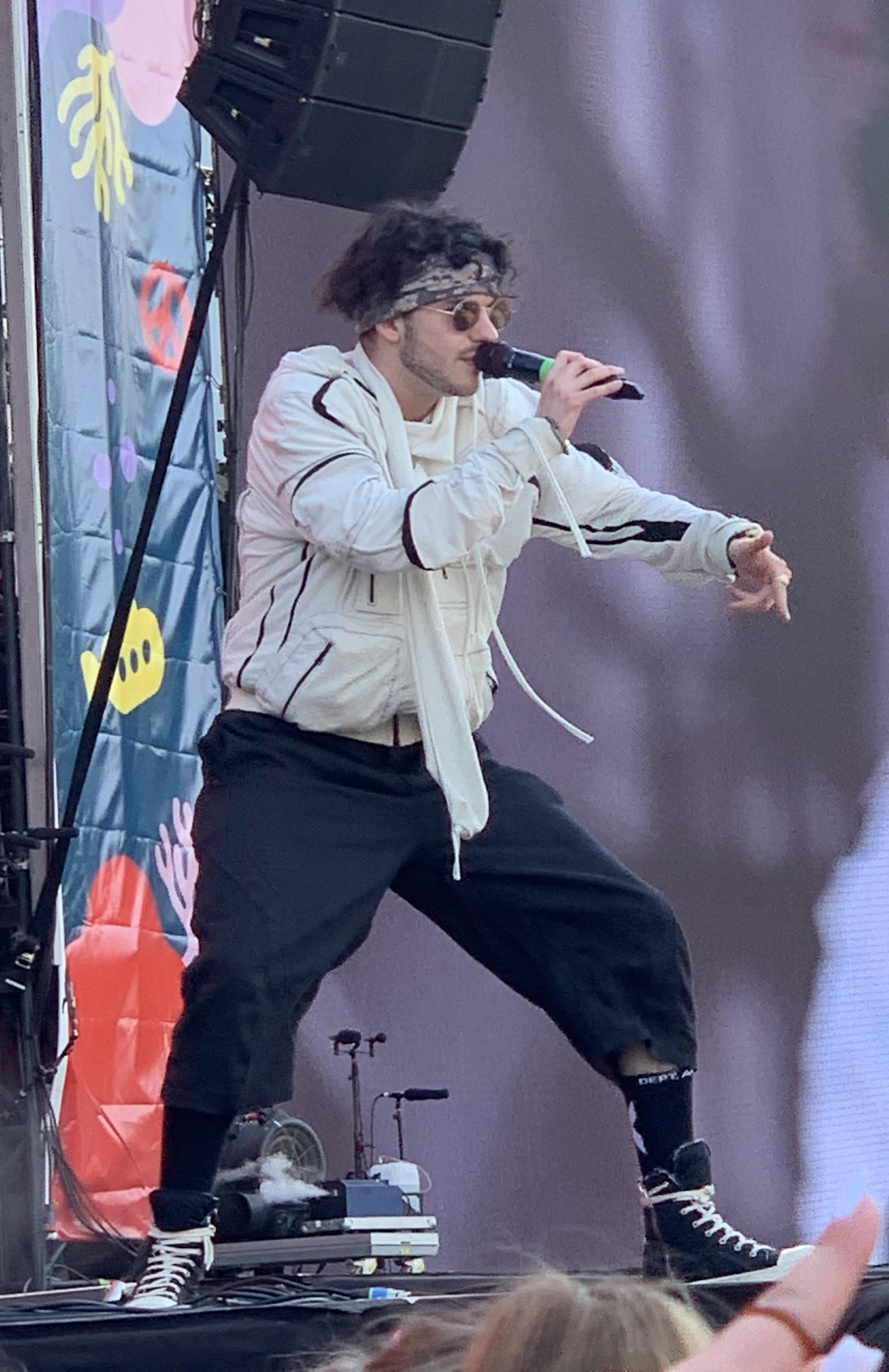
- Azahriah in 2022
- Born: Attila Baukó; 28 January 2002 (age 24); Újpalota, Budapest, Hungary
- Other name: Paul Street
- Occupations: Singer; lyricist; composer; YouTuber
- Musical career
- Genres: Pop; alternative pop; hip hop
- Instruments: Vocals; guitar
- Years active: 2019–present
- Label: Supermanagement
- Website: www.facebook.com/azahriah.official

Attila Baukó (born 28 January 2002), known professionally as Azahriah, is a Hungarian musician, guitarist, singer, rapper, songwriter and former YouTuber.

He first appeared as Paul Street on YouTube, covering frightening and mysterious topics with a series called Rejtélyek nyomában ("Trailing mysteries"). He has been playing the guitar since childhood, and started making music in 2017 in a more serious manner. He has been publishing his songs under the stage name Azahriah since 2019. The name comes from the Latin version Uzziah, the tenth king of the ancient Kingdom of Judah.

He is considered one of the most popular artists in modern Hungarian history. Hit songs like Rét and Mind1 cemented his position in the Hungarian music scene, and is often cited as his best works. He performed to full houses in Puskás Aréna on three consecutive occasions (24, 25, and 26 May 2024), becoming the first Hungarian artist to do so.

== Early life ==
Attila Baukó was born in the Újpalota neighbourhood of Budapest in 2002. His parents divorced, but he maintains a good relationship with both of them. His mother is a professional soldier, who served in the peacekeeping forces in Kosovo twice. His father worked at a car manufacturer in Germany. He learned making videos, as well as playing the guitar and speaking English, from YouTube tutorials.

He wanted to make music from an early age and picked up the guitar due to his affection for heavy metal. Some of his favorite artists are Slipknot, System of a Down, Metallica, Iron Maiden, Pink Floyd and Led Zeppelin.

== YouTube career ==
He started a YouTube channel on 9 February 2014, titled "Paul Street". The name is a reference to the classic Hungarian novel The Paul Street Boys. Initially, he posted vlogs, then later started making videos about mysterious and/or frightening topics. The channel had more than 500,000 subscribers in April 2023.

== Music career ==
=== Early career (2019-2021) ===
He started releasing his songs under the pseudonym Azahriah in 2019, with the help of Botond Pócsi (Hundred Sins). His first self-composed song, titled "Hathor" was released on 28 January 2020. His debut album, I'm Worse, with English lyrics, was released on 15 April 2020.

His first manager actively prevented Azahriah from signing to Supermanagement, a Hungarian record label. With the help of DESH, who is signed by Supermanagement, Azahriah started releasing songs with DESH under Supermanagement without a contract. Their first song, Rét, released on November 4 2020, was a commercial success, reaching #7 in Mahasz Stream Top 40. On May 29 2021, Azahriah and DESH released Mind1 (a play on the word 'mindegy', meaning 'nevermind'), a single for their upcoming album A ló túloldalán. The song became their biggest for both artists, and topped the Top 40 charts. It is one of Azahriah's signature songs. His second English language album, camouflage, was released on 29 June 2021. In late 2021, Azahriah's manager absconded with the entirety of the revenue they gained from past performances. After the manager left, Azahriah terminated their contract, and signed with Supermanagement.

At the 2021 MTV Europe Music Awards, he was chosen as the Best Hungarian Act, beating popular artists like Halott Pénz and Wellhello.

=== A ló túloldalán, Papp László Aréna, and Memento (2021-2023) ===
On 20 May 2022, as a collaborative album with popular Hungarian musician DESH, they released A ló túloldalán, which topped the Mahasz Top 40 Albums, and is popular among fans. In 2024, the album was certified 15× platinum by the Hungarian Recording Industry Association (Mahasz).

He released an EP titled silbak on 10 August 2022. All the songs charted on the Mahasz Stream Top 40, and some of them appeared on other Mahasz charts and Billboard's local Hungary Songs chart.

On 10 March 2023, Azahriah held a concert at the László Papp Budapest Sports Arena.

On May 1 2023, He released his third album, Memento. The lead single on the album, Introvertált dal, topped four Mahasz charts, and is one of Azahriah's signature songs. On August 24 2023, Azahriah and DESH released an EP titled tripq, which peaked at number one on Mahasz Top 40 Albums.

=== Puskás Aréna, Skatulya I/II, and Aziverzum (2023-present) ===
His fourth album, skatulya I was released on April 18 2024, with two singles; mariana.árok and cipoe. Both singles topped the Mahasz top 40 Singles chart. Azahriah described the album as his most "experimental" work.

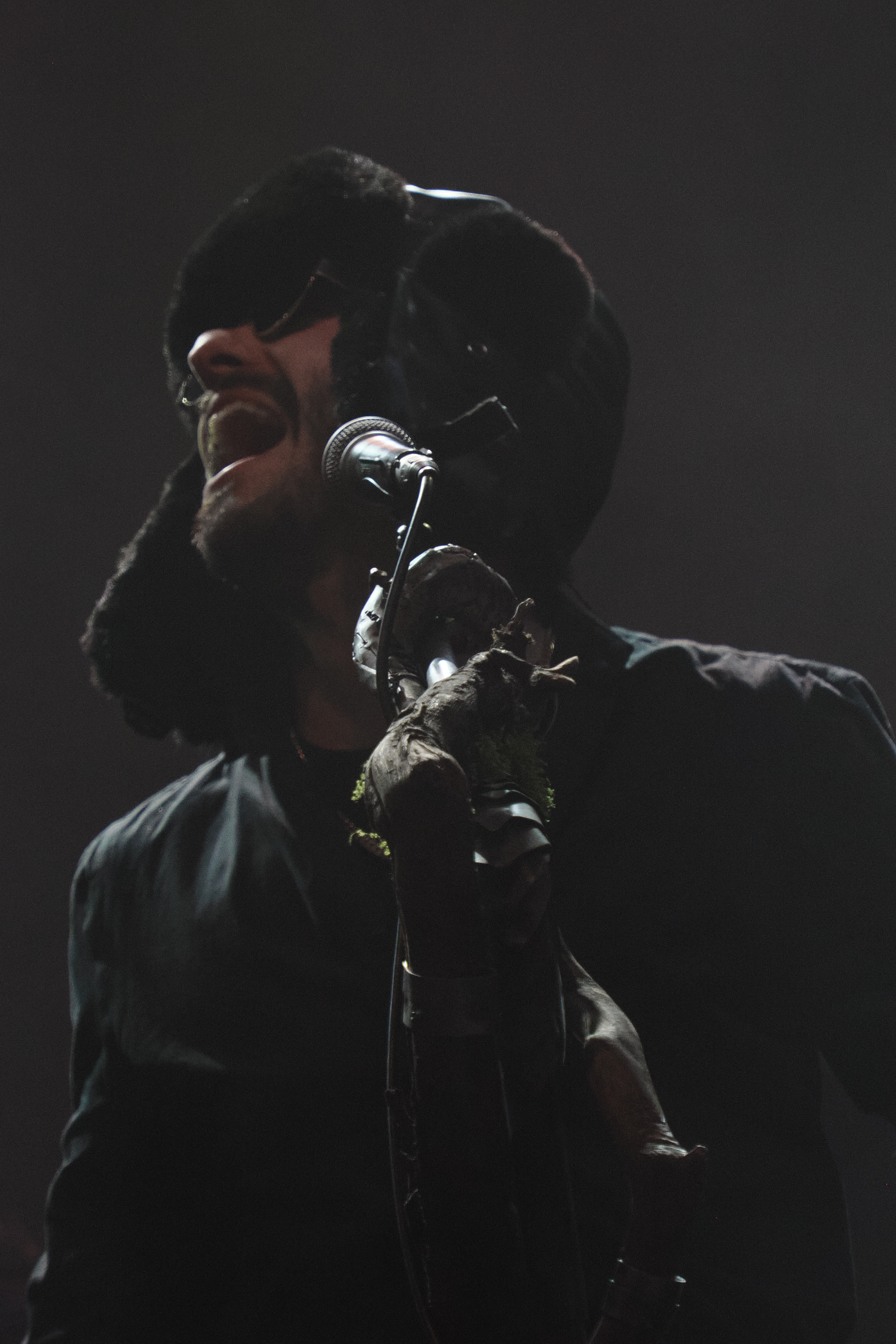
Azahriah at the Rendszerbontó Nagykoncert in 2026

In May 2024, He performed in Puskás Aréna three consecutive times (May 24, 25, and 26). All three performances sold out, with 160,000 tickets sold, and an income of 2 billion forints (approx. US$6 million). The performance was one of the biggest in Hungarian history.

On June 2 2025, he revealed via a billboard in Deák Ferenc tér that he will perform in MVM Dome on October 17 2025. After the event sold out, he announced a second concert on October 18, which also sold out.

On October 17th, during his performance, he released his fifth album, skatulya II, and debuted singles from the album at the event. The following day, during his second performance at MVM, he released another album, Aziverzum. Both albums peaked at number one and two on Albums Top 40, respectively.

On April 10 2026, 2 days before the 2026 Hungarian parliamentary election, as part of the Rendszerbontó Nagykoncert (lit. 'System-dismantling Big Concert') organized by Róbert Puzsér, and set at Heroes' Square (Hősök tere), he performed at the event to nearly 300,000 people. Azahriah debuted his new song utema at the event, a protest song criticizing the Orbán government. The song was released on April 12, the day of the election.

== Discography ==
=== Studio albums ===
List of studio albums, with selected chart positions and certifications
Title	Details	Peak chart positions	Certification
Title	Details	HUN	Certification
I'm Worse	Released: 15 April 2020; Label: Supermanagement	—	
camouflage	Released: 29 June 2021; Label: Supermanagement	19	
A ló túloldalán (Azahriah x Desh)	Released: 20 May 2022; Label: Supermanagement	1	HUN: 15× Platinum
memento	Released: 1 May 2023; Label: Supermanagement	1	
skatulya I	Released: 18 April 2024; Label: Supermanagement	2	
skatulya II	Released: 17 October 2025; Label: Supermanagement	1	
Aziverzum	Released: 18 October 2025; Label: Supermanagement	2	

=== Live albums ===
List of live albums, with selected chart positions
Title	Details	Peak chart positions
Title	Details	HUN
Papp László Aréna LIVE (2023)	Released: 4 April, 2023; Label: Supermanagement	29
Puskás Aréna Live (2024)	Released: 21 January 2025; Label: Supermanagement	—

=== Extended plays ===
List of extended plays, with selected chart positions
Title	Details	Peak chart positions
Title	Details	HUN
SuperSize (Live Session 2022, Acoustic)	Released: 15 July 2022; Label: Supermanagement	—
silbak	Released: 17 August 2022; Label: Supermanagement	5
tripq	Released: 24 August 2023; Label: Supermanagement	1

=== Singles ===
Year	Song	Highest position							Album
Year	Song	Mahasz						Billboard	Album
Year	Song	Radio Top 40	Editors' Choice	Hungarian Radio Top 40	Dance Top 40	Single Top 40	Stream Top 40	Hungary Songs	Album
2019	"BLiND" (Azahriah & Hundred Sins)	–	–	–	–	–	–	–	Non-album single
2020	"Hathor"	–	–	–	–	–	–	–	Non-album single
2020	"Despair"	–	–	–	–	–	–	–	Non-album single
2020	"COMICAL TRAGEDY" (Azahriah, Hundred Sins)	–	–	–	–	–	–	–	Non-album single
2020	"Nevettale" (Azahriah x Tíkéj & Zilkerson)	–	–	–	–	–	–	–	Non-album single
2020	"RÉT" (Azahriah x Desh)	–	–	–	–	9	7	18	Non-album single
2021	"4K LOVE"	–	–	–	–	22	36	–	Camouflage
2021	"aight"	–	–	–	–	–	22	–	Camouflage
2021	"MIND1" (Azahriah x Desh)	28	–	11	–	4	1	5	A ló túloldalán
2021	"EL BARTO" (Azahriah x Desh)	–	–	–	–	12	6	–	Non-album single
2022	"tevagyazalány" (Azahriah x Desh)	–	–	–	–	–	13	13	A ló túloldalán
2022	"Miafasz" (Azahriah x Desh)	–	–	–	–	7	2	1	A ló túloldalán
2022	"Pullup" (Azahriah x Desh)	–	–	–	–	4	1	1	A ló túloldalán
2022	"Habibi" (Azahriah x Desh)	–	–	–	–	29	7	5	A ló túloldalán
2022	"téveszmék"	–	–	–	–	36	6	4	silbak
2022	"four moods"	27	15	5	4	1	1	1	silbak
2023	"introvertált dal"	34	2	1	1	2	1	1	memento
2023	"szosziazi"	–	–	–	–	2	1	1	memento
2023	"3korty"	34	–	25	6	2	1	1	memento
2023	"Heaven" (with StadiumX and Sam Martin)	26	–	16	–	3	6	7	Non-album single
2023	"Rampapapam" (Desh, Azahriah, Young Fly feat. Lord Panamo)	–	21	8	16	1		1	CARPE DIEM
2023	"valami amerikai"	–	–	12	–	5		6	Non-album single
2023	"Walkin a street" (Desh, Azahriah, Young Fly)	–	–	–	–	–		–	CARPE DIEM
	"cipoe"	–	–	–	–	1		1	
	"mariana.árok"	–	–	–	–	1		1	
