= Ivan & The Parazol =

Hungarian indie-garage rock band

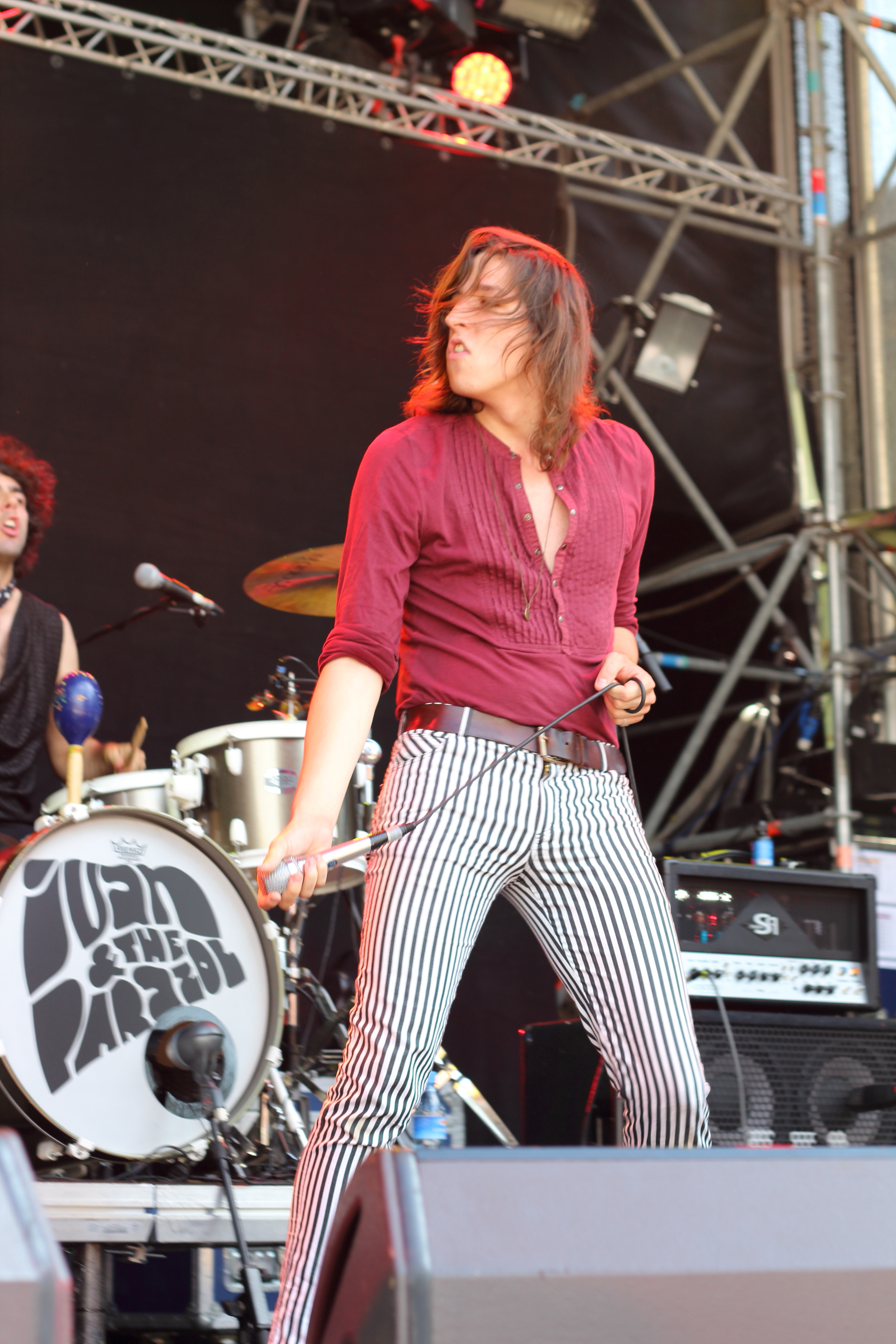

Background information
- Origin: Budapest, Hungary
- Genres: Garage rock, Psychedelic rock, Hard rock
- Years active: 2010-present
- Members: Máté Balla; Bálint Simon; Botond Kalmár; Iván Vitáris; Barna Szőke
- Website: www.ivanandtheparazol.com/

Ivan & The Parazol are a Hungarian indie-garage rock band based in Budapest, Hungary. The band incorporates influences from the 1960s and the 1970s. The band have played hundreds of gigs mainly all over Hungary with Heaven Street Seven and several shows in Europe or in The United States. The band's first hit was Take My Hand, which was a number one song for 10 weeks on the Hungarian national radio station, MR2 Petőfi Rádió.

== History ==
The band was formed by Iván Vitáris (vocals), Máté Balla (guitars), János Tarnai (bass), István Beke (keyboards) and Bálint Simon (drums) in Budapest, Hungary.

In September 2010 the band shot the video called Marshall which resulted their nomination for the Hungarian Music Television in the category of brand new bands.

In October 2011, Ivan & The Parazol shot the video In Air. The song later became a number one song in the Hungarian radio station, Petőfi Rádió.

In January 2012 the band were invited to play an acoustic show at the MR2 Petőfi rádió's MR2 Acoustic series.

In January 2012 the band's first EP entitled Yellow Flavour was released including the Hungarian version of In Air entitled Jól Áll Nekem Az Élet (The Life Suits Me).

In 2014 their song called Together was the official anthem of Sziget Festival.

=== Mama Don't You Recognize Ivan & The Parazol? ===
In August 2012, the band hired Zoltán Takács as the producer of their first full-length studio album. The band recorded their album at the Abnormal Studios in Budapest with László Philipp as recording engineer.

In September 2012 the Drum & Monkey Records released Ivan & The Parazol's first album entitled Mama Don't You Recognize Ivan & The Parazol?. The outlay of the record was designed by Melinda Hujber.

On 13 March 2013, Ivan & The Parazol played at the South by Southwest festival in Austin, Texas, The United States.

On 8 August 2013, Ivan & The Parazol played at the Sziget Festival.

== Band members ==
Current line-up

- Iván Vitáris – lead vocals (2010–present)
- Máté Balla – guitar (2010–present)
- Bálint Simon – drums, percussion (2010–present)
- Botond Kalmár – keyboard (2023–present)
- Barna Szőke – bass guitar (2024–present)

Former members

- János Tarnai – bass guitar (2010–2017)
- István Beke – keyboard (2010–2020)
- Márton Springer – bass guitar (2017–2024)

=== Timeline ===
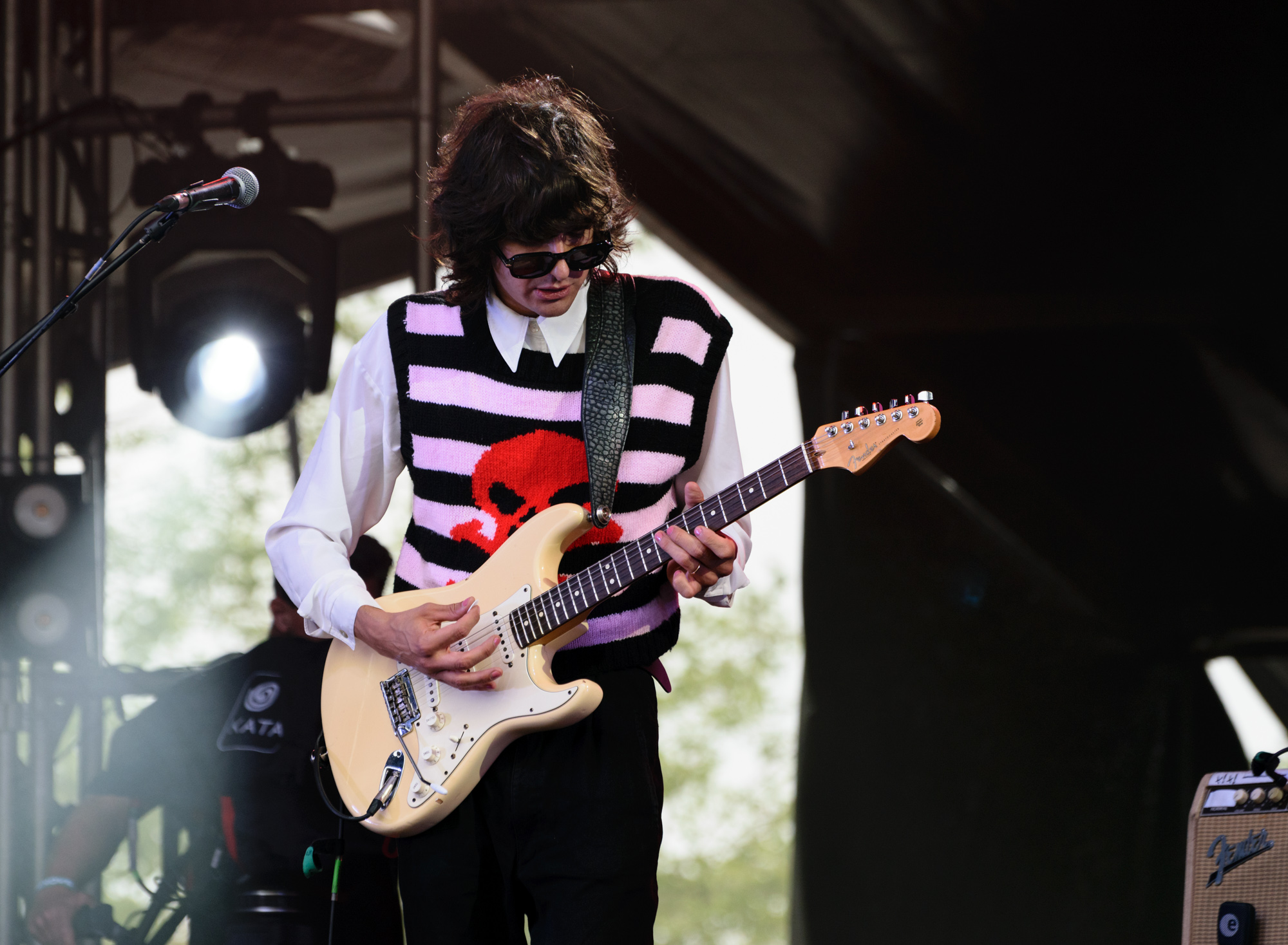
Máté Balla

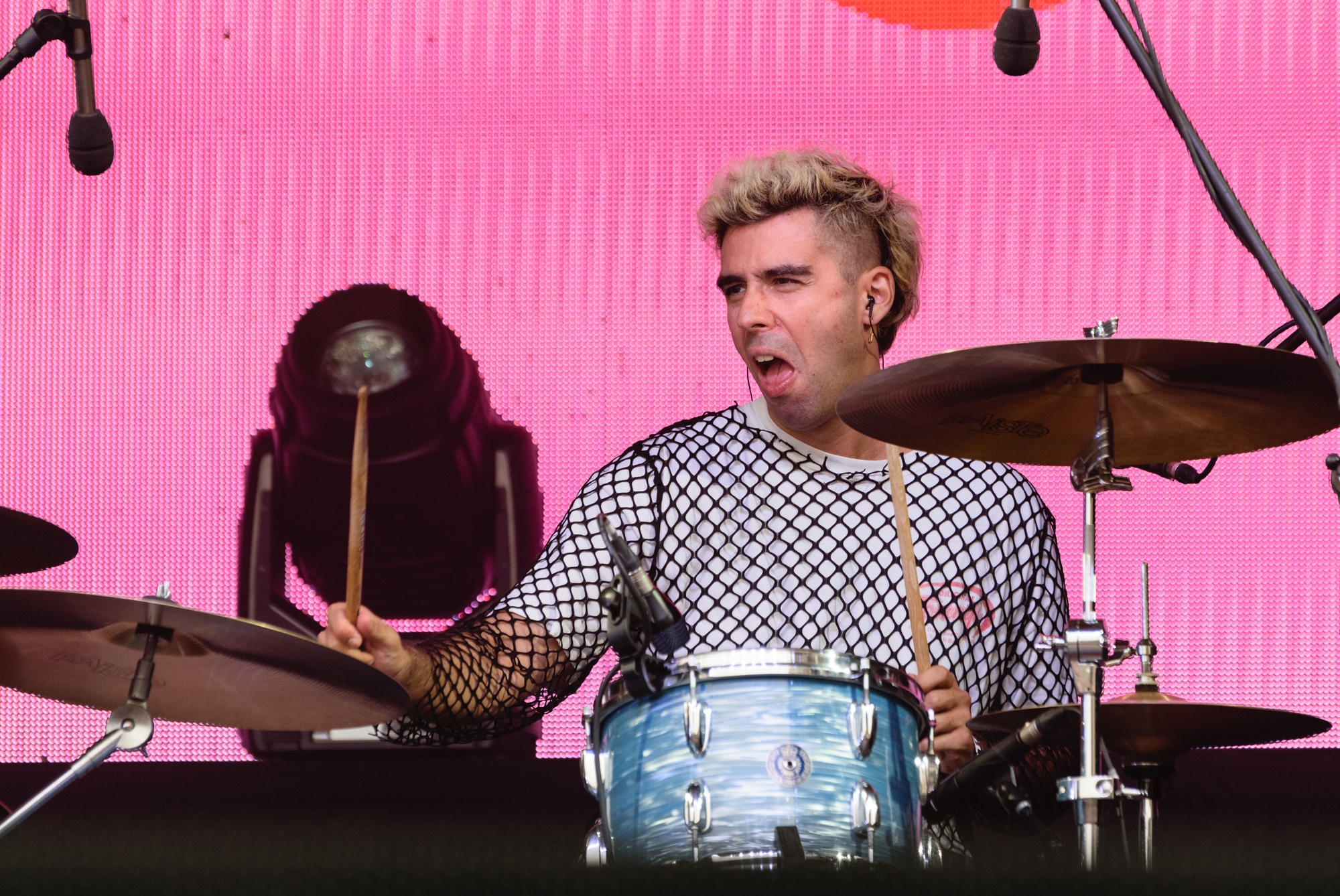
Bálint Simon

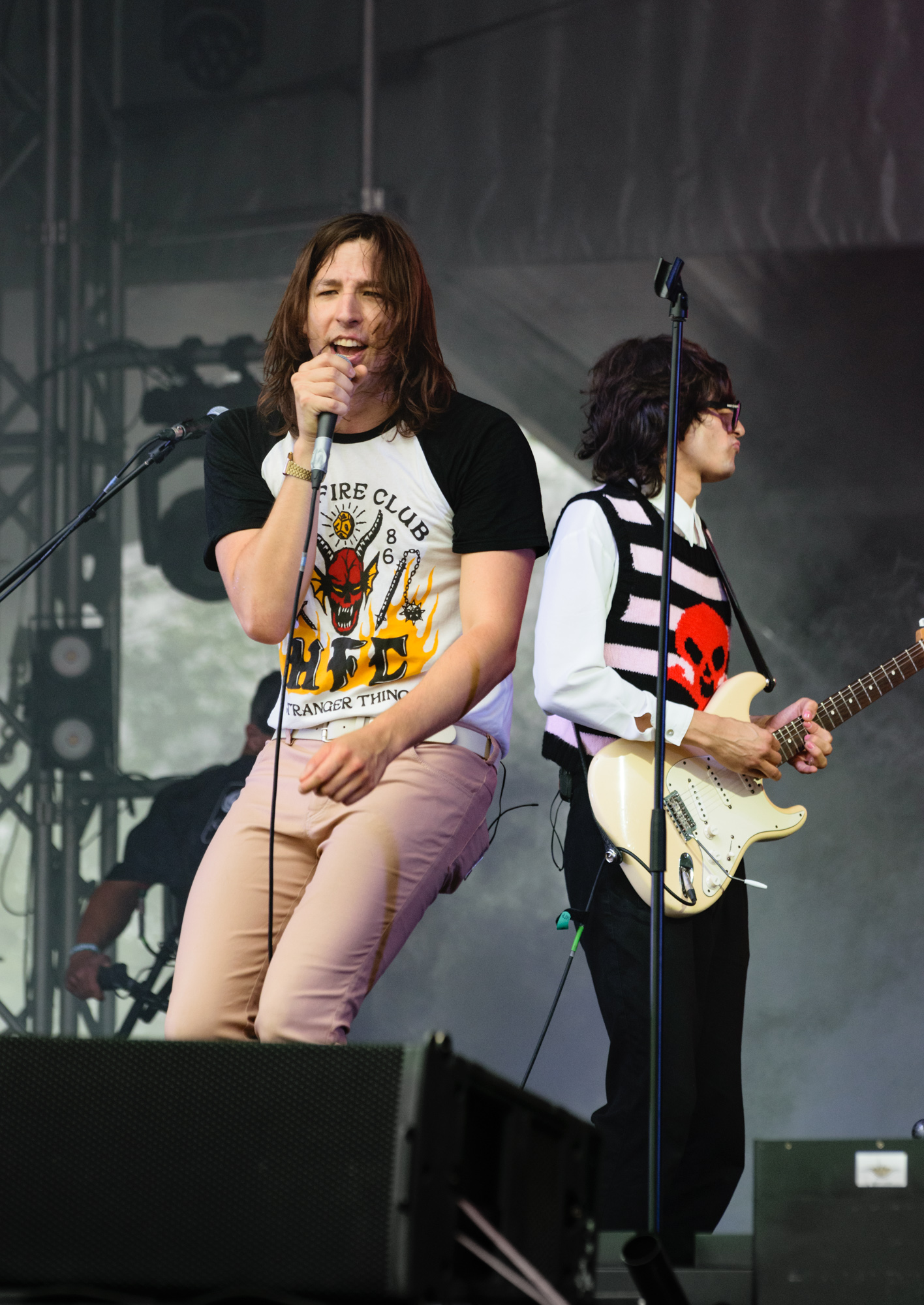
Iván Vitáris

== Discography ==
Ivan & The Parazol discography
- Studio albums: 6
- EPs: 2
- Singles: 26
- Music videos: 21

EPs

- Yellow Flavour (2012)
- Sellin' My Soul (2012)

Albums

- Mama Don't You Recognize Ivan & The Parazol? (2012)
- Mode Bizarre (2014)
- The All Right Nows (2015)
- Exotic Post Traumatic (2019)
- Budai Pop (2021)
- Belle Époque (2025)

== Music videos ==
Year	Title	Director
2010	Marshall	Ambrus Hernádi
2011	In Air	Ambrus Hernádi, Dávid Ebner
2012	Take My Hand	Máté Bögi
2013	Sellin' My Soul	Máté Bögi
2014	Together	?
2014	Love Is Like (Bourbon On the Rocks)	István Balázsy
2015	Jól áll nekem az élet	Ambrus Hernádi
2015	Modernial	Gergely Szirmai
2015	Cold & Deep	Attila Damokos
2018	NR. 1003	Miki357
2019	Changin'	?
2019	When I Was 17	Sinco
2019	Red Bricks	?
2020	Néha kevés, néha több	Attila Hartung
2020	Fejezd be	?
2020	Játék	Barna Szőke
2021	Mást vártam	?
2021	Milyen kár	Bálint Benkő
2021	Kérdőjelek és a válaszok (ft. Carson Coma)	Dóra Szelei
2024	Dancer	Karcsi Spáh, Iván Vitáris
2025	Belle Époque	Karcsi Spáh, Iván Vitáris

== See also ==
- Budapest indie music scene
