= Margaret Island (band) =

Hungarian band

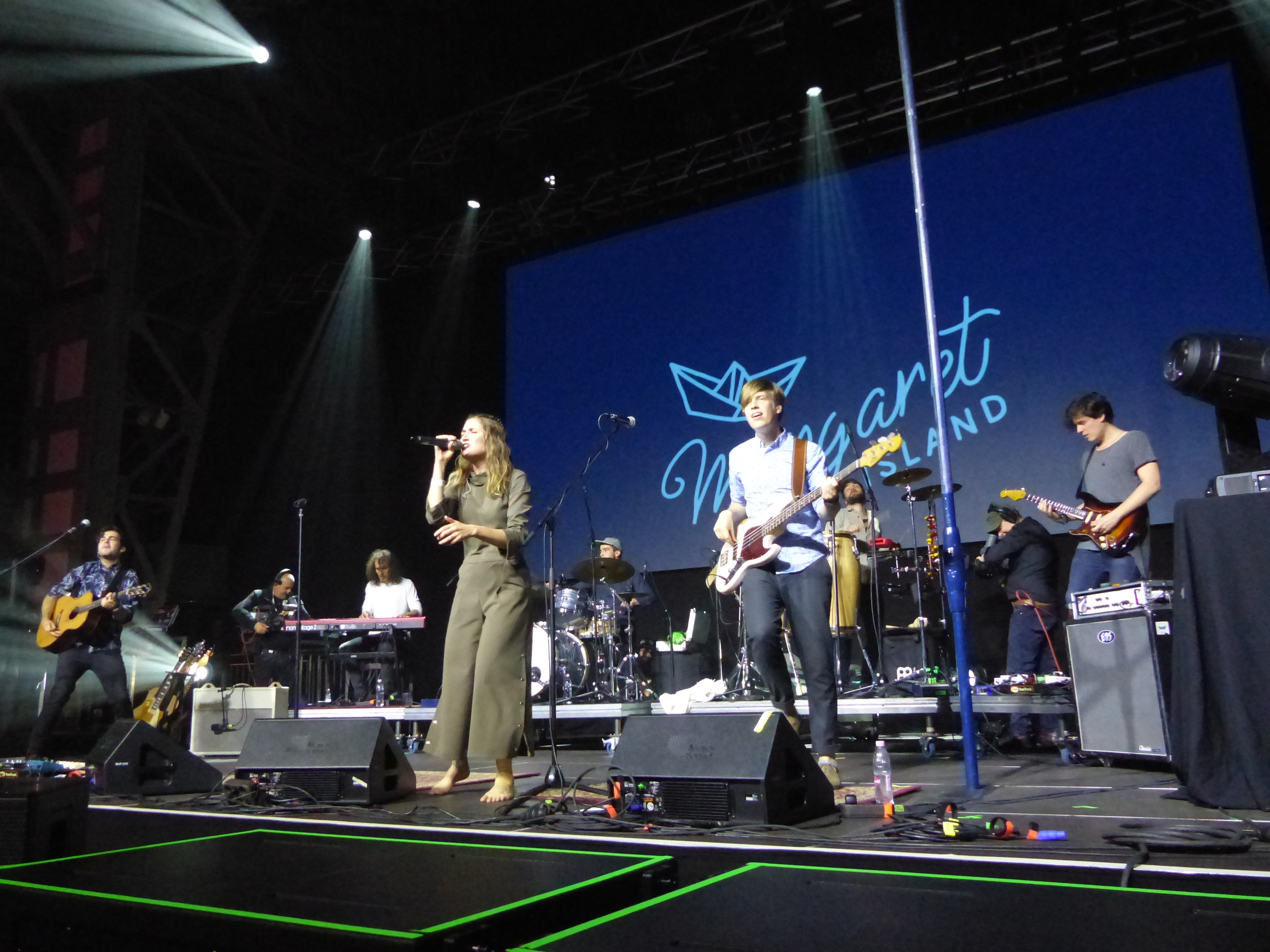
- Margaret Island in 2017

Background information
- Origin: Hungary
- Genres: Indie pop
- Years active: 2014–2025
- Labels: Gold Record
- Members: Viki Lábas; Kristóf Törőcsik; Bálint Füstös; Dániel Gerendás; Kurszán Koltay; Tamás Verók

Margaret Island, founded in 2014, was a Hungarian indie pop band, named after Margaret Island in Budapest. Their pop songs are combined with acoustic and folk elements. Their music is influenced by Mumford & Sons and Passenger. Their first album, Egyszer volt, was released in September 2015. The album includes the song Nem voltál jó, which was originally in English, Soaked in life, later translated to Hungarian by János Bródy. They are currently signed to Gold Record. They performed as the interval act for the first heat for A Dal 2017, the national selection for Hungary in the Eurovision Song Contest 2017, as well as the interval act for the second heat for A Dal 2018.

== Members ==
- Viki Lábas – lead vocals
- Kristóf Törőcsik – bass guitar
- Bálint Füstös – lead guitar
- Péter Kaszás – drums and percussion
- Norbert Bejan – piano
- Tamás Verók – guitar

== Awards ==
- 2014: Our Voice Grand Prix Hungary
- 2014: Joy of Music Award - Breakthrough Performance of the Year musical (Bálint Füstös)
- 2015: Bolyongó was number one for several weeks on Petőfi Rádió.
- 2015: Csillagtalan and Eső were, for several months, high on the hit list of Class FM.
- 2016: Fonogram award - Discovery of the Year - Egyszer volt (Gold Record)
