= List of Pittsburgh performing arts companies and venues =

This list's purpose is to compile a list of Pittsburgh's performing arts companies and venues, past and present.

== A ==
- Academy of Music (also known as Harry Williams' Academy of Music)
- Allegheny Theater (also known as Hazlett Theater within the Carnegie Free Library of Allegheny)
- Alumni Theatre Company (current)
- Alvin Theatre (Pittsburgh)
- Allegheny Repertory Theatre
- American Ibsen Theatre
- Apple Hill Playhouse
- August Wilson Center for African American Culture (current)
- Attack Production (current)
- Avenue Cinema

== B ==
- Bald Theatre Company (current)
- Barebones productions (current)
- Becoming Arts Collective (current)
- Benedum Center (current)
- Black Horizon Theater
- Bricolage Production Company (current)
- Byham Theater (current)

== C ==
- Caravan Theatre of Pittsburgh (current)
- Carnegie Music Hall (current)
- Carnegie Mellon School of Drama (current)
- Carrnivale Theatrics (current)
- Casino Musee
- Center Stage Dinner Theatre
- Characters East Theatre
- City Theatre (Pittsburgh) (current)
- Pittsburgh CLO (current)
- Comtra Theater
- Cultural District, Pittsburgh (current)
- Cup-A-Jo Productions (current)

== D ==
- Dance Alloy
- Davis Theatre
- Duquesne Gardens
- Duquesne Theatre
- Duquesne University Tamburitzans (current)

== E ==
- East End Theatre
- Enright Theatre
- Exposition Park

== F ==
- Fifth Avenue Lyceum
- Fine Line Theatre Company
- Fulton Theatre (now known as the Byham Theater)
- Future Ten (current)

== G ==
- Gayety Theatre (now known as the Byham Theater)
- Gemini Theatre Company (current)
- Grand Opera House
- Greensburg Civic Theatre (current)
- Grey Box Theatre (current)

== H ==
- Harris Theater (Pittsburgh) (current)
- Harry Williams' Academy of Music
- Hartwood Theatre on the Green
- Hazlett Theater (also known as Allegheny Theater within the Carnegie Free Library of Allegheny)
- Heinz Hall (current)
- Hiawatha Project (current)
- The Hillman Center for Performing Arts at Shady Side Academy

== I ==
- Ironclad Agreement Theatre Company
- Iron Horse Theatre Company (Ambridge)

== J ==
- Jewish Theatre of Pittsburgh
- Joe Negri Auditorium (current)

== K ==
- Kelly-Strayhorn Theater (current)
- Klopfer's Hall
- Kresge Theatre (current)
- Kuntu Repertory Theatre

== L ==
- Laurel Highlands Regional Theatre
- Library Hall
- Little Lake (current)
- Lovelace Theatre

== M ==
- Mckeesport Little Theater
- Mutable Theatrics (current)

== N ==
- 99¢ Floating Theater
- New Group Theater
- New Hazlett Theater (also known as Allegheny Theater within the Carnegie Free Library of Allegheny) (current)
- New Product Company (current)
- Nixon Theatre
- No Name Players (current)

== O ==
- O'Reilly Theater (current)
- Odd Chair Playhouse
- Off the Wall Productions (current)
- Open Stage Theatre (current)
- Opera Theatre of Pittsburgh (Now Pittsburgh Festival Opera) (current)
- Organic Theater Pittsburgh (current)

== P ==
- Penn Theatre
- Phase 3 Productions (current)
- Pitt Theatre
- Pittsburgh Ballet (current)
- Pittsburgh Black Theatre Dance Ensemble
- Pittsburgh Creative and Performing Arts School (current)
- Pittsburgh Dance Council (current)
- Pittsburgh Irish and Classical Theatre (current)
- Pittsburgh Laboratory Theatre
- Pittsburgh Metropolitan Stage Company
- Pittsburgh Musical Theater (current)
- Pittsburgh New Works Festival (current)
- Pittsburgh Opera
- Pittsburgh Playhouse (current)
- Pittsburgh Playwrights Theatre Company (current)
- Pittsburgh Public Theater (current)
- Pittsburgh Savoyards (current)
- Pittsburgh Theatre
- Prime Stage Theatre

== Q ==
- Quantum Theatre (current)

== R ==
- Red Barn Theatre
- Red Masquers (current)

== S ==
- Schenley Theatre
- St. Vincent's College
- Sheridan Square Theatre
- Sherwood Forest Theatre
- Soho Repertory Theatre
- South Park Conservatory Theatre
- Squonk Opera (current)
- Stage 62
- Stage & Steel Productions (current)
- Stage Right (Pittsburgh) (current)
- Stanley Theatre (also known as the Benedum Center)
- Stephen Foster Memorial (current)
- Summer Company (current)
- Syria Mosque

== T ==
- Terra Nova Theatre Group (current)
- Theatre Express
- Theatre Factory
- Theatre Sans Serif (current)
- Theatre Urge
- Throughline Theatre Company (current)
- Tivoli Garden
- Trimble's Varieties Theatre

== U ==
- Ujima Theatre
- University of Pittsburgh Stages (current)
- Unseam'd Shakespeare Company (current)
- Upstairs Theatre

== V ==
- Vigilance Theatre Group

== W ==
- William Penn Playhouse

== See also ==
- Theatre in Pittsburgh
