= Stage Right! =

American theatre company and school

Stage Right! is a professional theatre company and performing arts school located in Greensburg, Pennsylvania. Established in 1998 as an organization for young people to take classes in musical theatre by Chris Rizk, Stage Right! also became a professional theatre company in 1999, established by artistic director Anthony Marino, Rizk's brother. The company produces a full season of musicals, utilizing professional actors from the Pittsburgh theatre scene as well as students from their classes.

In spring 2013, Stage Right moved its studio a few blocks to a larger space at 105 W Fourth Street, Greensburg.

The season is supplemented with many other opportunities to utilize the talents of the students, including an "all-county musical" featuring students from local high school theatre programs, children's plays, summer camp productions, and Books Come Alive!, a series of adaptations of children's books performed at libraries throughout the area. The company is also notable for its annual production of The Rocky Horror Show every Halloween. Many of Stage Right!'s students have had success in Pittsburgh Public Theater's Shakespeare Monologue and Scene Contest, as well as going on to well-respected college theatre programs such as Carnegie Mellon University, Point Park University, New York University, Seton Hill University, Syracuse University, and Shenandoah University. Stage Right! alums have also had success in professional theatre, working in such venues as York Theatre, Off the Wall Productions, Bricolage Production Company, Pittsburgh Irish and Classical Theatre, Prime Stage Theatre, Pittsburgh Civic Light Opera, Pittsburgh Musical Theater, St. Vincent Summer Theatre, City Theatre, Terra Nova Theatre Group, MCC Theater, and 12 Peers Theater, as well as having had their work featured in the Pittsburgh New Works Festival.

== Guinness world record holder ==
Stage Right! earned the Guinness word record for fastest theatrical production on March 9, 2019 by staging a production of "Children of Eden" from start to finish in 14 hours and 30 minutes. The production beat the previous world record held by the Sharpe Academy of Theatre Arts for its 15-hour production of Annie.

== Mistreatment allegations ==
In 2021 a group called Stage Right Survivors had collected alleged firsthand accounts of "bullying, misconduct, manipulation, and retaliation", perpetrated by one founding employee whose behavior (according to the aforementioned critics) was not checked by the school's leadership. The school's Board of Directors was quoted as saying, "We take these allegations seriously and are conducting an investigation to ensure that we can safely provide this creative outlet for more than 300 children in our community." Several months later, that founding employee was no longer working for the company.

== See also ==
Theatre in Pittsburgh
