= Joshua Elijah Reese =

American actor (born 1984)

- Born: Joshua Elijah Reese; July 14, 1984 (age 41); Pittsburgh, Pennsylvania, United States
- Occupation: Actor
- Years active: 2000s–present
- Website: www.joshuaelijahreese.com

Joshua Elijah Reese (born July 14, 1984) is an American actor.

== Early life ==
Joshua Elijah Reese was born and raised in Pittsburgh, Pennsylvania. As a child, he enjoyed performing with his elementary and middle school choirs. In high school, he had aspirations of pursuing a variety of sports especially basketball. The dream ended when he failed to make the school’s basketball team. He was disappointed but encouraged by his English teacher to audition for the annual high school musical. He landed a role and has never looked back. Throughout his high school experience, he had the opportunity to play increasingly challenging roles, including the character Baker in Into the Woods. The role earned him a Best Actor nomination from the Pittsburgh Civic Light Opera’s Gene Kelly Awards. Reese is a graduate of Perry Traditional Academy high school (Pittsburgh Perry) and earned his Bachelor of Fine Arts degree in Theatre from Point Park University.

== Career ==
He started his professional acting career while still in college performing in numerous theatrical stage productions in Pittsburgh's theatre scene: City Theatre (The Brothers Size; Flight), Pittsburgh Public Theater (Ain’t Misbehavin’), Pittsburgh Irish and Classical Theatre (Julius Caesar), Pittsburgh Playwrights Theatre Company (James McBride; Corps Values; A Question of Taste; Jitney), and Kuntu Repertory Theatre (Sarafina).

In 2007, he attained his first television role in The Kill Point, an eight episode television series that is distinguished as the first original drama to air on Spike TV. He played the key role of Derzius, a US Marine recently returned from serving in Iraq. The series follows the action that ensues when Derzius, along with his marine cohorts, attempt to pull off a major bank heist. The next year, Reese played the character of Billick in the indie-thriller film Homecoming starring Mischa Barton. The film has become an instant cult classic. In 2009, Reese was named one of the Young Pittsburghers to watch by the Pittsburgh Post-Gazette. The same year he filmed two movies, the independent film Trapped and the Twentieth Century Fox film Unstoppable starring Denzel Washington.

Reese returned to the stage in 2010, starring in the world premiere of playwright Cori Thomas’ When January Feels Like Summer at the Pittsburgh City Theatre which won the Elizabeth Osborn New Play Award for an emerging playwright. In the spring, he took on the role of Darnell aka Youngblood in his first August Wilson production, Jitney, with the Pittsburgh Playwrights Theatre Company. Later that summer, he played the role of Ogun Size in the west coast premiere of playwright Tarell Alvin McCraney’s The Brothers Size at the Magic Theatre (San Francisco, California). It is the second time that Reese will appear in a production of The Brothers Size. He played Elegba in the Pittsburgh City Theatre production.

He appeared in Val Kilmer’s independent film Riddle and the film One for the Money starring Katherine Heigl.

In 2016, he portrayed a Korean translator on the "Ken Learns Korean" episode of Ken Jeong's "Dr. Ken". Clips of his performance went viral in Korea approximately a decade later. Commenters praised not just his pronunciation, but his culturally appropriate gestures; many assumed he must be partially Korean. On the Talk To Me In Korean podcast, he denied any Korean heritage, and discussed how he had learned the language as an adult.

== Filmography ==
- Homecoming (2009) - Billick
- Trapped (2009) - Detective Jimmy Ingraham
- Unstoppable (2010) - Young Engineer
- Riddle (2010) - Deputy Clark
- One for the Money (2012) - Deputy
- The Dark Knight Rises (2012) - Mercenary at City Hall

== Television credits ==
- The Kill Point (2007) (TV series) - Derzius
- Three Rivers (2009) (TV pilot) - EMT
- Dr. Ken (2016) (TV series) - Troy
