= Barbara Russell =

American actress (1933–2018)

- Born: June 16, 1933; Black Lick, Pennsylvania
- Died: August 25, 2018 (aged 85); Pittsburgh, Pennsylvania
- Occupations: Television actress, film actress, theatre performer, singer
- Notable work: Mister Rogers' Neighborhood
- Spouse: Edwin M. Grentz
- Children: Aaron Russell; Joanna (Albert) Caruso; Caroline Caruso (granddaughter); Michael Caruso (grandson)
- Relatives: Joan Mazziotti Kimmel (sister); Mary Mazziotti (sister); Joseph Mazziotti Jr. (brother); Richard Mazziotti (brother); Robert Mazziotti (brother)

Barbara Russell (June 16, 1933 - August 25, 2018) was an American film and television actress, theatre performer and singer. She was known for starring in a variety of films and television shows, the most notable being Mister Rogers' Neighborhood, appearing in over a dozen episodes. She was also known for her extensive work in the Pittsburgh theatre scene and for her decades-long partnership with Don Brockett as the comedy duo "Brockett and Barbara".

== Early life ==
Barbara Russell was born on June 16, 1933, in Black Lick, Pennsylvania. She had two sisters and three brothers and maintained close ties to her family growing up. When she moved out of her parents' house, she lived across from her sister, Joan, which strengthened family connections. She attended Wilkinsburg High School before pursuing higher education at Indiana University of Pennsylvania, from which she graduated in 1954. In 2000, Indiana University of Pennsylvania recognized her contributions with its Distinguished Alumni Award.

== Career ==
=== Stage career in Pittsburgh ===
Barbara Russell was a popular presence on Pittsburgh stages for six decades, beginning her theater career at the Pittsburgh Playhouse in Oakland. She performed at numerous regional venues throughout her career, including City Theatre, Theatre at Hartwood, Pittsburgh CLO, Pittsburgh Musical Theater, and Pittsburgh Irish and Classical Theatre. Russell maintained a particularly long association with the Mountain Playhouse in Jennerstown, where she began performing in 1960 and remained a regular performer until 2016. She returned to the venue in 1995 to portray Dolly Levi in Thornton Wilder's The Matchmaker. Her final two theatrical roles were in the productions Nana’s Naughty Knickers and Social Security at the Mountain Playhouse in 2016, with audiences reportedly flocking to the shows specifically to see her perform. In addition to her acting work, Russell created and presented educational comedy programs for elementary school and pre-kindergarten children in Pittsburgh for many years, portraying different character roles such as Miss Minni Drama.

=== Partnership with Don Brockett ===
Barbara Russell formed a long-running comedy partnership with Don Brockett that began in 1960 at the Mountain Playhouse where Brockett served as choreographer for the production of Paint Your Wagon. Brockett first met Barbara at the Pittsburgh Playhouse in Oakland and decided to pair up with her as a comedy duo. The pair established themselves as the comedy duo Brockett and Barbara, performing together for over 30 years, specializing in musical comedy revues and satirical sketches that often lampooned Pittsburgh life and culture, and earning a devoted local following. Among their notable revue titles was Last Polka in Pittsburgh. In 1963, the duo released the album Out of Folkus. Their performances extended beyond Pittsburgh, including appearances in New York City. The satirical revues and comedy routines of Brockett and Barbara remained a staple of Pittsburgh theater for many years.

=== Film and television roles ===
Russell was a recurring performer on Mister Rogers' Neighborhood and its predecessor series, contributing memorable comedic characters from the show's earliest days such as Mrs. Russellite, the eccentric lampshade collector who modeled lampshade hats in three episodes between 1966 and 1967, appearing in 14 episodes total through the series' airing. Her work on Mister Rogers' Neighbourhood highlighted her comedic talent and brought delight to young audiences nationwide. Following her death in 2018, Fred Rogers' widow Joanne Rogers remembered her fondly, stating she was "one of the most brilliant ladies in my life" and praising both "the comedy life she lived" and her dedication as an educator. Her appearances on television complemented her broader commitment to educational programming for Pittsburgh's elementary and pre-kindergarten children. Russell also appeared in a variety of supporting and guest roles in film and television productions starring as a zombie in George A. Romero's horror film Day of the Dead (1985), Nicholas' mother in the thriller Narrow Margin (1990), a female traveller in Money for Nothing (1993), and Rosa Lombardi, the mother of the lead character in That's Amore, the latter being her final film completed in 2018 and released after her death. Her appearances in feature films reflected her occasional work in screen projects, often in small parts, alongside her primary focus on Pittsburgh stage performances.

== Personal life and death ==
Russell married her longtime partner, Edwin M. Grentz, and had two children as well as two grandchildren. Russell was remembered for nurturing lifelong friendships and infusing her relationships with warmth and laughter. In her later years, she took up playing the ukulele and enjoyed performing old-time songs. Russell died on August 25, 2018 in Pittsburgh, Pennsylvania at the age of 85 after receiving a cancer diagnosis mere weeks earlier. Her sister Joan Mazziotti Kimmel said that Russell had passed away "after a life very, very well-lived". Kimmel added that Russell loved those around her and thought of each as one of her very best friends, emphasizing that she had more friends than anyone else she knew and kept them from childhood, school, theater, and the neighborhood without ever losing any. A memorial service took place on August 30, 2018, at Odell Robinson Funeral Home on the North Side of Pittsburgh.

== Discography ==
- Swing with Me (1960, conducted by Don Costa)
- Golden Blues (1961)
- The Sounds From Jazzland At The New York World's Fair (1964, with the Al Beldini Trio)
- Swing with Me/Golden Blues (2015 compilation album)
- Mack the Knife/By Myself (with Mort Lindsey)
- Like the Honey for the Bee/Shake Hands with a Fool
- The Best Of Swing N' Jive: Bootin' Boogie Blues (compilation CD)

== Filmography ==
Television

- Mister Rogers' Neighborhood - Mrs. Russellite, Barbara Boomerang, Barbara B. Frisbee, Posie Elephant, Mrs. Hilda Dingleborder
- Danger Bay - Marta Larsen
- Neon Rider - Mrs. Farrell
- Max Glick - Actress
- MacGyver - Nurse Krandall
- The New Steve Allen Show (1961) - Guest
- Springtime with Mr. Rogers (1979) - Self

Film

- Day of the Dead - Featured zombie
- Silent Witness (TV movie) - Customer #1
- That Secret Sunday (TV movie) - Eve
- The Kid Brother - Woman 1
- Christmas Comes to Willow Creek (TV movie) - Edna Mae
- The First Season - Ruth Kelsey
- Narrow Margin - Nicholas' mother
- Money for Nothing - Female traveler
- That's Amore - Rosa Lombardi (posthumous release, final film role)
- Coming Clean (The Untold Story of Project Paper Moon) (2019) - Edith Golova (archive footage)
