= University of Pittsburgh Stages =

American production company

Pitt Stages
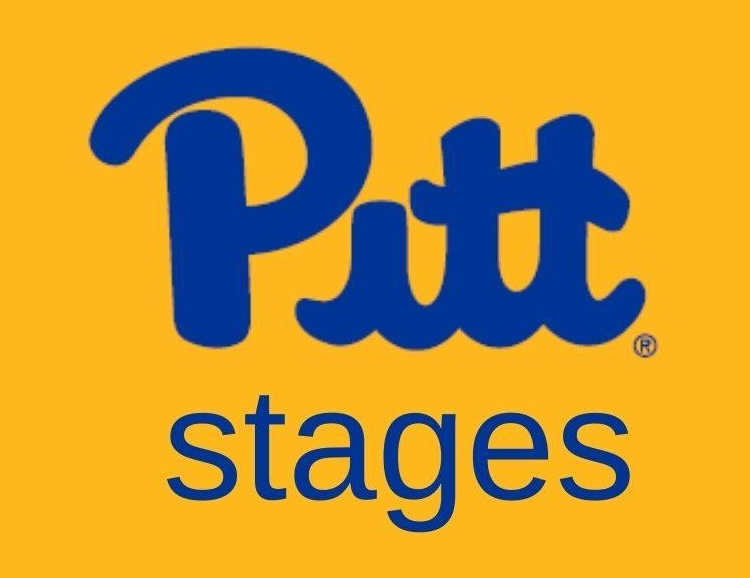
- Pitt Stages
- Type: Theatre group
- Purpose: repertory
- Location: Pittsburgh, PA
- Website: http://www.play.pitt.edu

University of Pittsburgh Stages or Pitt Stages, previously known as the or University of Pittsburgh Repertory Theatre or Pitt Rep, is the flagship production company for the University of Pittsburgh Department of Theatre Arts. Pitt Stages features students on stage with professional actors and teaching artists staging public performances of classic masterpieces, contemporary productions, and student-directed labs. The company's primary performance spaces include the university's Stephen Foster Memorial and Cathedral of Learning.

== History ==
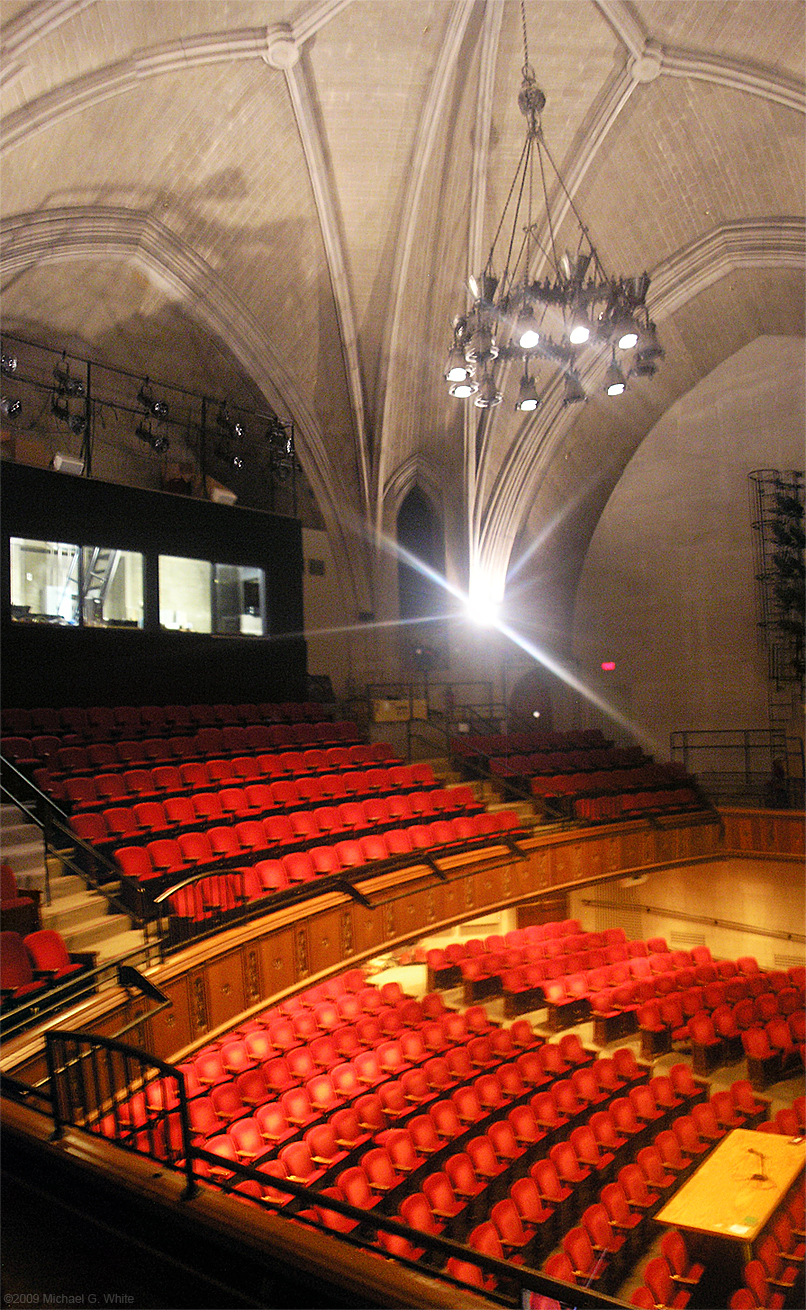
Pitt Stages' largest performance space, the 478-seat Charity Randall Theatre in the Stephen Foster Memorial

=== Thespian Society ===
The heritage of theatre at the University of Pittsburgh stretches back to at least 1810 when the Thespian Society was organized by students of the forerunner of the university, the Pittsburgh Academy, in order to stage popular comedies and musical entertainment. These students included Henry Marie Brackenridge, the son of university founder Hugh Henry Brackenridge; Morgan Neville, the son of Presley Neville; and future U.S. Congressman and Senator William Wilkins. The club staged their first production, Who Wants a Guinea?, at the Drury Theatre at Third and Smithfield streets in downtown Pittsburgh. This club was frequently mentioned by travelers commenting on the early culture of Pittsburgh, however it was disbanded by university faculty in 1833 because, according to Agnes Starrett's 1937 history of the university, "instead of Shakespeare, the members had begun to produce vulgar modern comedies". After the school progressed to university status, student organized dramatic theater would continue under various names and incarnations.

=== Cap and Gown Club ===
Musical theatre at the university has its origins when the school was named the Western University of Pennsylvania, then commonly referred to as "WUP". On January 15, 1908, the Cap and Gown Club was founded by John S. Ashbrook and Charles R. Porter, along with students, graduates, and faculty of the Dental Department. The club was the first dramatic group at the university and staged original, all-male, musical comedies often with themes of local or university interest. The first production by the group was In Wupland, which was staged at Pittsburgh's Nixon Theater on April 24, 1908, followed by another performance at the Duquesne Theater on May 23, 1908. Early members of the group included George M. Kirk who, after the school changed its name to the University of Pittsburgh in July, 1908, penned the lyrics to the university's fight song, "Hail to Pitt", for a production of the club's Here or There at the Carnegie Music Hall in the spring of 1910. The increasing recognition and reputation of the club in the 1910s precipitated multiple performances of its productions and the touring of areas outside of the city into the surrounding areas of Western Pennsylvania as far away as Altoona and Erie, as well as in Youngstown, Ohio and Jamestown, New York. By 1929, the club's productions had become so profitable (some of the profit was directed into the Alumni Hall Building Fund), and had gained such a level of importance, that the graduate club configuration was no longer sufficient to run the club. Therefore, a corporate charter was obtained from the state in order to reorganized the club's structure with club founder Ashbrook (D.D.S. 1911) elected as its first president. Among the Cap and Gown club's alumni were Hollywood stars Dutch Hendrian, Regis Toomey and Gene Kelly, along with Kelly's brother Fred, who became an influential choreographer and television producer and director. Following his graduation in 1933, Gene Kelly remained active with the Cap and Gown Club, serving as its director from 1934 to 1938. The club's 1938 production, Pickets, Please!, featured the debut of the university's other major spirit song, the "Pitt Victory Song". The club thrived for 34 consecutive years before it became dormant in 1942 due to the entrance of the United States into World War II. Following the war, the club was revived in 1946 and staged a production in December of that year, followed by its 36th and final production in 1947, although it lingered on as a club until 1978.

=== Pitt Players to Pitt Stages ===
The logo used by Pitt Stages when it was known as the University of Pittsburgh Repertory Theatre incorporated the gothic, double doors of the Stephen Foster Memorial which houses two of its performance venues

In 1916, simultaneous with the growing popularity of the Cap and Gown Club, another extracurricular student club, the Pitt Players, was organized as a co-ed theatrical group that focused on more serious, non-musical dramatic presentations. The Pitt Players was organized by George M. Baird, who along with also being known for writing the lyrics to the University of Pittsburgh Alma Mater, was active in many of the aspects of the group's productions. Although most of the university's programs in theatre were transferred to Carnegie Tech during the administration of Chancellor John Bowman in order to avoid duplication of that school's efforts, the Pitt Players, supported by the Theatron honorary dramatic fraternity, evolved to put on multiple theatrical productions each year. Its 1947 production of Joan of Lorraine, the first off-Broadway presentation of the play, received national publicity on Fred Waring's radio program. Later that year, both the Cap and Gown Club and the Pitt Players came under the direction of Harvey J. Pope, who arrived at Pitt from Northwestern University Workshop Theater to serve as a permanent dramatic coach at Pitt and as a faculty member of the speech and drama departments. Following their 1947 show, the Cap and Gown Club became inactive and the Pitt Players sought to widen the scope of their productions, which came to include musicals.

Pitt Stages used a gold curtain design in their logo from 2013 to 2023.

In 1961, the university's Speech Department presented its first public production stemming from its dramatic theatre class, "Theatre 11". The play, Eugene O'Neill's The Hairy Ape, was held in early October in the Cathedral of Learning room 1126. It was thus during the early 1960s, with the university now providing theatre training and production through its Department of Speech, that the Pitt Players, having common theatrical coaches and staff with university's academic theatre program, disappeared as a separate entity as it melded into the Department of Speech and Theater Arts' University Theatre, although casts of the University Theatre's productions were still often popularly referred to as the "Pitt Players". The University Theatre, which became known as Pitt Theatre, became professionally oriented in 1981, and the Division of Theatre Arts of the Department of Speech and Theater Arts was spun off into a new department of the university, the Department of Theatre Arts, on October 21, 1982. The department's theatre group was then renamed to the University of Pittsburgh Repertory Theatre in 1999 and then to its current moniker, University of Pittsburgh Stages, prior to the Fall semester of 2013, and now primarily uses the name "Pitt Stages".

== Performance spaces ==
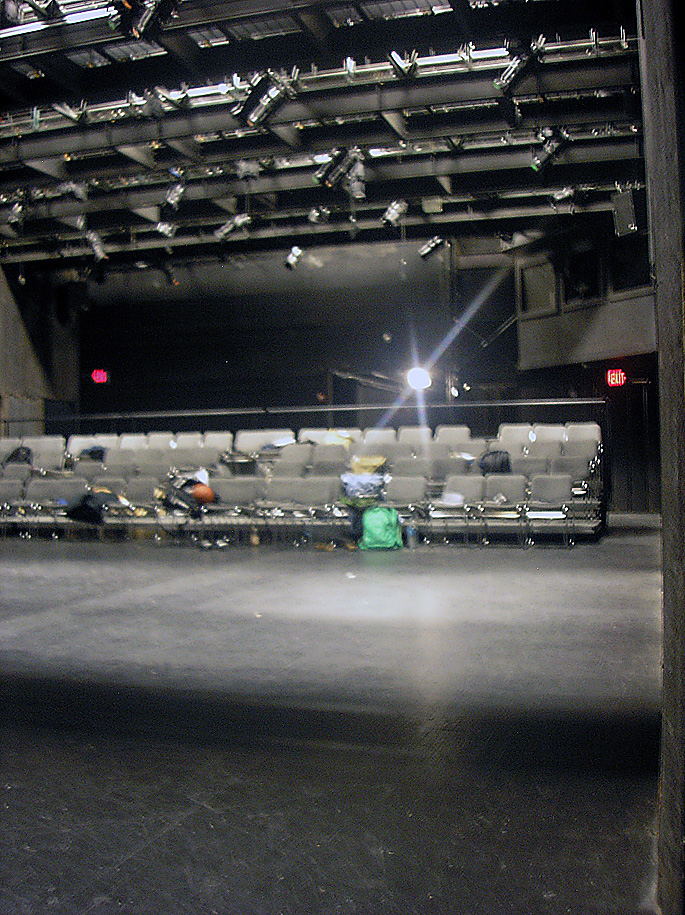
Pitt Stages' black box space is the Studio Theatre located in the lower level of the Cathedral of Learning

University of Pittsburgh Stages has three primary performance spaces of various configurations and sizes, with the two largest located in the historic Stephen Foster Memorial. At 478 seats, the Charity Randall Theatre is the largest space, followed by the 151-seat Henry Heymann Theatre on the memorial's lower level. The third space is the black box Studio Theatre located in the lower level of the adjacent Cathedral of Learning near the Department of Theatre Art's training classrooms and costume, scene, and properties shops.

=== Charity Randall Theatre ===
The university's main 478-seat traditional proscenium theater, located in the Stephen Foster Memorial and formerly known as the Foster Memorial Theatre, was renamed as the Charity Randall Theatre following a $2 million renovation in 2003. The theater was reconditioned to bring it up to code, update its equipment, and replicate the original conditions of the auditorium's features. These renovations were undertaken with donations from the Charity Randall Foundation which was established in 1977 to remember the sister of Pitt graduate and businessman Robert Randall and to support her interest in the arts after her death in a car accident. The plush, deep red seats, identical to those first installed New York's Radio City Music Hall, were reupholstered and their wrought iron frames and oak arms refinished to their original 1930s condition. The number of seats were reduced from 572 to 478, including the addition of 24 new freestanding balcony seats. Other auditorium improvements include new carpeting and new lighting that highlights the vaulted stone ceiling, as well as a restoration of the original Samuel Yellin designed chandelier. In addition, state-of-the-art sound, lighting, and production equipment was added, as well as a new rigging system, actors' restroom, and various stage improvements. Pittsburgh Irish and Classical Theatre has staged many productions in this space.

=== Henry Heymann Theatre ===
The downstairs of the Stephen Foster Memorial houses the 153-seat Henry Heymann Theatre, featuring a thrust stage with seating on three sides. The theater honors the university's longtime scenic designer, and theater donor, Henry Heymann, who taught scenic design from 1968 until he retired in 1993. The Heymann Theatre was created in 2000 in a space that formerly served as the memorial's social room, which hosted USO dances during World War II. A little-known tunnel also extends from the Heymann Theatre to under the loading dock level of the Cathedral of Learning, connecting the two buildings. During the 2003 renovations to the memorial, the downstairs dressing room area was reconfigured to accommodate three "star" dressing rooms and men's and women's showers. Pittsburgh Irish and Classical Theatre has also staged many productions in this space.

=== Richard E. Rauh Studio Theater ===
The Richard E. Rauh Studio Theatre, located in the lower level of the Cathedral of Learning in Room 72, is a typical black box theater in that it is a square, unadorned room with black walls, a flat floor, and chairs that can be moved or removed to accommodate a particular production. It was originally designed in the early 1960s by Ned Bowman, associate professor of Speech and Theatre Arts. It is home to student-directed laboratory productions, play readings, Dark Night Cabaret, and plays host to Pittsburgh's longest-running theater show, Friday Nite Improvs, started in 1989 by graduate theatre students. This space has also been home to productions by Unseam'd Shakespeare Company and Cup-A-Jo Productions. In 2017 the Studio Theatre was named in honor of Pitt alumnus Richard E. Rauh who donated $1 million to support it and the university's theater productions.

== Alumni ==
- Harvey Harman
- Dutch Hendrian
- Gene Kelly
- Allison McAtee
- George McLaren
- Regis Toomey

== See also ==
- Kuntu Repertory Theatre
- Friday Night Improvs
- Theatre in Pittsburgh
