= Theatre in Pittsburgh =

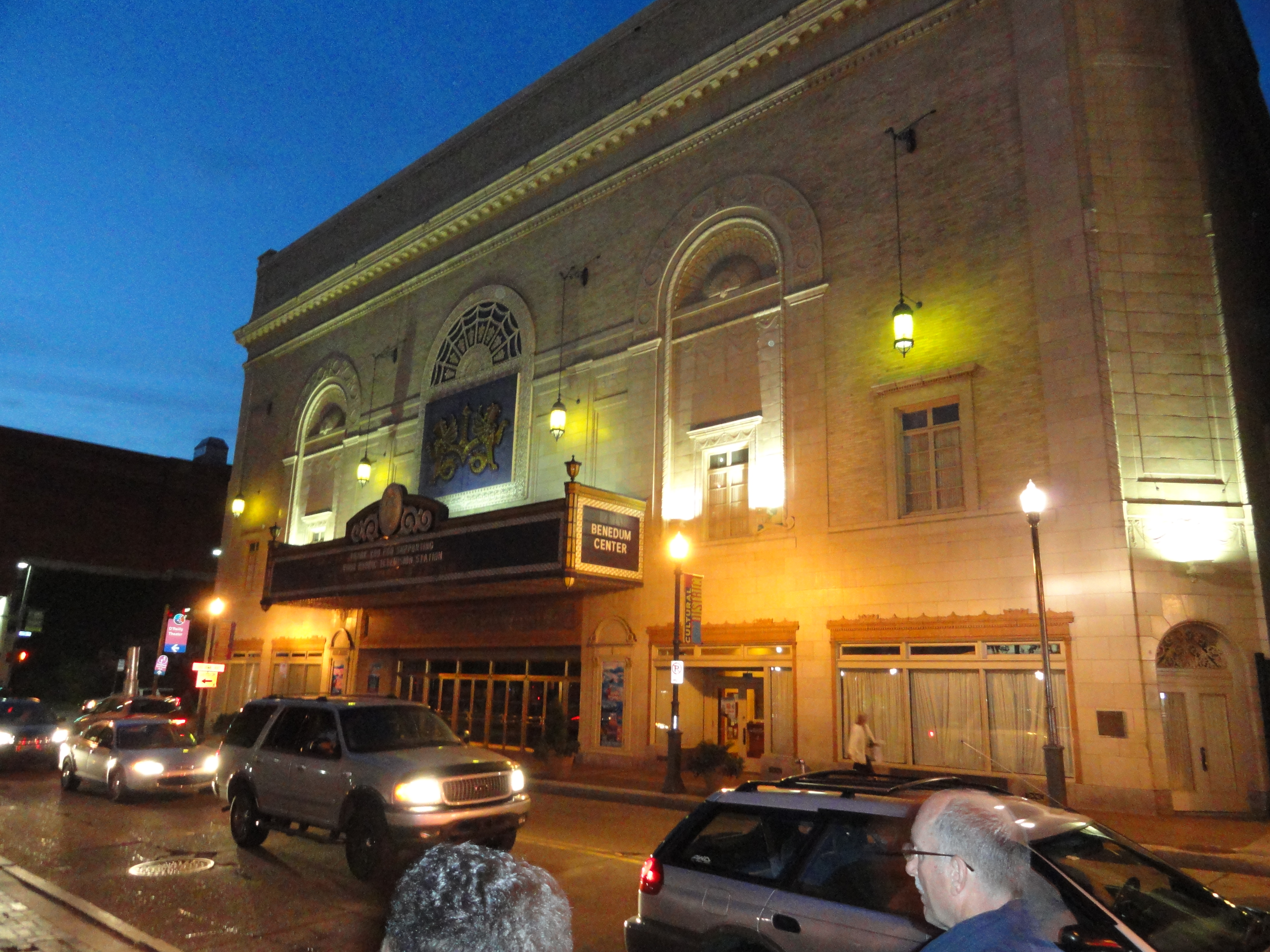
Benedum Center

Theater in Pittsburgh has existed professionally since the early 1800s and has continued to expand, having emerged as an important cultural force in the city over the past several decades.

== History ==
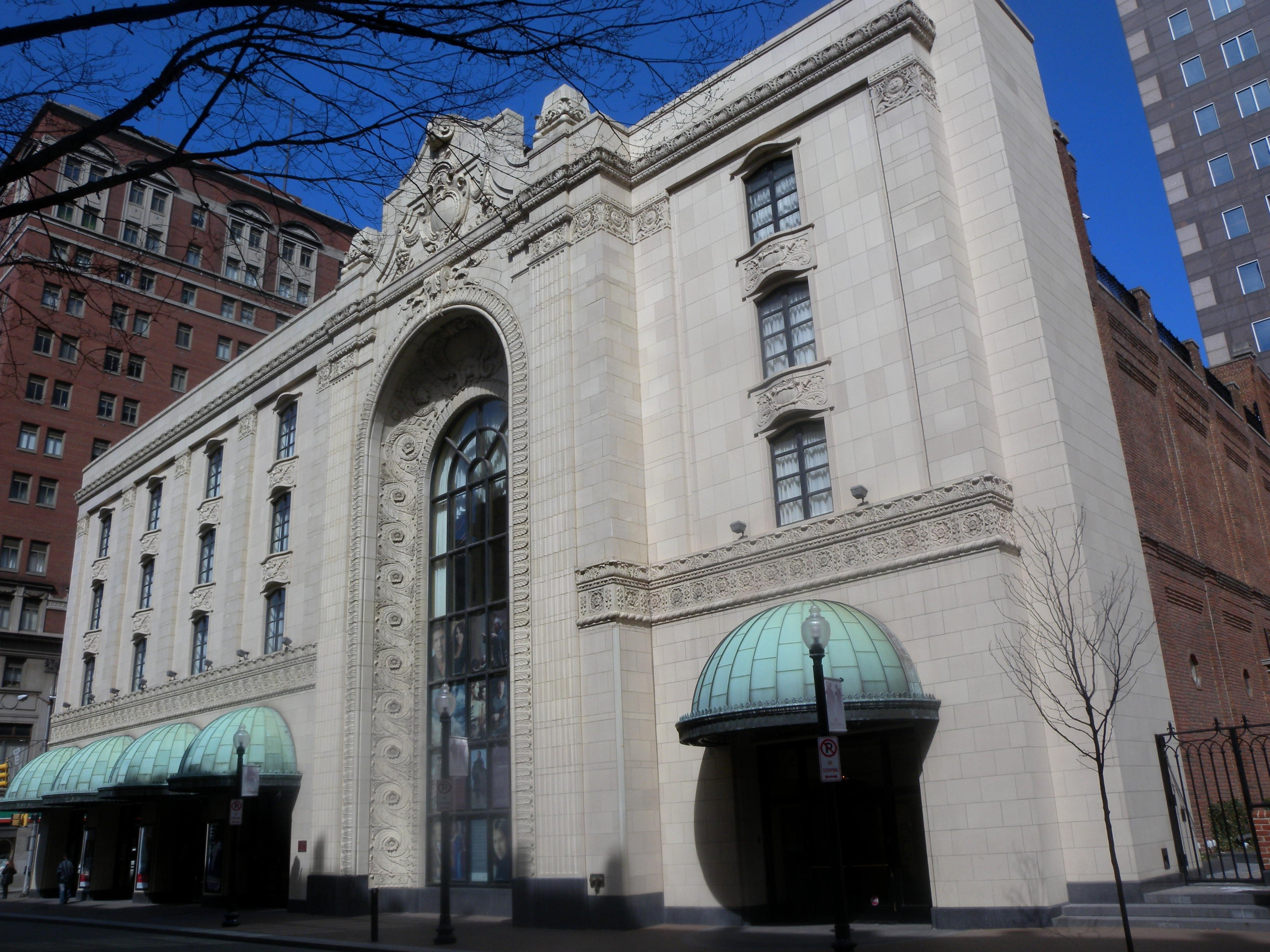
Heinz Hall for the Performing Arts

The heritage of theater in Pittsburgh stretches back to at least 1765, when it was recorded that "balls, plays, concerts, and comedies" were being performed at the British military installation at Fort Pitt. Subsequently, amateur "thespian societies" emerged, including the Thespian Society that was organized by students of the Pittsburgh Academy in 1810, the forerunner of the University of Pittsburgh, in order to stage popular comedies and musical entertainment. These students included Henry Marie Brackenridge, the son of university founder Hugh Henry Brackenridge; Morgan Neville, the son of Presley Neville; and future U.S. Congressman and Senator William Wilkins. This club was frequently mentioned by travelers commenting on the early culture of Pittsburgh, however it was disbanded by university faculty in 1833 because, according to Agnes Starrett's 1937 history of the university, "instead of Shakespeare, the members had begun to produce vulgar modern comedies". Throughout the 1800s, Pittsburgh was home to various stock companies, beginning with the Theater on Third Street, Pittsburgh's first free-standing playhouse, in 1813. These companies were composed of eight to ten local actors, a stage manager and prompter, a stage carpenter, a properties master, and occasionally an orchestra leader; the local actors would perform with touring "stars" such as William Macready, Edwin Forrest, Junius and Edwin Booth, Charles Kean, Charlotte Cushman, James Hackett, and Edwin Adams. An important milestone in the creation of indigenous Pittsburgh theater occurred when William Henderson took over the lease of the Old Drury in 1859 and produced plays by Pittsburgh playwrights in the theater's season. Other theaters followed Henderson's lead, including the Pittsburgh Opera House, which held the first productions of nationally regarded playwright Bartley Campbell.

In the early 1900s, Pittsburgh became a key location for productions handled by the Theatrical Syndicate due to its strategic location, abundance of playhouses, excellent rail service, and established audiences. Sam Nixon and Fred Zimmerman's building of the Nixon and the Gayety (now Byham Theater) attracted touring productions of successful Broadway plays as well as international ballet and opera companies. Harry Davis, another theatrical entrepreneur in the early 1900s, founded the Family Avenue Theater and the Pittsburgh Opera House, which produced melodramas and standard plays as well as showed films. In the early 1910s, concern over the lack of serious or "legitimate" theater in Pittsburgh led to an "art theater movement" that involved the establishment of the Pitt Theatre Company of Pittsburgh in 1913, the Drama League of Pittsburgh in 1912, and 1914, the establishment of the nation's first bachelor of arts degree in theater at Carnegie Tech. In the 1920s, vaudeville became very popular in Pittsburgh, and the Little Theater Movement was represented by many independent, noncommercial theater companies such as People's Playhouse of the North Side, the Suburban Theater of the South Hills, the Tarkington Theater, the Pitt Players, and the Duquesne University Red Masquers. During the Great Depression in the 1930s, noncommercial theater became more culturally important and political in nature, exemplified by the New Theater of Pittsburgh, organized in 1935. Black theater also became a more important cultural force at this time, most notably with the Olympian Players. The Negro Drama League was formed in 1932 to support the vibrant theatrical activity of African-Americans in Pittsburgh. Jewish theatrical activity also became more prominent in Pittsburgh at this time, notably with the Irene Kaufmann Settlement Players. German and Catholic theater developed a presence as well. Civic theaters devoted to a sense of civic theatrical identity grew in popularity; the still-active Pittsburgh Playhouse, established in 1934, is the most enduring theater of this movement.

== Theaters ==
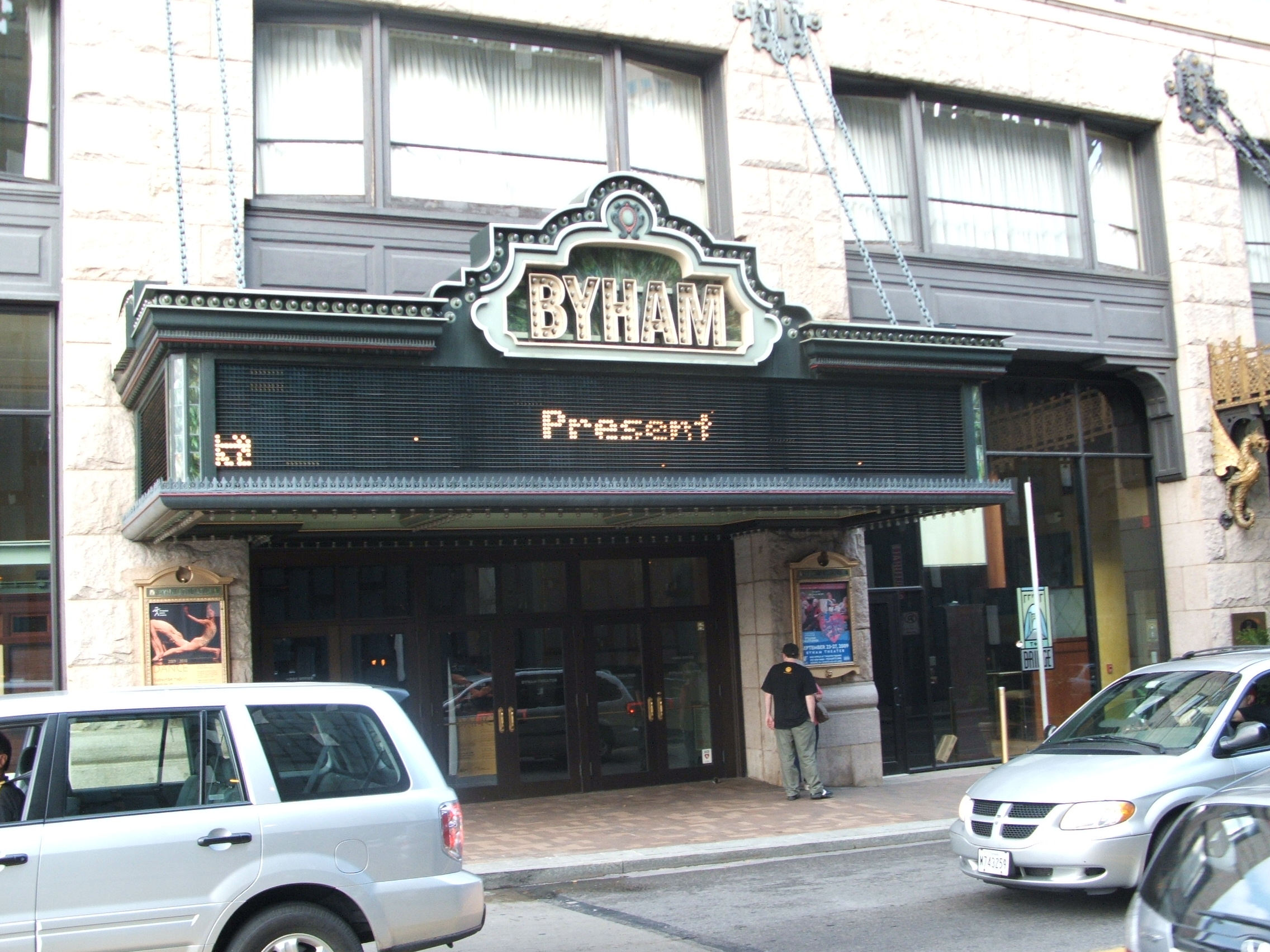
Byham Theater

Of the theater companies in Pittsburgh currently in existence, there are a few with a long history of performances. Pittsburgh Civic Light Opera was one such company; staging primarily musicals, it held its first production in 1946 at the Pitt Stadium. Over the years, the company has moved to various locations throughout the city and currently holds productions in the Benedum Center. The Pittsburgh Savoyards, which specializes in Gilbert and Sullivan (G&S) operettas, came into existence in 1938, and is currently housed in Bellevue and performing in the Andrew Carnegie Free Library & Music Hall. University of Pittsburgh Stages emerged from various performance troupes at the school in the early 20th century to become the formal company of the school's theater arts performance training program of the university in the 1960s. The university company became professionally oriented in 1981, and continues to stage several productions throughout the year in their primary facility, the historic Stephen Foster Memorial. Saint Vincent Summer Theatre, another major fixture of the Pittsburgh area, began in Latrobe in 1969. The theater has staged many different kinds of productions over the years, and now produces mostly light farces for a summer theater audience. Mountain Playhouse, one of the oldest professional theaters in the Pittsburgh area, made its debut in nearby Jennerstown in 1939. Similar to St. Vincent, Mountain Playhouse also stages light summer stock fare, including comedies and musicals. Apple Hill Playhouse in nearby Delmont also stages light comedies and musicals as well as children's theater; it was established in the 1950s. Pittsburgh Playhouse, currently home to Point Park University's conservatory students and resident professional theater company Playhouse Rep, opened its doors in 1934 as a community theater. Stage Right was established in the mid-1960s and continues to produce theater in the Fox Chapel area of Pittsburgh. Other important theater companies of the mid-twentieth century include Black Horizon Theater, an African-American theater troupe that evolved out of a writers' workshop; and peer support group called the Centre Avenue Poets' Theater Workshop; this theater company held some of the first productions of August Wilson's work. Pittsburgh Public Theater was chartered in 1974 by Joan Apt, Margaret Rieck and Ben Shaktman and held its first production in 1975. Staging a wide variety of plays and musicals, from classical to contemporary, the theatre has become a major regional theatre and is currently housed in the O'Reilly Theater. City Theatre also staged its first production in 1975 as the City Players, a group of recent college graduates that gave free performances in schools, parks, and housing projects. The company has since evolved to become a major regional theatre that has staged premieres of new works by Christopher Durang, Adam Rapp, Jeffrey Hatcher, Eric Simonson, and Leslie Ayvazian. In 1980, Attilio Favorini founded the Three Rivers Shakespeare Festival, a professional theatre company in residence at the University of Pittsburgh which produced Shakespeare at the Stephen Foster Memorial and was successful for many years.

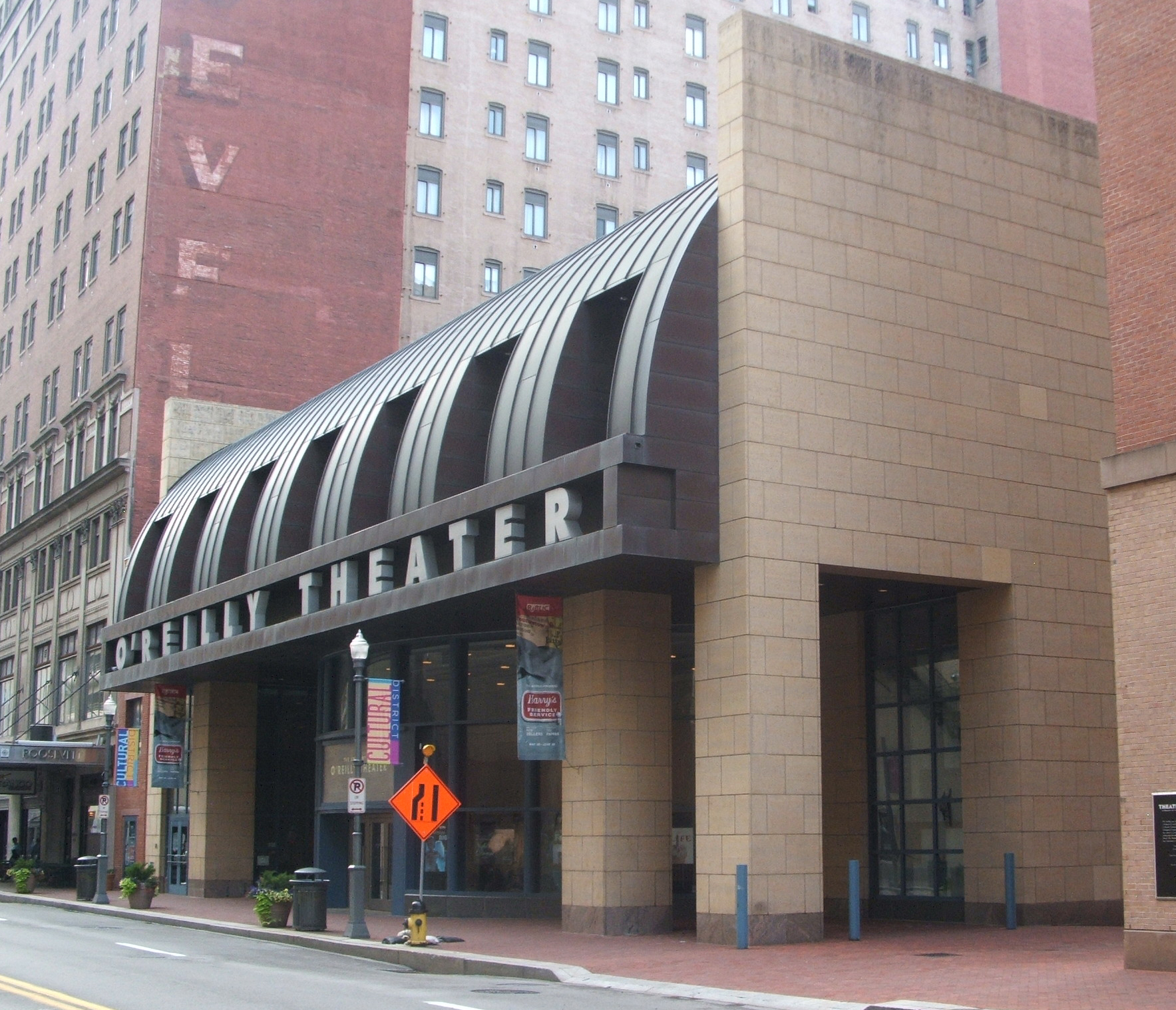
O'Reilly Theater

In the 1990s and early 2000s, a new generation of theatre companies emerged. Quantum Theatre was founded in 1990 by Karla Boos; it has staged productions of plays, musicals, and operas from world culture in nontraditional spaces around the Pittsburgh area. The Pittsburgh New Works Festival was established in 1990 as well to provide a venue for new plays by playwrights from all over the country. Pittsburgh Musical Theater opened in 1990 as another venue for musical theater in the city. The performance art troupe Squonk Opera was formed in Pittsburgh in 1992 and has gone on to perform in venues across the globe in addition to performing in local venues. Unseam'd Shakespeare Company was established in 1993 and has staged classical and classically inspired plays. The Summer Company was also established in 1993 as a venue for summer productions of contemporary and classical plays. Pittsburgh Irish and Classical Theatre was founded in 1996 and has also staged plays from European and classical playwrights. Prime Stage Theatre was also founded in 1996 and is focused on the educational aspect of theatre. In 1999, Stage Right! was formed in Greensburg as another venue for professional musical theatre in the region as well as to train young people in the skills of musical theatre. Jewish Theatre of Pittsburgh was formed in 2001, producing theatre from a Jewish perspective. Cup-A-Jo Productions was founded in 2004 with a mission of combining productions of new and established works with other media such as film, dance, and poetry. Future Ten emerged in 2003 as another venue for new plays, showcasing the ten-minute play format. Hiawatha Project, 12 Peers Theater, Caravan Theatre of Pittsburgh, Throughline Theatre Company, Three Rivers Theatre Company, Organic Theater Pittsburgh, Phase 3 Productions, Theatre Sans Serif, Carrnivale Theatrics, and Bald Theatre Company were all established in the late 2000s and early 2010s and have continued the expansion of Pittsburgh's thriving theatre community.

Modern Companies include Attack Theatre, Bald Theatre Company, barebones productions, Bricolage Production Company, City Theatre, Jewish Theatre of Pittsburgh, Phase 3 Productions, Pittsburgh Irish and Classical Theatre, Pittsburgh Musical Theater, Pittsburgh Playwrights Theatre Company, Pittsburgh Public Theater, Prime Stage Theatre, Pittsburgh Civic Light Opera, Quantum Theatre, Hiawatha Project, Cup-A-Jo Productions, Heritage Players, Organic Theater Pittsburgh, 12 Peers Theater, The Pittsburgh Savoyards, Three Rivers Theatre Company, Throughline Theatre Company, Comtra Theater, No Name Players, Terra Nova Theatre Group, Caravan Theatre of Pittsburgh, Carrnivale Theatrics, Theatre Sans Serif, The Summer Company, Stage Right, Unseam'd Shakespeare Company, Front Porch Theatricals and Saltworks Theatre Company.

== Prominent Pittsburgh theatre professionals ==
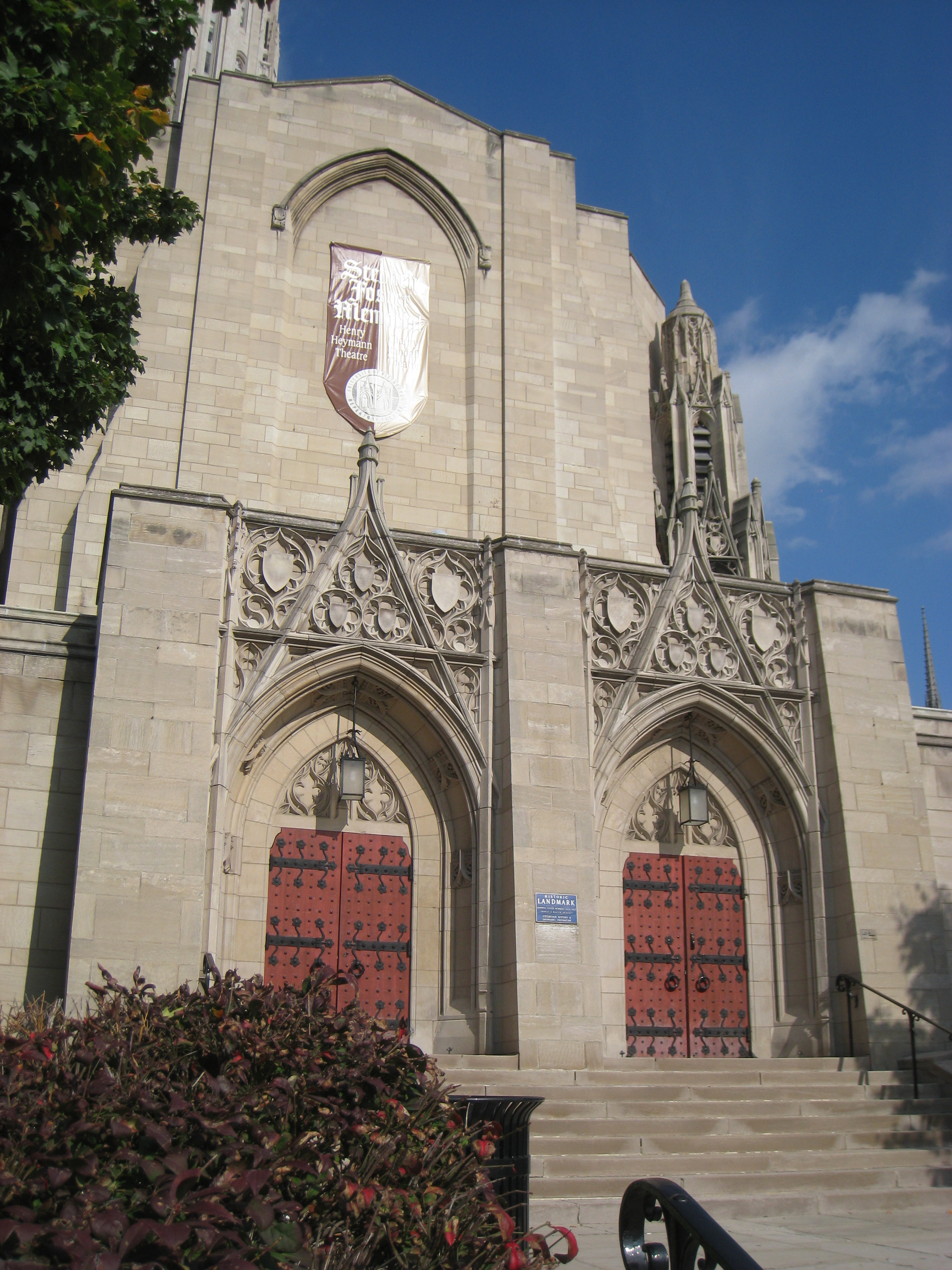
Stephen Foster Memorial

These are theatre professionals who were born in Pittsburgh or have worked and lived there for an extended period of time.

- Rob Ashford – director/choreographer
- Tom Atkins – actor
- Shirley Booth – actress
- Christian Borle – actor
- Bartley Campbell – playwright
- Caitlin Clarke – actress
- Gab Cody – playwright
- Barbara Feldon – actress
- Stephen Flaherty - composer
- Jeff Goldblum – actor
- Frank Gorshin – actor
- Ann Harding – actress
- Jed Allen Harris – director
- Billy Hartung – actor
- Holly Hunter – actress
- Phyllis Hyman – singer/actress
- Gillian Jacobs – actress
- Cherry Jones – actress
- Shirley Jones – actress
- Melina Kanakaredes – actress
- George S. Kaufman – playwright
- Michael Keaton – actor
- Gene Kelly – actor
- Christine Laitta – actress
- Heath Lamberts – actor
- Joe Manganiello – actor
- Kathleen Marshall – director/choreographer
- Rob Marshall – director/choreographer
- Allison McAtee – actress
- Lenora Nemetz – actress
- David Newell – actor
- Stuart Pankin – actor
- Rob Penny – playwright
- George Peppard – actor
- Billy Porter – actor
- Joshua Elijah Reese – actor
- Lillian Russell – actress
- Montae Russell – actor
- Alan Stanford – actor, director, playwright
- Sada Thompson – actress
- Regis Toomey – actor
- Sam Tsoutsouvas – actor
- John Wells – producer, writer, and director
- Clara Whipple – actress
- August Wilson – playwright
- Cory Pattak - Lighting Designer

== See also ==
- Culture of Pittsburgh
- List of Pittsburgh Performing Arts Companies and Venues
