= No Name Players =

No Name Players is a professional theatre company based in Pittsburgh, Pennsylvania. Founded in 2000 by Don DiGiulio at Marshall University in Huntington, West Virginia, the theatre company began as a creative outlet for DiGiulio and his classmates to hone their craft outside of college-related performance opportunities. It has since evolved to become an important part of Pittsburgh's theatre scene, establishing its presence in 2004 with a production of Charles Mee's Big Love, which was recognized as one of the Top Ten Plays of 2004 by the Pittsburgh Post-Gazette. The company's mission is to "present unique and challenging theatrical productions by both new and established playwrights with an emphasis on the collaborative nature of theatre through ensemble." It is notable for its "SWAN Day" celebration, which is an annual theatrical event that features short plays and other performance pieces that are created primarily by women, in connection with the international holiday SWAN (Support Women Artists Now) Day which occurs on the last Saturday of Women's History Month. The company has no performance space of its own but has used performance spaces around Pittsburgh, including Pittsburgh Playwrights Theatre Company, Bricolage Production Company, and the Grey Box Theatre. It has received attention from Pittsburgh Post-Gazette, Pittsburgh Tribune-Review, Out Online, and Pittsburgh City Paper.

On January 30, 2012, No Name Players was one of twelve companies to participate in Organic Theater Pittsburgh's From the Ground Up event to promote collaborations between Pittsburgh playwrights and local theater troupes.

== See also ==
- Theatre in Pittsburgh
