= Stage Right (disambiguation) =

Stage Right is a theatre company in Pittsburgh.

Stage Right may also refer to:

- Stage right, a stage direction
- Stage Right!, a theatre company in Greensburg, Pennsylvania

== See also ==
- Stage Left (disambiguation)
