= Lenora Nemetz =

American theatre actress

Lenora Nemetz is an American stage and musical theatre actress.

== Career ==
Nemetz left her native Pittsburgh as a teenager to work on Broadway. Her Broadway debut was in Cabaret. A protégé of Bob Fosse, Nemetz first came to the attention of New York critics when she understudied and later succeeded Chita Rivera as Velma Kelly in Fosse's production of Chicago. In a 2007 posting on the BroadwayWorld message board, Nemetz recalled how she got to play both Roxie Hart and Velma Kelly on the same day during the original production of Chicago: "I replaced Chita, with Ann Reinking and with Gwenn [sic] (Verdon) ... and I played both roles - I stood by for both Gwenn and Chita, and they were kind enough to let me play both roles in the same day. At the matinee I played Velma Kelly and in the evening performance I played Roxie Hart. It was fun!!"

Nemetz also created the role of Delores Dante in the Broadway production of Working, earning a Drama Desk Award nomination. She appeared with Peter Allen in his one man show Up in One both on Broadway and in Los Angeles. She then co-starred with Chita Rivera as Angel in The Rink filling in for Liza Minnelli. She made her New York City opera debut in the role of Gladys in the revival of The Pajama Game. In 2008, she appeared in The Patti LuPone revival of Gypsy on Broadway, playing Mazeppa and Miss Kratchitt; she was also standby for LuPone as Rose. National tours have included Sweet Charity, Bye Bye Birdie, Cabaret, and Some Like It Hot. Nemetz has remained a prominent actress in Pittsburgh theatre, having appeared over the years in productions at Pittsburgh Civic Light Opera, Pittsburgh Musical Theater, City Theater, and Pittsburgh Public Theater.

== Performances ==
- Murder on the Orient Express (Pittsburgh) 2022 - Helen Hubbard
- Oklahoma (Pittsburgh) 2011 - Aunt Eller
- Nunsense (Pittsburgh) 2010, 2011 - Sister Robert Anne
- Gypsy Broadway (Broadway Revival) 2008 - Mazeppa, Miss Cratchitt, Rose (Standby)
- Café Puttanesca (Regional US) World Premiere, 2003 - The Baroness
- Hello Dolly (Pittsburgh) 2002 - Dolly Levi
- Some Like It Hot (US Tour) First Class National Tour, 2002 - Sweet Sue
- Cabaret (US Tour) National Tour, 1999 - Fraulein Kost (Replacement)
- Bye Bye Birdie (US Tour) Touring Revival, 1991 - Rose Alvarez
- The Pajama Game (Off-Broadway) New York City Opera Revival, 1989 - Gladys
- Show Boat (Milburn, NJ; Regional) Paper Mill Production, 1989 - Ellie
- Anything Goes (Pittsburgh) Pittsburgh Playhouse, 1988
- Sweet Charity (US Tour) National Tour, 1987 - Nickie; Charity (Standby)
- A Chorus Line (Pittsburgh) Pittsburgh Playhouse, 1985- Cassie
- The Rink (Broadway) Original Broadway Production, 1984 - Angel (Standby)
- America Kicks Up Its Heels (Off-Broadway) Original Off-Broadway Production, 1983 - Hennie
- Peter Allen: Up in One Concert (Broadway) 1979 - Performer
- Working (Original Broadway Production) 1978 - Performer: Terry Mason (stewardess), Babe Secoli (supermarket checker), Delores Dante (waitress)
- Spotlight (Broadway) Closed on the road, 1978 - Performer
- Chicago Original Broadway Production, 1975 Roxie Hart (Replacement), Velma Kelly (Replacement), Roxie Hart (Standby)
- Cabaret Original Broadway Production, 1966 - Fritzie (Replacement)
