= Caitlin Clarke =

American actress (1952–2004)

- Clarke in Dragonslayer (1981)
- Born: Katherine Anne Clarke; May 3, 1952; Pittsburgh, Pennsylvania, U.S.
- Died: September 9, 2004 (aged 52); Sewickley, Pennsylvania, U.S.
- Education: Mount Holyoke College (BA); Yale University (MFA)
- Occupation: Actress
- Years active: 1978–2001

Caitlin Clarke (born Katherine Anne Clarke; May 3, 1952 – September 9, 2004) was an American actress best known for her roles as Valerian in the 1981 fantasy film Dragonslayer and Charlotte Cardoza in the 1998–1999 Broadway musical Titanic.

== Early life and education ==
Clarke was born in Pittsburgh, the oldest of five sisters, the youngest of whom is Victoria Clarke. Her family moved to Sewickley when she was ten.

Clarke received her B.A. in theater arts from Mount Holyoke College in 1974 and her M.F.A. from the Yale School of Drama in 1978. During her final year at Yale, Clarke performed with the Yale Repertory Theater in such plays as Tales from the Vienna Woods.

== Career ==
Clarke starred in the 1981 fantasy film Dragonslayer.

After appearing in three Broadway plays in 1985, Clarke moved to Los Angeles for several years as a film and television actress.

In 1986, she appeared in the film Crocodile Dundee as Simone, a friendly prostitute. That same year, Clarke appeared in the television series The Equalizer as Jessie Moore, the mother of Laura, played by nine year-old Melissa Joan Hart, who asks McCall for protection from an abusive ex-husband in "Torn."

She returned to theater in the early 1990s, and to Broadway as Charlotte Cardoza in Titanic.

From 1997 to 2000, Clarke had a reoccurring role on Law & Order as Defense Attorney Linda Walsh.

== Personal life and death ==
Clarke was diagnosed with ovarian cancer in 2000. She returned to Pittsburgh to teach theater at the University of Pittsburgh and at the Pittsburgh Musical Theater's Rauh Conservatory as well as to perform in Pittsburgh theatre until her death on September 9, 2004.

== Stage ==
=== Broadway ===
- 1983 – Teaneck Tanzi: The Venus Flytrap
- 1985 – The Marriage of Figaro
- 1985 – Arms and the Man
- 1985 – Strange Interlude
- 1998 – Titanic: A New Musical

=== Off-Broadway ===
- 1979 – Othello
- 1981 – No End of Blame
- 1983 – Summer
- 1984 – Total Eclipse
- 1984 – Quartermaine's Terms
- 1984 – Thin Ice
- 1994 – Three Birds Alighting On A Field
- 1994 – Unexpected Tenderness

=== Regional ===
- 1978 – Tales from the Vienna Woods (New Haven)
- 1979 – The Winter's Tale (Washington)
- 1980 – Bal (Chicago)
- 1981 – Plenty (Chicago)
- 1982 – Summer Vacation Madness (Minneapolis)
- 1984 – As You Like It (San Diego)
- 1984 – Not Quite Jerusalem (New Haven)
- 1989 – Our Country's Good (Los Angeles)
- 1991 – The Queen And The Rebels (Baltimore)
- 1996 – Mrs. Warren's Profession (New Haven)
- 1997 – Indiscretions (Dallas)
- 1997 – The Glass Menagerie (Portland, Maine)
- 1999 – Griller (Baltimore)
- 2000 – Who's Afraid of Virginia Woolf (Rochester, NY)
- 2002 – The Gigli Concert (Pittsburgh)
- 2002 – Aristocrats (Pittsburgh)

== Filmography ==
=== Film ===
- 1981 Dragonslayer as Valerian
- 1986 Crocodile Dundee as Simone
- 1988 Kenny (The Kid Brother) as Sharon
- 1989 The Big Picture as Sharon
- 1989 Penn & Teller Get Killed as Carlotta / Officer McNamara
- 1994 Blown Away as Officer Rita
- 1997 Cost of Living as Annie
- 1997 A Cure For Serpents (Short) as Mother
- 1999 Joe the King as Pat
- 2001 Never Again as Allison (final film role)

=== Television ===
Caitlin Clarke television credits
Year	Title	Role	Notes
1986	The Equalizer	Jessie Moore	Episode: "Torn"
1987	Moonlighting	Elaine Johnson	2 episodes
1987	Once a Hero	Emma Greely / Emma Greeley	3 episodes
1986	Mayflower Madam	Virginia	TV movie
1990	Matlock	Sandra Townsend	Episode: "The Witness"
1991	Love, Lies and Murder	Sandra Eden	TV movie
1991	Northern Exposure	Irene Rondenet	Episode: "Only You"
1996	The Stepford Husbands	Lisa	TV movie
1997–2000	Law & Order	Defense Attorney Linda Walsh	3 episodes "Menace" (S7.E11) "Juvenile" (S9.E18) "Stiff" (S10.E23)
2000	Sex And The City	Uptight Woman	1 episode
