= Black Horizon Theater =

Theater company

Black Horizons Theater was a community-based, Black Nationalist theater company co-founded in 1968 by Curtiss Porter, Tony Fountain, E. Philip McKain, August Wilson and Rob Penny in the Hill District of Pittsburgh, Pennsylvania, United States.

== History ==
The Black Horizons Theatre began in 1968 with funding from the Program Committee of the Black Action Society, a student-community activist group at the University of Pittsburgh. A committee of students consisting of Curtiss Porter, Program Committee Chair, Tony Fountain, Political Action Committee Chair and E. Philip McKain Community Action Chair met with poets and playwrights Rob Penny and August Wilson at a Community Action Program office, where Penny on Chauncey Street in Pittsburgh's fabled Hill District, where Penny was employed, and laid plans for a community oriented, politically motivated theater along the lines of Barbara Ann Teer's National Black Theatre in Harlem, Amiri Baraka's Spirit House in Newark, and other Black Theatre groups across the country.

In 1967 Penny began to write plays, influenced by the example of the poet and playwright Amiri Baraka, and completed two one-acts. Wilson intended to direct them. He obtained a copy of The Fundamentals of Play Directing by Pittsburgh's directing guru, Carnegie Mellon University's Lawrence Carra, and studied it. In 1968 Penny and Wilson joined the Black Action Society effort to begin the new venture as Black Horizons Theatre. The initial production of the Black Horizons Theatre was Amiri Baraka's "A Black Mass", directed by Curtiss Porter. Black Horizons Theatre's later productions included Rob Penny's early plays flanked by an ensemble format of poets, drummers, dancers and speeches.

As noted in The Pittsburgh Courier, on August 16, 1969 The Black Horizons Theatre performed at the First Annual Homewood Black Arts Festival. Homewood is another of Pittsburgh's historically Black neighborhoods. Homewood, like the Hill District, had been a Mecca for Black talent and the festival featured artists ranging from the Manhattans to Pharoah Sanders, with crowds over 10,000. Black Horizons Theatre produced the play, "Evolution to Revolution," written and directed by Curtiss Porter, with an all University of Pittsburgh student cast.

Over the next four years the company also produced plays by Ed Bullins, Sonia Sanchez, Baraka, and others. Wilson served as the company director and Penny was the playwright-in-residence. Other company members included Maisha Baton, Mary Bradley, Lateef Baba Ali, Marsha Lillie, Carol Wise, Tony Fountain, Curtiss Porter, Ron Pitts, Elva Branson, Frank Floyd Hightower, Claude Purdy, and Sala Udin.

In 1971, under the direction of Elva Branson, Black Horizon Theater mounted the first all-black theater production on the University of Pittsburgh campus, Rob Penny's Center Avenue: A Trip.

Black Horizon Theater dissolved by the mid-1970s. University of Pittsburgh professor Dr. Vernell A. Lillie picked up its legacy, however, when she founded Kuntu Repertory Theatre in 1975 as a way of showcasing the playwright Rob Penny, who continued to write prolifically. The next year August Wilson brought his own early effort in playwrighting, Homecoming, to Kuntu; it was his first play to be produced by a resident company.

Wilson, Penny, and poet Maisha Baton also started the Kuntu Writers Workshop to continue the tradition of Centre Avenue Poets' Theater Workshop.

In the early 1990s, Elva Branson founded the New Horizon Theater as a tribute to Black Horizon Theater and a platform for Pittsburgh's burgeoning community of African-American theater artists. This company showcased the work of a core ogroup of actors including Branson, Jonas Chaney, Milton Thompson, Chrystal Bates, and Anthony Thompson.

== See also ==
Theatre in Pittsburgh
