= Bald Theatre Company =

the BALD theatre company
- Formation: 2010
- Type: Theatre group
- Purpose: Contemporary Musical Theatre
- Location: Pittsburgh, PA
- Artistic director: Justin Zeno
- Notable members: Performers: Natalie Hatcher
- Website: http://www.baldtheatre.org/

Bald Theatre Company is a Pittsburgh-based theatre company. Established in 2010 by Justin Zeno, the theatre company's mission, "is to explore and expose stereotypes, focus on the individual, and to embrace those qualities which make us unique and valuable. the BALD theatre company is a celebration of our differences beyond stigma without fear of substance or content while connecting to our collective human experience."

The company debuted in 2010 with the Pittsburgh premiere of Make Me A Song: The Music of William Finn followed in 2011 by A New Brain. Bald Theatre has received attention for its contribution to the Pittsburgh theatrical community, receiving favorable reviews in Pittsburgh City Paper and Pittsburgh Post-Gazette as well as recognition from the Post-Gazette's "Performer of the Year" article for Natalie Hatcher for her supporting performance as the homeless lady in the company's production of A New Brain. The company has held productions in the Grey Box Theatre in Lawrenceville.

On January 30, 2012, the BALD theatre company was one of twelve companies to participate in Organic Theater Pittsburgh's From the Ground Up event to promote collaborations between Pittsburgh playwrights and local theater troupes. In September 2012, the company presented yet another Pittsburgh Premiere, Miller & Tysen's The Burnt Part Boys.

== See also ==
Theatre in Pittsburgh
