= Stage Left (disambiguation) =

Stage Left is a 2003 album by Martin Barre.

Stage Left may also refer to:

- Stage left, a stage direction
- Stage Left (film), a 2011 documentary
- Stage Left Productions, a Canadian theatre company

== See also ==
- Stage Right (disambiguation)
