= Caravan Theatre of Pittsburgh =

Theatre company in Pittsburgh, Pennsylvania, USA

Caravan Theatre of Pittsburgh is a theatre company located in Pittsburgh, Pennsylvania. Established in 2007 by John Gresh, the company has produced contemporary plays, such as 800 Words: The Transmigration of Philip K. Dick, Savage in Limbo and Risk Everything. The company took a hiatus in 2008 due to the Great Recession but returned in 2012 with a well-received production about the life of Philip K. Dick, featuring Dana Hardy reprising a role she originated when she and playwright Victoria Stewart were both in graduate school. Caravan Theatre of Pittsburgh has held performances in both the Penn Avenue and Liberty Avenue performance spaces of Pittsburgh Playwrights Theatre Company.

== See also ==
- Theatre in Pittsburgh
