= Apple Hill Playhouse =

American theatre company

Apple Hill Playhouse was the name of both a theater company and a theater building, both located in Delmont, Pennsylvania.

The theater was established by Gerta Bendl as a theatre space around 1956 in a pre-Civil War barn that was part of Martz Farm. It grew when Bill Loucks and a group from Pittsburgh Playhouse expanded the building and named it the William Penn Theater. It was renamed Apple Hill Playhouse when a trio of theatre practitioners associated with Mountain Playhouse bought the building in 1964; their first production was a one-woman show starring Totie Fields. In 1982, the theater was bought by Pat Beyer, who served as artistic director for the theater until its closure in 2020.

Apple Hill produced a "summer season" that ran from May to October. During the summer, children's plays were produced under the moniker Johnny Appleseed Children's Theater; many of the plays are staged versions of classic stories such as Snow White, Rumpelstiltskin, Aladdin, Sleeping Beauty, Jack and the Beanstalk and The Emperor's New Clothes. Apple Hill also produced seasons of adult programming, which included contemporary plays such as Mrs. Bob Cratchit's Wild Christmas Binge, Rabbit Hole, and Suite Surrender as well as plays from earlier eras such as Butterflies Are Free and The Prisoner of Second Avenue. The Apple Hill company produced and performed the courtroom drama Nuts in the Westmoreland County Courthouse. Apple Hill has also performed many musicals over the years, including Evita, Sweet Charity, and And the World Goes 'Round.

On July 23, 2020, Apple Hill Playhouse announced that it would close down, in part because of the impact of the coronavirus. The theater company itself will seek a new home. The building was sold in 2021.

== See also ==
- Theatre in Pittsburgh
