= The Kill Point =

- Genre: Crime drama
- Created by: James DeMonaco
- Directed by: Steve Shill
- Starring: Donnie Wahlberg; Michael Hyatt; John Leguizamo; Peter Appel; Dana Ashbrook; Adam Cantor; Geoffrey Cantor; Steve Cirbus; Jeremy Davidson; Christine Evangelista; Jennifer Ferrin; Leo Fitzpatrick; Frank Grillo; Michael Hogan; Wayne Kasserman; Michael McGlone; J. D. Williams
- Composer: Justin Burnett
- Country of origin: United States
- Original language: English
- No. of seasons: 1
- No. of episodes: 8

Production
- Executive producers: Todd Lieberman; David Hoberman; James DeMonaco
- Producers: Steve Shill; Randy Nelson; Todd Harthan
- Production location: Pittsburgh
- Production companies: Lionsgate Television; Mandeville Films

Original release
- Network: Spike TV
- Release: July 22 – August 26, 2007

The Kill Point is an American television series that follows a group of U.S. Marines recently returned from serving in Iraq as they come together to pull off a major bank heist of a Three Rivers Bank branch in Pittsburgh. The series, produced by Mandeville Films and Lionsgate Television, was the first drama for the Spike TV network. The working title for the project was The Kill Pitt.

Most of the filming took place in Market Square in downtown Pittsburgh while most of the sound stage filming took place in a warehouse in Lawrenceville, a section of Pittsburgh.

A first-person shooter game based on the show was made available online from Kuma Reality Games.

== Synopsis ==
Jake "Mr. Wolf" Mendez, an ex-Sergeant in the Marine Corps and his men, all former members of the "10-13", a military platoon that participated in combat operations in Iraq and Afghanistan, enter a bank and rob it. Outside, on their way to the getaway car, they are shot at by vigilante, law enforcement, and private security personnel. Forced to retreat back into the bank when the getaway driver is wounded and their vehicle disabled, they take the bank customers hostage. Hostage negotiator Captain Horst Cali attempts to end the stand off while elements of the "10-13" outside the bank and the father of one of the hostages work to help Mr. Wolf and his team escape.

== Cast ==
=== Main ===
- Donnie Wahlberg as Captain Horst Cali, an experienced police negotiator
- John Leguizamo as Sergeant Jake Mendez / Mr. Wolf, the former leader of a Marine Corps platoon, now leading the platoon members in the robbery
- Michael Hyatt as Lieutenant Connie Reubens, the commander of the SWAT team
- Frank Grillo as Albert Roman / Mr. Pig, a flirtatious member of the platoon and Rabbit's brother
- Jeremy Davidson as Corporal Henry Roman / Mr. Rabbit, a violent and unstable platoon member and Pig's brother
- J.D. Williams as Marshall O'Brien Jr. / Mr. Cat, the combat medic of the platoon
- Leo Fitzpatrick as Michael / Mr. Mouse, a platoon member afflicted with posttraumatic stress disorder, which becomes exacerbated by a gunshot wound he suffers
- Geoffrey Cantor as Abe Sheldon, the manager of Three Rivers Bank
- Christine Evangelista as Ashley Beck, the daughter of business mogul Alan Beck
- Adam Cantor as Rocko, an electrician for Three Rivers Bank and former convict
- Wayne Kasserman as Tonray, the technician of the police negotiation team
- Michael McGlone as Deputy Chief Nolan Abrami, Cali's superior
- Jennifer Ferrin as Chloe, a widowed young woman who develops Stockholm syndrome
- Steve Cirbus as Corporal Deke Quinlan, the platoon's getaway driver who assists the team from the outside after he escapes by himself
- Peter Appel as Teddy Sabian, the widowed father of Robby
- Michael Hogan as Hawk, a member of the SWAT team responsible for breaches
- Dana Ashbrook as Tony, a bank employee having a sexual affair with Renee

=== Recurring ===
- Tobin Bell as Alan Beck, a wealthy real estate mogul and the father of Ashley
- Michael K. Williams as Q, the SWAT team's sniper
- Bingo O'Malley as Bernard, an elderly homosexual bank patron
- Ethan Rosenfeld as Robby Sabian, Teddy's teenage son and computer expert
- Ryan Sands as Leroy Barnes, a defense attorney
- Kate Rogal as Marykim, a friend of Ashley's
- Brandi Engel as Cass Conferth, Ashley's friend
- Karen Baum as Karen, a bank teller
- Stefanie E. Frame as Renee, a bank employee in a sexual relationship with Tony
- Brandon Stacy Williams as Augie, a member of the SWAT breach team and friend of Hawk
- Jeff Hochendoner as Big Stan, a former member of Wolf's platoon
- Joshua Elijah Reese as Derzius, one of the former members of Wolf's platoon
- Nick Koesters as Leon, a former member of Wolf's platoon who lost his arm in combat
- Patrick Jordan as Johnny, Q's spotter

=== Guest ===
- Susan Misner as Lorna Ash, an FBI agent assigned to replace Cali as negotiator
- Patrica Cray as Addie, a teller at Three Rivers Bank
- Karen Carbone as Kerry Southwell, an FBI agent present at the bank during the robbery
- Adam Kroloff as Henry, a bank security guard
- John Hawkinson as Zing, a SWAT breach team member
- Laurel Brooke Johnson as Lucy Cali, Cali's pregnant wife
- Patrick Sebes as Luke Mendez, Wolf's heroin-addicted son

== Episodes ==
No.	Title	Original release date
1	"Who's Afraid of Mr. Wolf, Part 1" "Another Tour"	July 22, 2007
2	"Who's Afraid of Mr. Wolf, Part 2" "Who's Afraid of Mr. Wolf?"	July 22, 2007
3	"No Meringue"	July 29, 2007
4	"Pro Patria"	August 5, 2007
5	"Visiting Hours"	August 12, 2007
6	"The Great Ape Escape"	August 19, 2007
7	"The Devil's Zoo, Part 1" "Rabbit at Unrest"	August 26, 2007
8	"The Devil's Zoo, Part 2" "The Devil's Zoo"	August 26, 2007

== Crew ==
The series was executive produced by James DeMonaco, David Hoberman, Todd Lieberman and Steve Shill. DeMonaco has dealt with hostage situations before in his script for The Negotiator. Directors include cable regular Steve Shill who the network hoped would help to establish their reputation for drama.

== Critical response ==
Critics have characterised the show as familiar but watchable. Comparisons have been drawn to 1970s bank heist movies, Tarantino, The Nine and 24. Comparisons to The Nine have been favourable on the grounds that The Kill Point always has an ending in sight. Mr. Wolf's speeches to the crowd has been called "an Attica moment" and compared to Dog Day Afternoon.

The characters have been described as cliché by reviewers. However, the script has drawn praise for its subtlety and entertainment value. One reviewer felt that the running time allowed the clichéd characters to be developed in more interesting directions.

The casting of the show has drawn particular praise. Reviewers have noted the cast members who have also worked on The Wire including Michael K. Williams, JD Williams, Leo Fitzpatrick and Michael Hyatt. The chemistry of the opposing roles of negotiator and hostage taker also drew praise for John Leguizamo and Donnie Wahlberg as well as a surprising performance by Jeremy Davidson an unknown whose portrayal of a disturbed war veteran was very under-rated. The Pittsburgh Post-Gazette praised local actor Bingo O'Malley.

== Webisodes ==
Five webisodes featuring Steve Cirbus as Deke and Joshua Elijah Reese as Derzius were made available via Spike TV's website. They cover the activities of Deke and Derzius of 10/13 platoon outside the bank as they work to aid Mendez and company. The webisodes were written and directed by Josh Trank.

== Cancellation ==
Despite healthy ratings and attaining the target demographic of male viewers, Spike decided not to renew the series for a second season.

== Home media ==
The series was released on DVD in the United Kingdom in 2008.
