= Squonk Opera =

US performing artist collective

Squonk

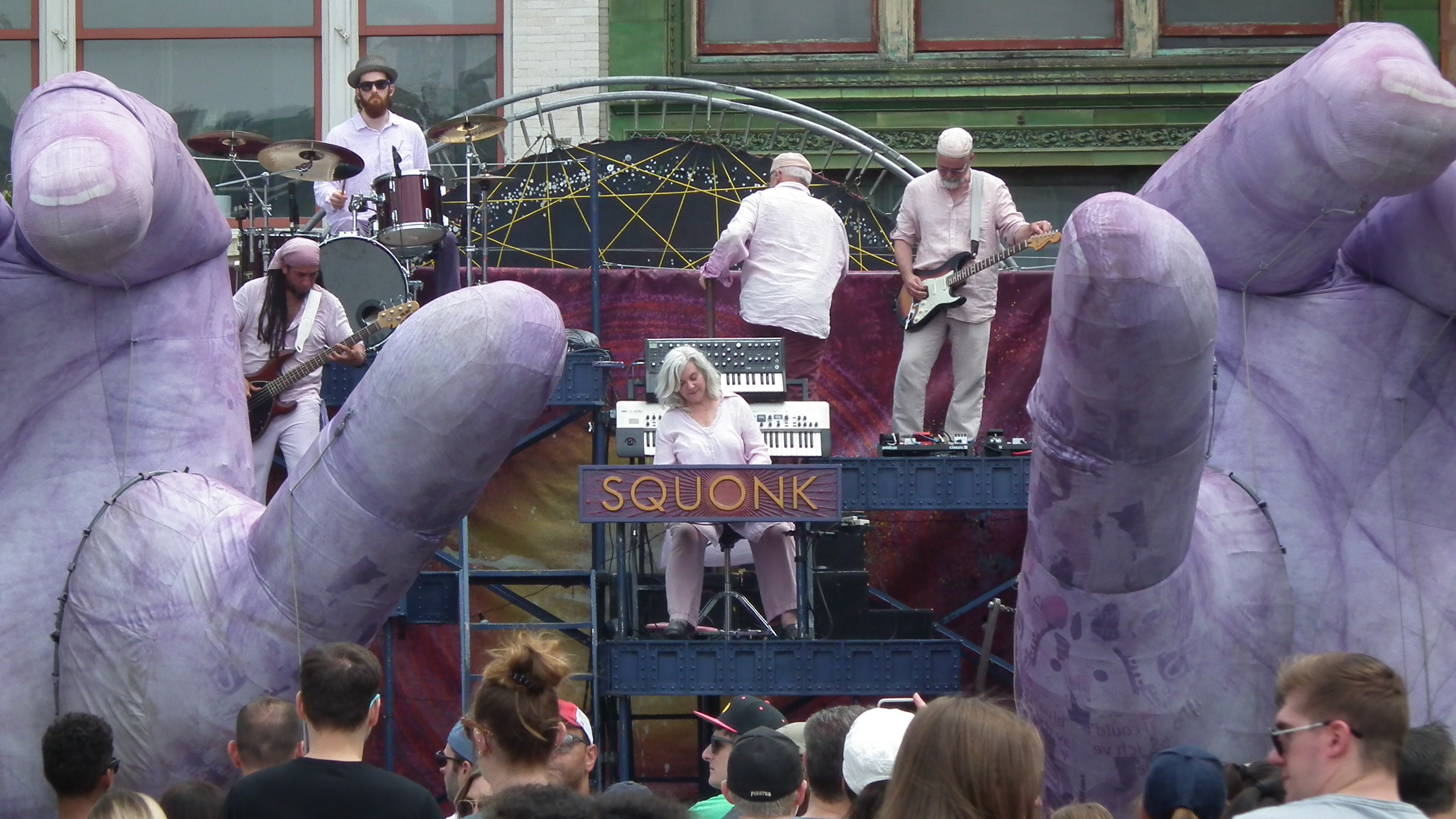
Squonk performs Hand to Hand in 2023 at the Three Rivers Arts Festival

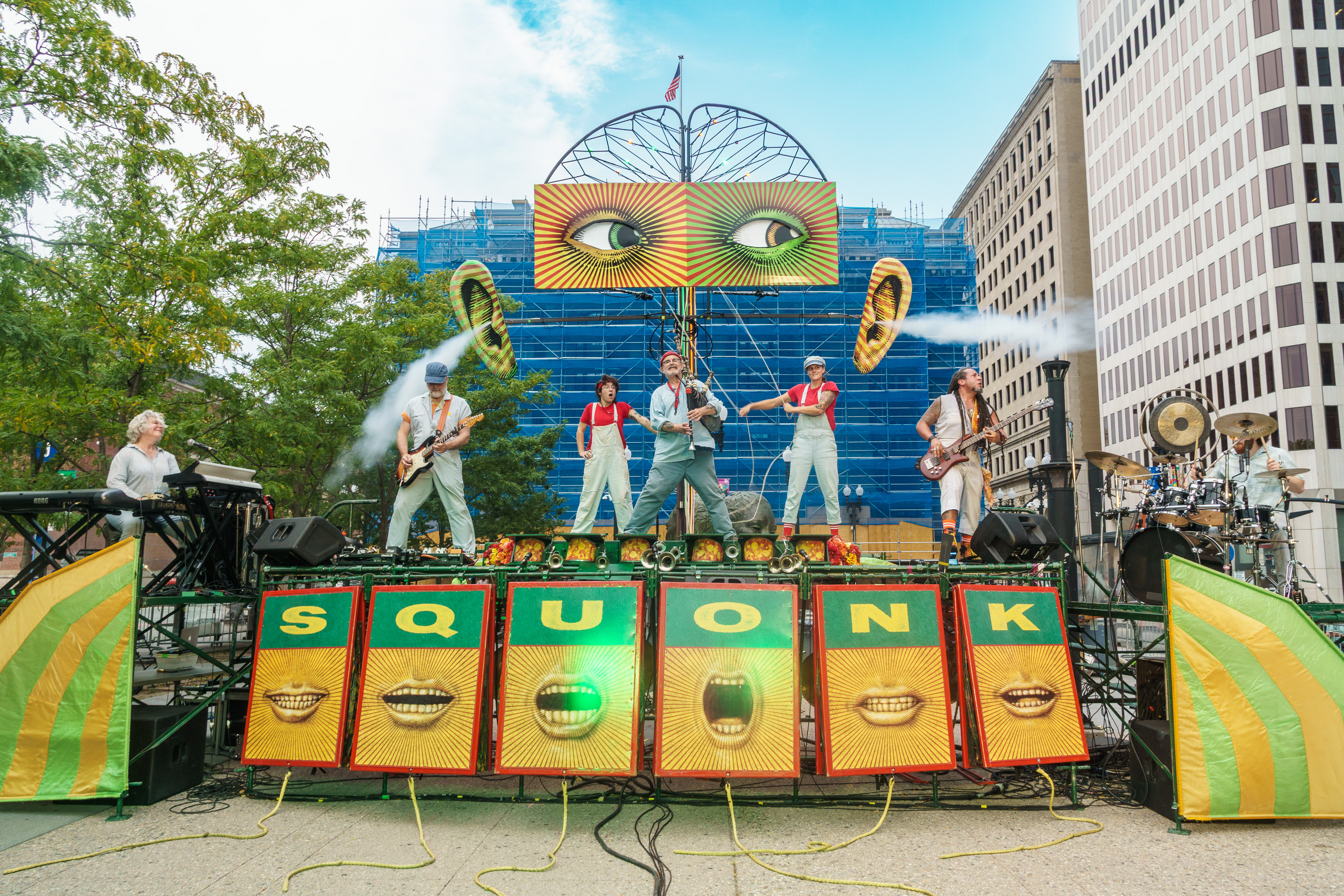
Squonk performs Brouhaha in 2025

Squonk Opera is a group of interdisciplinary performing artists from Pittsburgh, Pennsylvania. Led by artistic directors Jackie Dempsey and Steve O'Hearn, Squonk Opera formed in 1992 and has created fifteen distinct shows and performed in over 250 venues in 36 of the United States. Squonk Opera has been touring internationally since 2003 - to Scotland, Belgium, Germany and twice to South Korea, where they opened both the Busan International Performing Arts Festival and the World Music Theater Festival. In 2017, Squonk was one of the first western acts to perform at the Qingdao International Beer Festival in Qingdao, China. Over 1,000,000 people have seen Squonk around the world, and reviews include “a multimedia troupe of infinite jest with an imagination to match” from The New York Times, "insane majesty" from The Scotsman, and "...surreal and poetic" from USA Today.

Squonk Opera's shows consist of music, visual art, and acting elements in an attempt to make a form of opera accessible to all people. Dempsey says "we like to think of ourselves as a wacky, provincial opera company." They named the group "Squonk" after a description of a jazz saxophonist's playing as a "squonk-fest", rather than the legendary creature of the same name.

In 2000, Squonk Opera took their show Bigsmörgåsbørdwünderwerk onto Broadway from its previous off-Broadway run. Though the venture wasn't a commercial success, the exposure it gained them was ultimately beneficial.

In 2011, Squonk Opera performed on the popular television show America's Got Talent. They were sent directly past the Vegas round into Hollywood, and thus did not compete until the first quarterfinals. The group was eliminated, being buzzed by Sharon Osbourne and Piers Morgan.

Squonk Opera has received over 100 grants and awards for their work, including eight NEA awards, an American Theater Wing Award, and grants from other national funders such as the Rockefeller M.A.P. Fund, Bloomberg Philanthropies, Jim Henson Foundation, and Doris Duke Charitable Foundation. Additionally, Squonk Opera has been supported by numerous local and regional funders, including Heinz Endowments, The Pittsburgh Foundation, PNC Charitable Trust, Grable Foundation, Buhl Foundation, The Opportunity Fund, and many others.

== Shows ==
- Forgotten Works (1995)
  A work focusing on "consumption, waste, and recycling", in collaboration with modern dance troupe No Language. Forgotten Works was performed at Keystone Iron & Metal, a Pittsburgh scrapyard; the artists used such unlikely materials as cranes, demolished cars, and metal shearers as part of the performance.
- Night of the Living Dead: The Opera (1995)
  Squonk Opera was commissioned to set music and live-action performance to the classic Night of the Living Dead zombie film for City Theatre.
- Firedogs (1996)
  A humorous educational multimedia picture of the Pittsburgh steel industry, including such characters as "Bessie the Bessemer Furnace".
- The Great Circle Route (1998)
  Subtitled "The Underwater Opera", The Great Circle Route claims inspiration from medical textbooks, Godzilla movies, and Michel Foucault in a show that draws on imagery of the underwater world for a journey under the sea.
- Bigsmörgåsbørdwünderwerk (1998)
  A surreal tour through the "restaurant kitchen of the mind", in a mix of horror and fantasy.
- Inferno (2001)
  A tale of a mine fire in Centralia, Pennsylvania, based on Dante's Divine Comedy. Initially titled Burn during some early performances.
- Rodeo Smackdown (2004)
  Squonk chooses the unlikely setting of the rodeo for this retelling of the minotaur myth.
- Put your hometown's name here: The Opera (2006)
  Music meets multi-media odes to the history and ambiance of various cities, including Pittsburgh, Baltimore, Albany, St. Louis and Bloomington, In. with local talent, video-taped and projected interviews, and a host of local references tailored to each venue's locale.

Places 'Squonked' include: Albany, NY; Baltimore, MD; Bloomington, IN; Bradford, PA; Central College(Pella, IA); Charleston, WV; Charlotte, NC; Chester County, PA; College Park, MD; Columbia, MD; Edwardsville, IL; Hardin County, KY; Houghton, MI; Indiana County, PA; Jersey Shore(Manasquan, NJ); Newark, DE; Pittsburgh, PA; Raritan Valley, NJ; Reston, VA; South Orange/Maplewood, NJ; St. Louis, MO;

- Astro-rama (2008)
  Squonk sends a message to the cosmos from a 40' radio telescope dish mounted to scaffold towers, and tuned to the galactic frequency of B-flat. Rising in scissor lift platforms and cherry pickers, they compose a proud message from our species, power up and transmit.
- Mayhem & Majesty (2010)
  The sonic hooligans of Squonk Opera explore the beauty of sound, with live feed cameras, projection puppets and kinetic machines, turning the full, fancy-dress concert setting into a playground of ideas.
- GO Roadshow (2012)
  GO Roadshow is “a musical street spectacle on wheels”. This show-making machine is a 34-foot long monster truck retrofitted with truck-horn calliope, a wall made of rotors and a spinning grand piano that is played while it wheels around!
- Pneumatica (2014)
  Pneumatica is an event about air, made by air and powered by air. The Squonkers pump up the volume with live original music that permeates the air, while inflatables pump up and immerse the audience.
- Cycle Sonic (2016)
  Cycle Sonic is a celebration of bicycles and sustainable power with a pageant of double-decker human-powered stages, propelled by our original chamber rock music...and our own legs!
- Hand to Hand (2019)
  The world's largest puppet hands power the human sized challenges of scale and agency to the strains of Squonk's original progressive rock in a rollicking and festive melee.
- Brouhaha (2023)
  Brouhaha is an immersive outdoor spectacle bursting with rollicking music, dazzling imagery, and the thrill of audience participation featuring the Squonkcordion, an enormous musical instrument powered by behemoth bellows topped with towering tuba bells.

== CDs ==
- howandever (1994)
- Ha Ha Tali (1996)
- Bigsmörgåsbørdwünderwerk (2000)
- Inferno (2002)
- Rodeo Smackdown (2004)
- You Are Here (2006)
- Mayhem and Majesty (2010)
- GO (2012)
- Pneumatica (2014)
- Hand to Hand (2021)

== DVDs ==
- Astro-rama (2008)
- Cycle Sonic (2016)

== See also ==
- Theatre in Pittsburgh
