= Quantum Theatre =

Contemporary theatre incubator

- Quantum Theatre logo
- Established: 1990; 36 years ago
- Founder: Karla Boos
- Type: Nonprofit
- Tax ID no.: 25-1760895
- Purpose: Human relationships in unexpected ways.
- Headquarters: 5907 Penn Ave Suite 210; Pittsburgh, Pennsylvania
- Coordinates: 40.462270°N 79.926400°W
- Artistic Director: Karla Boos
- Co-Interim-Executive Director: Julie Deseyn
- Co-Interim-Executive Director: Wanda Wilson
- Budget: $1,500,000 (2021)
- Website: quantumtheatre.com

Quantum Theatre is an experimental theatre company that uses non-traditional stages in Pittsburgh, PA. Founded in 1990 by Karla Boos, it is the longest running producer of site specific plays.

The theatre has been mentioned in American Theatre Magazine and Stage Directions Magazine. It has staged classical plays, adaptations of literature, world premieres and contemporary plays in places such as Washington's Landing, Iron City Brewery, the former Don Allen Auto City, a Downtown loft in the Cultural District, abandoned school houses and the Frick Art & Historical Center.

== Education ==
Quantum Theatre also features an educational outreach program in which a teaching artist helps students at inner-city high schools interpret a play, a piece of literature, or a historical event in contemporary terms. The students then create a performance to be showcased at a rehearsal for a Quantum Theatre production.

On January 30, 2012, Quantum Theatre was one of twelve companies to participate in Organic Theater Pittsburgh's From the Ground Up event to promote collaborations between Pittsburgh playwrights and local theater troupes.

== Productions ==
Quantum Theatre creates site-specific performances tailoring each one to the location. Updates can include costumes, plot, or a completely new adaptation. One example is when performing King Lear at the Carrie Furnace, Karla Boos mixed medieval English clothing with 1970s steelworker uniforms and added union songs to the play.

Season	Location	Play	Author	Notes
2025-2026	Carrie Furnace	The Tempest	William Shakespeare	Directed by founder Karla Boos, in her final production before retiring.
2022-2023	OneValley Roundhouse	The Cherry Orchard	Libby Appel	Directed by Katie Brooks. An elaborate multi-tiered stage was incorporated into the Roundhouse.
2021-2022	Schenley Park Ice Skating Rink	An Odyssey	Jed Allen Harris	Adapted by Jay Ball. Odysseus recounts his tales to a young princess Nausicaa. Quantum Theatre transformed the Ice Rink into a Greek amphitheatre.
2021-2022	The Maverick	Chimerica	Lucy Kirkwood	
2020-2021	Digital Season	Love and Information	Caryl Churchill	
2020-2021	Digital Season	Constellations	Nick Payne	
2020-2021	Digital Season	Wild	Mike Bartlett	
2020-2021	Digital Season	Far Away	Caryl Churchill	
2018-2019	Trinity Cathedral Pittsburgh	Chatterton	Karla Boos	Based on the book by Peter Ackroyd
2018-2019	Carnegie Library of Pittsburgh – Homewood	The Gun Show (Can We Talk about This?)	E. M. Lewis	Additional showings were at West Hall at CCAC – Allegheny Campus & The Tull Family Theater.
2018-2019	Carrie Furnace	King Lear	William Shakespeare	Costumes were a mixture of Early english garments and steelworker gear.
2016-2017	Mellon Park Rose Garden	Peribañez	Lope de Vega	

Quantum Theatre's final production of their 2018-2019 season will be the world premiere of Inside Passage, opening in March 2018. The play was written by Pittsburgh's Gab Cody, whose work was most recently featured in Bricolage Production Company's Dodo: The Time Has Come in partnership with the Carnegie Museums of Pittsburgh. Directed by Sam Turich, Inside Passage incorporates documentary film footage and live performance to explore themes of family, home, childhood, and loss.

== See also ==
- Theatre in Pittsburgh
