= Prime Stage Theatre =

Prime Stage Theatre is a professional theatre company located in Pittsburgh, Pennsylvania, USA. Founded in 1996 by artistic director Wayne Brinda, the company has produced over 65 productions including 9 world and regional premieres and three scripts that are published and produced around the country. The theatre's first production was "A Woman Called Truth" staged at the Station Square Playhouse. The theatre then moved to La Roche College, where it produced two full seasons. In 1998, the theatre moved to Pittsburgh Civic Light Opera Academy for one season, followed by its production of Clemente: The Measure of a Man at Point Park University's George White Theatre in 1999. In 2000, Prime Stage produced works at the New Hazlett Theatre, until it inaugurated a new theatre facility at 937 Liberty Avenue in 2003, a space now inhabited by Bricolage Production Company and Pittsburgh Playwrights Theatre Company. In 2006, Prime Stage returned to the New Hazlett, where it has continued to produce theatrical adaptations of literary classics and classic plays. Prime Stage has also staged productions as part of the Pittsburgh New Works Festival.

Prime Stage has several outreach programs for teens, including its touring Teen Dating Awareness Program, its Theatre Mentor/Internship Program, which provides opportunities for high school and college students to participate in creating theatre productions, and the Teen Advisory Board, which helps guide Prime Stage in the development of its productions as well as participating in service projects that benefit the area's youth.

== See also ==
- Theatre in Pittsburgh
