= Attack Theatre =

American contemporary dance company

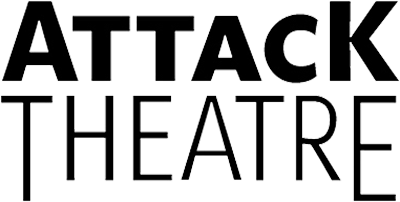
- Attack Theatre logo

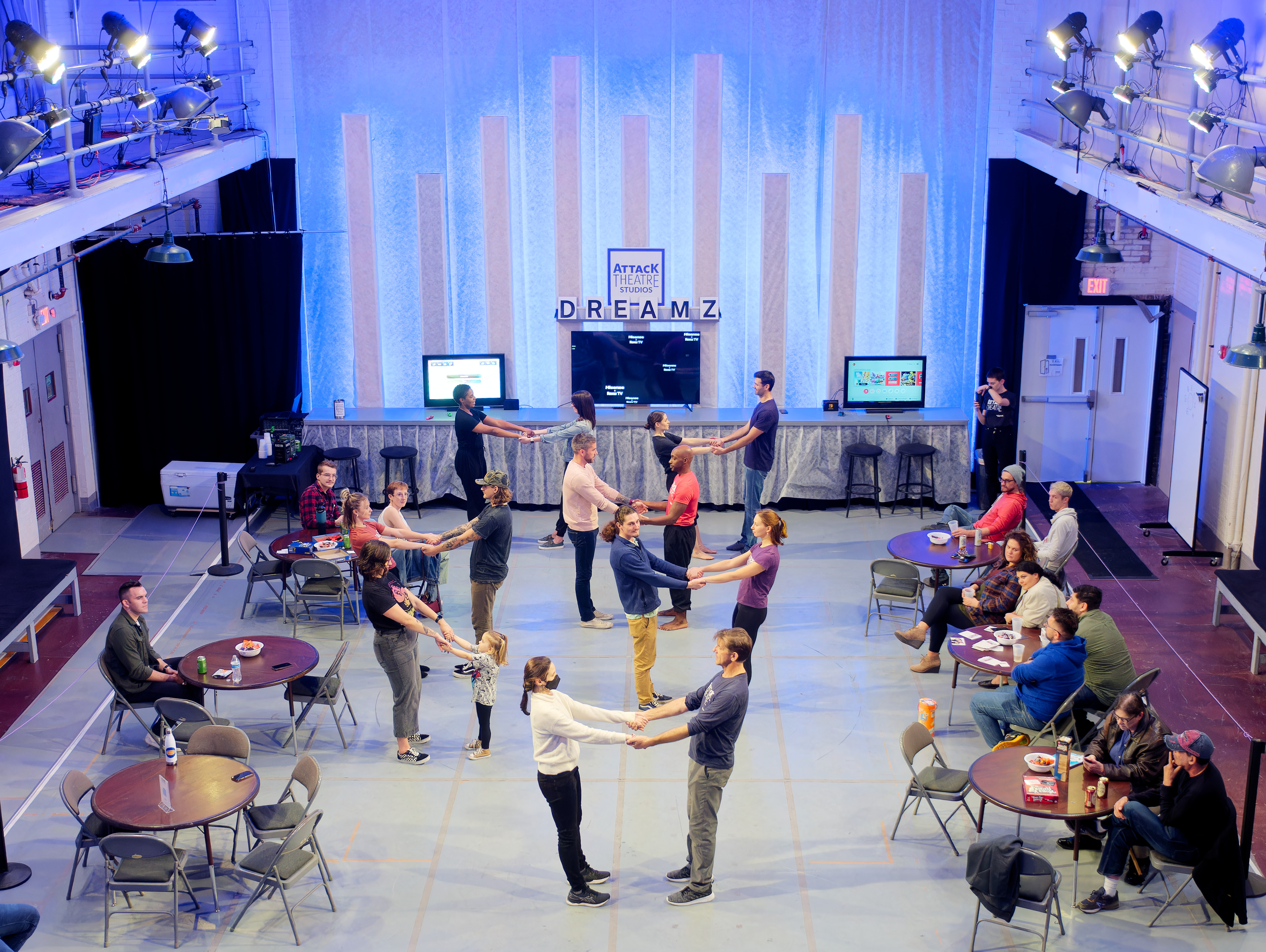
- Attack Theatre's Studio
- Established: 1993; 33 years ago
- Founder: Michele de la Reza, Peter Kope
- Type: Nonprofit
- Tax ID no.: 20-1909284
- Purpose: Artful expression of life through dance.
- Headquarters: 212 45th Street; Pittsburgh, Pennsylvania
- Coordinates: 40.471680°N 79.959110°W
- Budget: $1,000,000 (2021)
- Staff: 15
- Website: attacktheatre.com

Attack Theatre is an American contemporary dance company based in Pittsburgh, PA. Established in 1994 by Michele de la Reza and Peter Kope, the company is best known for its use of non-traditional stages and audience immersion. They have produced over 200 shows and toured internationally.

== About ==
Attack Theatre was founded in 1994 by dancers Michele de la Reza and Peter Kope. The dance company would fuse contemporary dance, modern dance, and incorporate live music into their performances. Dave Eggar would become a long-term collaborator occasionally serving music director and musician for the company. Since its founding, the group has performed over 200 shows. In 2006, the US Embassy sponsored Attack Theatre's international tour. They were the first American dance company to perform in parts of Indonesia in twenty-five years.

During the COVID-19 pandemic, the dance company shifted to open air performances in public parks. The troupe dedicated dancers for performances to be live-stream performers along the ensemble on stage. This hybrid performance earned them recognition and funding from the National Endowment for the Arts.

Throughout the years, Attack Theatre collaborated with Quantum Theatre, Pittsburgh Ballet, and the Pittsburgh Opera. They operated out of Pittsburgh Opera's building while they searched for their own permanent facility. In 2021 they move into their own theatre in Lawrenceville.

== The Dirty Ball ==
In 2006, the organization started the Dirty Ball gala. The dance troupe's fundraiser was located in abandoned warehouses left over Pittsburgh's Steel crisis. Immediately, critics celebrated the gritty urban decay backdrops to the over the top modern dance party. By its tenth anniversary, the Dirty Ball was highly regarded as Pittsburgh's best annual party with thousands in attendance.

Attack Theatre announced a hiatus from producing the Dirty Ball in 2016. Instead they hosted a series smaller fundraisers including 'One Night Stand'. In 2019 Attack Theatre announced the return of the annual fundraiser but has been postponed due to the COVID-19 pandemic.
