= Carrnivale Theatrics =

US theatre company

Carrnivale Theatrics is a Pittsburgh-based theatre company that has produced contemporary musicals. Established in 2009 by Maggie Carr, Justin Fortunato, and Bob Neumeyer, the company was initially founded as a means to utilize the talents of local college students and raise money for breast cancer research. The company has continued to produce musicals such as Sweeney Todd, Ragtime, and Into the Woods. All of Carrnivale Theatrics' productions have been staged at the New Hazlett Theater in the North Side of Pittsburgh.

== See also ==
Theatre in Pittsburgh
