= Throughline Theatre Company =

Theater company based in Pittsburgh

Throughline Theatre Company is a Pittsburgh-based theatre company. Established in 2009 by recent college graduates from Catawba College, the company's mission is to "focus on the past, its impact on the present, and what it holds for the future." The company produces classical plays, contemporary plays, and new works, with each season centered on a theme; each season includes four plays. Throughline Theatre has held productions at the Seton Center in Brookline as well as the Grey Box Theatre in Lawrenceville.

== See also ==
Theatre in Pittsburgh
