= Pittsburgh New Works Festival =

Pittsburgh New Works Festival is an annual festival where participating Pittsburgh-area theatre companies each produce an original one-act play. Established in 1990 by Donna Rae, the Festival features four weeks of productions of new plays as well as two weeks of LabWorks (formerly staged readings). The Festival has taken place in numerous locations, originally having performances at City Theatre's Lester Hamburg Studio, Open Stage, the Father Ryan Arts Center in McKees Rocks, and currently Carnegie Stage in Carnegie.

Each one-act is produced by a different Pittsburgh theatre company; participating theatre companies have included Phase 3 Productions, Prime Stage Theatre, 12 Peers Theater, Cup-A-Jo Productions, Unseam'd Shakespeare Company, The Summer Company, Pittsburgh Playhouse, Stage Right, Red Masquers, and Kuntu Repertory Theatre. Each year the Donna Awards (named after Donna Rae) are given out to actors, directors, and playwrights whose work has been judged the best of the festival. The Festival has provided encouragement and valuable experience to many writers, including F.J. Hartland and Scott Sickles.

== See also ==
- Theatre in Pittsburgh
