= Theatre Sans Serif =

Theatre Sans Serif is a theatre company located in Pittsburgh, Pennsylvania. Founded by Andrew Huntley in 2009, the theatre company's mission is to "produce classical and new works, in innovative and widely ranging styles" and to "foster collaboration between arts organizations." The company has produced a wide variety of events in different locations, including a reading of Charles Dickens's A Christmas Carol at the Calvary Methodist Church in Allegheny, readings of diaries and letters of World War II soldiers at the Soldiers and Sailors National Military Museum and Memorial in Oakland, a 24-hour theatre event presented as part of Pittsburgh's First Night events at the Trust Arts Education Center in downtown Pittsburgh, and an exhibition featuring sculptures inspired by children's war toys at the Spinning Plates Gallery.

== See also ==
Theatre in Pittsburgh
