= Phase 3 Productions =

Phase 3 Productions is a Pittsburgh-based theatre company. Established in 2008, the theatre's mission is to include "relevant social awareness in everything produced." The company has produced theatrical classics like August Strindberg's Miss Julie, as well as contemporary plays like Aaron Carter's Swamp Baby, Bernard-Marie Koltès's Roberto Zucco, and musicals like Godspell. Phase 3 has also held productions in a variety of spaces, such as the Brew House on the South Side and South Park Theatre in South Park Township. The company has also produced original one-act plays in conjunction with the Pittsburgh New Works Festival.

== See also ==
- Theatre in Pittsburgh
