= Lovelace Theatre =

Former puppet theater in Pittsburgh, PA

Coordinates: 40.45777°N 79.92776°W

The Lovelace Theatre was a puppet theater in Pittsburgh, Pennsylvania.

== History ==
The Lovelace Marionette Theatre was the first professional puppet company in the United States to stage performances on a regular schedule for audiences that assembled in a permanent theatrical venue dedicated to that purpose. Beginning in 1964 and running through 1978 Margo Lovelace Visser moved her traveling puppet company from an unheated warehouse in the neighborhood of East Liberty into a garage at 5888-1/2 Ellsworth Ave. in Shadyside, and converted it into a 100-seat intimate theater space. This was the realization of her lifelong dream of owning and operating a professional puppet theater.

Since the early 1950s the Lovelace Marionettes had strictly been a traveling troupe, performing in malls, department stores, schools and arts festivals in Western Pennsylvania, Ohio and West Virginia. The company was based out of Ms. Lovelace's basement and later the East Liberty warehouse in the neighborhood of East Liberty.

The new Lovelace Theatre catered primarily to birthday parties for children ages 4 to 12. Ms. Lovelace, some of her adult children and a curious band of volunteers that she had trained, staged marionette plays from a repertoire of folk and fairy tales, fables and adaptations of various popular children's films.

As the theater built an audience and gained a reputation they began to experiment with comedy and tragedy geared for adults, with plays by Jean Giraudoux, Molière, Jean Cocteau and Robert Pinget, using a wide variety of puppetry styles. The children's shows continued on weekend afternoons, and the adult programs played in the evening. The company continued to book touring shows, in particular several tours of elementary schools in the Pittsburgh Public School system.

In 1977, when they outgrew the little theater on Ellsworth Avenue, the Lovelace Theatre took up residence for their final five seasons at the Carnegie Museum of Art, performing on Saturdays and Sundays in the 200-seat film auditorium in the lower level of the Scaife Gallery.

Margo Lovelace studied at Carnegie Tech (now Carnegie Mellon University) and began her pursuit of puppetry as an apprentice to Cedric Head and his Kingsland Marionettes in the 1940s.

The Puppet Proposition, a 28-minute 16 mm film produced by Margo Lovelace and directed by her son David Visser won a CINE Golden Eagle Award in 1976. Another Lovelace short film, Museum Piece, was nominated for a 1975 "short subject" Academy Award by the Academy of Motion Picture Arts and Sciences.

Upon her retirement in 1984, Margo Lovelace donated her entire collection of puppets and masks to the Children's Museum of Pittsburgh.

In June 2012 Pittsburgh City Councilman William Peduto introduced a resolution (which was unanimously approved by Council) declaring July 24 to be "Margo Lovelace Day," to honor her "undiminished service to the Pittsburgh community," her "inspirational influence on youngsters, students, educators and audiences of many varieties," and her "numerous and diverse artistic accomplishments."
