= Cup-A-Jo Productions =

Theatre company in Pittsburgh, Pennsylvania, USA

Cup-A-Jo Productions is a theatre company located in Pittsburgh, Pennsylvania. Established in 2004 by Joanna Lowe, the company's mission is to "further new & established works in an effort to focus on the artist by tackling a variety of subjects, exploring non-traditional venues & styles, & mixing theatre with film, dance, music & poetry." The company has produced established contemporary and classic plays, such as Medea, No Exit, A Thurber Carnival, and Hospitality Suite, as well as original works such as Life and Other One-Man Shows. Cup-A-Jo Productions has also produced original one-act plays in conjunction with the Pittsburgh New Works Festival. The company has held productions in numerous venues throughout the Pittsburgh area, including Pittsburgh Playwrights Theatre Company, Garfield Artworks, and the University of Pittsburgh Studio Theatre.

== See also ==
Theatre in Pittsburgh
