= Saint Vincent Summer Theatre =

Saint Vincent Summer Theatre is a professional theatre company that is associated with Saint Vincent College in Latrobe, Pennsylvania. Founded in 1969 by Father Tom Devereux, O.S.B., the company was originally composed entirely of St. Vincent students putting together a six-show season. The company grew in popularity over the years and eventually joined Actors' Equity Association in 1985. Joe Reilly was the artistic director of the theatre for many years, and after his death in 2009, his daughter Colleen Reilly succeeded him as Artistic Director. Father Bonaventure Curtis, O.S.B., has served as Executive Director and Executive Producer of the Theatre since 2009. Since 2014, the Artistic Director is Gregg Brandt. The company has employed many prominent actors from the nearby Pittsburgh theatre scene, as well as professional actors from New York City. Among prominent actors, television and film actor Stuart Pankin has acted in many productions with the company.

== See also ==
Theatre in Pittsburgh
