= Red Masquers =

The Duquesne University Red Masquers is the oldest amateur theatre company in the city of Pittsburgh. Known as the Red Masquers since 1914, the company's roots trace back to the late 19th century when Duquesne first started to offer courses in drama. The name Red Masquers refers to Masques, a form of European court entertainment in the 17th century, and the "red" represents Duquesne's colors. Red Masquers Website

== Membership ==
The group comprises a mixture of Duquesne students from all majors. They allow opportunities in acting, along side technical departments such as Set, Lights, Sound, Costuming, Props, and more. Membership is open to all students in good academic standing.

The organization has an entirely student elect executive board. They, alongside staff executive director, producer, and technical director manage the organization day to day.

== Performances ==
The Masquers put on a variety of plays throughout the year, annually performing three to four main-stage plays, generally consisting of one classical, one modern, one contemporary, and a musical. One of these main stage plays is an alumni show in which former members of the Red Masquers are invited to participate. Additionally, they perform "Premieres," which are student-written and student-directed plays, and “Play In A Day” festivals where students fully produce small plays in only 24 hours. The group has also participated in the Pittsburgh Monologue Project.

The Red Masquers celebrated their 100th Season during the 2012-13 School Year. To commemorate this, all of their performances that year were world premieres.

Though the Red Masquers have had many homes over the years, they currently perform in a new black box theater built in 2015, called the Genesius Theater. Additionally, they assist in productions hosted by other companies like Summer Company and The Pittsburgh New Works Festival in the theater. .

== Awards ==
The Red Masquers won the "Outstanding Production" Award for "Moon Over Gomorrah" for the 2013 Pittsburgh New Works Festival.

== See also ==
- Theatre in Pittsburgh
