= Gab Cody =

American dramatist

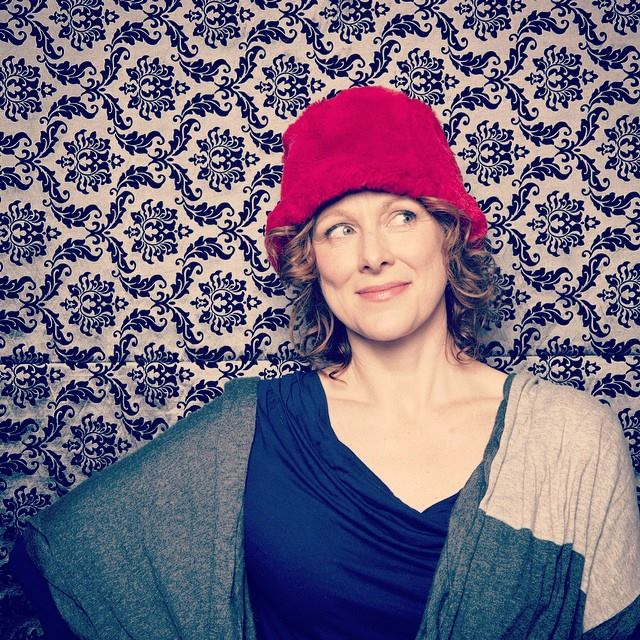
- Born: Gab Cody; Juneau, Alaska
- Education: University of North Carolina School of the Arts (BFA); Point Park University (MFA)
- Occupation: Filmmaker
- Years active: 2004–present
- Spouse: Sam Turich

Gab Cody is an American filmmaker and theatre artist. She wrote, produced and directed the feature film Progression, and her plays Fat Beckett, Crush the Infamous Thing, The Alchemists' Lab, Prussia:1866 and Inside Passage have premiered at theaters. She served as Lead Writer on the immersive theatre pieces STRATA, OjO and DODO, produced by the Bricolage Production Company.

== Life and career ==
Cody was born in Juneau, Alaska. She spent her youth there and in Upstate New York before moving to North Carolina. She attended the University of North Carolina School of the Arts, and after graduating moved to New York City.

In New York, she worked for Broadway producer Stuart Thompson and as the personal assistant to playwright David Hare. Her first play, Crush the Infamous Thing: The Adventures of the Hollywood Four, was optioned by Broadway producer Randall Wreghitt, and she starred in the world premiere production at the Coconut Grove Playhouse in Miami, Florida.

In 2007, Cody moved to Pittsburgh, PA, where she wrote and produced the short film "Mombies" for the feature Greetings From Pittsburgh: Neighborhood Narratives. With her husband and partner Sam Turich, she wrote, produced and directed the feature film Progression. Her work for theatre continued: Quantum Theatre produced her play Fat Beckett (in which she starred with collaborator Rita Reis), which was published by Playscripts, Inc. Her plays The Alchemists' Lab and Prussia: 1866 were produced at the Pittsburgh Playhouse. She served as Lead Writer on the immersive theater pieces STRATA, OjO and DODO with Bricolage Production Company. STRATA was named a number one production of the year by the Pittsburgh Post-Gazette, and appeared on the cover of American Theatre Magazine. OjO premiered at the Three Rivers Arts Festival in 2014 and was produced at the Without Walls Festival at the La Jolla Playhouse in 2015. DODO premiered at the Carnegie Museum of Natural History and Carnegie Museum of Art in October, 2017. Her autobiographical, multimedia non-traditional documentary Inside Passage premiered at Quantum Theatre on March 2, 2018.

She is the originating organizer of The Monologue Project to increase the canon of audition monologues for women of the African Diaspora. The Monologue Project is hosted by the Bishop Arts Theater Center and has been performed in Pittsburgh, Dallas and at the Dramatists Guild of America National Conference in New York City.
