= Hiawatha Project =

Theatre company in Pittsburgh, Pennsylvania

Hiawatha Project is a professional theatre company located in Pittsburgh. Established in 2010 by Anya Martin and Michelle Carello, the company's mission is to "create original performances exploring specific social questions through myth, free association, and movement." Hiawatha Project's premiere production of Camino, an original play by Martin, was researched, developed, and had a workshop presentation in 2008 and 2009, had a public reading in August 2010, and received a full production in September 2011 at Dance Alloy Theater. Inspired by the true experiences of Milton Mejia and Stephany McMullen, the production is the first in a series of planned productions that connect the experience of living in Pittsburgh to larger social questions. A production exploring the contemporary role of parenthood titled Helicopter Parents Anonymous is planned for 2013.

== See also ==
Theatre in Pittsburgh
