= Future Ten =

Future Ten is an annual ten-minute play festival located in Pittsburgh, Pennsylvania. Established in 2003 by Future Tenant, an organization that showcases art projects from a variety of disciplines, the festival presents 8-10 plays selected from an anonymous review process. The festival was initially held in a storefront space on Liberty Avenue in downtown Pittsburgh but is now held in a space on Penn Avenue. The festival has grown in recognition over the years and received praise from such publications as Pittsburgh Post-Gazette and Pittsburgh City Paper.

== See also ==
Theatre in Pittsburgh
