= Barebones productions =

Barebones productions is a professional theatre company in Pittsburgh, Pennsylvania which produces contemporary plays. Its mission is to "facilitate the growth of local theater artists through the production of challenging, entertaining, thought-provoking plays and attracts new young theater audiences by employing minimal production elements for maximum impact."

== History ==
Founded in 2003 by Patrick Jordan and Beth Hersey, the company has mounted productions in various locations around Pittsburgh as well as performed James McManus's Cherry Smoke at the Edinburgh Fringe Festival in Scotland in 2007.

The theatre company's productions have been recognized as important to Pittsburgh's cultural scene and have received praise from the Pittsburgh Post-Gazette, the Tribune Review, City Paper, and the Observer-Reporter.

== See also ==
Theatre in Pittsburgh
