= The Summer Company =

American theatre company

The Summer Company is a Pittsburgh-based theatre company that produces classical and contemporary plays. Established in 1993 by Steve Fatla, Jay Keenan, and John E. Lane, Jr., the company was initially founded with the mission “to produce quality productions of classical and soon to be classic plays in the company of friends concentrating on plays written between 1850 through 1950” and has since expanded to include more recent material, including the original musical Homeless: The Musical. The company has produced material with varying stylistic content, including absurdism, realism, and comedic revues. The Summer Company's productions have been held at performance spaces located on the campuses of Duquesne University and Carlow University.

== See also ==
- Theatre in Pittsburgh
