= Jewish Theatre of Pittsburgh =

Jewish Theatre of Pittsburgh is a Pittsburgh-based theatre company that produces theatre from a Jewish perspective. Established in 2001 by Tito Braunstein, the company held productions in the Jewish Community Center in Squirrel Hill until 2007, when it went dark. In 2011, the theater re-formed with a new board of directors and began producing plays at the Rodef Shalom Congregation in Shadyside. The theatre has produced established plays such as Israel Horovitz's Lebensraum, Arthur Miller's The Price, and Alfred Uhry's The Last Night of Ballyhoo, as well as newer works such as Aaron Posner's The Chosen and Amy Hartman's Mazel and musicals such as That's Life and Jason Robert Brown's The Last Five Years.

== See also ==
- Theatre in Pittsburgh
