= Rob Penny =

American poet

- Born: Robert Lee Penny; August 6, 1941; Opelika, Alabama, United States
- Died: March 16, 2003 (aged 61); Pittsburgh, Pennsylvania, U.S.
- Occupations: Writer and academic
- Spouse: Timau Betty Penny
- Children: Johnny Penny, Robert Lee Penny Jr., and Kadumu Penny
- Relatives: Roy Lee Penny Sr., Jefferson Davis Penny Jr., Ann Penny, and Betty Jean Penny
- Writing career
- Genre: African American Drama

Robert Lee "Rob" Penny (August 6, 1941 – March 16, 2003) was an American playwright, poet, social activist, and professor. Penny wrote more than 30 plays and 300 poems.

== Early life ==
Penny was born in Opelika, Alabama, on August 6, 1941. He moved to Pittsburgh, Pennsylvania's Hill District as a toddler, where he was raised. A 1957 graduate of Central Catholic High School (Pittsburgh, Pennsylvania), Penny had childhood aspirations of joining the priesthood.

== Academic life ==
Penny was in the first cohort of Black Studies faculty hired in 1968 by Jack L. Daniel, Ph.D. and Curtiss E. Porter, the co-directors of the University of Pittsburgh's Africana Studies Program.

Porter and Daniel sought to develop a faculty representative of both academia and community. Porter, in particular, himself a creative, drew on Penny's established reputation as a "straight ahead" poet, fusing the incantations of Bebop jazz and street lyricism into hard hitting graphic, terse poetics that spoke to street life.

Emanating from Pittsburgh's fabled Hill District creative arts core, he was a lead voice of The Centre Ave Poets Writer's Workshop, which included others such as Charlie Williams, Nick Flournoy and August Wilson, who would achieve later fame as America's premier African American playwright. Many considered Penny to be Wilson's mentor in those early days. Penny's hire, along with other non-traditionalists academics, such as the choreographer Bob Johnson were part of the push to infuse the Black Studies curriculum with a holistic Black Aesthetic to correspond to an advanced exploration of Black academics that Porter, in particular, thought should comprise Black Studies. After Penny began teaching at the University of Pittsburgh, he was promoted to associate professor in 1971 under the leadership of Porter.

His tenure established a foothold for the increased production of his art. Penny, moved on to serve as chair of its Africana Studies Department from 1978 to 1984 after Porter's resignation from the Chairmanship. Penny was also a founding member of the Africana Studies Department.

== Theatrical contributions ==
In 1968, he and his friend August Wilson, a fellow Pittsburgh poet and playwright, were approached by members of Pitt's Black Action Society (Curtiss E. Porter, Tony Fountain, E. Philip McKain), who had recently obtained funding, to establish the Black Horizons Theater, which staged performances until the mid-1970s. Dr. Vernell A. Lillie founded the Kuntu Repertory Theatre in 1974 as a way of showcasing Penny's plays. Penny was the playwright-in-residence for the Kuntu Repertory Theatre. Today, the theatre continues to hold performances of Penny's plays.

In 1976, he and Wilson co-founded the Kuntu Writers Workshop, which Penny coordinated until his death on March 16, 2003.

The Pittsburgh City Council honored Penny by presenting the Penny family with a key to the City of Pittsburgh for his commitment to social activism, dedication to encouraging youth, and contributions to the greater Hill District community. July 29, 2008, is officially the city of Pittsburgh's Rob Penny Day.

The 62-year-old poet, playwright, teacher and activist died of a heart attack at his Hill District home in Pittsburgh on March 16, 2003.

== Playwright credits ==
Penny's plays have been nationally produced in such theatres as the aforementioned Kuntu Repertory Theatre, Chicago's ETA / Creative Arts Foundation, Inc. New York's New Federal Theatre founded by Dr. Woodie King Jr. as well as Brooklyn, New York's celebrated Billie Holiday Theatre, the 2000 world premiere of Nefertari Rising was also directed by King.

=== Selected plays ===
- Among the Best: The Pittsburgh Crawfords and the Homestead Grays
- Bad News
- Blue Yonder
- Boppin' With The Ancestors
- Clean Drums
- Coon Can
- Dance of the Blues Dead
- Deeds of Blackness
- Depths of Her Star, The
- Diane's Heart Dries Out Still More
- Good Black Don't Crack
- Good Quick Feel-and Then We Build upon a Plan, A
- Killin’ and Chillin’
- Life Rise
- Little Willie Armstrong Jones
- Nefertari Rising
- Night of the Hawk
- Reflections: Rob Penny’s Forum in Flight
- Republic of New Africa, The
- Slow Lives On A Humdrum
- Sugar and Thomas
- Sun Rising on the Hill District
- Take on a Life
- Trip, A
- Uhh Survival Energy
- Up to Life
- Way, The
- Who Loves the Dancer

== Sources ==
- Conner, Lynne (2007). Pittsburgh in Stages: Two Hundred Years of Theater. Pittsburgh: University of Pittsburgh Press. ISBN 978-0-8229-4330-3.
