= Unseam'd Shakespeare Company =

Unseam'd Shakespeare Company is a professional theatre company located in Pittsburgh, Pennsylvania. Founded in 1993, the theatre's mission is to "rediscover and reinvent classic and classically inspired plays for modern audiences and present these plays in artistically ambitious and innovative productions." A member of the Shakespeare Theatre Association of America, the company has produced classic works by Shakespeare, Ibsen, and Brecht, as well as contemporary plays inspired by classic works such as Paula Vogel's Desdemona, A Play about a Handkerchief. Some of these contemporary plays have included premiere productions by Pittsburgh playwrights, such as Amy Hartman's Mad Honey, Anya Martin's Teatro Latino de Pittsburgh, and Wali Jamal's Braddock '76. The company has received praise from local publications such as Pittsburgh Post-Gazette, Pittsburgh Tribune-Review, City Paper, and Pittsburgh Magazine and has received recognition for their own productions as well as productions in conjunction with the Pittsburgh New Works Festival. The company has also received national and international attention, having been featured in the Edinburgh Fringe Festival and the National Performing Arts Conference.

== See also ==
- Theatre in Pittsburgh
