= Mountain Playhouse =

Theatre company in Pennsylvania

Mountain Playhouse is Pennsylvania's oldest professional summer stock theatre company and is located in Jennerstown, Pennsylvania. Housed in a restored 1805 gristmill, the theatre was founded by James Stoughton in 1939. It produces musicals, farces, and dramas each summer and also hosts productions by Theatreworks USA. As stated on its website, the theatre employs "actors from Actors' Equity Association, directors from the Stage Directors and Choreographers Society, and musicians from the American Federation of Musicians." Mountain Playhouse has employed many actors from the nearby Pittsburgh theatre scene, New York City, and Washington, D.C.

== See also ==
Theatre in Pittsburgh
