= Pittsburgh Savoyards =

Theater company in Pittsburgh, Pennsylvania

The Pittsburgh Savoyards are a theater company based in Pittsburgh, Pennsylvania. Founded in 1938 (one year before Pittsburgh Opera), they are currently the oldest theater company in the Pittsburgh area, performing a repertoire of mainly Gilbert and Sullivan operettas. The current headquarters of the company is located in the nearby borough of Bellevue, Pennsylvania.

== History ==
The Pittsburgh Savoyards were founded in 1938 and gave their first performance, The Pirates of Penzance, on May 9, 1939, at the Twentieth Century Club in the Oakland neighborhood of Pittsburgh. The company has had a few notable alumni in its history, including actor Burt Mustin and opera singer Mimi Lerner.
