= Stage Right =

Stage Right is a theatre company located in the Fox Chapel area of Pittsburgh, Pennsylvania. Established in the mid-1960s, the theatre has staged productions of contemporary plays such as Alan Ayckbourn's Absurd Person Singular, Ken Ludwig's Leading Ladies, Paul Rudnick's I Hate Hamlet, and Yasmina Reza's 'Art'. Stage Right's productions are held in the Boyd Community Center in O'Hara Township and utilizes local actors from Pittsburgh's theatre scene. The company has also produced plays in conjunction with the Pittsburgh New Works Festival.

== See also ==
Theatre in Pittsburgh
