= Terra Nova Theatre Group =

Terra Nova Theatre Group is a theatre company located in the area of Pittsburgh, Pennsylvania, founded by William Cameron. Originally located in Washington, PA, the company has also utilized the Grey Box Theatre in Pittsburgh. Terra Nova has produced full productions of both established and new plays, some of them by such Pittsburgh-based playwrights as Tammy Ryan and Cameron himself. The company has encouraged the development of many new works by local playwrights, holding a reading series during the summer called Friday Night 'Wrights. Terra Nova has also sponsored a reading series called the Underground Readings, which was held during the 2011 run of its production of Cameron's Violet Sharp.

== See also ==
Theatre in Pittsburgh
