= Kuntu Repertory Theatre =

African American theatre

- Formation: 1974
- Type: Theatre group
- Location: Pittsburgh, PA
- Artistic director: Vernell A. Lillie
- Website: https://web.archive.org/web/20131208220613/http://www.kuntu.org/

Kuntu Repertory Theatre was a primarily student-based, African-American repertory theatre in Pittsburgh, Pennsylvania, United States.

Dr. Vernell A. Lillie founded it in 1974 at the University of Pittsburgh as a way of showcasing the playwright Rob Penny. The next year Penny's friend, August Wilson, brought his play Homecoming to Kuntu; it was his first play to be produced by a resident company. The theater group remained part of the University of Pittsburgh's Department of Africana Studies through the 2010-2011 season when Lillie retired as a professor at Pitt.

Wilson, Penny, and poet Maisha Baton also started the Kuntu Writers Workshop to bring African-American writers together in discussion and to assist them in publication and production.

The Kuntu Repertory Theatre has won multiple awards, including several Onyx and People's Choice awards from the African American Council of Theatre The company has also participated in the Pittsburgh New Works Festival.

Kuntu's primary venues when based at the University of Pittsburgh were the Stephen Foster Memorial, and later, through the 2010-11 season, the seventh-floor auditorium of the university's Alumni Hall. In 2011 Kuntu moved to a new home at the Carnegie Library of Pittsburgh's Homewood branch. Due to funding difficulties, the Kuntu Repertory Theatre announced it was closing after the 2012-2013 season.

== Alumni ==
- Esther Rolle
- Glynn Turman
- Mark Southers
- Rob Penny
- Sala Udin
- Montae Russell

== See also ==
Theatre in Pittsburgh
