= Organic Theater Pittsburgh =

Organic Theater Pittsburgh is a theatre company located in Pittsburgh, Pennsylvania. It is the first theatre company in Pittsburgh to focus on being "eco-friendly." Founded in 2011 by Jaime Slavinsky, the company's mission is to create an "organic theatre product" through "a unique rehearsal process based on improvisation" and "relying on Earth-friendly, recycled, and sustainable materials & partnering with local artists, merchants, and environmental organizations." The company's first performance, a production of Sarah Ruhl's Dead Man's Cell Phone, was held in ModernFormations on Penn Avenue in July 2011. The organic theme of the company was reinforced by reducing ticket prices for audience members who brought in a used cell phone to recycle. The company has been reviewed in such publications as Broadway World, Out Online, Pittsburgh Magazine, and Pittsburgh City Paper. Organic Theater Pittsburgh uses prominent actors from Pittsburgh's theatre scene. Jaime Slavinsky received recognition in the Post-Gazette's "Performer of the Year" article for her leading performance as Jean in the company's inaugural production of Dead Man's Cell Phone.

Organic Theater Pittsburgh's production of Dead Man's Cell Phone was named 2011's "Best Debut of a New Company" by the Pittsburgh Post-Gazette.

On January 30, 2012, Organic Theater Pittsburgh in conjunction with Dramatist's Guild of America hosted the event "From the Ground UP!" in which 12 local theater companies and 12 local playwrights were introduced to encourage future local collaborations.

== See also ==
- Theatre in Pittsburgh
