= Pittsburgh Musical Theater =

Pittsburgh Musical Theater (PMT) is a professional theatre company located in Pittsburgh, Pennsylvania. Founded in 1990, the company has since expanded with the educational programs offered by the Richard E. Rauh Conservatory of Musical Theater. The Conservatory offers musical theatre classes to young people which are taught by local professionals. PMT also does matinee performances for local high schools.

The company has mounted productions of musicals from all eras and genres in numerous locations throughout Pittsburgh, such as the New Hazlett Theater, the Stephen Foster Memorial, Antonian Theatre, Hartwood Tent, Fulton Theatre, City Theatre, Papa J's Mercato, and the Byham Theater, where it is currently in residence.

In 2013, the organization announced plans to purchase the James Centre in Pittsburgh's West End as a space for classes and performances.

== See also ==
- Theatre in Pittsburgh
