= Pittsburgh Playwrights Theatre Company =

Pittsburgh Playwrights Theatre Company is a professional theatre company located in Pittsburgh, Pennsylvania, United States. Founded in 2003 by artistic director Mark Clayton Southers, the company originally held productions at the Penn Theater in Garfield and moved to a new space on Penn Avenue in Pittsburgh's Cultural District. Between 2011 and 2018, it held productions in a space on Liberty Avenue in the same building used by Bricolage Production Company, as well as the August Wilson Center for African American Culture, where Southers was artistic director of theatre initiatives, and at other locations. In 2022, it moved into the former Madison Elementary School in Pittsburgh's historic Hill District.

The theatre's mission is to develop and showcase works by Pittsburgh playwrights, ranging from August Wilson and George Kaufman to new unknown playwrights, and to "nurture a racially and culturally diverse community of playwrights, directors, actors and technical specialists to hone their craft and to network creative opportunities." The company has had premiere productions of works by such Pittsburgh playwrights as Tammy Ryan, Kim El, Marlon Youngblood, Brendon Bates, Wali Jamal, and Ray Werner. The theatre company is also well known for its annual Theatre Festival in Black & White, in which white directors direct one-act plays by black playwrights and black directors direct one-act plays by white playwrights. The company has also sponsored series of readings by local playwrights.

== See also ==
Theatre in Pittsburgh
