= PICT Classic Theatre =

Theatre company in Pittsburgh

PICT (formerly known as Pittsburgh Irish & Classical Theatre) was founded in 1996 by Andrew S. Paul and Stephanie Riso in Pittsburgh. PICT has emerged as a significant contributor to the cultural fabric of Pittsburgh with almost 2,000 season subscribers, and annual attendance of over 23,000. A constituent member of Theatre Communications Group (TCG), PICT has garnered a yearly position on the Pittsburgh Post-Gazette's list of the city's Top 50 Cultural Forces. The organization's productions are consistently ranked among the year's best by the critics of the Post-Gazette, Pittsburgh Tribune-Review and Pittsburgh City Paper. PICT was named Theatre of the Year-in both 2004 and 2006 by the critics of the Pittsburgh Post-Gazette. Following the 2007 season, feature actor David Whalen was named the Pittsburgh Post Gazette's 24th theatrical Performer of the Year. As of October 15, 2014, PICT has produced 89 main stage shows, including five world premieres, seven U.S. premieres, thirty-eight Pittsburgh premieres and four festivals.

In 2013 Alan Stanford was named the Artistic and Executive Director. PICT performs in the Stephen Foster Memorial building - a City of Pittsburgh and Pennsylvania state Historical Landmark located on Forbes Avenue on the campus of the University of Pittsburgh.

The building houses the Stephen Foster Memorial Museum, the Center for American Music, as well as two theatres: the 478-seat Charity Randall Theatre and 151-seat Henry Heymann Theatre.

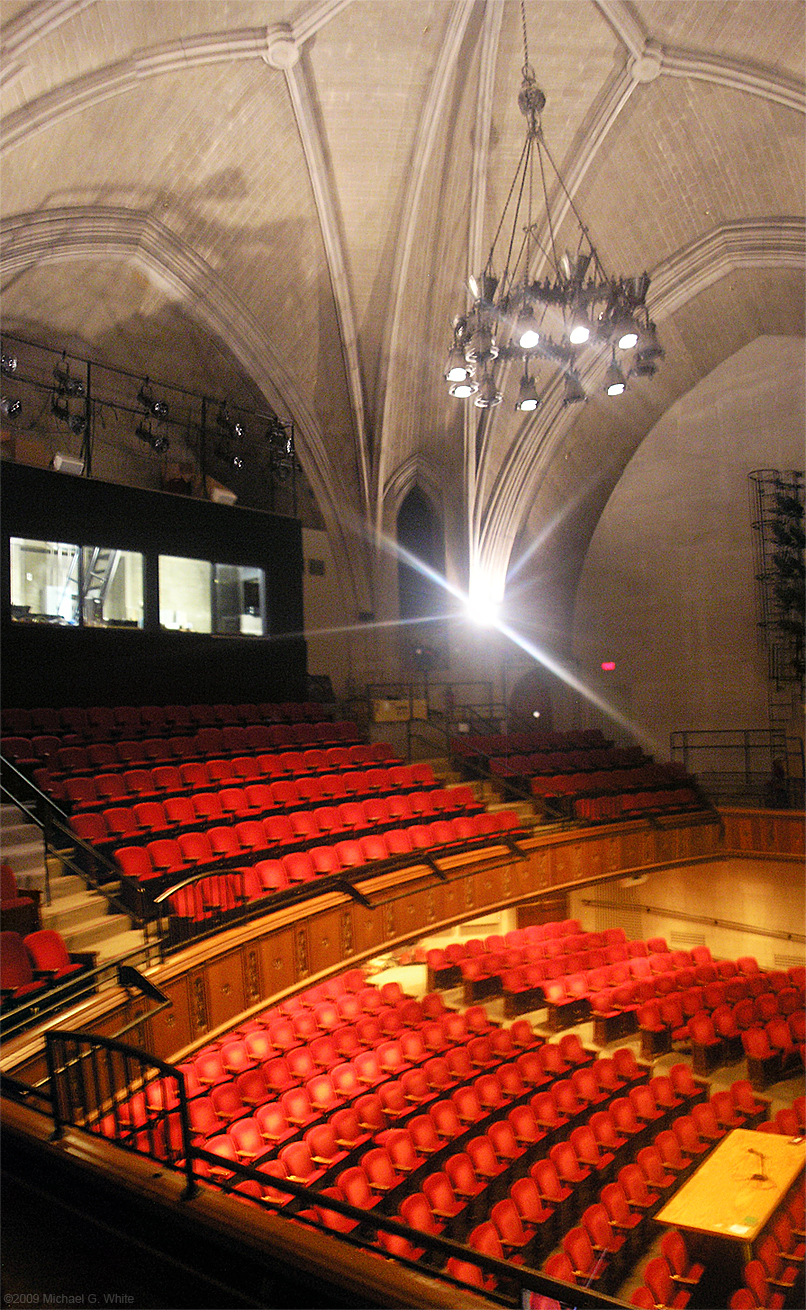
Charity Randall Theatre

In 2015 PICT introduced its "Downtown Series" presenting two productions at the Peirce Studio in the Trust Arts Education Building.

== Previous Productions ==
2014
Blithe Spirit
Waiting for Godot (Runner up for Pittsburgh Post Gazette's Best Play of 2014
Woman and Scarecrow (Pittsburgh Premiere)
Observe the Sons of Ulster Marching Towards the Somme
Macbeth (Most highly attended production in PICT history)
Great Expectations

In 2014 PICT was honored by having 10 actors and designers included in the Pittsburgh Post Gazette's 2014 "Best of" Round Up

2013
A Skull in Connemara
Don Juan Comes Back from the War
The Kreutzer Sonata
Lady Winderemere's Fan
Our Class
Sherlock Holmes and the Crucifer of Blood

2012
The School for Lies
Chekhov Festival
The Vibrator Play (Pittsburgh Premiere)
Equivocation
The Pitmen Painters

2011
Antony and Cleopatra
House and Garden
The Importance of Being Earnest
Race
Sherock Holmes and the Mask of Moriarty

== See also ==
- Theatre in Pittsburgh
