= Bricolage Production Company =

Bricolage Production Company is a professional theatre company based in downtown Pittsburgh. Established in 2001 by Jeffrey Carpenter, it is located at Community Forge, an inclusive community center in Wilkinsburg, PA. The company's mission is to use Pittsburgh's "distinctive resources" to create theatre that "stimulate[s] a heightened sense of involvement for the audience." Bricolage has held readings and staged productions of numerous new works by playwrights on the Pittsburgh, national, and international theatre scene. Their immersive theatre piece STRATA was named a number one production of the year by the Pittsburgh Post-Gazette, and was featured on the cover of American Theatre Magazine.

Also part of their season are Midnight Radio, a series of live performances of radio scripts performed in front of an audience, and B.U.S. (Bricolage Urban Scrawl), an event in which playwrights, directors, and actors create productions of original short plays within a span of 24 hours. Bricolage has also acted as a host space for other performers and events, such as singer Daphne Alderson, playwright Gab Cody, comedian Gab Bonesso, performance artists Roberto Sifuentes and Guillermo Gómez-Peña, and a PlaySlam hosted by the Dramatists Guild. In 2010, the company introduced an arts education program entitled "Walk the Talk" in conjunction with its production of Speech $ Debate. This program allowed high school students to attend the production at the theatre and participate in discussions with community leaders as well as engage in activities related to playwriting and performing.

Pittsburgh City Council declared July 10, 2012 "Bricolage Day" in honor of the company's contributions to Pittsburgh's cultural scene.

== See also ==
- Theatre in Pittsburgh
