= City Theatre (Pittsburgh) =

Theater company in Pennsylvania, US

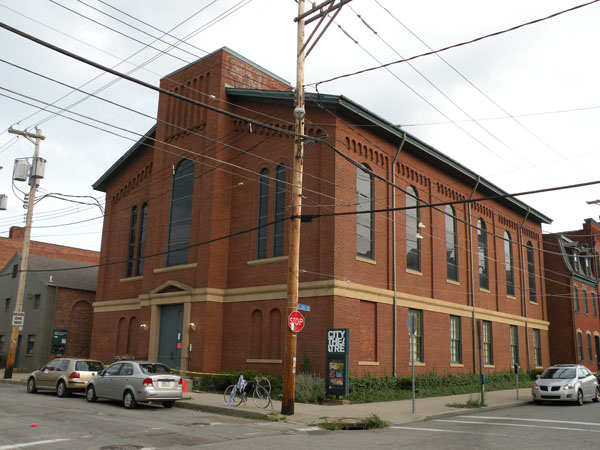

- Location within Pittsburgh
- 40.429267°N 79.985125°W
- Location: 1300 Bingham Street in the South Side Flats neighborhood of Pittsburgh, Pennsylvania, USA

History
- Built: 1859

Pittsburgh Landmark – PHLF
- Designated: 2000

City Theatre is a professional theater company located in Pittsburgh's South Side. It specializes in productions of new plays and has commissioned new works by playwrights on the national theatre scene, including Christopher Durang, Adam Rapp, and Jeffrey Hatcher.

Amidst the economic upheaval of the declining steel industry, the arts emerged as a powerful, unifying response. In 1971, this grassroots momentum led the Pittsburgh Department of Parks and Recreation to secure funding from the National Endowment for the Arts to launch a landmark Free Theatre initiative, offering all Pittsburgh residents free access to both performances and theatre education.

In 1975, the City of Pittsburgh allocated funds to support staffing at the North Side's Allegheny Community Theatre, now the New Hazlett Theatre. The newly formed ensemble shared the venue with the Pittsburgh Public Theater, a joint arrangement that served as the company’s first residency and the foundational launching pad for future seasons. The company's founding artists included several alumni from Carnegie Mellon University’s School of Drama, who appointed Marjorie Walker as the inaugural Artistic Director. With the critical support of Louise R. Brown, Director of the Department of Parks and Recreation, the group secured federal funding through the Comprehensive Employment and Training Act (CETA).

Their debut production was The Life and Death of Sneaky Fitch, a hilarious Western satire written by James Rosenberg, the former head of CMU’s Graduate Drama department.

In 1981, under the artistic direction of Marc Masterson, the company moved to a new performance space on Bouquet Street in Oakland. The company again moved to a new performance space at the former Bingham United Methodist Church in the South Side in 1991, where in addition to its own season it acted as a host space for the earliest productions of the Pittsburgh New Works Festival. Marc Masterson became artistic director of Actors Theatre of Louisville in Kentucky, and Tracy Brigden became artistic director in 2001.

In addition to its mainstage season, City Theatre offers educational outreach programs such as the Young Playwrights Festival, in which selected submitted plays by students in middle school and high school are given professional productions, and City Theatre Playmakers, which provides opportunities for Pittsburgh youth to write radio dramas that are fully produced and broadcast.

== See also ==
Theatre in Pittsburgh
