= Indie music scene =

Localized independent music-oriented community of bands and their audiences

An independent music scene is a localized independent music-oriented (or, more specifically, indie rock/indie pop-oriented) community of bands and their audiences. Local scenes can play a key role in musical history and lead to the development of influential genres; for example, no wave from New York City, United States; Madchester from Manchester, England; and grunge from Seattle.

Indie scenes are often created as a response to mainstream or popular music. These scenes are created in opposition of mainstream culture and music and often contribute to the formation of oppositional identities among individuals involved in the scene.

== Notable scenes ==
=== Asia ===
==== Japan ====
The Japanese indie music scene began gaining mainstream success in the late 1990s with the so-called "indie boom". Musicians involved with this scene, referred to as "individual producer-composers," included Haruomi Hosono, Oyamada Keigo (also known as Cornelius), and Oda Tetsuro. Cornelius pioneered an indie music movement called Shibuya-kei and released songs that gained international success, such as the Pizzicato Five. Supercar's 1998 debut album, Three Out Change, has been described as having "almost foundational importance to 21st-century Japanese indie rock."

A Japanese protectionist licensing policy prevents indie music from being sold via major media distribution networks. Indie records are only sold in small retail stores that import foreign records, which are not part of the industrial channels. This relegates Japanese indie music to the context of a global scene.

Current Japanese indie bands include The Pillows, Asian Kung-Fu Generation, Straightener, Sakanaction, Acidman, fujifabric, and Beat Crusaders.

==== South Korea ====
The indie scene in South Korea is sometimes referred to as "K-Indie", a neologism derived from K-pop. The center of the Korean indie scene is the Hongdae area. Korean indie has gained international exposure via YouTube. Bands and artists include The RockTigers, 10cm, Yozo, Jang Jae-in, Jang Jae-in, Hyukoh, and Jannabi.

=== Australasia ===
==== Australia ====
- Melbourne, Australia:
  - From 1978 to 1981, Melbourne's inner suburbs experienced a thriving experimental post-punk scene known as the Little Band scene. It involved musical artists such as Essendon Airport, Primitive Calculators and Whirlywirld.
  - In the early 2010s, the term "dolewave" was coined to describe an indie scene involving Melbourne groups such as the Twerps and Dick Diver, songs of which share a jangly, lo-fi sound and working-class themes.

==== New Zealand ====
- Auckland, New Zealand: the Zwines scene was based around a nightclub/warehouse called Zwines and was known for punk bands like The Scavengers, The Stimulators and Suburban Reptiles (featuring Midnight Oil's Bones Hillman). Like the British 1980s indie music scene documented on the NME's C86 tape, this punk scene was documented on the AK79 album.
- Dunedin, New Zealand: The Dunedin sound was a style of indie pop music created in the southern New Zealand university city of Dunedin in the early 1980s, characterized by jangly guitars, minimalist basslines and loose drumming. Keyboards are also often prevalent. New Zealand-based Flying Nun Records championed the scene; artists include The Clean (who gave the scene the name Dunedin sound), and The Chills.

=== North America ===
==== Canada ====
- Toronto, Ontario: In the mid-2000s, an influx of independent bands infiltrated the music scene, such as Broken Social Scene, Alvvays, Born Ruffians, Metric, Tokyo Police Club, and Crystal Castles, gaining notoriety at home and abroad.
- Montreal, Quebec: The Montreal music scene has given rise to such musicians and groups as Sean Nicholas Savage, Grimes, Mac DeMarco, BRAIDS, Tegan and Sara, Arcade Fire, Stars, Islands, Plants and Animals, Wolf Parade, Sunset Rubdown, Bell Orchestre, Godspeed You! Black Emperor and Patrick Watson. It is centered on the Mile End neighborhood, in the borough of Le Plateau-Mont-Royal.
- Halifax, Nova Scotia: In the 1990s, Halifax was home to the "Halifax Pop Explosion" scene, including bands such as Sloan, Jale, Thrush Hermit, The Super Friendz and The Hardship Post. After the early scene splintered somewhat in the late 1990s, artists including Joel Plaskett, Wintersleep, In-Flight Safety, and Rich Aucoin formed a second wave in the 2000s.

==== United States ====
- Athens, Georgia: During the early 1980s, Athens became home to influential post-punk bands such as R.E.M., the B-52s and Pylon. Successful indie rock bands in the 1990s were formed in Athens, including The Elephant 6 Recording Company, The Apples in Stereo, The Olivia Tremor Control, Neutral Milk Hotel, and Of Montreal.
- Chapel Hill, North Carolina: The Chapel Hill music scene (which also often includes bands from nearby Research Triangle cities Raleigh and Durham) was home to an indie music scene starting in the mid-1980s with bands like The Connells, Flat Duo Jets and Southern Culture On The Skids. The 1990s saw the rise of indie rock bands such as Polvo, Archers of Loaf and Superchunk which started Merge, an indie record label of the 1990s. The 2000s saw the arrival of bands like Ben Folds Five and Squirrel Nut Zippers. The indie club Cat's Cradle (which originated as a folk cafe in the 1960s) has played a major part in the Chapel Hill music scene, hosting several alternative acts that went on to find major success in the mid-1990s.
- Washington, D.C.: The late 1970s and early 1980s saw the birth of a punk rock-inspired independent music scene in Washington which became influential around the United States, with bands such as Bad Brains, Embrace, Rites of Spring, Henry Rollins and Black Flag, and hardcore punk bands Teen Idles and Minor Threat, members of which founded independent label Dischord Records. The first wave of D.C. independent musicians gradually moved on to developing post-hardcore styles. Members of different Dischord bands formed Fugazi, a prototypical independent band. By the 1990s, Dischord bands such as Shudder to Think began to receive mainstream attention and some signed with major labels
- Los Angeles, California:
  - The Los Angeles indie scene is centered on neighborhoods like Koreatown, Los Feliz, Silver Lake, and Echo Park, which have given rise to such bands and artists as Elliott Smith, Local Natives, Dawes, Moving Units, Rilo Kiley, Earlimart, Autolux, Scarling. and Giant Drag.
  - The Smell scene came up in the 2000s, with bands such as HEALTH, Abe Vigoda, Local Natives, Best Coast, Foster the People, Edward Sharpe and the Magnetic Zeros, Cold War Kids, and No Age.
- Chicago, Illinois: Chicago is home to a number of independent record labels, such as Touch and Go Records, Thrill Jockey Records, and Drag City Records. City funding has made Chicago an important music festival city, hosting music festivals such as Pitchfork Music Festival, Lollapalooza (since 2005), Chicago Blues Festival, and Alehorn of Power; and a weekly Monday music series called "Downtown Sound" at Millennium Park's Jay Pritzker Pavilion, featuring independent acts performing in a theater normally used for classical music. Local radio stations supporting independent music include WXRT-FM and Loyola University Chicago's WLUW. Chicago is home to music media business Pitchfork Media and community radio station CHIRP (Chicago Independent Radio Project).
- New York City: In the late 1970s, New York No Wave arose with bands such as DNA, Teenage Jesus & the Jerks, and James Chance and the Contortions. A second wave of noise rock brought Swans and Sonic Youth. After 2000 in Brooklyn and the Lower East Side of Manhattan, a new scene developed with bands The Strokes, Interpol, LCD Soundsystem, Yeah Yeah Yeahs, Dirty Projectors, Grizzly Bear, Yeasayer, TV on the Radio, and Vampire Weekend. Indie bands have also relocated to join this scene, such as Pavement, Animal Collective, and MGMT. Booker Todd P plays a key role, placing bands in unusual places.
- Baltimore, Maryland: In the early to mid-2000s, several Baltimore indie bands found a wide audience, including Beach House, Lower Dens, Dan Deacon, Celebration, Future Islands, Wye Oak, and Ponytail.
- Seattle, Washington: The Seattle-based record label Sub Pop was home to Nirvana, The Postal Service, and The Shins. A number of indie rock groups have their roots in Seattle, including Modest Mouse, Death Cab for Cutie, Harvey Danger, Fleet Foxes, Band of Horses, Minus the Bear, Citizens, and Pedro the Lion.
- Minneapolis, Minnesota: Minneapolis has had several successful indie acts, including Hüsker Dü, The Replacements, Atmosphere, Tapes 'n Tapes, Cloud Cult, Mason Jennings, Brother Ali, and Hippo Campus.
- Portland, Oregon: Portland has had active indie music since the mid-1990s. In 2007, Slate declared Portland "America's indie rock mecca." Local indie artists include Elliott Smith, The Decemberists, The Shins, Stephen Malkmus, M. Ward, The Helio Sequence, Menomena, The Thermals, Portugal. The Man, Blitzen Trapper, YACHT, Blind Pilot, Sleater-Kinney, and Viva Voce.
- Olympia, Washington: Olympia has also been a founding city of the indie scene, starting with the establishment of Calvin Johnson's K Records in 1982. Other labels in Olympia, such as Kill Rock Stars, followed suit, as did bands such as Calvin's Dub Narcotic Sound System and Beat Happening, Bikini Kill, Bratmobile, Lois, Lync, and Some Velvet Sidewalk.
- Austin, Texas: Austin's indie scene has developed over the years into "the live music capital of the world," with music-related festivals like SXSW, Austin City Limits, and Fun Fun Fun Fest. Local bands include Ghostland Observatory, Spoon, ...And You Will Know Us by the Trail of Dead, Okkervil River, The Wooden Birds, The Black Angels, White Denim, Explosions in the Sky, and older acts such as Daniel Johnston, Bill Callahan and Jad Fair.
- Omaha, Nebraska: Omaha has had an indie scene for the past 15 years, with many bands connected to the indie label Saddle Creek Records owned by Conor Oberst of Bright Eyes. Other bands include Cursive, Neva Dinova, Rilo Kiley, and The Faint.
- Akron, Ohio: The Black Keys, a blues rock band from the city, have had a strong influence on Akron's garage rock scene. Garage rock/blues rock indie bands have been signed to various independent labels in the Highland Square area.
- Pittsburgh, Pennsylvania: In the late 2010s through the 2020s, Pittsburgh's indie scene became a center in the Eastern United States for noise rock, shoegaze, and emo. Artists from this scene including Short Fictions, Feeble Little Horse, and Merce Lemon developed a wide audience during this time. Key venues in the emergence of the scene included Mr. Roboto Project and Mr. Smalls, as well as basement venues in the Oakland neighborhood including The Deli, Hammer House, and Kame House.

=== Europe ===
- Nantes, France: The Soy Festival takes place annually in Nantes in October, with a line-up of mainly avant-rock, noise rock, and experimental rock. The biggest music venue in Nantes is Le Lieu Unique.
- Berlin, Germany became a cultural and musical center where artists moved after 2000, including Peaches, Liars, Devastations, and IAMX. Labels include City Slang Records, and Giant Rooks.
- Hamburg, Germany, was the center of German indie rock in the 1990s, the so-called Hamburger Schule. Around 2000, a second wave of notable acts emerged from Hamburg, such as Tocotronic, Die Sterne, Die Goldenen Zitronen (who had been around since the 1980s), Blumfeld, Tomte, and Kettcar. Labels include Grand Hotel van Cleef and Tapete Records.
- Barcelona, Spain, is known for its yearly Primavera Sound Festival, partly curated by ATP and Pitchfork Media. Some of the city's indie artists include Family, Los Planetas, Love of Lesbian, Antònia Font, and El Guincho.

==== Hungary ====
The Hungarian indie scene is mainly active in the capital city, Budapest. In the early 2000s, Hungary's indie revival included Ligeti's The Puzzle from Kaposvár. In 2006 Amber Smith's album RePRINT was released by the German label Kalinkaland Records. In 2007, The Moog's Sold for Tomorrow was released by the US label MuSick Records. Other indie bands include EZ Basic, The KOLIN, Supersonic, The Poster Boy and Dawnstar.

==== Sweden ====
A number of Swedish indie musicians have become famous internationally, mostly singing in English. The Cardigans gained early success in the mid-1990s. Some notable acts include: The Sounds, Lykke Li, Robyn, The Tallest Man on Earth, The Hives, Eskobar, The Soundtrack of Our Lives, Kent, First Aid Kit, Air France, Jens Lekman, The Knife, Shout Out Louds, The Radio Dept., Fever Ray, The Tough Alliance, and Life on Earth.

==== United Kingdom ====
- One of the first scenes recognized as being associated with the term 'indie music' rather than post-punk, new wave or new music was C86, named after the release of the C86 cassette, a 1986 NME compilation featuring Primal Scream and other bands. The significance of C86 is recognized in the subtitle of its 2006 extended reissue: CD86: 48 Tracks from the Birth of Indie Pop. C86 was a document of the UK indie scene at the start of 1986, and it gave its name to the indie pop scene that followed, which was a major influence on the development of indie music as a whole. Significant record labels included Creation, Subway and Glass.
- The shoegazing scene of the late 1980s was named for band members' tendency to stare at their feet and guitar effects pedals onstage rather than interact with the audience. My Bloody Valentine and others created a loud "wash of sound" that obscured vocals and melodies with long, droning riffs, distortion, and feedback. Within the same decade, labels such as Cheree Records and Ché Trading amalgamated into an entity that the industry now refers to as Rocket Girl, which has since contributed significantly.
- The end of the 1980s saw the Madchester scene. Based around The Haçienda, a nightclub in Manchester owned by New Order and Factory Records, Madchester bands such as Happy Mondays and the Stone Roses mixed acid house dance rhythms, Northern soul and funk with melodic guitar pop.
- The Britpop scene developed in the early 1990s as part of a larger British cultural movement called Cool Britannia. In the wake of the musical invasion into the UK of American grunge bands, British bands positioned themselves as an opposing musical force. Influenced by the key British band of the 1980s, the Smiths, and adopting the unashamed commercial approach to which the C86 bands had seemed sometimes ideologically opposed, Britpop acts such as Oasis, Blur, Suede and Pulp referenced British guitar music of the past and aimed at writing about British topics and concerns. Commentary on Britpop noted a north–south divide, with The Good Mixer pub in Camden Town strongly identified with the Britpop scene in the south, though Oasis were signed to Creation Records in nearby Primrose Hill.
- Trip hop is a genre of electronic music that originated in the early 1990s in Bristol. The most notable artists are Massive Attack, Tricky and Portishead.
- Thamesbeat was an early 2000s scene based around Eel Pie Island in London featuring acts like Jamie T, Larrikin Love and Mystery Jets.
- In Liverpool, a 'cosmic Scouse' scene (sometimes referred to as 'Scallydelica') developed in the 2000s with neo-psychedelia acts like the Coral, record labels like Deltasonic and Skeleton Key and events like the annual Liverpool International Festival of Psychedelia (also known as PZYK). Sometimes the scene would be expanded to include acts such as the Bees and the Earlies under the 'Shroomadelica' definition
