= Tamás Szabó (musician) =

- Born: Tamás Szabó; 10 April 1984 (age 42); Budapest, Hungary
- Genres: Indie rock
- Instruments: vocals, keyboards
- Years active: 2004–present
- Formerly of: The Moog

Tamás Szabó (born 10 April 1984) is a musician best-known as the lead singer, songwriter, lyricist, and keyboardist of The Moog.

== Early life and personal life ==
Szabó was born in Budapest, Hungary.

== The Moog ==
Szabó formed The Moog with his secondary school classmates Gergő Dorozsmai and Ádám Bajor in 2004. Later, Csaba Szabó and Norbert Ladányi joined the band.

In an interview with Velvet, Szabó described as lukewarm and compared the Hungarian music scene to the activities of the Hungarian MP, Erzsébet Pusztai.

In 2012, The Moog toured in the United States playing shows with B-52's. In an interview with the Hungarian Origo, Szabó said that after the gigs a lot of middle-age women wanted photos with the band. Szabó added that now they have to focus on middle age women as the target audience rather than teenage girls as the band was doing it before.

In an interview with the Hungarian Marie Claire, Szabó said when they were signed by the American label Musick Records and they could finish their first record with Jack Endino, they were really frightened for the first time. But later they found Endino as a father-type friendly person who was eating crisps and had a worn T-shirt.

On 11 January 2013, Szabó was interviewed by Magyar Rádió, where he was asked about his experience with touring in the United States with the B-52's.

In 2014, Szabó said in an interview with 444.hu, that he likes the homosexual disco and the dark-rock guitar sound, claiming that his musical style cannot be easily categorized.

== Discography ==
With The Moog:

Albums

- Sold for Tomorrow (2007)
- Razzmatazz Orfeum (2009)
- Seasons in the Underground (2012)

Singles

- You Raised The Vampire (2009)

With Nibiru:

- Nibiru (2013)

== Other activities ==
In 2014, Szabó launched his own clothing brand called T'arts.

In 2014, Szabó collaborated with Hungarian-Albanian indie artist Alba Hyseni and The Buckingham project.

== Instruments ==
=== Keyboards ===
- Moog synthesizer

== See also ==
- Budapest indie music scene
- The Moog
- Imre Poniklo
- Árpád Szarvas
