= Maennerchor =

German-influenced American men's chorus

Maennerchor or Männerchor (German pronunciation: [ˈmɛnɐˌkoːɐ̯], "men's chorus") is the name given to German social clubs, primarily in the Northeastern United States, Pennsylvania in particular. The earliest forms of these clubs where "singing societies" that perpetuated traditional choral music, both German and German-American culture, providing Gemütlichkeit for new immigrants. Such clubs are typically attended by men and many function as a restaurant and bar, serving German foods and beers.

The Teutonia Männerchor was chartered in 1854 in Deutschtown, East Allegheny, on the north side of Pittsburgh. It has been at its current location since 1888, which is registered as a historic landmark. A Maennerchor was established in Cincinnati in 1857 with the merging of the Liedertafel, the Saengerbund, and the Germanic Societies; it was the oldest musical organization of the city. The Indianapolis Maennerchor, founded in 1854 in Indianapolis, is another such organization.

The Damenchor often serves as the Maennerchor auxiliary for women.

== List by state and city ==
- Mäennerchor Club, Taftville, Connecticut
- Germania Männerchor, Chicago, Illinois
- Germania Männerchor Volksfest, Evansville, Indiana
- Indianapolis Maennerchor, Indianapolis, Indiana
- Cleveland Maennerchor, Cleveland, Ohio
- Columbus Maennerchor, Columbus, Ohio
- Kenyon College Männerchor, Gambier, Ohio
- Portsmouth Maennerchor, Portsmouth, Ohio
- Youngstown Maennerchor, Youngstown, Ohio
- West Coplay Maennerchor, Coplay, Pennsylvania
- Doylestown Maennerchor, Doylestown, Pennsylvania
- Concordia Maennechor, Easton, Pennsylvania
- Erie Maennerchor, Erie, Pennsylvania
- Harrisburg Maennerchor, Harrisburg, Pennsylvania
- Norristown Maennerchor, Norristown, Pennsylvania
- Teutonia Maennerchor, Pittsburgh, Pennsylvania
- Apollo Männerchor, Sharon, Pennsylvania
- Houston Saengerbund, Houston, Texas
- Madison Männerchor, Madison, Wisconsin

== See also ==
- Sängerfest
- Nord-Amerikanischer Sängerbund
