= Culture of Pittsburgh =

The culture of Pittsburgh stems from the city's long history as a center for cultural philanthropy, as well as its rich ethnic traditions. In the 19th and 20th centuries, wealthy businessmen such as Andrew Carnegie, Henry J. Heinz, Henry Clay Frick, and nonprofit organizations such as the Carnegie Foundation donated millions of dollars to create educational and cultural institutions.

== Architecture ==
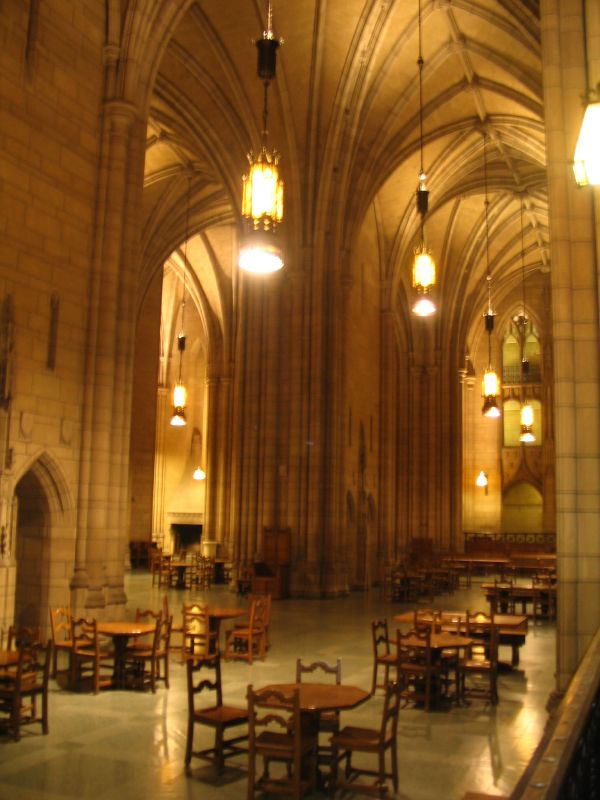
Cathedral of Learning, Pittsburgh, May 14, 2005.

The Frank Lloyd Wright masterpiece Fallingwater is about an hour's drive from Downtown Pittsburgh. The North Shore has an 1895 neogothic church, Calvary Methodist, with an interior designed by Louis Comfort Tiffany. The church's stained glass windows are some of the largest and most elaborate work Tiffany ever created. The Church of the Immaculate Heart of Mary in Pittsburgh, an opulently decorated edifice with elaborate Old World flourishes is one of the finest examples of the so-called Polish Cathedral style, dominating the skyline over Polish Hill. The Allegheny County Courthouse (1886), designed by H.H. Richardson, is a unique and influential building. At 42 stories, the University of Pittsburgh's Cathedral of Learning (1937) is the second tallest collegiate building in the world. The tallest skyscraper in Pittsburgh is the triangular U.S. Steel Tower. Both Acrisure Stadium (2001) and PNC Park (2001) are designed to give fans a view of the city skyline.

== Conventions ==
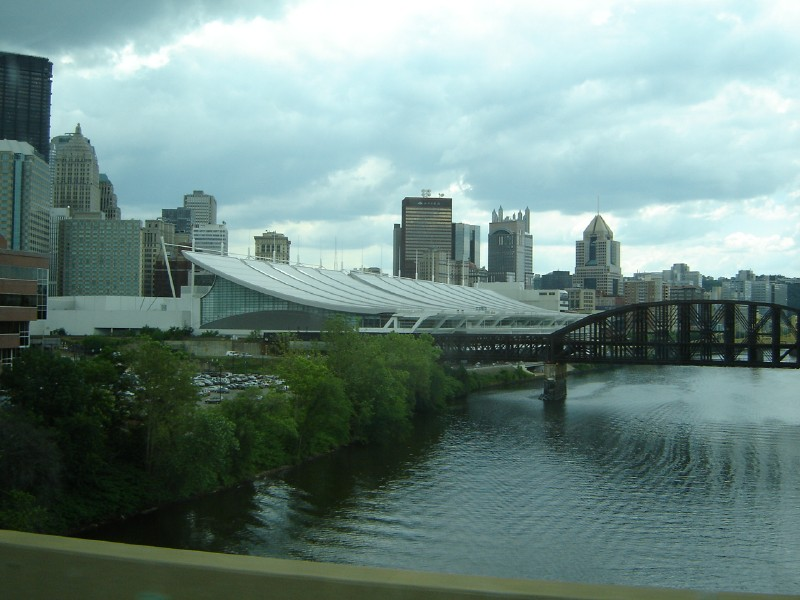
David L. Lawrence Convention Center, as viewed from I-579 bridge.

The David L. Lawrence Convention Center, located on the south bank of the Allegheny River, is able to accommodate all sizes of conventions, exhibitions and conferences. Certified with a Gold rating by the U.S. Green Building Council's Leadership in Energy and Environmental Design initiative, the building is considered the first ever "green" convention center and world's largest "green" building.

== Film ==
The region has hosted over 1,000 film and television works since the first production was filmed in the city in 1898. Since 1990 the Pittsburgh Film Office has marketed the greater southwestern Pennsylvania region as a great location for movie, television and commercial productions. The PFO has assisted more than 102 feature films and television productions to southwestern Pennsylvania to generate an economic impact of more than $575 million for the region.

Pittsburgh Filmmakers teaches media arts and runs three "arthouse" movie theaters and since 1981 the Three Rivers Film Festival has brought national attention to local talent and artists of the region.

== Theatre ==
The Pittsburgh Playhouse at Point Park University has four resident theatre companies. Other theater companies include Bald Theatre Company, barebones productions, Bricolage Production Company, City Theatre, Jewish Theatre of Pittsburgh, Quantum Theatre, Phase 3 Productions, Prime Stage Theatre, Pittsburgh Public Theater, Attack Theater, Unseam'd Shakespeare Company, Terra Nova Theatre Group, Cup-A-Jo Productions, Hiawatha Project, 12 Peers Theater, Organic Theater Pittsburgh, Three Rivers Theatre Company, Carrnivale Theatrics, Theatre Sans Serif, The Summer Company, Throughline Theatre Company, No Name Players, Pittsburgh Musical Theater, Caravan Theatre of Pittsburgh, Pittsburgh Civic Light Opera, Pittsburgh Playwrights Theatre Company, Stage Right, and Pittsburgh Irish and Classical Theatre. The Pittsburgh New Works Festival utilizes local theatre companies to stage productions of original one-act plays by playwrights from all parts of the country. Similarly, Future Ten showcases new ten-minute plays. Saint Vincent Summer Theatre, Off the Wall Productions, Mountain Playhouse, and Stage Right! in nearby Latrobe, Carnegie, Jennerstown, and Greensburg, respectively, employ Pittsburgh actors and contribute to the culture of the region.

August Wilson, one of the best known playwrights of his generation, was a Pittsburgh native. The majority of his plays are set in the city as well including the two he won the Pulitzer Prize for Drama for (Fences (play) and The Piano Lesson).

Friday Nite Improvs, an improv show at the University of Pittsburgh's Cathedral of Learning, is Pittsburgh's longest-running theatre show. It has produced a number of professional writers and actors.

Since 1991, the Gene Kelly Awards have honored students in drama in the region, giving a platform to some who have gone on to both theater and film careers.

== Cuisine ==
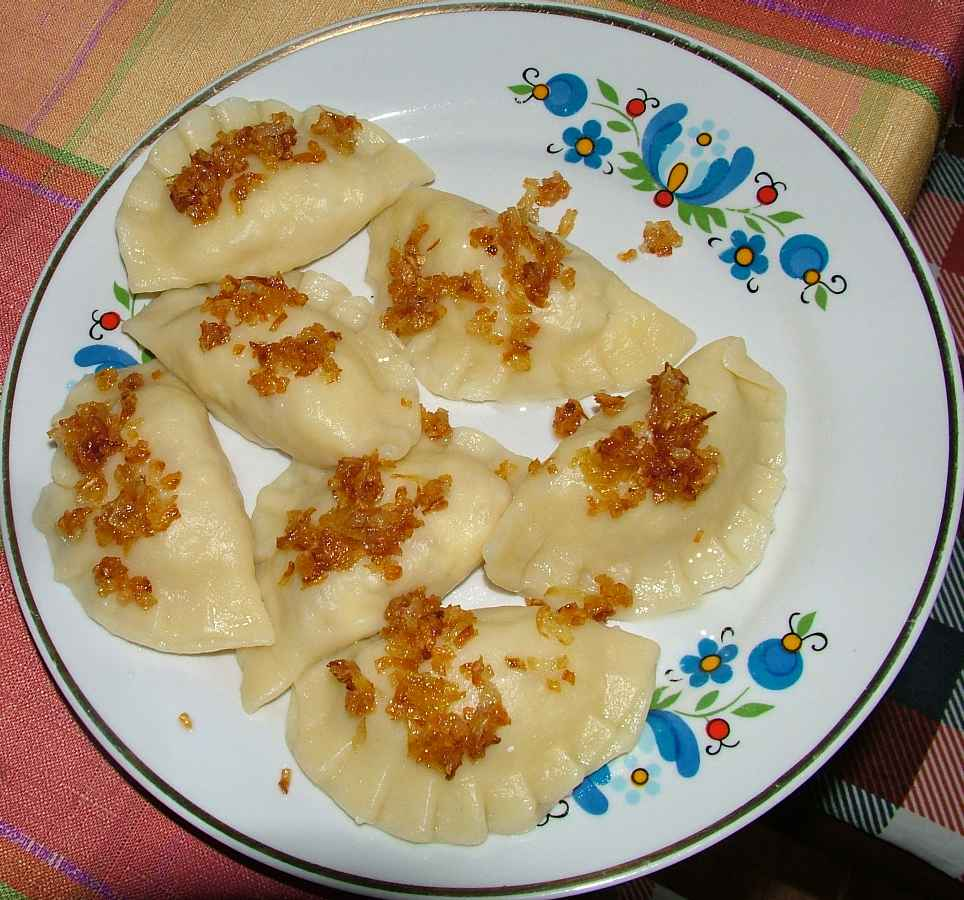
The Slavic-American communities introduced the pierogi to Pittsburgh

Traditional Pittsburgh foods reflect the city's multicultural heritage, especially that of the European immigrants of the early 20th century. While these immigrant populations introduced dishes such as pierogis to the city, they are now enjoyed by Pittsburghers in general. Other Pittsburgh food specialties were developed in the city. In general, these dishes are still popular because for many years, they satisfied the hearty appetite of the archetypal Pittsburgher: the hard-working, blue-collar steelworker.

- Cabbage rolls –(aka Halupki)– Beef, pork, rice, green pepper, wrapped in cabbage and baked with sauerkraut and tomato soup or juice.
- Chipped Ham – (aka Chipped Chopped Ham) thinly sliced processed ham, from Isaly's since 1933.
- City Chicken – cubes of pork and/or veal baked or fried on a wooden skewer.
- Clark Bar – chocolate candy bar; developed in the city in 1917.
- Essie's Original Hot Dog shop - an Oakland staple since 1960. Closed permanently in 2020 amidst the COVID-19 pandemic.
- Halušky – noodles with fried cabbage (Polish), or cottage cheese (Slovak).
- Iron City Beer – native brew; with a shot of whiskey, a boilermaker; with a shot of Imperial, an imp-n-arn.
- Italian sausage – with grilled peppers and onions.
- Kielbasa – Eastern European sausages.
- Pepperoni roll - an Italian American snack made of soft white bread with pepperoni and cheese in the middle. Various shops in the Strip District and Giant Eagle sell this snack in Pittsburgh.
- Pierogi – Polish dish, pasta dough filled with potato and cheese, onion, or sauerkraut.
- Primanti Brothers – sandwich with fries and coleslaw in it.
- Sarris Candies - chocolates and ice cream originating in Canonsburg
- Teutonia Männerchor - Deutschtown (East Allegheny) German food.
- Wholey's – Founded in 1912 in Pittsburgh's Market Square and now located on Penn Ave, Wholey's serves a wide variety of seafood and a famous fish sandwich. The Wholey company has been the anchor and main attraction of the historic "strip District" for over 60 years.

=== Restaurants/nightlife ===
Pittsburgh is home to several nightspots.

- 2014 best restaurants
- 2003 news feature
- 2003 news remembrance feature
- 1998 feature on seafood
- 1994 news feature and a chefs feature from 1994
- News feature on the "new" Hofbrau
- 1984-85 dining guide
- Listing of nightspots from 1978
- Listing of nightspots from 1950, May 1950 and July 1950.
- Listing of nightspots from 1949 and another.
- Listing of nightspots from 1937 and August 1937.
- Hofbrau feature from 1934

== Gardens and parks ==
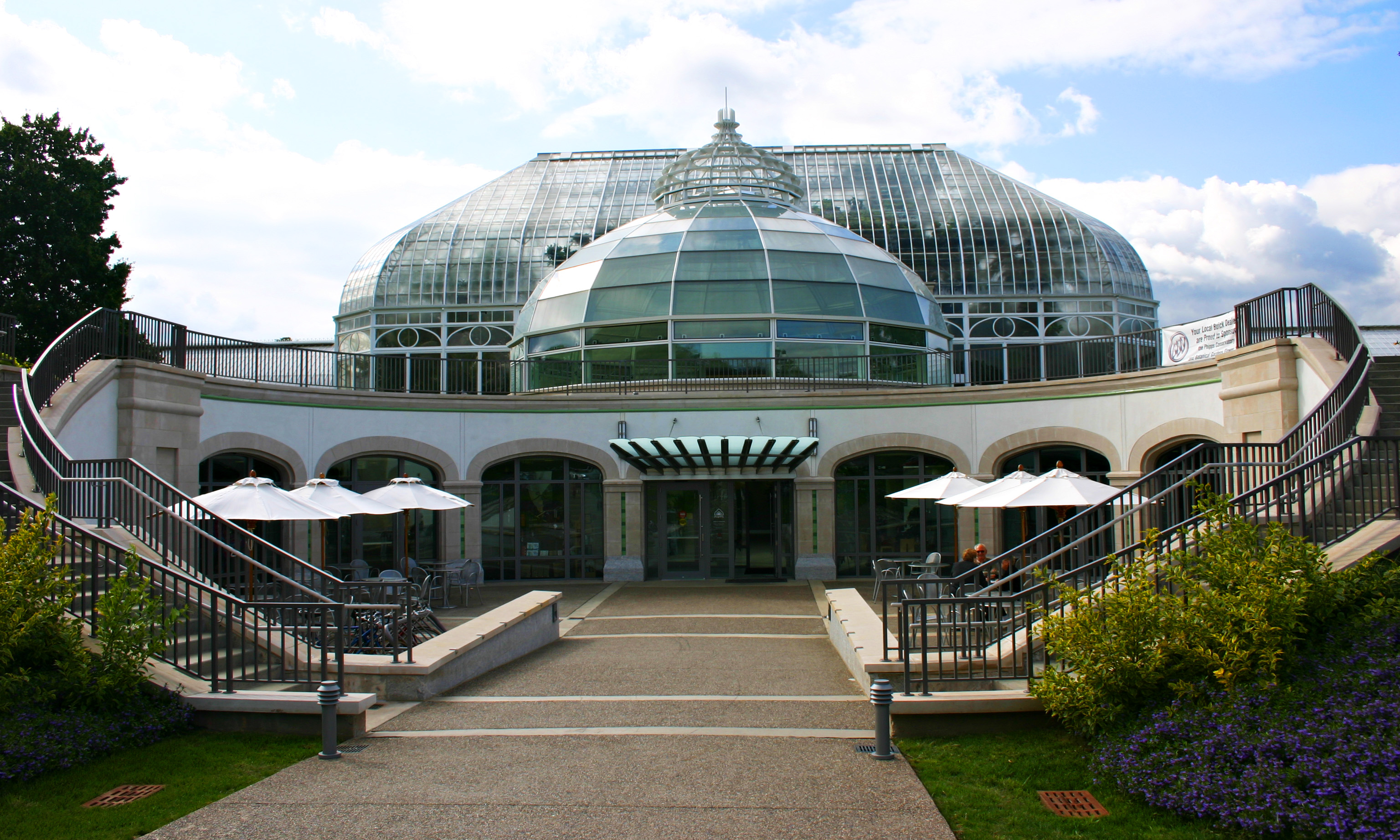
Main entrance to Phipps Conservatory & Botanical Gardens

In addition to numerous large and small neighborhood parks, Pittsburgh has five large city parks covering hundreds of acres:

- Schenley Park in the Oakland and Squirrel Hill neighborhoods. This park contains Phipps Conservatory and Botanical Gardens.
- Frick Park in the Squirrel Hill and Regent Square neighborhoods
- Highland Park is in the neighborhood of the same name. This park contains the Pittsburgh Zoo and PPG Aquarium.
- Riverview Park on the Northside, home to the historic Allegheny Observatory.
- Grand View Scenic Byway Park circling the Mt. Washington and Duquesne Heights neighborhoods.

Several other parks and gardens are in Pittsburgh:

- The National Aviary
- Phipps Conservatory and Botanical Gardens
- Pittsburgh Zoo & PPG Aquarium

== Libraries ==
The city has an extensive library system, both public and university. Most notable are the Carnegie Library of Pittsburgh and the University of Pittsburgh's University Library System.

Many local history materials are available on-line at Historic Pittsburgh, a collection that includes materials from the University of Pittsburgh's University Library System, the Library & Archives of the Historical Society of Western Pennsylvania at the Senator John Heinz Pittsburgh Regional History Center, and the Carnegie Museum of Art. Pittsburgh History is an on-line service maintained by the Carnegie Library of Pittsburgh.

== Literature ==
The poet playwright, and novelist Samuel John Hazo, a Pittsburgh native, founded the International Poetry Forum in his hometown of Pittsburgh, Pennsylvania. Pittsburgh is also renown for its deep and enduring literary culture.

Pittsburgh literary history goes back to the early 20th century, with dozens of prominent authors, the city for a time was considered more closely identified with literature than with steel.

== Music ==
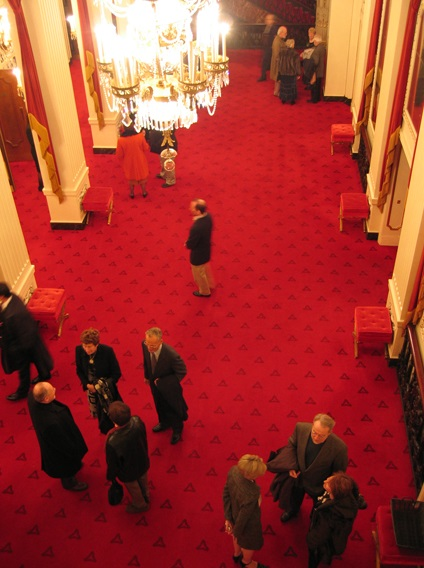
Lobby of Heinz Hall.

The Pittsburgh Symphony Orchestra performs in Heinz Hall, which also plays host to other events throughout the year. The Benedum Center and Heinz Hall provide venues for numerous musicals, lectures, speeches, and other performances, including Pittsburgh Opera. Pittsburgh is also home to one of the few professional brass bands in the world, the River City Brass Band. Other musical arts groups include the Pittsburgh Youth Symphony Orchestra (PYSO) and the River City Youth Brass Band. The Mendelssohn Choir of Pittsburgh is an acclaimed semi-professional choir, with performances that are usually free to the public. The Teutonia Männerchor, founded in 1854 and based in East Allegheny (Deutschtown) furthers choral singing in German and folk dancing.

The Pittsburgh New Music Ensemble (PNME) is an American ensemble dedicated to the performance of contemporary classical music. And the Renaissance and Baroque Society of Pittsburgh hosts early music concerts of artists from across the country.

=== Jazz ===
Pittsburgh became an important gateway between the north, south, east and west of the U.S., playing a strong role in the development of jazz. Jazz came to the city's African American neighborhoods after 1925. The Hill District became known as "Little Harlem" from the 1920s until the early 1950s. There were hundreds of jazz venues in the community, which later helped to promote the emergence of bebop, the most famous was probably the Crawford Grill which nightly attracted top national talent.

A number of influential musicians emerged from the city. Mary Lou Williams, Ahmad Jamal, Erroll Garner, and Billy Strayhorn, who was Duke Ellington's primary musical collaborator for 28 years, came from the city's East End regions of Homewood and East Liberty. A number of musicians came from communities outside the city, including: Maxine Sullivan (Homestead), Sonny Clark (Herminie) and Earl "Fatha" Hines (Duquesne). Vocalist and bandleader Billy Eckstine was one of the first musicians to be paid a $1 million recording contract.

Trumpeter Roy Eldridge, drummer Kenneth Spearman "Klook" Clarke, and influential bassist Ray Brown were born in the city; singer Lena Horne was raised in Pittsburgh. Bassist Paul Chambers, also born in Pittsburgh, played on two of the most important albums in jazz history: Miles Davis' Kind of Blue (1959) and John Coltrane's Giant Steps (1960).

Other noted jazz musicians include: Eric Kloss, Dodo Marmarosa, Walt Harper, Tommy and Stanley Turrentine, Horace Parlan, pianist, Nathan Davis, guitarist George Benson, and drummers Art Blakey, Roger Humphries and Jeff "Tain" Watts. A young Lena Horne also spent her formative years learning jazz and blues in the city's Hill District.

=== Popular music ===
Pittsburgh's role in popular music began with native Stephen Foster and his enduring classics of the 1800s. So influential was Foster's works that he has been called the "Father of American music", has had five films made of his life, has heavily influenced such talents as Nellie Bly and Jackie Gleason and has had two of his songs chosen as state anthems (Kentucky and Florida) as well as the annual selections of Churchill Downs.

Pittsburgh is perhaps most associated for the plethora of Doo Wop artists that were produced during the 1950s and 1960s, thanks in part to local legendary disc jockey Porky Chedwick playing songs that in most other major markets wouldn't risk being played. Several groups such as the Del-Vikings, The Marcels, The Vogues and The Skyliners exemplify the regions doo-wop contributions. During this same era notable solo acts such as Henry Mancini, Perry Como, Dean Martin and Bobby Vinton came out of the region to reach world fame in the industry. A years long engagement at the city's William Penn Hotel also launched the national career of Lawrence Welk.

During the 1970s and 1980s rock era Pittsburgh had a major role in the success of both Wild Cherry and their most popular song/album Play That Funky Music (inspired by a fan's plea to them during a performance at the North Side's 2001 Club in 1976), and being the home to Bret Michaels, known for his fame in the band Poison. Both Joe Grushecky and Donnie Iris achieved one-hit wonder fame and lasting regional rock fame.

Several notable bands emerged from Pittsburgh in the 1990s, including Rusted Root, The Clarks, Don Caballero, and the punk rock bands Anti-Flag and Aus-Rotten. Rusted Root and The Clarks appeared on the Late Show with David Letterman. Formed in 1999, the garage rock group Modey Lemon toured the U.S. and internationally, gaining favorable reviews. Singer Christina Aguilera, a student at North Allegheny Intermediate High School, debuted locally at the 1999 Lilith Fair, before going on to sell over 43 million albums worldwide.

In the 2000s, Anti-Flag produced five albums, signed to RCA Records and appeared several times on the Vans Warped Tour. Rapper Wiz Khalifa, who signed to Warner Bros. Records but left without releasing an album, topped the iTunes singles chart by the end of the decade. Mashup/laptop music artist Girl Talk (Gregg Gillis) found mainstream success. His 2006 album Night Ripper gained favorable reviews and Feed the Animals (2008) topped year end album lists in national media.

Since 2010, solo acts such as natives Jackie Evancho, Slimmie Hendrix, Wiz Khalifa, Daya, and Mac Miller have achieved worldwide fame. Josh Groban was trained in Pittsburgh, having attended Carnegie Mellon University.

While it has historically been overshadowed by other regional scenes, Pittsburgh's Hardcore/Metal scene has gained international attention since the mid-2010s, as witnessed by the critical and commercial success of the band Code Orange. Other popular metal bands from Pittsburgh include Signs Of The Swarm and Those Who Fear.

In the late 2010s and 2020s, many Pittsburgh-based bands involved in the city's local music scene rose to nationwide prominence, including Feeble Little Horse, Short Fictions, and Merce Lemon. This period of time has been marked by an uptick in shoegaze, noise rock, emo, and slowcore music coming from within the local scene, as well.

Hellbender Vinyl, the largest vinyl record manufacturing company in Pennsylvania, is located in Pittsburgh.

== Dance ==
Pittsburgh Dance Council and the Pittsburgh Ballet Theater host a variety of dance events. Polka, folk, square and round dancing have a long history in the city and are celebrated by the internationally famous Duquesne University Tamburitzans, a multicultural academy dedicated to the preservation and presentation of folk songs and dance.

== Museums and art ==
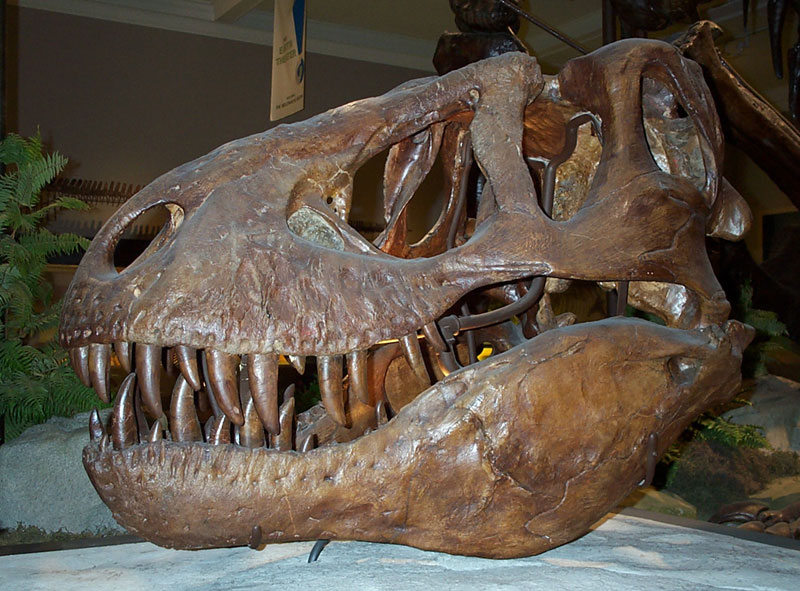
Tyrannosaurus rex skull, Carnegie Museum of Natural History.

Pittsburgh has several visual arts museums, including the Andy Warhol Museum, dedicated to the works of Pittsburgh native Andy Warhol. The Carnegie Museum of Art is home to works by artists including Edgar Degas, Vincent van Gogh, Claude Monet and Robert Adam, along with galleries of sculpture, modern art, the Heinz Architectural Center, a large film and video collection, and various traveling exhibits. Installation art is featured outdoors at ArtGardens of Pittsburgh. The Pittsburgh Center for the Arts shows contemporary art and provides resources for Western Pennsylvania artists.

The town's history museum is the Heinz History Center with an annual attendance of 130,000.

The Carnegie Museum of Natural History, located in Oakland, has extensive dinosaur collections on display, including the most complete Tyrannosaurus rex skeleton ever discovered, and an Egyptian wing. The building may be distinguished by a life-size statue known as, "Dippy the Diplodocus" to the right of the main entrance. Other dinosaur statues are visible around the Pittsburgh area, these were decorated by artists nationwide and sold as a benefit to the Carnegie Museums. The Carnegie Science Center, located in the North Side near PNC Park and Heinz Field, is more technology oriented.

The Children's Museum of Pittsburgh, located on Pittsburgh's Northside, has a variety of interactive exhibits and programs for children and families including a multimedia art studio, Mister Rogers' Neighborhood, water area and theater for performances.

== Recreation ==
Close by the Phipp's Conservatory is the Schenley Park Golf Course, a public golf links. Kennywood Park is widely regarded by rollercoaster enthusiasts to have some of the best rollercoasters in the world, including several early 20th century wooden coasters: the Racer, the Thunderbolt, and the Jackrabbit. A water park owned by Kennywood, Sandcastle, is another local amusement park.

== Counter-culture ==
Pittsburgh has recently gained attention as a burgeoning center for counter-culture, as well as punk music. The annual Pennsic War, the Society for Creative Anachronism's largest re-enactment of pre-17th-century Europe, is hosted nearby. Anthrocon, one of the world's largest furry conventions, returns every summer to the David L. Lawrence Convention Center. The Pittsburgh Cacophony Society is also very active, and in 2008, the Pittsburgh Burning Man community launched a winter regional burn event called Frostburn.

== See also ==
- Cultural District, Pittsburgh
- Pittsburgh Film Office
- Pittsburgh Cultural Trust
- Three Rivers Arts Festival
- Teutonia Männerchor
- Pittsburgh Three Rivers Regatta
- Pittsburgh Center for the Arts
- Pittsburgh Newspapers
- Media in Pittsburgh
- List of radio stations in Pittsburgh
- Sports in Pittsburgh
- Immaculate Heart of Mary in Pittsburgh
- Pittsburgh Parking Chair
