= Hans Balatka =

American conductor and composer

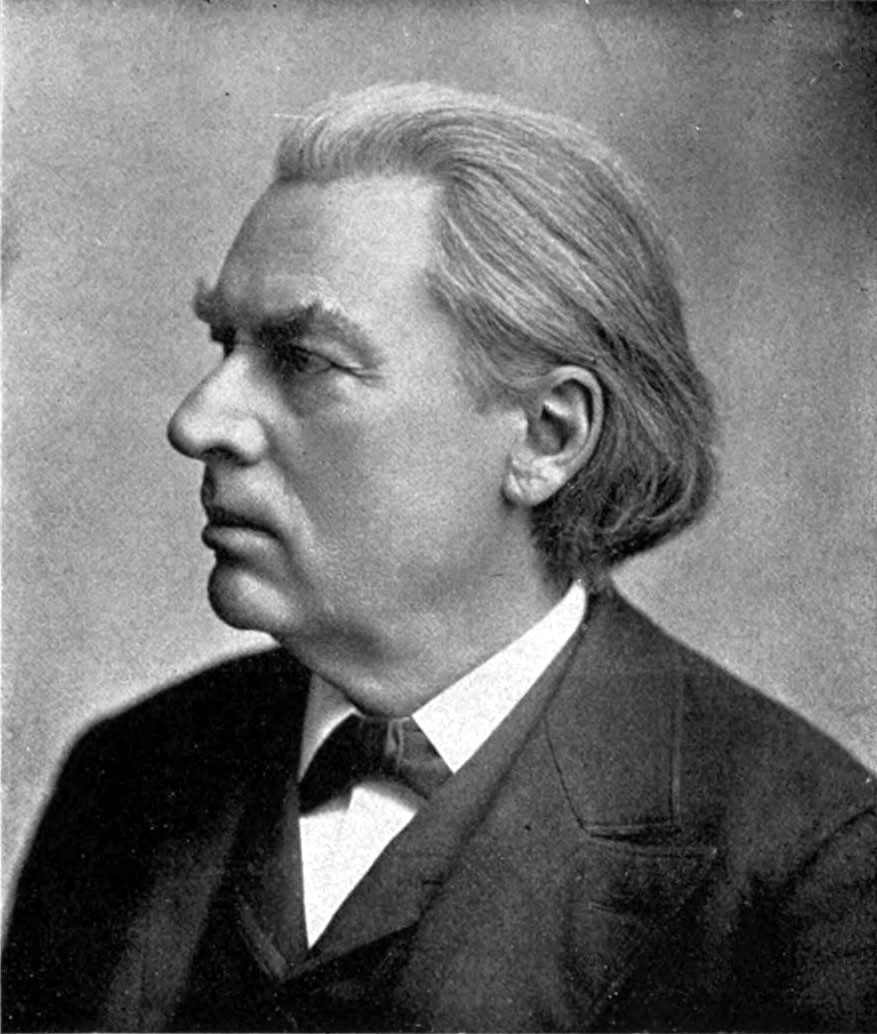
Hans Balatka

Hans Balatka (March 5, 1827 – April 17, 1899) was an American conductor and composer. His efforts contributed much to the great increase in popularity of European classical music in the United States during the late 19th century.

== Life ==
Balatka was born in Hoffnungsthal near Olomouc (today the village of Doly, part of the Bouzov municipality, Czech Republic). His parents were noted musicians. He studied law at Olomouc, and after finishing the course was engaged as tutor by a wealthy family in Vienna. There he also perfected his knowledge of harmony and composition under Simon Sechter und Heinrich Proch.

He began his musical career as conductor for singing societies. He became a member of the Academic Legion during the Revolutions of 1848. After the Vienna Uprising was crushed, he decided to emigrate to the United States. In 1849 he reached Wisconsin and, following a romantic impulse, tried rural life for a spell, but soon settled in Milwaukee, where he conducted the Musical Society (German: Musikverein), founded in 1850, beginning in 1851. He produced several oratorios and operas, and conducted musical festivals in Cleveland, Cincinnati, Detroit, Chicago, and Pittsburgh.

In 1860, he left the Musikverein to become leader of the newly founded Philharmonic Society of Chicago. In 1867 he became director of the Germania Männerchor, and in the same year conducted the group at Nord-Amerikanischer Sängerbund held in Indianapolis, where they performed the works of Franz Abt. In 1868, he directed a musical festival at Chicago, which was pronounced the greatest that had been held in this country up to that time.

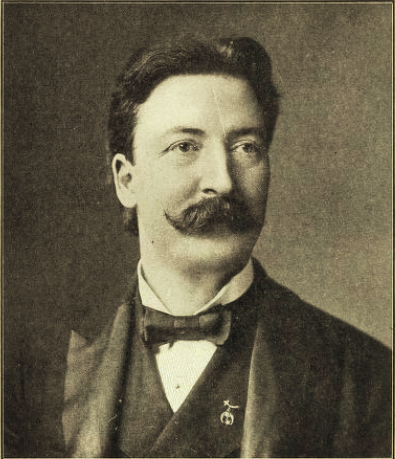
Christian F. Balatka

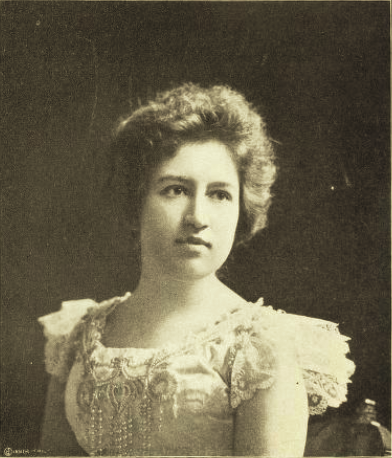
Anna H. Balatka

The Great Chicago Fire of 1871 destroyed his home, and he went on a concert tour for two years. He organized the Liederkranz Society in 1873, and later the Mozart Club and the Chicago Musical Society. He was also director to the Arion des Westen Musical Society and in 1879 he founded the Balatka Academy of Musical Art, in which his son Christian and his daughter Annie were teachers. He conducted a great Saengerfest in Chicago, with a chorus of 2,200, a mixed chorus of 1,200, and an orchestra of 150. He died in Chicago at the age of 72 and was buried at Graceland Cemetery.

== Works ==
Balatka's compositions are few in number. Besides his addition of a climax to Chopin's "Funeral March," in place of its abrupt ending, he composed a grand aria for soprano with accompaniment, a piano quartet, a sonata, and several songs. He was the author of A Condensed History of Music (1888), A History of Orchestra Music in Chicago, and contributed musical articles regularly to the Chicago Daheim.
