= NASB =

NASB may refer to:

- National Academy of Sciences of Belarus
- National Association of Student Broadcasting, predecessor of the UK Student Radio Association
- Naval Air Station Brunswick
- New American Standard Bible
- Nigerian Accounting Standards Board, now the Financial Reporting Council of Nigeria
- Nord-Amerikanischer Sängerbund
- Netherlands Aviation Safety Board
- Nickelodeon All-Star Brawl
