= Henry Schoenefeld =

American conductor (1857–1936)

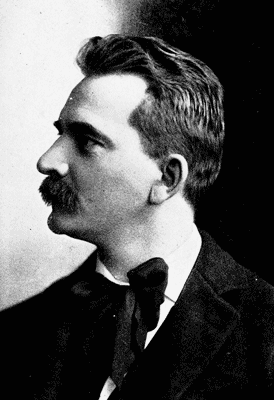
Henry Schoenefeld

Henry Schoenefeld, also spelled Henry Schoenfeld (October 4, 1857 in Milwaukee – August 4, 1936 in Los Angeles) was an American composer.

Schoenfeld studied in the German Empire at the Weimar Conservatory. He moved to Chicago in 1879, when he began conducting Germania Männerchor that year and a mixed choir there from 1891 to 1902. In 1904, he again became a choir master and conducted the Woman's Symphony Orchestra in Los Angeles.

His compositions included two operas, a Rural Symphony, a suite on Indian themes for strings, and two Indian legends, as well as numerous pieces for piano.

Schoenfeld taught at UCLA and many of his students, such as Roy Harris, went on to have successful careers. His son was the harpsichordist George Schoenefeld.
