= Anke Schäferkordt =

German businessperson (born 1962)

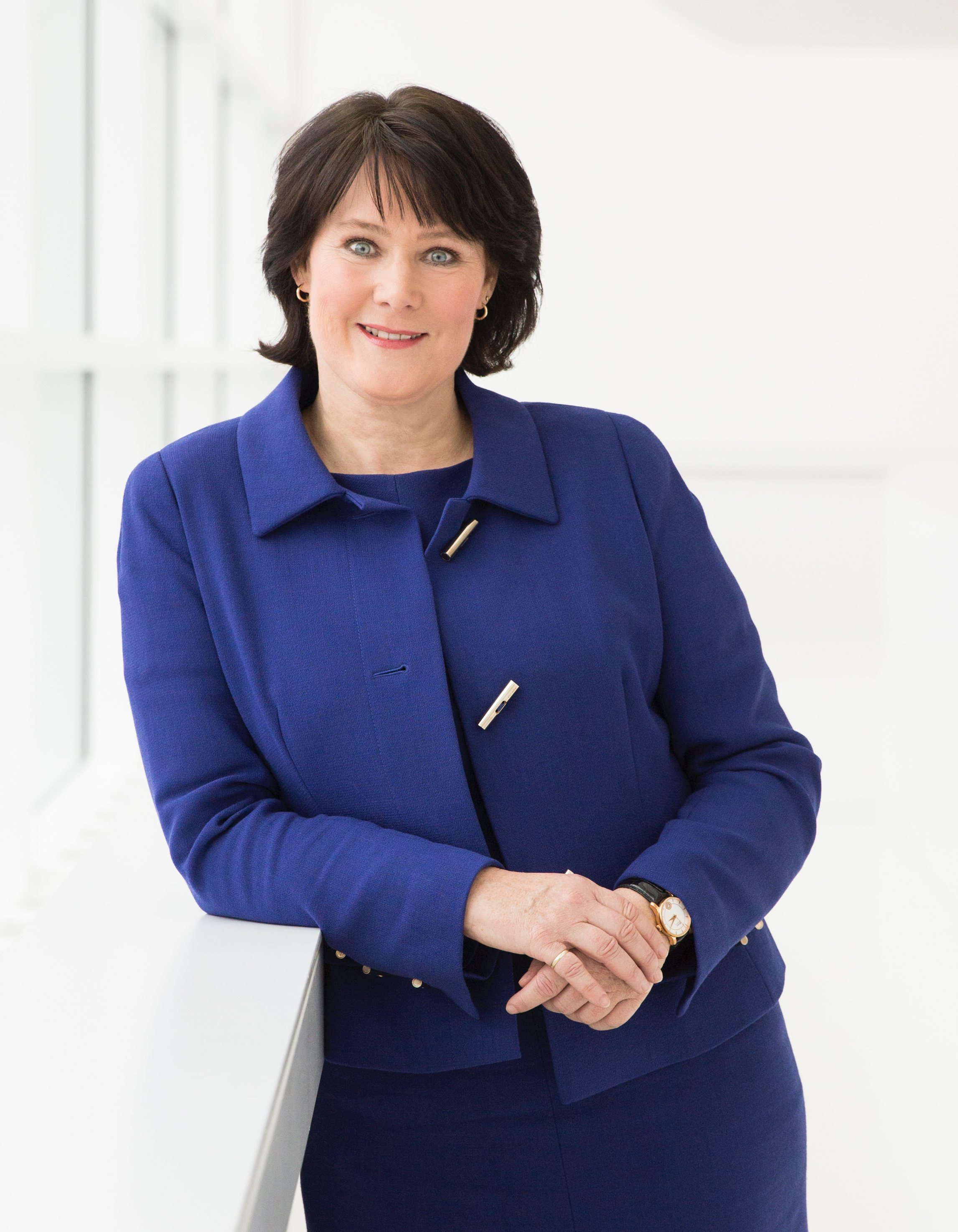
- Schäferkordt in 2017
- Born: 12 December 1962 (age 63); Lemgo
- Occupation: Businessperson

Anke Schäferkordt (born 12 December 1962) is a German businessperson who was CEO of the RTL Group from 2012 until 2017. She won the International Emmy Award for Directorate Award in 2013.

== Early life and education ==
Schäferkordt grew up in the village of Henstorf, studied in a primary school in Kalletal and graduated in 1982 in Marianne-Weber-Gymnasium, Lemgo. Then, she studied business administration at Paderborn University and graduated in 1988.

== Career ==
Schäferkordt began her professional career in the business management trainee program at Bertelsmann AG in Gütersloh. Schäferkordt was with Bertelsmann subsidiary RTL from 1991. For many years, she worked at the VOX television station, where she was the managing director from 1999 to 2005.

In February 2005, Schäferkordt became Gerhard Zeilers' vice at RTL Germany. On 1 September 2005 she took over as his successor the entire media group of RTL Alemanha; RTL Television, VOX, n-TV, RTL II, Super RTL, RTL NITRO, RTL Interactive, IP, infoNetwork e CBC. Schäferkordt was at the same time managing director of the RTL Television station.

In 2012, Schäferkordt became CEO of the international RTL Group in Luxembourg, but kept her jobs for another year in Germany. In the same year, she was inducted into the German Advertising Hall of Fame.

On 1 February 2013 Schäferkordt handed over the position of CEO of RTL Television (Germany) to the managing director of VOX, Frank Hoffmann. In the same year, she won the International Emmy Award for Directorate Award. In 2017, Schäferkordt left the office as CEO of RTL Group.

In 2023, several German state governments led by the center-right Christian Democratic Union (CDU) proposed Schäferkordt as a member of an expert group advising on a reform of country’s public broadcasting; however, she declined the appointment.

== Other activities ==
- BMW, Member of the Supervisory Board (since 2020)
- Wayfair, Member of the board of directors (since 2019)
- Serviceplan, Member of the Supervisory Board (since 2019)
- BASF, Member of the Supervisory Board (2010–2022)
- M6 Group, Member of the Supervisory Board (2015–2018)
- Software AG, Member of the Supervisory Board (2010–2015)

== Recognition ==
In 2007, Schäferkordt was named one of Europe's 25 top businesswomen in the Financial Times annual ranking.
