= Germania Männerchor =

The Germania Männerchor, later the Lincoln Club and the Germania Club, was a male choral cooperative society formed by German immigrants in Chicago. The group performed vocal music, music accompanied by an orchestra, and music for social dancing, later transforming to a private social club. It was one of the most popular singing groups in Chicago.

== History ==
The group was originally formed in 1865 by Otto Lob to perform songs while the body of Abraham Lincoln lay in state in Chicago before being buried in Springfield. When the group formally organized later that year as Germania Männerchor, Lob was elected as its first conductor. By 1868 the group had voted to make Hans Balatka, who had previously been a member and conductor of the Philharmonic Society, an honorary member. Lob and some members of Germania Mannerchor split and formed the Concordia music society. The two groups maintained a rivalry, producing a number of high quality productions of operas such as The Magic Flute (by Concordia) and Der Freischuetz and Stradella (by Germania Männerchor). Each of the choruses had over a hundred members. The group performed in locations ranging from the short-lived Crosby Opera House to open air productions.

The group was part of a widespread tradition of local ethnic music and social groups across the United States during the 19th Century with ensembles of the same name existing in Baltimore, Maryland, Washington, DC, New York, Saginaw, MI, and Evansville, Indiana. The Chicago-based Germania Männerchor participated in the 1867 Nord-Amerikanischer Sängerbund held in Indianapolis, performing the works of Franz Abt under the baton of Balatka.

In 1871, Balatka left to join the Liederkranz, and was replaced by Julius Fuchs. The Concordia chorus merged back with Germania Mannerchor in 1873. In 1875, they performed a concert with Theodore Thomas directing. Henry Schoenefeld became the conductor in 1879. Of the number of choral societies in Chicago that existed prior to 1871, only the Germania Mannerchor was still in existence as of 1893.

In 1889, the group built the Germania Club Building on Germania Place in the Near North Side of Chicago. It produced a catalog of the 500 books in its library and a 1903 Yearbook in German. The club purchased German related architectural items to furnish the club, including an 18 foot tall section of Manufacturer's Building from the World's Columbian Exposition which had been made by a German porcelain company and 18 inch tall wooden panels that measured up to 11 feet long decorated with intricate carvings of scenes from Wagner's operas that had originally been created for a Chicago mansion.

With the anti-German rhetoric that accompanied American entry into World War I, the group changed its name to the Lincoln Club in 1917. It became the Germania Club in 1928. The group evolved from a choral ensemble that collected books and material relating to the German experience in America, to an almost purely social club which developed a reputation as one of the leading private clubs of Chicago. The club disbanded in 1986.

== Notable members ==
Notable members have included:

- Fred A. Busse (circa 1905)
