= Hello Heavy =

Studio album by EZ Basic
- Released: 1 April 2010 (Hungary)
- Recorded: 2009–10
- Genre: Indie rock
- Length: 39:11
- Labels: Twelvetones, (Hungary)
- Producer: George Shilling

EZ Basic chronology
Hocus Focus (2007)	Hello Heavy (2010)	Memories of Spring (2012)

Professional ratings
Review scores
Source	Rating
EST	(7/10)
Magyar Narancs	(4/5)
Quart	

Hello Heavy is the second full-length studio album recorded by EZ Basic. The album was released in April 2010 by the Hungarian Twelvetones Records.

== Background and recording ==
In the summer of 2009, EZ Basic hired English producer George Shilling who previously produced the recording of bands like Primal Scream, Blur, Bernard Butler (ex-Suede), Soup Dragons, Coldcut, My Bloody Valentine, The Fall, etc.

== Track listing ==
1. "Sleeping In
2. "Motorik Erik
3. "May
4. "Layoffs Not Days Off
5. "Fingermonster
6. "Spy FM
7. "Pulse
8. "Bad Boyfriend
9. "Friends
10. "Going South

== Personnel ==
The following people contributed to Hello Heavy:

EZ Basic

- Árpád Szarvas - guitars, vocals, bass, keyboards, songwriting
- András Tóth - drums

Additional musicians and production

- Áron Nagybaczoni - keyboards
