= Citizens (band) =

American Christian rock band

- Origin: Seattle, Washington, United States
- Genres: Christian rock, indie, Christian alternative rock
- Years active: 2011–present
- Labels: BEC/Mars Hill, Gospel Song, Running Club
- Members: Zach Bolen; Brian Eichelberger; Adam Skatula; Dan Folgado; Connor Hedge
- Past members: Nathan Furtado; Tom McConnell; Nate Garvey; Jeremy Kelderman; Bryce Covert; Spencer Abbott
- Website: Official website

Citizens, formerly known as Citizens & Saints, are an American Christian rock band from Seattle, Washington.

== Background ==
Citizens & Saints were formerly based at Mars Hill Church, which was one of their record labels. Zach Bolen leads the band. Bolen resigned from Mars Hill in 2014, where he served as elder and worship leader.

After changing their name, the band released their second studio album, Join the Triumph, in November 2014. This album incorporated more electronic sounds and synthesizers can be heard on several of the tracks. The album is still in keeping with their fundamental indie/alternative rock sound.

== Music ==
The band released an EP called Already / Not Yet on May 8, 2012, which was done only on the Mars Hill label.

Their first full-length studio album under the band name Citizens & Saints was Citizens, released on March 12, 2013. This album was released on both the BEC Recordings and Mars Hill Records labels, and was produced by Brian Eichelberger.

Their second full-length studio album, Join the Triumph, was released on November 11, 2014, by BEC Recordings and was again produced by Eichelberger.

A third album, titled A Mirror Dimly, was released on September 16, 2016.

== Discography ==
=== Album ===
Year	Album	Peak chart positions	
Year	Album	Top Christian	Top Heatseekers
2013	Citizens: Released: March 12, 2013; Label: BEC/Mars Hill; Format: CD, Digital download	20	6
2014	Join the Triumph: Released: November 11, 2014; Label: BEC; Format: CD, Digital download, Vinyl	30	9
2016	A Mirror Dimly: Released: September 16, 2016; Label: Gospel Song Records; Format: CD, Digital download, Vinyl	13	8
2019	Fear: Released: May 3, 2019; Label: Gospel Song Records; Format: CD, Digital download, Vinyl		
2020	The Joy of Being (Phone Demos): Released: April 9, 2020; Label: Running Club Records; Format: CD, Digital download, Vinyl		
2020	The Joy of Being: Released: October 2, 2020; Label: Running Club Records; Format: CD, Digital download, Vinyl		
2023	i can't find the edges of you: Released: February 24, 2023; Label: Running Club Records; Format: Digital download, Vinyl		
2025	m us eum: Releases: October 9, 2025; Label: Anotherland; Format: Digital download, Streaming		

=== EP ===
Year	Album	Peak chart positions	
Year	Album	Top Christian	Top Heatseekers
2012	Already / Not Yet: Released: May 8, 2012; Label: BEC; Format: CD, digital download		
2013	Repeat the Sounding Joy: Released: November 25, 2013; Label: BEC; Format: CD, digital download		
2017	In Part: Released: August 11, 2017; Label: Gospel Song Records; Format: Digital download		
2019	Looking Up: Released: April 17, 2019; Label: Rainbow, Humble Beast; Format: Digital download		
2019	Waking Up to Never Die: Released: October 25, 2019; Label: Rainbow, Humble Beast; Format: Digital download		
2025	Living Is Proof: Released: April 25, 2025; Label: Anotherland; Format: Digital download		
