= Hellbender Vinyl =

US vinyl record manufacturing company

Hellbender Vinyl is a vinyl record manufacturing company with locations in Pittsburgh and Philadelphia, Pennsylvania. It is notable as the only record pressing plant currently operating in Western Pennsylvania, the largest record manufacturer in Pennsylvania, and also one of the largest record manufacturers in the United States.

== Company history ==
Hellbender Vinyl was founded by Misra Records manager Jeff Betten and Paperhaus band member Matt Dowling. Betten cited the vinyl revival of the 2010s as the reason that the two men felt Hellbender Vinyl would be a necessary addition to the music industry.

In 2025, Hellbender Vinyl purchased Softwax Record Pressing out of bankruptcy, making it the largest vinyl record plant in Pennsylvania.

The company is located in the Lawrenceville neighborhood of Pittsburgh and in the Lawncrest neighborhood of Philadelphia. To date, Hellbender Vinyl has pressed records for clients such as Brian Wilson, Wiz Khalifa, Victoria Monét, Urban Outfitters, Sixpence None the Richer, Castle Rat, DFTBA Records, Chad Smith, MCG Jazz, PepsiCo, Get Hip Records, Guster, Cello Fury, Wheatus, Jim Donovan, Donora, Camping in Alaska, Beedie, Dizzy Reed, Raymond Watts, Cowgirl Clue, Zao, Buffalo Rose, Sparta, Beauty Pill, Ollabelle, Brittain Ashford, The Juliana Theory, Caroline Rose, and more.

In 2025 and 2026, Hellbender Vinyl was announced as a winner of the "Excellence in Customer Service Awards" by Business Intelligence Group.

In 2026, Hellbender Vinyl won the Quality Business Award for a "proven track record of exceptional service quality" and a "commitment to maintaining highest industry standards".

== Innovations, notable projects ==
In May 2025, Hellbender Vinyl made news when it was announced that the company had pressed a 7-inch record for The Ataris containing the ashes of singer Kristopher Roe's father, William.

Hellbender Vinyl participated in the Super Bowl LIX ad campaign by Mountain Dew Baja Blast, for which it pressed a vinyl record of the song "Kiss from a Lime" by Seal featured in the commercial.

Hellbender Vinyl collaborated with Pereira O'Dell in October 2024 to create a pancake-shaped record as part of the "Working for the Weekday" ad campaign for IHOP featuring Loverboy.

Hellbender Vinyl is also notable for its collaboration with Munnycat that resulted in the world's first "3D vinyl record" - in which the record acts as 3D glasses for the album cover’s stereoscopic artwork.

== Technology ==
Hellbender Vinyl uses LiteTone and WarmTone vinyl presses engineered by Viryl Technologies as well as a Hamilton M-231 and a SMT Model 1500. As a result, the company can produce several thousand records per day.

== See also ==
- Record press
- Production of phonograph records
