= Join the Triumph =

Studio album by Citizens & Saints
- Released: November 11, 2014
- Genre: Contemporary Christian music, worship
- Length: 35:57
- Label: BEC
- Producer: Brian Eichelberger

Citizens & Saints chronology
Citizens (2013)	Join the Triumph (2014)	A Mirror Dimly (2016)

Join the Triumph is the second studio album by Citizens & Saints, after their previous album Citizens was released when they were originally named Citizens. The album came out on November 11, 2014, on BEC Recordings.

== Reception ==
Professional ratings
Review scores
Source	Rating
CCM Magazine	4/5 stars
Christian Review Magazine	3.5/5 stars
Cross Rhythms	9/10 squares
Jesusfreakhideout.com	4/5 stars 3.5/5 stars
New Release Tuesday	4.5/5 stars

From CCM Magazine, Andy Argyrakis opines "though the group's overtly worshipful and oftentimes redemptive lyrics are as much a focal point as members' commendable creativity." From Cross Rhythms, Matt McChlery references "The recording is predominantly a collection of soaring anthems although there are moments of stillness and quiet that creates an effective ebb and flow to the album... Drawing on a variety of genres and musical styles and using a myriad of amazing synth and keyboard effects, Citizens & Saints have created a top quality project." From Jesus Freak Hideout, Ryan Barbee suggests "Join the Triumph is a great collection of songs to be used within the context of corporate church gatherings, but not much more than that." From New Release Tuesday, Caitlin Lassiter expresses "Join The Triumph seems to be a perfect name for this collection of songs, containing themes of grace, redemption and the greatness of our God running through every track." From Christian Review Magazine, Leah St. John recognizes, "it's a bit of a mixed bag."

== Track listing ==
No.	Title	Length
1.	"The Strife Is Over"	3:28
2.	"There Is a Fountain"	3:09
3.	"You Brought Me Back to Life"	3:46
4.	"The Mighty Hand of God"	3:03
5.	"You Have Searched Me"	3:57
6.	"Be Thou My Vision"	3:24
7.	"Oh! Great Is Our God"	3:01
8.	"The Gospel"	2:56
9.	"Greatly to Be Praised"	3:24
10.	"Father You Are All We Need"	5:29
11.	"Before the Throne" (Digital Bonus Track)	3:48
12.	"Made Alive (Cesar P Remix)" (Amazon Digital Bonus Track)	3:18
Total length:		35:57

== Charts ==
Chart (2014)	Peak position
US Top Christian Albums (Billboard)	30
US Heatseekers Albums (Billboard)	9
