= Cleveland Maennerchor =

The Cleveland Maennerchor is a Maennerchor organization in Cleveland, Ohio. It was founded in 1967 from the consolidation of the Heights Maennerchor (aka the Heights Male Chorus) and the Schwaebischer Saengerbund. The Heights Maennerchor was formed in 1873 and originally led by Reinhold Henninges.
