= Jung von Matt =

Advertising agency headquartered in Hamburg, Germany

- JvM Logo
- Type: Public company
- Industry: Business Services
- Founded: 1991
- Headquarters: Hamburg, Germany
- Key people: Dr. Peter Figge, Jean-Remy von Matt, Ulrich Pallas
- Products: Advertising
- Revenue: 79,43 million Euro (2013)
- Number of employees: 788
- Website: www.jvm.com

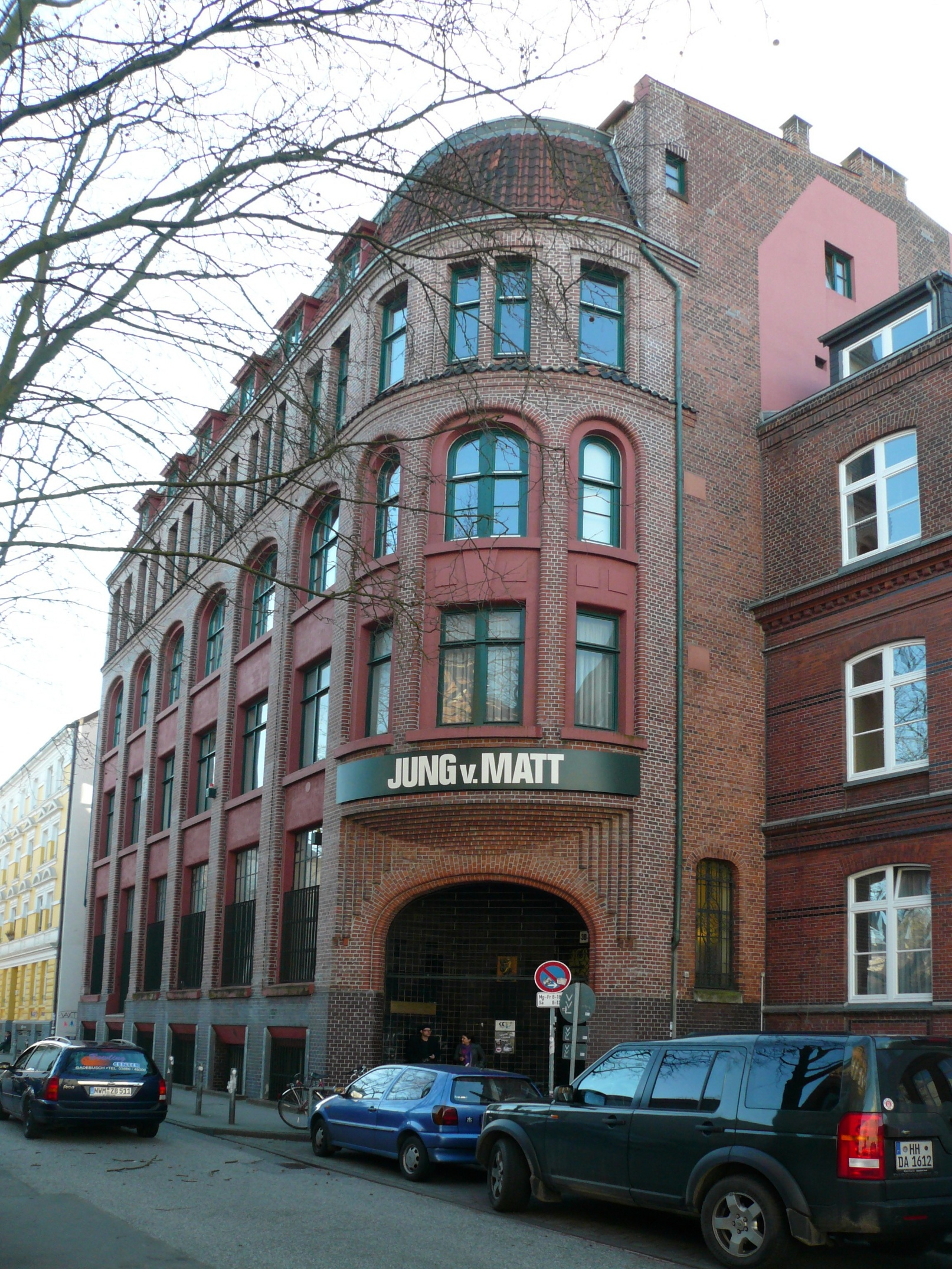
Headquarters in Hamburg

Jung von Matt (JvM) is an advertising agency headquartered in Hamburg, Germany, with 24 affiliates in Germany, Austria, Switzerland, the United States, South Korea, China, Poland and the Czech Republic. Jung von Matt is the second biggest owner-run German advertising agency, behind Serviceplan.

== Key personnel ==
Jung von Matt was founded in 1991 by Holger Jung and Jean-Remy von Matt in Hamburg. Peter Figge, Jean-Remy von Matt, Larissa Pohl, Thomas Strerath and Götz Ulmer are co-CEOs.

== Awards ==
Between 2008 and 2012, the so-called Kreativ-Index of the German Manager magazine ranked Jung von Matt as the most creative German advertising agency. In 2012, JvM won four Golden Trophies at the European Design & Advertising Art Directors Club of Europe Awards in Barcelona. In the same year Jung von Matt was ranked No. 3 of Most Effective Independent Agency Offices in the worldwide Effie Effectiveness Index. In 2015 the agency won a total of eight trophies at the AME Award in New York (Advertising & Marketing Effectiveness). Among them was the Grand Trophy for the "Trojan Mailing." In 2018, Jung von Matt earned the title Agency of the Year at the Lovie Awards, a prestigious pan-European honor for online excellence.

== Controversies ==
The customer of this advertisement EDEKA was officially reprimanded by the German Advertising Standards Authority (Deutscher Werberat) for breaching advertising standards.
