= Pereira O'Dell =

American advertising agency

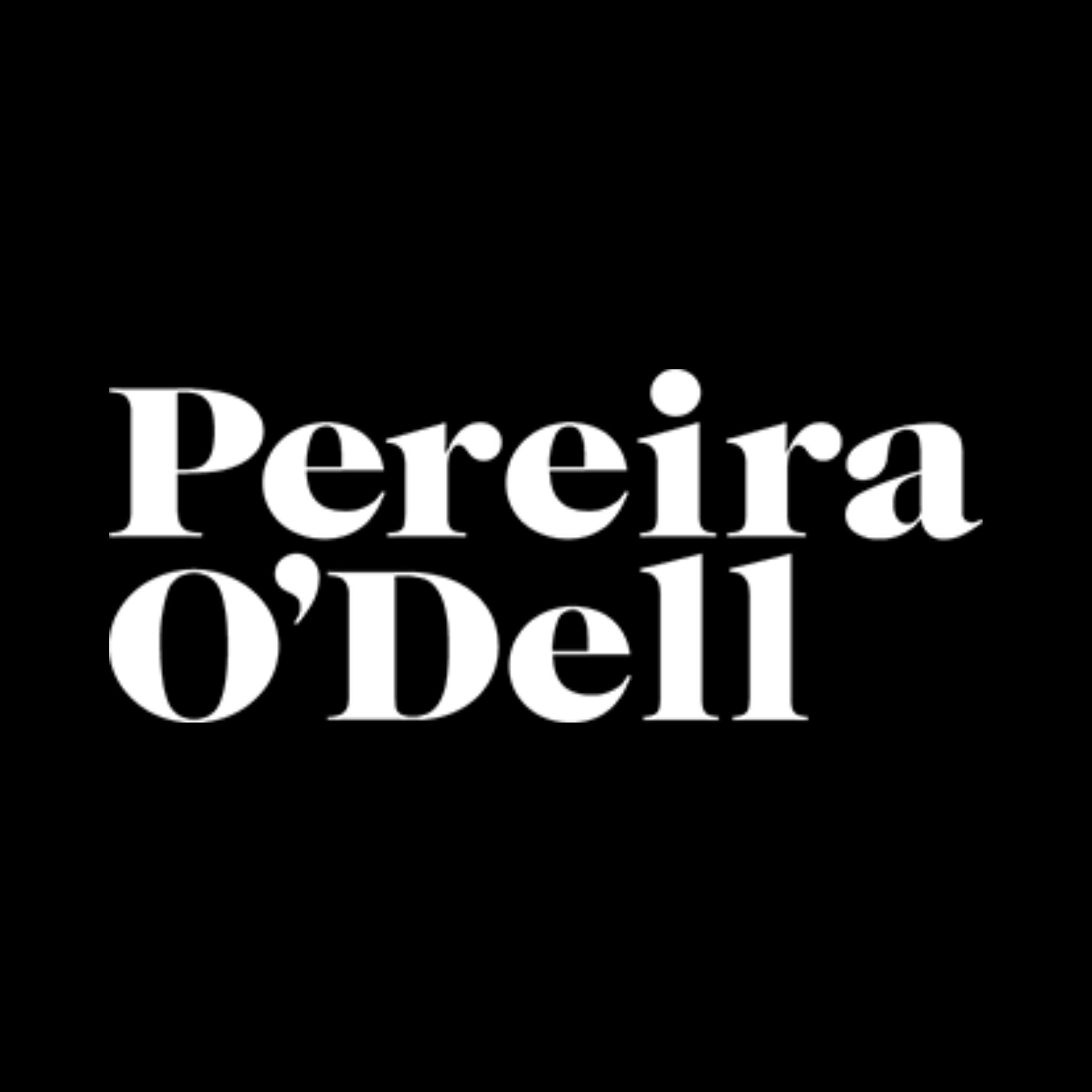
- Logo
- Company type: Private
- Industry: Advertising
- Founded: 2008
- Founders: Andrew O'Dell, PJ Pereira
- Headquarters: San Francisco, United States
- Area served: Worldwide
- Key people: Andrew O'Dell (CEO), PJ Pereira (CCO)
- Number of employees: 85 (2010)
- Parent: Serviceplan
- Website: www.pereiraodell.com

Pereira O'Dell is an American advertising agency founded in 2008 by Andrew O'Dell and PJ Pereira. Pereira O'Dell is headquartered in San Francisco, California, and operates within Serviceplan Group, a network of independent agencies. In 2020, Serviceplan bought Pereira O'Dell through its American subsidiary arm, Serviceplan Americas. Pereira O'Dell is known for its innovative and creative advertising campaigns across various media platforms. The agency has won awards, including the Cannes Lions, the Clio Awards, and the Webby Awards. Pereira O'Dell's portfolio includes work for Intel, MINI, Adobe, Chex and Coca-Cola.

== Notable work ==
- Fanta, "Play It Better" (2016)
- Manscaped, "The Boys"
- Coca-Cola, "True Friendship"
- Chex, "Full of Possibilities"

== Awards ==
- Cannes Lions
- Webby Awards
- Effie Awards
