= Germania Club Building =

- U.S. National Register of Historic Places
- Chicago Landmark
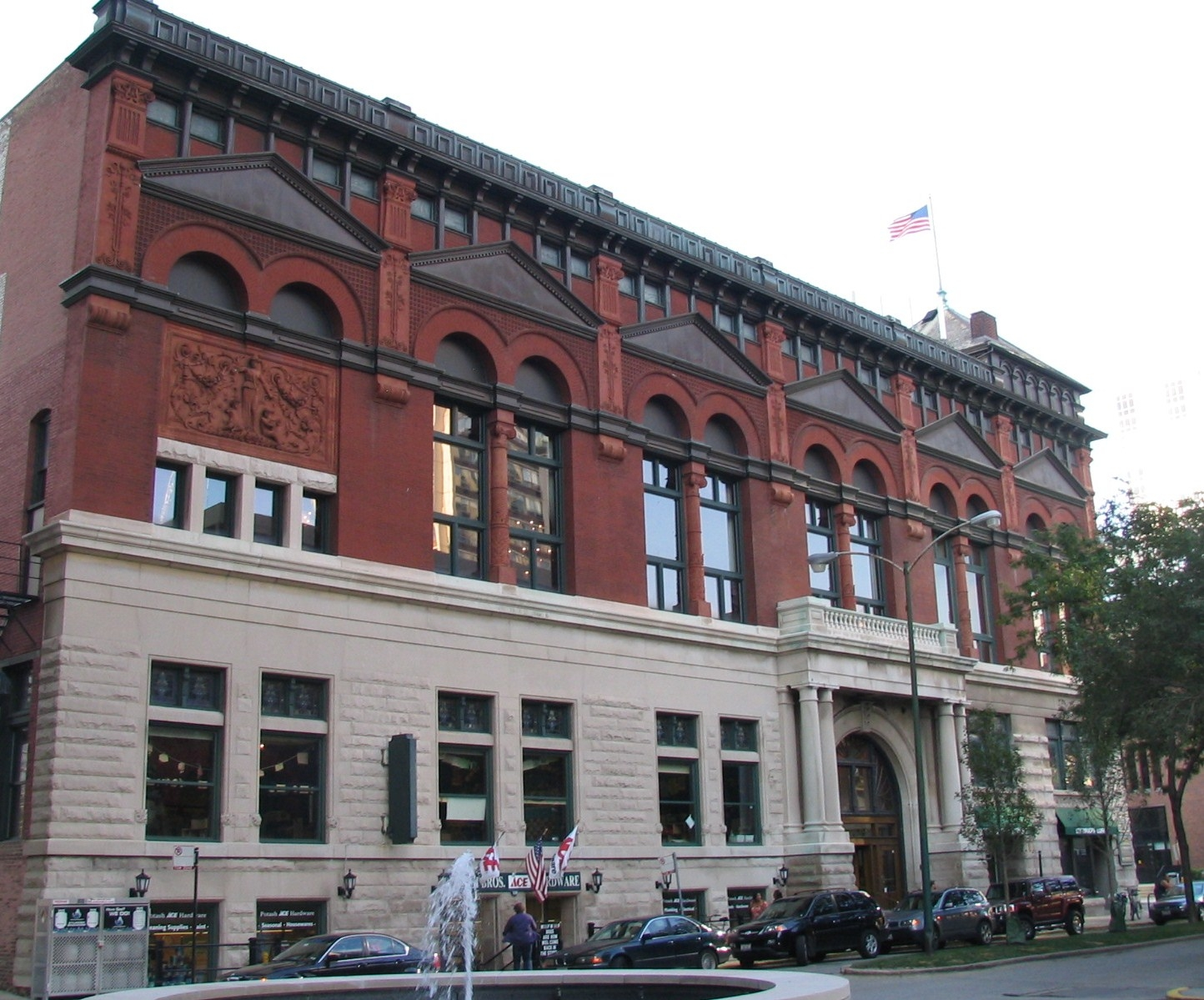

- Location within Chicago metropolitan area Location within Illinois Location within the United States
- Location: 108 W. Germania Pl. Chicago, Illinois
- Coordinates: 41°54′38″N 87°37′57″W
- Area: less than one acre
- Built: 1889
- Architect: Fiedler, August
- NRHP reference No.: 76000692

Significant dates
- Added to NRHP: October 22, 1976
- Designated CHICL: January 13, 2011

The Germania Club Building, located at 108 W. Germania Place in the Near North Side community area of Chicago, Illinois, is the historic headquarters of the Germania Club, the oldest German-American organization in the city. The Germania Club was founded in 1865 as the Germania Männerchor, which formed to sing at Abraham Lincoln's funeral. The club built the Germania Club Building in 1889; it was designed by August Fiedler in an eclectic style featuring neoclassical and German Renaissance influences. The five-story building has a two-story limestone base with a portico and arched doorway on the south end. The upper stories feature arched windows capped by pediments and a pilaster supporting the cornice atop the building. The building includes a grand ballroom, banquet room, and restaurant and bar. The club played an important role in Chicago's German-American community, once the largest ethnic community in Chicago.

== History ==
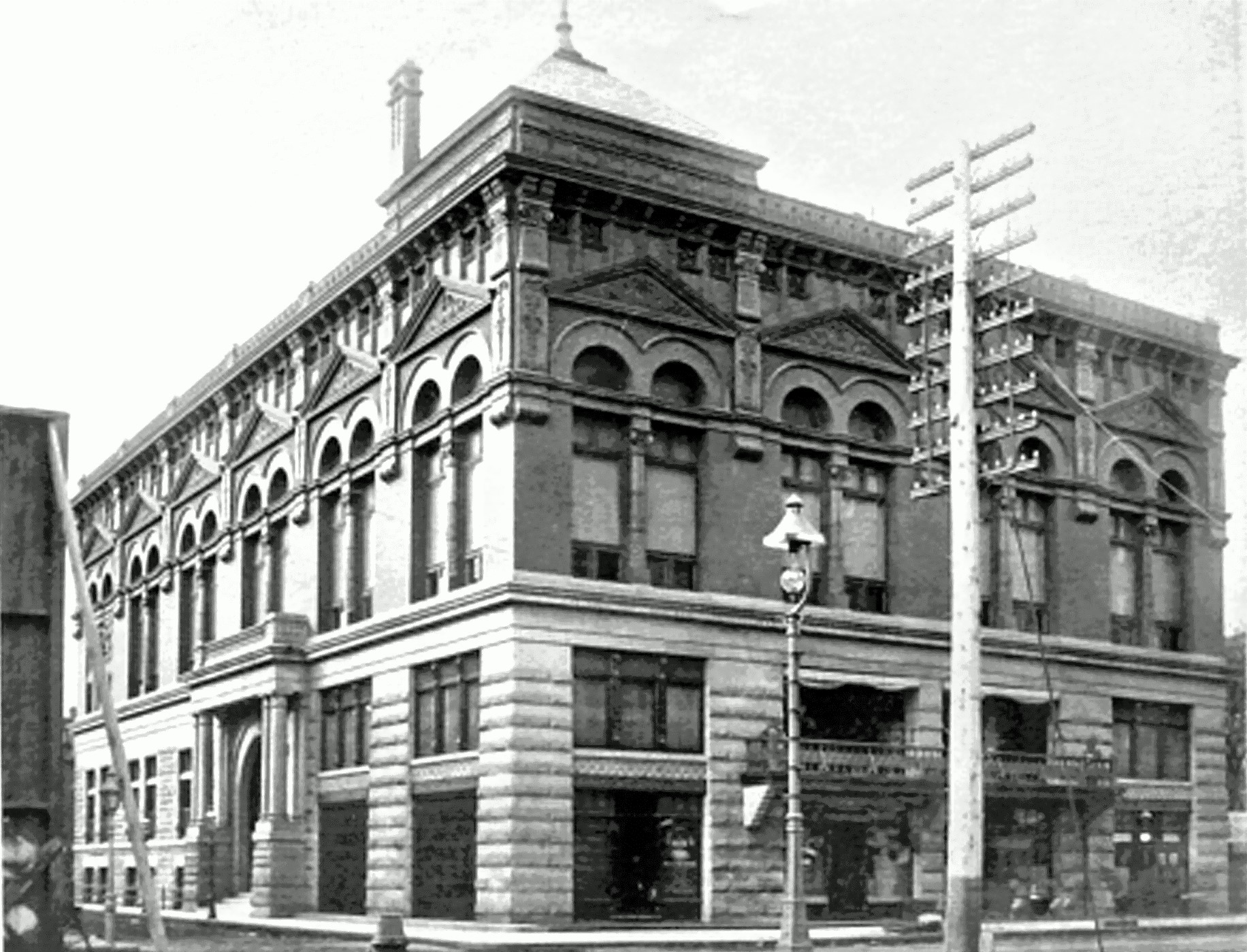
Building circa 1893

The Germania Club Building was added to the National Register of Historic Places on October 22, 1976. It was designated as a Chicago Landmark on January 13, 2011.
