= Seasons in the Underground =

Studio album by The Moog
- Released: 10 April 2012 (United States)
- Recorded: early 2012
- Genre: Indie rock
- Length: 35:43
- Labels: MuSick, United States
- Producer: Ken Scott

The Moog chronology
Razzmatazz Orfeum (2009)	Seasons in the Underground (2012)

Professional ratings
Review scores
Source	Rating
PopMatters	(6/10)
L.A. Record	
Blog Critics	
Blurt	
Allmusic	

Seasons in the Underground is the third studio album recorded by The Moog. The album was recorded at the London Bridge Studio in Seattle, Washington, and was mixed at the Total Access Recording in Redondo Beach, California, except tracks 1, 3, 7, 10 at the Bay 7 Studios in Los Angeles, California. The album was produced by Ken Scott (the producer of David Bowie), except tracks 1, 3, 7, 10 by Jun Murakawa.

== Background and recording ==
On 15 January 2013, Ádám Bajor (former guitarist of The Moog) claimed that they had everything for the recording of the Seasons in the Underground except the songs ready. “We recorded ten new songs among which 5 songs were completed only at the studio. It was a survival period for the band. We were definitely in the middle of a crisis. Ken Scott, who is an excellent producer, was waiting for us with complete plans. We didn't have any plans we weren't prepared for the recording. When in a studio you are expected to have 100 versions for a guitar solo and the task of the producer is to select the right one, but we didn't have. You can feel our uncertainty on this record.”

== Track listing ==
All lyrics are written by Tamás Szabó.

No.	Title	Music	Producer(s)	Length
1.	"Seasons Change In The Underground"	Ádám Bajor, Gergő Dorozsmai, Gergő György, Csaba Szabó, Tamás Szabó	Jun Murakawa	3:21
2.	"We Walk In Fast"	Ádám Bajor, Gergő Dorozsmai, Gergő György, Csaba Szabó, Tamás Szabó	Ken Scott	3:02
3.	"I Wanna Take You to Paris"	Gergő Dorozsmai, Gergő György, Csaba Szabó, Tamás Szabó	Jun Murakawa	3:09
4.	"Highway"	Gergő Dorozsmai	Ken Scott	2:58
5.	"Call Me Up"	Tamás Szabó	Ken Scott	3:14
6.	"Run"	Ádám Bajor, Gergő Dorozsmai, Gergő György, Csaba Szabó, Tamás Szabó	Ken Scott	3:06
7.	"I Can't Wait"	Evan Foster, Tamás Szabó	Jun Murakawa	2:59
8.	"No Time To Turn Around"	Ádám Bajor, Gergő Dorozsmai, Gergő György, Csaba Szabó, Tamás Szabó	Ken Scott	2:22
9.	"We Walk in Slow"	Gergő Dorozsmai, Csaba Szabó, Tamás Szabó	Ken Scott	3:36
10.	"March Of The Unholy Truth"	Ádám Bajor, Gergő Dorozsmai, Gergő György, Csaba Szabó, Tamás Szabó	Jun Murakawa	4:14
11.	"Hey Little Bird"	Ádám Bajor, Gergő Dorozsmai, Gergő György, Csaba Szabó, Tamás Szabó	Ken Scott	3:42
