= EZ Basic =

Hungarian musical group

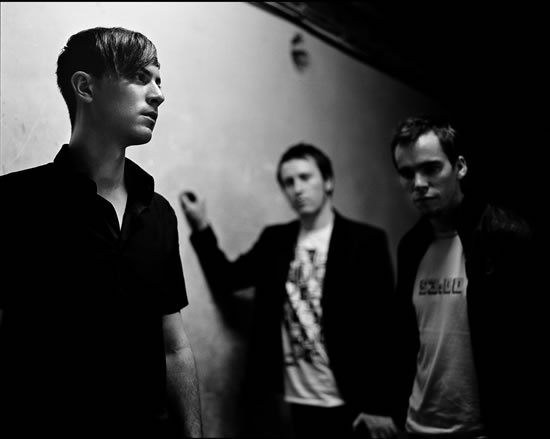

Background information
- Origin: Budapest, Hungary
- Genres: Indie pop, Psychedelic pop
- Years active: 2004-
- Labels: Twelvetones; EMI Records
- Members: Árpád Szarvas
- Website: Official Facebook webpage

EZ Basic is a guitar-pop, indie-rock project based in Budapest, Hungary formed in 2004. It started out as an experimental bedroom project in the early 00s and is noted for being one of the most eclectic bands of the Budapest indie music scene.

== History ==
=== Formation ===
EZ Basic were formed by Árpád Szarvas and Dénes Pesztalics. Their primary aim was to mix electronic and instrumental music but it was indie pop, post-punk and American girlie pop melodies from the 1960s that left their marks on EZ Basic's sound. On one hand, the name EZ Basic refers to early 1980s computers/electronics, on the other hand, to DIY punk ethics: “easy basic” as “learn three chords and form a band”.

Their early home demos recorded between 1999-2003 reflected an experimental approach to music making, bringing Primal Scream, Suicide, Broadcast, Sonic Youth, The Jesus & Mary Chain, New Order, early shoegaze bands and electronic beats from the mid-1990s to mind. In the same year they began a series of gigs in Budapest, but the 2-piece had soon found themselves playing packed gigs outside Budapest as well.

It was not until 2005 when András Tóth (former drummer of the Hungarian indie band Supersonic) joined EZ Basic on drums that their sound has moved into a more pop-orientated sound: previously backed by a drum machine and weird noises, the trio had become a powerful live band sometimes riding the waves of wall of sound and delivering delicate but cynical pop melodies. In the same year EZ Basic was on the bill at Sziget Festival (one of Europe’s biggest festivals), at Alan McGee's Death Disco and also played in Germany, Poland and Slovakia.

=== Hocus Focus ===
EZ Basic's debut album entitled Hocus Focus was recorded in only six days between 23–25 July and 3–5 September in 2007 in Budapest. They released it in November 2007 as un unsigned band. The album contains the song Nice1 which could be found in their debut EP EZ To Say. EZ Basic shot their first music video for the song Nice1. This song brought success for the band and could lay the foundations for being one of the leading members of the Hungarian indie music scene.

=== Hello Heavy ===
During the summer of 2009, EZ Basic started working with English producer George Shilling who previously worked with bands such as Primal Scream, Blur, Bernard Butler (ex-Suede), Soup Dragons, Coldcut, My Bloody Valentine, and The Fall. In April 2010 the Hungarian Twelvetones Records released EZ Basic's second full-length studio album, Hello Heavy. After the album's release the band supported Placebo in Budapest Sports Arena, and later represented Hungary at the Eurosonic Festival in Groningen, Netherlands in 2011.

=== Memories of Spring ===
EZ Basic released a new EP entitled Memories of Spring in April 2012. EZ Basic shot the video for the song Sometimes I Can't to promote their new EP. The video was directed by Dezső Gyarmati while the cinematographer was Ákos Nyoszoli.

=== Dead End Darling ===
In 2014 EZ Basic started recording their 3rd album called Dead End Darling, which was released on November 10, 2015. The album features previously released singles Unnatural and Whatcha Gonna Do With Your Life?, and contains 12 songs in total.

=== Sissyfuzz ===
The band released their 4th album Sissyfuzz on November 21, 2017. The neopsychedelic rock influenced album contains nine songs.

=== Resonance ===
EZ Basic's 5th album arrived in October, 2021. Inspired by German writer/sociologist, Hartmut Rosa’s concept of “resonance” (and our strained relationship with accelerated modern society), Resonance marks the return to working with British producer, George Shilling, who produced and mastered the album.

=== Nocturner ===
After the critically acclaimed Resonance, EZ Basic returned with a new album in April 2024 entitled Nocturner. Just like its predecessors, the album was recorded by Árpád Szarvas in its entirety, and it features guest musicians, such as Dániel Sajó (Fran Palermo) on trumpet, Imre Poniklo (Amber Smith (band)) on backing vocals, and Jehan Paumero (Psycho Mutants) on accordion.

== Band members ==
Current line-up

- Árpád Szarvas – lead vocals, guitars, keyboards, programming (2004–)

Former members

- András Tóth - drums (2005-2013)
- Áron Nagybaczoni - synths, piano, vocals (2009-2017)
- Dénes Pesztalics – bass guitar (2004–2017)

== Discography ==
EZ Basic discography
- Studio albums: 3
- Extended plays: 2
- Music videos: 4

Albums

- EZ To Say EP (2007)
- Hocus Focus (2007)
- Hello Heavy (2010)
- Memories of Spring EP (2012)
- Dead End Darling (2015)
- Sissyfuzz (2017)
- Resonance (2021)
- Nocturner (2024)

Singles

- New Lines (2013)
- Unnatural (2014)
- Whatcha Gonna Do With Your Life? (2015)
- Bruise Boy (2016)
- Right Time (2017)
- Stay In (2021)
- Lost Shores (2023)

== Music videos ==
Year	Title	Director
2010	Nice1	Péter Farkas
2010	May	Dávid Vígh
2011	Motorik Erik	Róbert Borbás & Judit Kurth
2012	Sometimes I Can't	Dezső Gyarmati & Ákos Nyoszoli
2015	Whatcha Gonna Do With Your Life?	László Szarvas
2016	Go	Alexandra Molnár Rusek
2018	Bronco	Alexandra Molnár Rusek
2019	Minxx	Dávid Klág, Éva Szombat
2022	Stay In	Dániel Gaál

== See also ==
- Amber Smith
- Árpád Szarvas
- Budapest indie music scene
- The Moog
