= The Moog =

Hungarian indie rock band

- Origin: Budapest, Hungary
- Genre: Indie rock
- Years active: 2004–2016, 2022–present
- Labels: MuSick Recordings, United States
- Past members: Tamás Szabó; Gergő Dorozsmai; Gergő György; Csaba Szabó; Ádám Bajor
- Website: moog.hu

The Moog are a Hungarian indie rock band based in Budapest, Hungary formed in 2004. The group is noted for being the first in the region to be signed to an American record label. The band consists of members Tamás Szabó (vocals, keyboard), Gergő Dorozsmai (drums, percussion), Ádám Bajor (guitar), Gergő (a.k.a. Miguel) György (guitar) and Csaba Szabó (bass guitar). The Moog have been compared to The Strokes and The Hives and dubbed "Hungary's hottest new export".

== History ==
=== Formation ===
Gergő Dorozsmai, Ádi Bajor and Tamás Szabó were friends and classmates who spent their early years performing covers of Nirvana, Led Zeppelin and Placebo as well writing original compositions. In 2004, the three decided to take their material and become a serious band. After meeting Csabi Szabó at a bar, they group discovered their mutual tastes in music and adopted him into the band. Szabó had not developed any skill with bass guitar, but quickly learned from being enthused by the band. Miguel György, an established Hungarian guitarist, was offered a position and joined out of interest.

The name is a tribute to a bar the group attended when they were 18 years of age. Moog Music allowed use of the name for the band on the condition that they precede it with "The". Keyboardist and singer Tonyo Szabo also noted that "they gave us a synthesizer, so we use it now."

=== Sold for Tomorrow ===
The band's debut album, Sold for Tomorrow was recorded in Budapest, Hungary at Tom-Tom Studios. It was mixed by Jack Endino (renowned for his work on Nirvana's Bleach) at Electrokitty in Seattle and mastered in Los Angeles with Dave Schultz. The album is said to be inspired by sixties rock and roll bands The Beatles, The Beach Boys as well as late seventies punk rock acts Ramones and Blondie. Sold for Tomorrow was released on April 10, 2007. The accompanying single was "I Like You". The single was followed by songs such as "Everybody Wants" and "Survive". In addition, the song "I Like You" was played on the American TV series ER and on MtvU. In 2007 The Moog played for the first time in the United States in San Francisco, Portland, Seattle, Bellingham, Hollywood and Las Vegas. The Moog was nominated for Best Hungarian Act at the MTV Europe Music Awards 2007. In 2008 they returned to the United States to play some shows with The Reverse. In the same year they played on their first European tour starting in Cologne, then in Potsdam, Berlin, London, and Madrid.

=== Razzmatazz Orfeum ===
The band's second album Razzmatazz Orfeum (2009) was recorded in Seattle with producer Geoff Ott (Pearl Jam, Queens of the Stone Age, Mark Lanegan). The album's first single "You Raised A Vampire" was released on colored vinyl 7" with artwork by Gris Grimly. The 7" also includes a B-side cover (recorded in Budapest, Citysound studio, recording engineer Marton Palinkas, mixed and mastered in Seattle by Geoff Ott) of the Bauhaus song The Passion of Lovers, featuring Bauhaus and Love & Rockets bassist/vocalist David J, who became a fan of The Moog after seeing them perform in Los Angeles in 2008. The video for "You Raised A Vampire" was shot in Budapest.

The Moog presented their album at the Merlin Theatre in Budapest, Hungary. In 2009 two songs from Razzmatazz Orfeum were selected for Greek. In addition, the band's song "Joyclad Armies" was chosen for NBA 2K10. The second single from Razzmatazz Orfeum, "When I See You" and its video, by director Anthony Garth (who shot the White Stripes' clips for "We Are Going to Be Friends" and "Hotel Yorba") received a great amount of airplay in all major US music video outlets, including FUSE and MTV (a favorite at Subterranean). In April 2010 The Moog returned to the US with shows in San Diego, San Francisco, Los Angeles, Scottsdale, Austin and Atlanta.

=== Seasons in the Underground ===
In the spring of 2012, The Moog released their third studio album entitled Seasons in the Underground. The album was produced by Ken Scott in Seattle.

On February 25, 2012, The Moog presented their third record to the Hungarian fans (with fellow band Amber Smith) at the Akvárium klub in Budapest, Hungary. In 2012 The Moog headed for the United States to play at the SXSW, then at The Mix, San Antonio, Texas with David Lane. In May 2012, The Moog played at the Viper Room in West Hollywood, California. In September 2012, The Moog played at the Gallo Center for the Arts in Modesto, California, at the Boulder Theater in Boulder, Colorado, and at the Pikes Peak Center in Colorado Springs, Colorado with The B-52s.

On July 13, 2012, Ádám Bajor announced his departure from the band on his Facebook profile. The reasons have not been revealed by either party since then. Bajor has since concentrated on his other band Haunebu.

In November 2012, The Moog released their second video, "I Wanna Take You To Paris", featuring actor Robert Romanus from the album Seasons in the Underground. The video was directed by Tamás Szabó and Art Bourasseau, photographed by Vince Sweeney and edited by Michael Kuge.

In November the band announced some new concert dates on their Facebook profile, including Lowbrow Palace in El Paso, Texas, the Boeshakers in San Angelo, Texas, the ND in Austin, Texas and the Shoeshine Charley's Big Top Lounge in Houston, Texas. On November 27, 2012, the band returned to the East Coast. hitting Harrisburg, Pennsylvania at the Harrisburg Midtown Arts Center, on November 28 in New York City at the Pianos, and on November 29 in Boston.

On December 13, 2012, The Moog announced on their Facebook profile that they were working on a new song in the U.S. for a 2013 release.

In January 2013, The Moog returned to the United States to play on February 8 at the Grove of Anaheim in Anaheim, California and on February 9 at the Majestic Ventura Theatre in Ventura, California with the B-52s.

On December 11, 2014, the Moog posted a short note that on their Facebook page their upcoming single would be mixed by Mark Needham.

The band temporarily split in 2016.

In 2022, the band returned for a live show for Live at Artemovszk 38 at the A38 Vessel in Budapest, Hungary.

== Side projects ==
=== Bastiaan ===
The Moog singer Tamás Szabó formed Bastiaan with former Jacked singer Tamás Mórocz (guitars and vocals), Márton Hó (bass), and Michael Zwecker (drums from The Poster Boy). They are mixing various strands of pop, rock and synthetised sounds into listenable tunes. On February 22, 2012, they released their first EP entitled Kissing A Stranger, which is available on Bandcamp for free download. The EP includes four songs (World Doesn't Answer, Another Ulysses, New Dawn, and Hidden Beach).

=== Nibiru ===
Tamás Szabó formed Nibiru with Márk Lechner from Polar Dear. Their first EP was released on May 13, 2013, containing three songs: I'm In Love, Yes, and You Do The Same.

=== Gustave Tiger ===
In 2013 Gergő Dorozsmai and Csaba Szabó formed Gustave Tiger. They recruited Péter Mezősi as the drummer for the band, while Dorozsmai sings and Szabó plays the bass. Their first album, Mitanni Mares, was released on September 24, 2013, including seven songs which were recorded at the Tom-tom studios in Budapest, Hungary. The lyrics were written by Dorozsmai and Szabó. For the song Countess Bathory the band hired Erika Szurcsik as a singer. The band made the album available for free download on their bandcamp site.

== Band members ==
Current line-up

- Tamás Szabó – lead vocals, keyboards (2004–2016, 2022–present)
- Gergő György – guitar (2006–2016, 2022–present)
- Csaba Szabó – bass guitar (2004–2016, 2022–present)
- Gergő Dorozsmai – drums (2004–2016, 2022–present)

Former members

- Norbert Ladányi – guitar (2004–2006)
- Ádám Bajor – guitar (2004–2012)

== Discography ==
The Moog discography
- Studio albums: 4
- Singles: 1
- Music videos: 6

Albums

- Sold for Tomorrow (2007)
- Razzmatazz Orfeum (2009)
- Seasons in the Underground (2012)
- The Moog EP (2016)

Singles

- You Raised The Vampire (2009)

== Music videos ==
As of April 22, 2017

Year	Title	Views	Channel	Director
May 31, 2007	"I Like You"	420,642	TheMoogChannel	Dávid Vígh
January 18, 2008	Everybody Wants	186,715	TheMoogChannel	Áron Veszejes
March 13, 2009	You Raised The Vampire	155,261	TheMoogChannel	Áron Veszejes
October 1, 2009	When I See You	28,968	TheMoogChannel	Anthony Garth
February 24, 2012	Seasons Change in the Underground	31,219	TheMoogChannel	Áron Szabó
November 16, 2012	I Wanna Take you to Paris	24,146	TheMoogChannel	Tamás Szabó and Art Bourasseu
May 5, 2014	Unbound	54,194	TheMoogChannel	Dezső Gyarmati
April 11, 2016	Northern Lights	6,191	TheMoogChannel	Amego Film

== See also ==
- Budapest indie music scene
- Tamás Szabó
- Amber Smith
- EZ Basic
