= Citizens (album) =

Studio album by Citizens
- Released: March 12, 2013
- Recorded: 2011–2013
- Genres: Modern hymn; Christian rock; indie rock
- Length: 48:42
- Labels: BEC; Mars Hill (Note: The album was reissued in 2016 by Gospel Song Records, an imprint of Tooth & Nail Records.)
- Producer: Brian Eichelberger

Citizens chronology
Already / Not Yet (2012)	Citizens (2013)	Join the Triumph (2014)

Citizens is the debut studio album by Christian rock band Citizens. It was released on March 12, 2013 by BEC Recordings and Mars Hill Music. The album features worship songs following the modern hymn movement, being combined with indie rock.

After band frontman Zach Bolen's departure from Mars Hill Church in 2014, the album was reissued in 2016 by Gospel Song Records, an imprint of Tooth & Nail Records.

== Background ==
Zach Bolen of Citizens gave an interview to Worship Leader and were asked "Citizens will be your first full-length album. What are your hopes for this record? What are you most excited to share with listeners?"

Our hope is that it would be an encouragement to local churches all over the world and that it would bring about heart transformation through the work of the Holy Spirit. When people listen to the album what they will hear is the gospel being proclaimed. When we sat down and wrote these songs we prayed that the Holy Spirit would help us to do things that we were not capable of doing. This album is a total working of the Holy Spirit and to that we can trust in Him to bring about whatever fruit this album is meant to produce.

— Zach Bolen of Citizens, Worship Leader

=== Songwriting ===
Zach Bolen of Citizens was asked the question in the same interview with Worship Leader that "You have said you write to bring healing and peace to your community, how do you accomplish something like that with music?"

I don't know that I would word it quite like that, except to say that Jesus is peace and healing to both sinners and sufferers. People need to hear the gospel and next to its transformational power the most influential ways of distributing that truth is through preached Word and music. Music in particular is a universal language used throughout the entire world that has a way of allowing you to communicate gospel truth to anyone, who will listen. Music is an amazing gift from God that must never become the object of our affection, but rather a gift we use to outwardly express gratitude to our Creator. (Eph 2:10; Col 1:16)

— Zach Bolen of Citizens, Worship Leader

== Critical reception ==
Professional ratings
Review scores
Source	Rating
CCM Magazine	4/5 stars
Christian Music Zine	4.25/5
Cross Rhythms	8/10 squares
Indie Vision Music	4/5 stars
Jesusfreakhideout.com	4.5/5 stars
Louder Than the Music	4/5 stars
New Release Tuesday	3.5/5 stars

Citizens has received all favorably positive reviews from five critics. At CCM Magazine, Matt Conner told that "the new movement of worship music out of Mars Hill is one of the most imaginative and important shifts within the Christian music industry in years, and Citizens is the latest example alongside The Modern Post and Ghost Ship. Citizens echoes Passion Pit or Two Door Cinema Club comparisons with their club rock groove, and gospel-centric lyrics on each tune bolster their theological importance." Tyler Hess of Christian Music Zine found that Citizens are "appear[ing] to be putting forth an attempt to buck that trend" of what the standard worship album is to be. In addition, Hess alluded us to "ponder what a worship song would sound like with an indie rocker up in front", and add to that "a return to energy and excitement, not just when there are 50,000 people at a festival, but even contained in a studio production" because that is what the album contains. Hess was critical in noting that this "isn't like this is the best album ever created", which means "this album isn't perfect", yet the album "it is simply a step in the right direction, with a huge sound that gives the rest of us a little something to look forward to in the years to come."

Indie Vision Music's Jonathan Andre highlighted that "both musically and lyrically" that the project is "a treasure". Also, Andre called this album "a breath of fresh air in terms of worship and praise in an industry full of similar artist styles and tired and overused themes and messages throughout the many radio and church hits throughout the years." At Louder Than the Music, Jono Davies surmised that "to be fair to Citizen[s], this rock album lets some amazing lyrics pour out of the songs. What Citizen have done is shown that we can still worship God to amazing rock 'n roll songs that punch above their weight." At Jesusfreakhideout.com, Ryan Barbee vowed that "Citizens is an album made for the Christian who has wanted to sing gospel-centered lyrics but not sacrifice artful music on the altar of conformity." Additionally, Barbee evoked that the band has "not only offered up some great tunes - they are paving a new road in music", which is truly "a game-changer."

Jonathan Francesco of New Release Tuesday surmised that "while the song titles for their self-titled debut might not indicate a very original project, the music is actually surprisingly fresh." Francesco noted that "there are numerous musical highpoints on the album that will help it to standout [sic] from the pack. Lyrically, though, it's pretty much the standard fare", but the album "more than accomplishes what it set out to accomplish." Lastly, Francesco found that "Citizens manage to find a workable balance between catchy pop music and uplifting praise and worship." Cross Rhythms' Josh Dipple found that the release "can't be faulted for its energy, with songs that long to be played to big crowds at summer festivals, played expertly by a band who have obviously been studiously taking notes, watching the likes of Kings of Leon and The Strokes."

Readers of Reel Gospel voted Citizens the inaugural winner of Reel Gospel Readers' Album of the Year in 2013.

== Commercial performance ==
On March 23, 2013, the album was the sixth most sold Billboard Top Heatseekers album.

== Track listing ==
Album release
No.	Title	Writer(s)	Length
1.	"Sweetness of Freedom"	Zach Bolen, Brian Eichelberger	3:19
2.	"In Tenderness"	W. Spencer Walton	4:02
3.	"Hail the King"	Bolen, Eichelberger	3:45
4.	"Made Alive"	Bolen, Eichelberger	3:26
5.	"I Am Living in a Land of Death"	Bolen, Eichelberger	6:21
6.	"Jesus!"	Bolen, Eichelberger	3:49
7.	"I Surrender All"	Judson W. Van DeVenter	6:06
8.	"Sins of My Youth"	Bolen, Eichelberger	3:47
9.	"Psalm 18"	Bolen, Eichelberger	4:18
10.	"Praise to the Lord"	Joachim Neander	3:59
11.	"Oh God"	Bolen	5:50
Total length:			48:42

== Personnel ==
Credits are adapted from the album's liner notes.

Citizens

- Zach Bolen
- Nate Garvey
- Nathan Furtado
- Adam Skatula
- Tom McConnell

Additional personnel

- Joey Sanchez – additional drums
- James McAlister – additional percussion

Gang vocals provided by members of Mars Hill, Ballard, and U-District churches.

Technical

- Brian Eichelberger – production, mixing
- Alan Matley – additional engineering
- Brett Baird – additional engineering
- Troy Glessner – mastering

Artwork

- Grant Rowles – design and art direction
- Colin Day – design and art direction
- Jenny Linquist – photography

Management

- Jonathan Dunn – A&R
- Zach Walkingstick – project management

== Charts ==
Album

Chart (2013)	Peak position
US Top Christian Albums (Billboard)	20
US Top Heatseekers (Billboard)	6
