= Teutonia Maennerchor Hall =

- Teutonia Männerchor Hall
- U.S. National Register of Historic Places
- Pittsburgh Landmark – PHLF
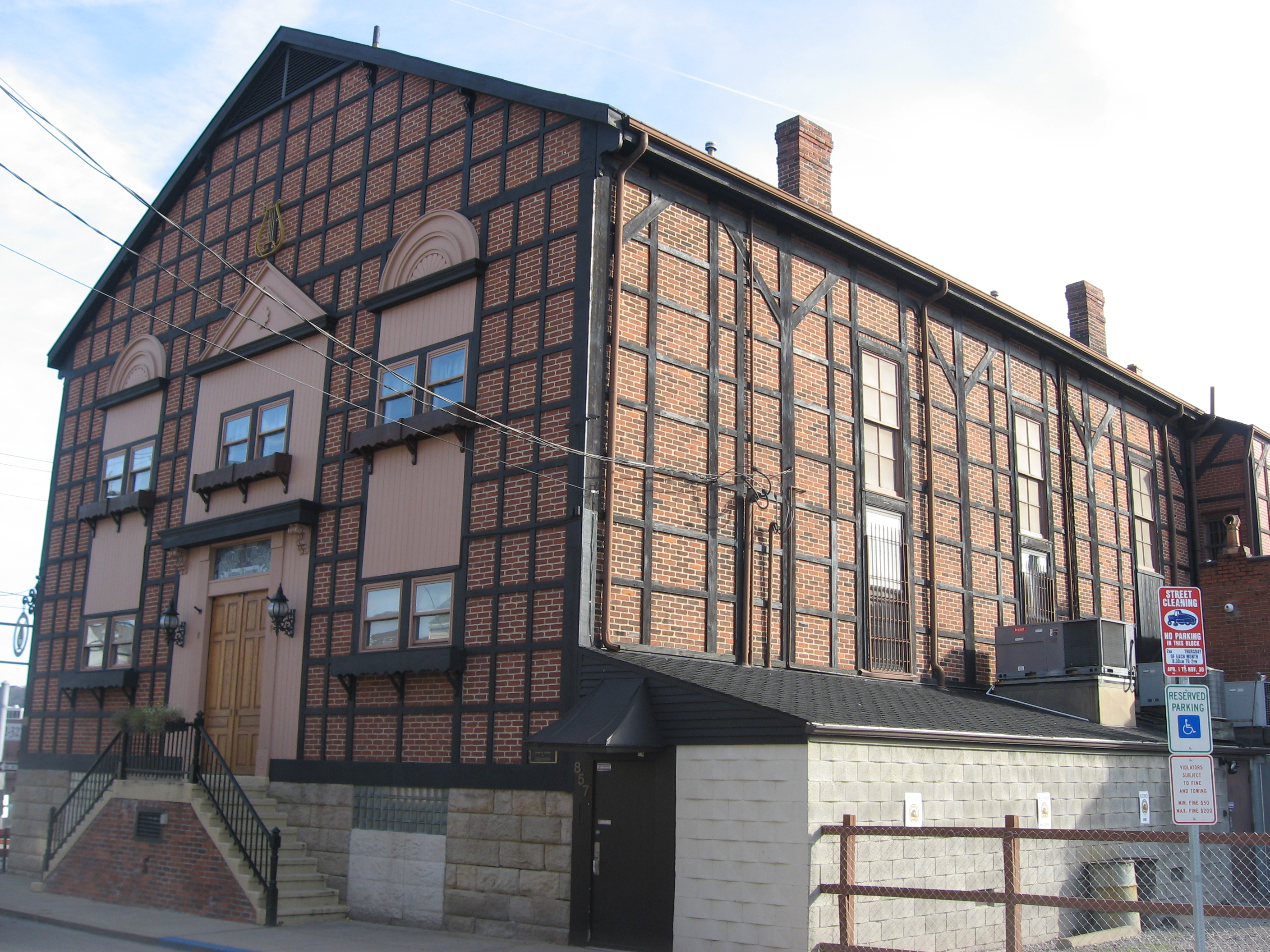
- Front and western side of the hall

- Location within Pittsburgh Location within Pennsylvania Location within the United States
- Location: 857 Phineas St., Pittsburgh, Pennsylvania
- Coordinates: 40°27′24″N 79°59′42″W
- Area: less than one acre
- Built: 1888
- Architect: Ott, George; Stripecke Brothers
- Architectural style: Romanesque
- NRHP reference No.: 04000439

Significant dates
- Added to NRHP: May 14, 2004
- Designated PHLF: 2004

The Teutonia Männerchor Hall (/tjuːˈtoʊniə ˈmɛnərkɔːr ˈhɔːl/) is a historic American building that is located in the Deutschtown neighborhood of Pittsburgh, Pennsylvania.

Built in 1888, it was listed on the National Register of Historic Places in 2004. A private membership club, its purpose is to further choral singing, German cultural traditions and good fellowship. The club features heritage activities and celebrations, including choral singing in German, Oktoberfest, Fasching, Radish Festival, Schützenverein, Maypole and folk dancing.

== History ==
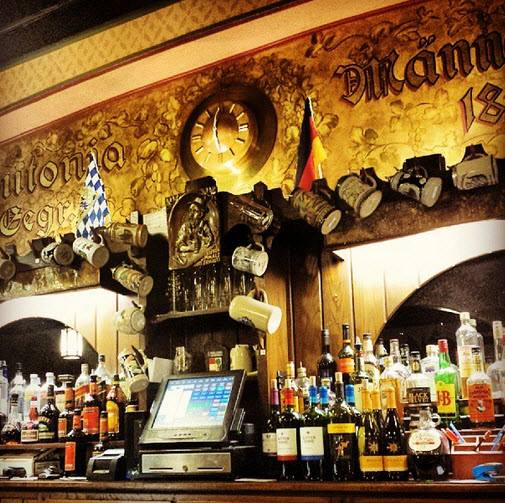
The background of the bar at the Teutonia Männerchor Ratskeller.

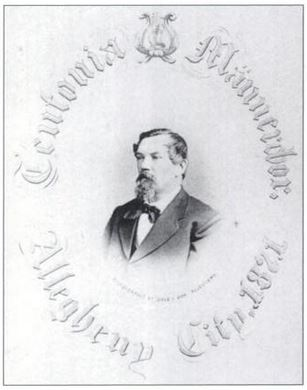
Founder, Reverend Karl R. Weiterhausen

The Teutonia Männerchor was founded in 1854 as an offspring of an organization called “Liederkranz” founded in 1851 by Rev. Karl R. Weiterhausen. Later, the Liederkranz became the Freier Männerchor and then the Teutonia Männerchor. The name Teutonia is in reference to one of the oldest German Tribes. The Teutonia Männerchor is a part of the Pittsburgh district of the Nord-Amerikanischer Sängerbund.

The first meetings were held in the basement of an old Lutheran Church on Canal Street in Pittsburgh, Pennsylvania. In 1882, the chorus practiced in Dahlingers Hall at 121 Madison Avenue in Pittsburgh. The chorus then moved to the old Masonic Hall in Old Allegheny City. Under President Henry Bergman, the property of St. Peter's Church on Pike Street was purchased on February 28, 1887 (Later renamed Phineas Street). The Charter of Incorporation was approved on April 9, 1887, and the present building was built.

The land for the building cost $5,000, and the building was erected for $8,800. The architect was George Ott and the contractor Stipecke Brothers. "Fachwerk", a distinctive type of German architecture, was used for the exterior of the building. This traditional theme has been maintained inside and out to the present day.

The first meeting in the Hall was held on July 15, 1888. The Hall's official dedication took place on October 15, 1888. The decorations were furnished by the Joseph Horne Company of Pittsburgh. Initiation fees were set at $5.00 and dues at $3.00 per year.

The 50th Anniversary of Teutonia was celebrated in grand style on September 26 & 27, 1904, including a parade through the North Side of Pittsburgh.

In 1934, the first floor (or basement) was remodeled. Most of the work was done without compensation by members, and it became a Ratskeller in true German style. In its 80th anniversary year, the organization amended its constitution to honor members of 25 years of service with an honorary “Life Member” membership: This practice continues today. In 1947 the club purchased two adjoining houses to accommodate additions to the Hall, for which $27,000.00 was expended for improvements.

The 100-year Centennial was celebrated in 1954, and on May 16 that year a banquet was held in the upper Sängerhall as well as a concert at Pittsburgh's Carnegie Music Hall on Saturday, June 12, 1954. At the time there were 897 members, including 65 singers in the Male Chorus and 45 singers in the Ladies Chorus.

In 1979, Teutonia celebrated its 125th anniversary, and Seven German Coats of Arms were donated to the club. The crests designate various areas of Germany and are now permanent fixtures on the walls of the upstairs Sängerhall.

Many improvements were made during the 1980s and 1990s. All outside walls were restored, air conditioning was added to the upstairs Sängerhall and kitchen, and bar equipment was replaced. In very recent years members have erected an outdoor Biergarten adjacent to the structure to enhance the club's social gathering opportunities.
