= Árpád Szarvas =

Hungarian musician

- Born: Árpád Szarvas
- Genres: Indie rock, psychedelic pop, electronic music
- Instruments: vocals, guitar
- Years active: 2001–present
- Member of: EZ Basic

Árpád Szarvas is a musician, best known as the lead singer, songwriter, lyricist, guitarist of EZ Basic. He is also the head of editorial and marketing partnerships at a major global music distributor (Believe) since 2019.

== Early life and personal life ==
Szarvas is from Szabadka and lived in Szeged, Hungary, however, he moved to the capital city, Budapest after graduating at Faculty of Arts and Humanities at the University of Szeged to pursue a musical career.

== EZ Basic ==
Szarvas played guitar in Pale Blue Eyes, a Szeged-based noise rock band while attending secondary school. The band played music influenced by The Velvet Underground, Nick Cave and the Bad Seeds, Sonic Youth, and Joy Division. However, before his university studies, he left the band and formed EZ Basic with his friend Dénes Pesztalics. He is the founding member and the songwriter of EZ Basic. Apart from EZ Basic, he also released music under the name Evil Men Have No Songs and Models Can't Fuck.

== Discography ==
With EZ Basic:

Albums and EPs

- EZ To Say EP (2007)
- Hocus Focus (2007)
- Hello Heavy (2010)
- Memories of Spring EP (2012)
- Dead End Darling (2015)
- Sissyfuzz (2017)
- Resonance (2021)
- Nocturner (2024)

With Evil Men Have No Songs:

Albums and EPs

- Evil Men Have No Songs EP (2010)
- Always Somewhere Else EP (2012)
- Where We Come From EP (2013)

With Models Can't Fuck:

Albums and EPs

- Move To Iceland EP (2011)
- Models Can't Fuck EP (2017)

Singles

- Ghost Kid (2010, with Models Can't Fuck)
- Home Tonight (2010, with Evil Men Have No Songs)
- Move To Iceland (Möbel remix) (2012, with Models Can't Fuck)
- New Lines (2013, with EZ Basic)
- Unnatural (2014, with EZ Basic)
- Whatcha Gonna Do With Your Life? (2015, with EZ Basic)
- Stay In (2021, with EZ Basic)
- Next Time (2021, with EZ Basic)
- Lost Shores (2024, with EZ Basic)
- Strained Love (2024, with EZ Basic)

== See also ==
- EZ Basic
