= Serviceplan Group =

European advertising agency

Serviceplan Group SE & Co. KG
- Industry: Advertising
- Founded: Munich, Germany, 1970
- Founder: Peter Haller
- Headquarters: Munich, Germany
- Key people: Florian Haller, CEO
- Revenue: 873 million Euro (2025/2026)
- Number of employees: 6500+ (2025)
- Subsidiaries: Serviceplan Americas
- Website: www.house-of-communication.com/de/en.html

Serviceplan Group SE & Co. KG is the largest owner-operated advertising agency groups in Europe, headquartered in Munich, followed by Jung von Matt. Serviceplan includes more than 60 specialized agencies and employs more than 6,500 people.

== History ==
The agency was founded in 1970 by Dr. Peter Haller and Rolf O. Stempel. In addition to the traditional advertising area the agency developed other areas of business. So in 1983 “Mediaplus” for media planning and procurement and in 1986 “Facit” marketing research were founded. 1995 Serviceplan was restructured to a business organization with a holding company. In 1997 “Plan.Net” was launched.

1998 Rolf O. Stempel resigned as CEO but remained shareholders. On 1 July 2002 Dr. Peter Haller handed over the position as CEO to his son Florian Haller but remained managing director of the group holding company. Since 2002 Serviceplan operates as Serviceplan Group für Innovative Kommunikation. In 2004 the agency launched the Best Brands Awards in cooperation with GfK, SevenOne Media, Wirtschaftswoche, GWP media-marketing and the German Markenverband (brand association). In 2005, the “Innovation Day” was launched taking place annually. After opening offices in Hamburg in April 2006 and in Berlin at the end of 2007, the establishment of new branches as well as entering into partnerships with other communication agencies continues.

Serviceplan Solutions was founded in 2012 with a focus on implementing advertising for international markets. In March 2016, the Serviceplan Consulting Group was established to advise clients on brand and communication strategy, digital business, and digital transformation.

In 2019, the company’s official name was changed to Serviceplan Group SE & Co. KG, reflecting its international orientation. At the same time, the group introduced a new governance structure with the formation of a supervisory board. The board initially included company founder Peter Haller (who stepped down from the management board), Sybille Stempel (daughter of co-founder Rolf O. Stempel), and former RTL executive Anke Schäferkordt. The current members of the supervisory board are Peter Haller, Anke Schäferkordt, Jerry Buhlmann, and Christoph Jung.

In July 2020, the Serviceplan Group announced that its German offices would become climate neutral by the end of that year, with international locations expected to follow by 2022.

In July 2022, the Serviceplan Group moved from its old headquarters in Brienner Straße to Friedenstraße 24. The new site houses around 1,700 employees. A section of the premises, referred to as the ‘überlab’, is designated for use by external organisations.

In October 2022, the Serviceplan Group began working on Web3 technologies, including blockchain and the metaverse. As part of this initiative, the studio ‘Serviceplan DCNTRL’ was founded, which now operates under the name Plan.Net Studios. Serviceplan Group founded two AI labs in 2024 – in Munich and Silverside AI in San Francisco. By the end of 2024, the agency group set up its own AI agents and the blockchain-based Masumi protocol, which allows AI agents to work together securely and pay each other. In 2025, Sōkosumi was created as a marketplace for AI agents that all companies can use.

== Organization ==
Today, a wide range of specialised companies operate under the umbrella of the Serviceplan Group, organised into three main agency brands: Serviceplan, Mediaplus and Plan.Net. Each brand encompasses companies with distinct focus areas, all led by at least one managing director for consulting and one for creation. For example, Serviceplan Public Relations & Content focuses on PR, Plan.Net Studios specialises in spatial computing and Web3, while Mediaplus is dedicated to media planning.

== Serviceplan Group Board Members ==
- Florian Haller, CEO Group
- Matthias Brüll, Mediaplus
- Markus Noder, Serviceplan + International
- Dr. Fabian Prüschenk, Finance & Operations
- Karin Maria Schertler, Corporate Strategy
- Sanja Scheuer, People & Culture
- Alexander Schill, Creative & Innovation
- Christian Schmitz, Plan.Net

=== Supervisory board members ===
- Dr. Peter Haller, Chairman of the supervisory board
- Jerry Buhlmann
- Christoph Jung
- Anke Schäferkordt

== Clients (Selection) ==
ADAC, AOK, AIDA, Bacardi Germany, Beiersdorf, Bitburger, BMW, Bosch, BSH, Federal Government of Germany, Carglass, Castrol, CDU, Condé Nast, Continental, Cortal Consors, DATEV, Degussa, De’Longhi, Deichmann, Europcar, E.ON, HiPP, KFC, LEGO, Liftstar, Lufthansa, Media Markt Saturn, Miele, MINI, Minijob-Zentrale, Novartis, Paulaner, Penny, Rolf Benz, Rügenwalder Mühle, Siemens, Sony Ericsson, ThyssenKrupp, Trilux, UNICEF, Weight Watchers, ZDF.

== Internationalization ==
In 2006, CEO Florian Haller began with the internationalization of the Serviceplan group: In addition to the German offices in Munich, Hamburg, Bremen and Berlin six own international offices in Paris (2006), Zurich (2008), Vienna, Brussels, Dubai (all 2010) and Milan (2011) were added.

In 2020, San Francisco was added as a new location and in 2022 Stockholm with the founding of Mediaplus Nordics. Through cooperation with other partner agencies, the Serviceplan Group has also been established in Tokyo, Taipei City, Bangkok, Kuala Lumpur, Jakarta, Singapore, Hanoi, Manila and Sydney. As of 2025, the global agency network of the Serviceplan group comprises a total of 43 locations in 23 countries.

Markus Noder has been responsible for the operational implementation of the agency group's internationalisation as Managing Director of Serviceplan International since the beginning of 2013. On 1 January 2018, he was appointed to the management board of the overall holding company.

== Awards ==
At the 72nd Cannes Lions in 2025, the Group won 19 Lions and also received the awards ‘Independent Network of the Year’ and ‘Independent Agency of the Year’.

At the 69th International Advertising Festival in Cannes in June 2022, the Serviceplan Group received a total of eleven awards: in addition to a ‘Grand Prix’, a Titanium Lion, four Gold Lions, three Silver Lions and three Bronze Lions, the agency group was also named ‘Independent Network of the Year’.

At the New York Advertising Festivals, the Serviceplan Group was named ‘Independent Agency of the Year 2019’. Serviceplan and Plan.Net jointly took first place in the creative ranking of the German Federal Association of the Digital Economy.
