= Razzmatazz Orfeum =

Studio album by The Moog
- Released: 21 July 2009
- Recorded: early 2009
- Genre: Indie rock
- Length: 37:00
- Label: MuSick, United States
- Producer: Geoff Ott

The Moog chronology
Sold for Tomorrow (2007)	Razzmatazz Orfeum (2009)	Seasons in the Underground (2012)

Professional ratings
Review scores
Source	Rating
The Washington Post	
Allmusic	
AbsolutePunk	(81%)
The Red Alert	
Ventvox	
Wonka Vision Magazine	
Est	(7/10)

Razzmatazz Orfeum is the second studio album recorded by The Moog. The album was produced by Geoff Ott (Pearl Jam, Queen Of The Stone Age, Mark Lanegan) and recorded in Seattle, Washington, The United States. The first single, You Raised A Vampire, was released in colored vinyl 7" with stunning artwork by Gris Grimly. The 7" also includes a B-side cover (recorded in Budapest, Citysound Studio, recording engineer Marton Palinkas, mixed and mastered by Geoff Ott, Seattle) of the Bauhaus classic The Passion Of Lovers featuring Bauhaus/Love and Rockets bassist/vocalist David J, who became a fan of the band after seeing them perform in Hollywood, Los Angeles, California in 2008. The video for You Raised A Vampire was shot in the same gothic building where the first Underworld movie was made in Budapest, Hungary where.

== Track listing ==
1. "This is horror"
2. "Panic"
3. "You Raised A Vampire"
4. "When I See You"
5. "Can’t Say No, Can’t Say Yes"
6. "Lost Day"
7. "Joyclad Armies"
8. "Sphinx"
9. "Make Me Happy"
10. "Self and Soul"
11. "Mina"
12. "Epilogue"
