= Yōzō =

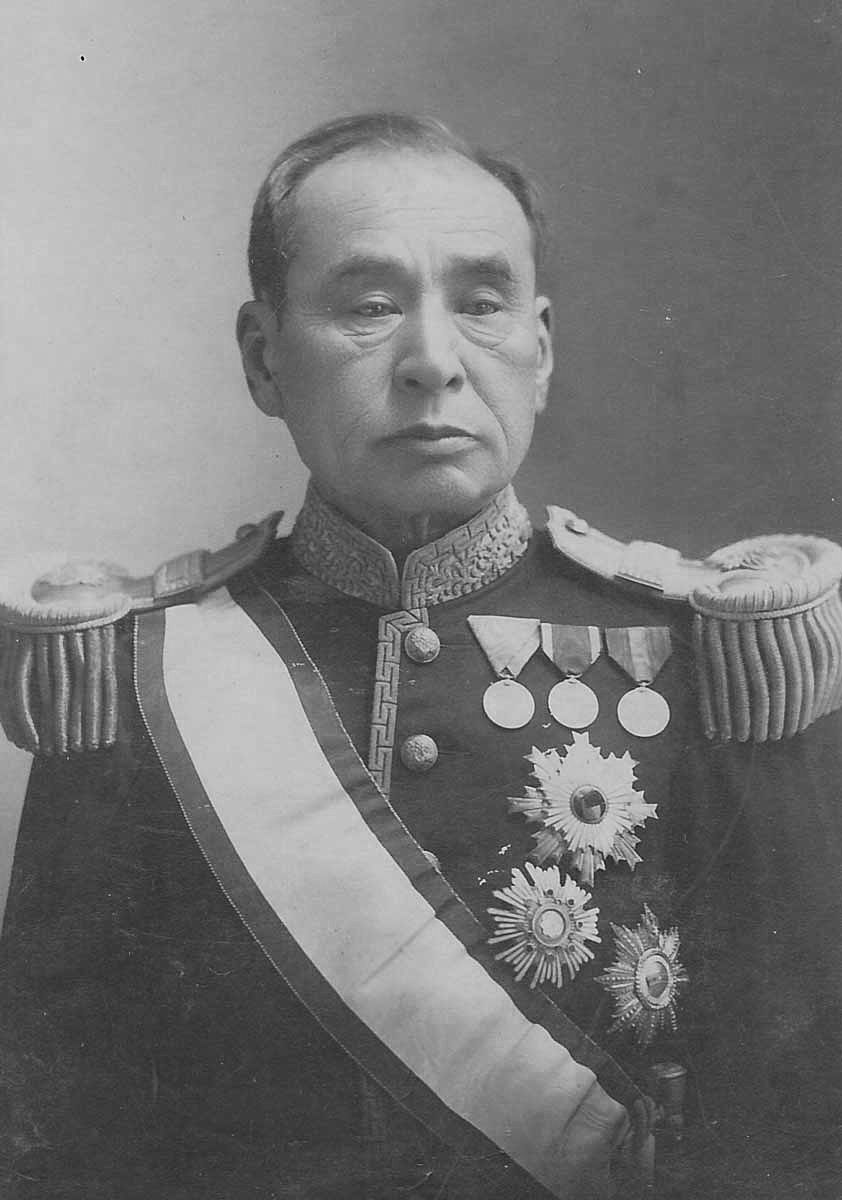
- Yozo Yamao (1837–1917), Japanese samurai of the late Edo period
- Pronunciation: joɯdzoɯ (IPA)
- Gender: Male

Origin
- Origin: Japanese
- Meaning: Different meanings depending on the kanji used

Other names
- Alternative spelling: Yozo (Kunrei-shiki) Yozo (Nihon-shiki) Yōzō, Yozo, Youzou (Hepburn)

Yōzō, Yozo or Youzou is a masculine Japanese given name.

== Written forms ==
Yōzō can be written using different combinations of kanji characters. Here are some examples:

- 洋三, "ocean, 3"
- 洋蔵, "ocean, store up"
- 洋造, "ocean, create"
- 陽三, "sunshine, 3"
- 陽蔵, "sunshine, store up"
- 陽造, "sunshine, create"
- 容三, "contain, 3"
- 容蔵, "contain, store up"
- 容造, "contain, create"
- 葉三, "leaf, 3"
- 葉蔵, "leaf, store up"
- 曜三, "weekday,3"
- 曜蔵, "weekday, store up"
- 要三, "essential, 3"
- 用蔵, "utilize, store up"
- 蓉三, "lotus, 3"
- 蓉蔵, "lotus, store up"
- 庸三, "common, 3"

The name can also be written in hiragana ようぞう or katakana ヨウゾウ.

== Notable people with the name ==
- Yozo Aoki (青木 要三; 1929–2014), Japanese footballer
- Yozo Ishikawa (石川 要三; 1925–2014), Japanese politician
- Yozo Matsushima (松島 与三; 1921–1983), Japanese mathematician
- Yozo Toyoshima (豊島 陽蔵; 1852–1922), Japanese mayor
- Yozo Yamao (山尾 庸三; 1837–1917), Japanese samurai of the late Edo period
- Yozo Yokota (横田 洋三, 1940–2019), Japanese lawyer
