= Sold for Tomorrow =

Studio album by The Moog
- Released: 10 April 2007
- Genre: Indie rock
- Length: 37:00
- Label: MuSick
- Producer: Gergő Dorozsmai

The Moog chronology
Sold for Tomorrow (2007)	Razzmatazz Orfeum (2009)

Professional ratings
Review scores
Source	Rating
Allmusic	3.5/5 stars
PopMatters	(7/10)

Sold for Tomorrow is the debut album of the band The Moog. A "Digital Only Bonus Version" song, "Hit Song" was included on the EMusic website.

== Track listing ==
1. "Your Sweet Neck"
2. "Everybody Wants"
3. "I Don't Want You Now"
4. "I Like You"
5. "Never Hide!"
6. "If I Died"
7. "Anyone"
8. "Survive"
9. "Goodbye"
10. "Xanax Youth"
