= Short Fictions =

American alternative music group

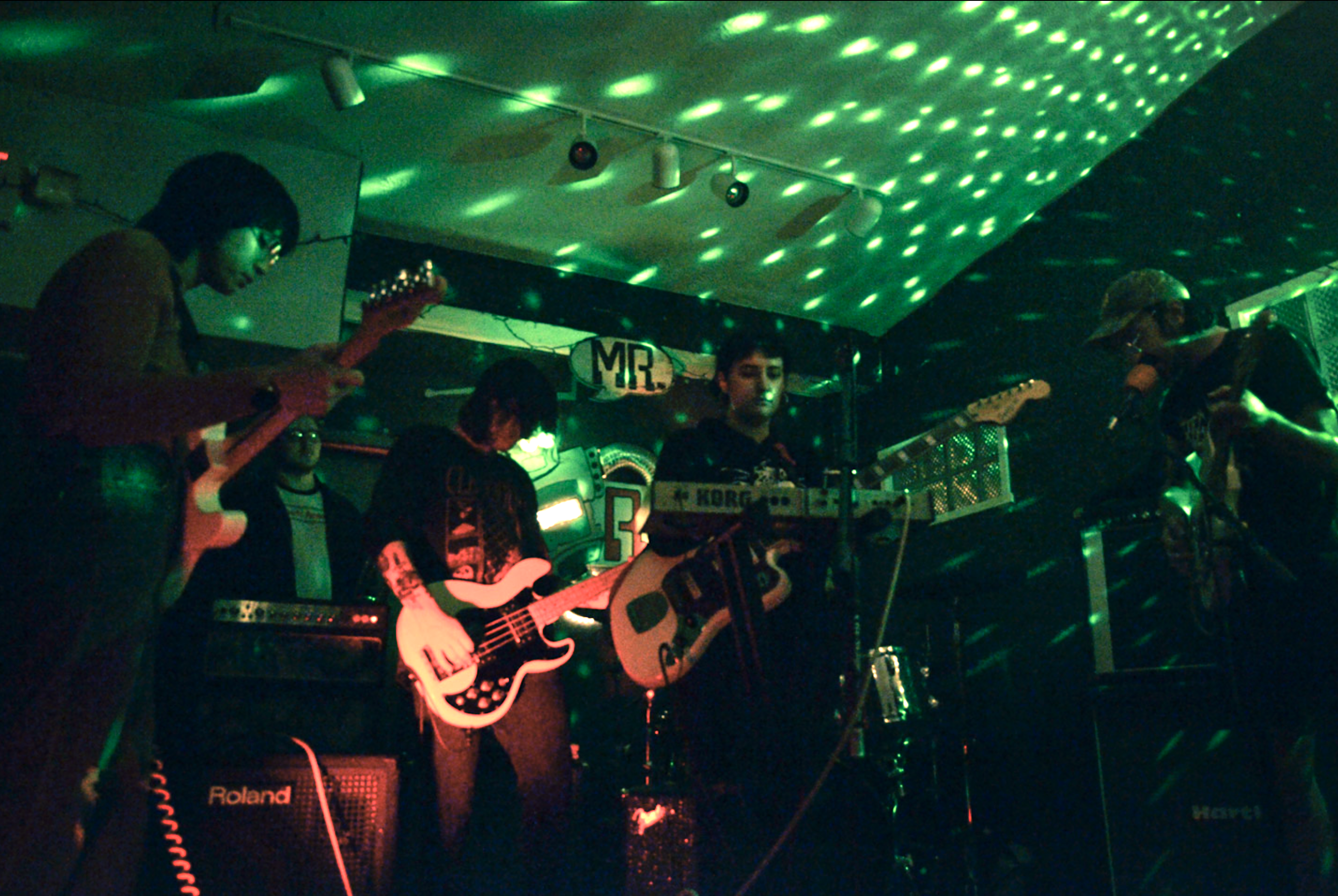
- Short Fictions performing at Mr. Roboto Project in October 2021. Left to right: Chloe June, Nick Bursick, Alex Martin, Alex Barkley and Sam Treber

Background information
- Origin: Pittsburgh, Pennsylvania
- Genres: Emo: Indie rock
- Years active: 2015–present
- Labels: You've Got a Friend in Pennsylvania; Crafted Sounds; Middle Man; Acrobat Unstable; Lauren
- Members: Sam Treber; Chloe June; Alex Barkley; Ryan Veith; Nick Bursick
- Past members: Shimpei Blackriver; Sebastian Ho; Alex Martin
- Website: shortfictions.bandcamp.com

Short Fictions is an American indie rock band based in Pittsburgh, Pennsylvania. The band consists of Sam Treber on guitar and vocals, Chloe June on guitar, Alex Barkley on Bass, Ryan Veith on drums, and Nick Bursick on trombone.

== History ==
The band formed in 2015 and initially consisted of Sam Treber, Shimpei Blackriver, and Sebastian Ho. The three were joined by Alex Martin, Alex Barkley, and Ryan Veith in 2017. Sebastian Ho left the band in 2018. Nick Bursick joined in 2019 amidst a month long tour that ultimately resulted in his joining the band permanently. In 2020 Alex Martin left their role as bassist to pursue a management role. Shimpei Blackriver left the group in 2020; his guitar duties were then picked up by Chloe June.

The band released three extended plays before releasing their debut album in December, 2019. Their debut EP, Light Ascending out of Gloom: a Collection of Short Fictions and Poetry came out in May 2016. A year later, their second EP The Heart Is a Kaleidoscope was released, followed by There's a Dark Shadow on the Flames of the Burning Sun in 2018.

On December 13, 2019, the band's debut album, Fates Worse than Death, was released. It was met with positive critical reception.

== Discography ==
=== Studio albums ===
Title	Details
Light Ascending out of Gloom: a Collection of Short Fictions and Poetry	Released: May 20, 2016; Label: You've Got a Friend in Pennsylvania; Format: CD, vinyl, cassette, digital download
Fates Worse Than Death	Released: December 13, 2019; Label: Lauren Records; Format: CD, vinyl, cassette, digital download
Every Moment of Every Day	Released: June 24, 2022; Label: Lauren Records, Big Scary Monsters (UK/EU); Format: CD, vinyl, digital download
Oblivion Will Own Me and Death Alone Will Love Me (Void Filler)	Released: October 6, 2023; Label: Lauren Records; Format: CD, vinyl, cassette, digital download

=== Extended plays ===
Title	Details
Demo	Released: February 3, 2015; Label: Self-released; Format: digital download
The Heart Is a Kaleidoscope	Released: November 4, 2017; Label: Crafted Sounds; Format: vinyl, cassette, digital download
There's a Dark Shadow on the Flames of the Burning Sun, Pt. 1	Released: October 4, 2018; Label: Crafted Sounds; Format: vinyl, cassette, digital download
Short Fictions on Audiotree Live	Released: October 13, 2020; Label: Audiotree; Format: digital download
There's a Dark Shadow on the Flames of the Burning Sun Pt II	Released: November 6, 2023; Label: Lauren Records; Format: vinyl, digital download
