= Nord-Amerikanischer Sängerbund =

- Abbreviation: NASB
- Formation: 1848
- Type: Non-profit organization
- Purpose: To promote and maintain German music and songs, German customs and the German language, as well as stimulate fraternization and unity of all Germanic singing societies on the North American Continent.
- Location: Evansville, Ohio
- Official language: English, German
- Affiliations: Deutscher Chorverband (http://www.dcvg.de)
- Website: https://nasaengerbund.org

The Nord-Amerikanischer Sängerbund (English: North American Singers' Association) is an association which promotes the culture of German music, culture and song.

Eligibility for the association is open to any independent Germanic singing society located in North America consisting of at least 12 singers at the time of their application.

== History ==
In 1848, the singer districts (Sängerbezirks) of Ohio, Kentucky, Maryland, and Indiana created the Nord-Amerikanischer Sängerbund. It is estimated that by 1908, there were 50,000 singer-members in the Sängerbund. Membership in individual clubs consists of immigrants from Germany and their descendants to germanophiles who enjoy German song and culture.

== Sängerfests ==
There have been Sängerfests since 1849, and as of 2013, there have been 61 Sängerfests held anywhere from annually to an 11-year gap during 1938 to 1949, a period of World War II, and recovery in Europe and the US. Sängerfests have been consistently held every three years since 1949.

== Choir Districts (Sängerbezirks) ==
The NASB is divided into eight main districts, and one independent district not aligned with the other districts.

District	Clubs
Central Ohio	16
Chicago	10
Michigan	4
Pittsburgh	7
Southern Ohio, Kentucky, Indiana, and Illinois	14
Southern	13
Saint Louis	8
Wisconsin	8
Independent	2
