= Chess (disambiguation) =

Chess is a two-player board game.

Chess or CHESS may also refer to:

== Arts, entertainment, and media ==
=== Fictional characters ===
- Chess (One Piece), a fictional character in Eiichirō Oda's manga
- Chess, a villain in the 2011 TV series The Cape
- Chess Warmwater, a character in Reservation Blues by Sherman Alexie

=== Games ===
- Chess (macOS)
- Chess (Northwestern University), a pioneering chess program from the 1970s
- Chess variants, including:
  - Business chess
  - Chaturanga, also named chatur or catur; an old variant
  - Fairy chess, standard chess with unusual pieces, rules, or board
  - Hiashatar, or Mongolian chess
  - Indian chess
  - Janggi, or Korean chess
  - Jangju, or Manchu chess
  - Jetan, or Martian chess
  - Makruk, or Thai chess
  - Shatar, or Mongolian chess
  - Shatranj, or Persian chess
  - Shogi, sometimes called Japanese chess
  - Sittuyin, or Burmese chess
  - Three-dimensional chess
  - Xiangqi, or Chinese chess
- Chess Titans, a computer chess game with 3D graphics developed by Oberon Games and included in Windows Vista and Windows 7 Home Premium
- Chess.com, an internet chess server and social networking website
- GNU Chess, a free software chess engine

=== Other uses in arts entertainment, and media ===
- Chess (2006 film), a Malayalam film
- Chess (2008 film), working title of the film Who Do You Love?
- CHESS magazine, published monthly in the UK
- Chess (musical)
- Chess (poem), a c. 1565 poem by Jan Kochanowski
- Chess Records, an American record label
- Chess (Madetoja), a composition by Leevi Madetoja

== Organizations ==
- Army CHESS (Computer Hardware Enterprise Software and Solutions)
- Chess Communication, a Norwegian mobile virtual network operator
- Coalition of Higher Education Students in Scotland

== Science and technology ==
- Chess, a type of brome grass often considered a weed
- Australian Clearing House and Electronic Sub-register System, an Australian electronic register of approved securities holdings
- Cornell High Energy Synchrotron Source, a high-intensity X-ray lightsource

== Other uses ==
- Chess (surname)
- Chess, a floorboard of a pontoon bridge
- Chess pie
- River Chess, in Buckinghamshire, England

== See also ==
- Chess in early literature
- Topics in chess
  - Glossary of chess
  - History of chess
  - Timeline of chess
  - Outline of chess
- Chess piece (disambiguation)
- Chess player (disambiguation)
- Chinese chess (disambiguation)
- Viking chess (disambiguation)
- Cheese (disambiguation)
