= Chess (surname) =

Chess is a surname. Notable people with the surname include:

- Edwin R. Chess (1913–2000), United States Air Force general
- Jamar Chess (born 1980s), American music manager
- Leonard Chess (1917–1969), record company executive
- Lisa Chess, American actress
- Marshall Chess (born 1942), American record producer
- Mary Chess (1878–1964), American perfumer
- Phil Chess (1921–2016), American record producer
- Richard Chess (poet) (born 1953), American poet
- Richard B. Chess (born 1953), American politician
- Sammie Chess, Jr. (1934–2022), American attorney, civil rights activist, and judge
- Stanley Chess, American legal commentator
- Stella Chess (1914–2007), American child psychiatrist

== Fictional characters ==
- Harry Chess, main character of the comic strip Harry Chess: That Man from A.U.N.T.I.E.
- Jane and Ryan Chess, characters in the 2016 American workplace teen comedy movie Hickey
