= Richard Chess =

Richard Chess may refer to:

- Richard B. Chess (1913–1982), American politician
- Richard Chess (poet) (born 1953), American academic and poet
