= 象棋 =

象棋 may refer to:

- Xiangqi or Chinese chess
- Shogi or Japanese chess
- Janggi or Korean chess
- Shatar or Mongolian chess
- Makruk or Thai chess
- Sittuyin or Burmese chess

== See also ==
- Chinese chess (disambiguation)
