= Dan Deasy =

American politician

Daniel Deasy
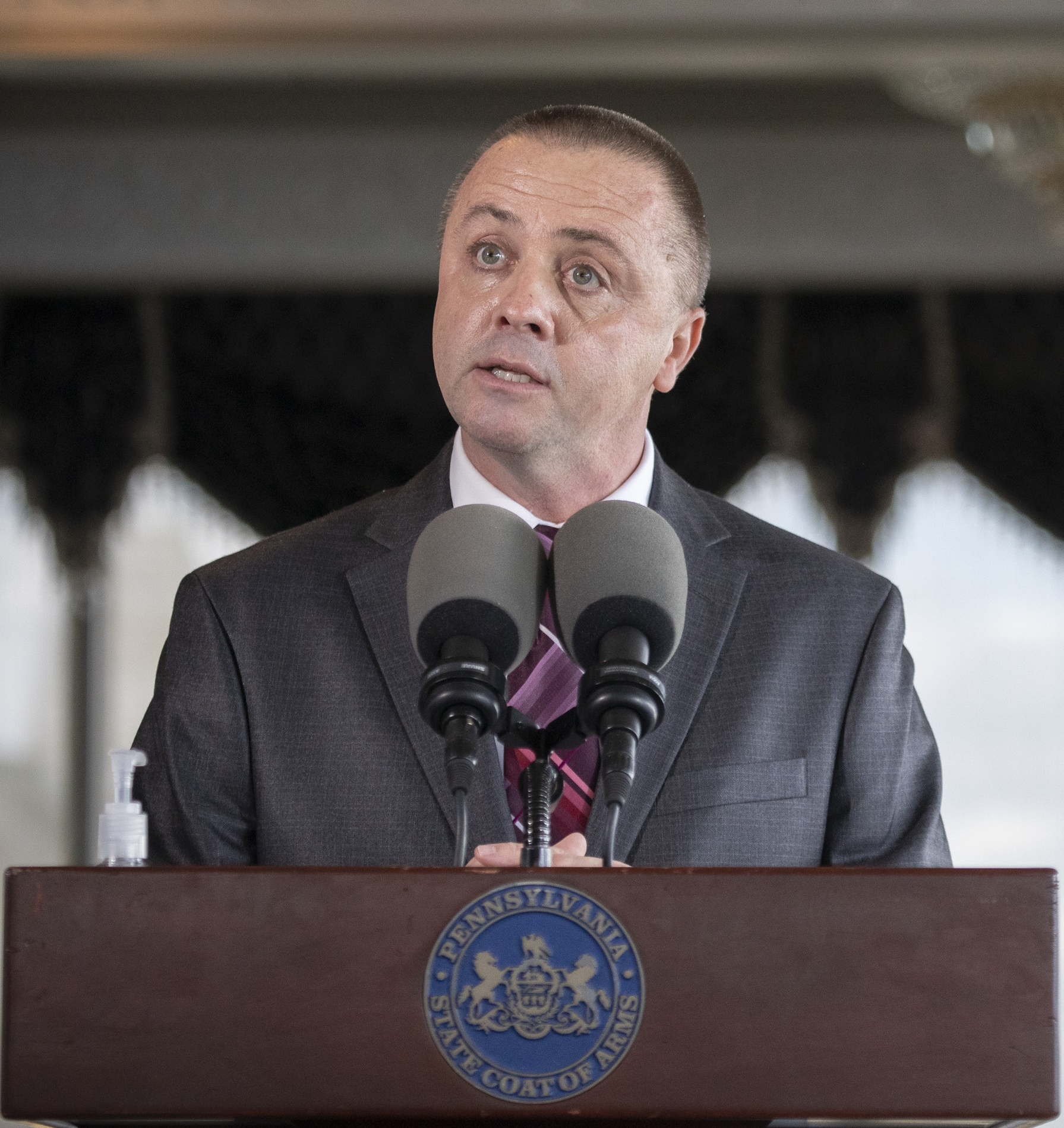

Member of the Pennsylvania House of Representatives from the 27th district
- Incumbent
- Assumed office January 6, 2009
- Preceded by: Thomas C. Petrone

Personal details
- Born: August 1, 1966 (age 60) Pittsburgh, Pennsylvania, US
- Party: Democratic
- Spouse: Kelly Skeba Deasy
- Education: University of Pittsburgh

Daniel Deasy is a Democratic member of the Pennsylvania House of Representatives. Deasy graduated from Bishop Canevin High School and attended the University of Pittsburgh. He worked as a foreman for the Pittsburgh Department of Public Works before running for Pittsburgh City Council. Deasy is also currently chairman of the Pittsburgh Water and Sewer Authority.

== Committee assignments ==
- Liquor Control, Democratic Chair
