= Chess player (disambiguation) =

A chess player is someone who plays the game of chess.

Chess player or Chess Players may also refer to:

== Film and television ==
- Chess Player (TV series), or Go Player, 2006 Chinese TV series
- The Chess Player (Le Joueur d'échecs), a 1927 film directed by Raymond Bernard
- The Chess Player (1938 film), a French historical drama film
- The Chess Players (film), a 1977 film directed by Satyajit Ray

== Fine arts ==
- The Chess Players (Daumier), c. 1863-1867 painting by Honoré Daumier
- The Chess Players (de Mans painting), c. 1670 painting by Cornelis de Man
- The Chess Players (Eakins), 1876 painting by Thomas Eakins
- The Chess Players (Favén), 1913 painting by Antti Favén
- The Chess Players (Lavery), a 1929 painting by John Lavery
- The Chess Players (sculpture), a 1983 sculpture by Lloyd Lillie in Washington, D.C., United States

== Other uses ==
- Chess Player's Chronicle, a 19th-century British chess magazine
- Chess Player 2150, a 1989 chess video game

== See also ==
- List of chess players
