= Marine Corps Common Hardware Suite =

Marine Corps Common Hardware Suite (MCHS) is an IT hardware procurement contract for the United States Marine Corps operating forces and the United States Department of the Navy. MCHS is a five-year, indefinite delivery/indefinite quantity, multiple-award contract for commercial-off-the-shelf computer systems, including ruggedized and non-ruggedized desktops and laptops, as well as servers and other associated computer equipment and accessories. The Marine Corps Common Hardware Suite is intended to provide common computing platforms and global logistics support for hardware purchased by Marine Corps Systems Command (MARCORSYSCOM). MCHS is intended to allow the Marine Corps to gain economies of scale and lower prices by bundling its technology requirements into a single contract

== Scope ==
Procurement of commercial-off-the-shelf computer hardware.

== MCHS Contract Vehicle Awards ==
Based on a possible five-year period of performance, with contract awards being broken into a three-year base period and an option to be extended for an additional two years, MCHS has an estimated value of $775 million. Ten companies have been selected as equipment providers for MCHS. These companies will bid on Marine Corps computer buys that will provide commercial-off-the-shelf computer systems and related accessories.

- Blue Tech, Inc.
- CDW-G
- Countertrade Products, Inc.
- Dell, Inc.
- Intelligent Decisions, Inc.
- Integration Technologies Group, Inc.
- Iron Bow Technologies
- NCS Technologies, Inc.
- Unicom Government
- World Wide Technology, Inc.

== See also ==
- Army CHESS (Computer Hardware Enterprise Software and Solutions)
