= Thomas C. Petrone =

American politician (1937–2014)

Thomas Charles Petrone

Member of the Pennsylvania House of Representatives from the 27th district
- In office January 6, 1981 – November 24, 2008
- Preceded by: Richard B. Chess
- Succeeded by: Daniel J. Deasy

Personal details
- Born: July 31, 1937 Pittsburgh, Pennsylvania
- Died: August 5, 2014 (aged 77) Pittsburgh, Pennsylvania
- Party: Democratic
- Spouse: Marlene Ricchiuto

Military service
- Allegiance: United States
- Branch/service: United States Navy
- Years of service: 1956 — 1958

Thomas Charles "Tom" Petrone (July 21, 1937 – August 5, 2014) was a Democratic member of the Pennsylvania House of Representatives for the 27th District and was elected in 1980. He died in 2014.
