= Pennsylvania House of Representatives, District 27 =

American legislative district

Pennsylvania's 27th State House of Representatives district
Representative
Dan Deasy; D–Pittsburgh
- Population (2022): 61,874

The 27th Pennsylvania House of Representatives District is in southwestern Pennsylvania and has been represented by Dan Deasy since 2009.

== District profile ==
The 27th Pennsylvania House of Representatives District is located in Allegheny County and includes the following areas:

- Crafton
- Green Tree
- Heidelberg
- Ingram
- Pittsburgh (part)
  - Ward 19 (part)
    - Division 01
    - Division 02
    - Division 03
    - Division 04
    - Division 05
    - Division 06
    - Division 07
    - Division 08
    - Division 09
    - Division 10
    - Division 13
    - Division 28
  - Ward 20
    - Division 01
    - Division 02
    - Division 03
    - Division 04
    - Division 05
    - Division 06
    - Division 07
    - Division 14
    - Division 15
    - Division 16
    - Division 17
    - Division 18
  - Ward 28
- Rosslyn Farms
- Scott Township
- Thornburg

== Representatives ==
Representative	Party	Years	District home	Note
Prior to 1969, seats were apportioned by county.
Robert A. Geisler	Democrat	1969 – 1978		
Richard B. Chess	Democrat	1979 – 1980		
Thomas C. Petrone	Democrat	1981 – 2008	Pittsburgh	Retired
Daniel J. Deasy	Democrat	2009 – present	Pittsburgh	Incumbent

== Recent election results ==
PA House election, 2024: Pennsylvania House, District 27
Party	Candidate	Votes	%
Democratic	Dan Deasy (incumbent)	Unopposed	
Total votes		26,101	100.00
Democratic hold			

PA House election, 2022: Pennsylvania House, District 27
Party	Candidate	Votes	%
Democratic	Dan Deasy (incumbent)	18,374	68.98
Republican	Ed Brosky	8,263	31.02
Total votes		26,637	100.00
Democratic hold			

PA House election, 2020: Pennsylvania House, District 27
Party	Candidate	Votes	%
Democratic	Dan Deasy (incumbent)	Unopposed	
Total votes		26,109	100.00
Democratic hold			

PA House election, 2018: Pennsylvania House, District 27
Party	Candidate	Votes	%
Democratic	Dan Deasy (incumbent)	Unopposed	
Total votes		19,540	100.00
Democratic hold			

PA House election, 2016: Pennsylvania House, District 27
Party	Candidate	Votes	%
Democratic	Dan Deasy (incumbent)	Unopposed	
Total votes		24,380	100.00
Democratic hold			

PA House election, 2014: Pennsylvania House, District 27
Party	Candidate	Votes	%
Democratic	Dan Deasy (incumbent)	Unopposed	
Total votes		12,309	100.00
Democratic hold			

PA House election, 2012: Pennsylvania House, District 27
Party	Candidate	Votes	%
Democratic	Dan Deasy (incumbent)	Unopposed	
Total votes		21,034	100.00
Democratic hold			

PA House election, 2010: Pennsylvania House, District 27
Party	Candidate	Votes	%
Democratic	Dan Deasy (incumbent)	11,567	76.00
Reform	Frank Liberatore	3,653	24.00
Total votes		15,220	100.00
Democratic hold			
