= Viking chess =

Viking chess may refer to:

- Kubb (Stickey Sticks in Britain) a lawn game that is akin to horseshoes and lawn bowl, knocking down wickets with thrown sticks
- Hnefatafl (Throw Board in Medieval Britain), a board game unrelated to the "chess" family, that was supplanted by western chess.

== See also ==
- Viking (disambiguation)
- Chess (disambiguation)
