= Chess piece (disambiguation) =

A chess piece is a game piece for playing a game of chess on a chess board.

Chess piece may also refer to:

- Chess Pieces (MÄR), a fictional organization in the anime and manga series MÄR: Märchen Awakens Romance
- "Chesspiece", a song by Chinese singer Faye Wong, from the 1994 album Sky

== See also ==
- Chess (disambiguation)
