= Robert Geisler =

American politician

Robert A. Geisler

Member of the Pennsylvania House of Representatives from the 27th district
- In office 1969–1978
- Preceded by: District created
- Succeeded by: Richard B. Chess

Member of the Pennsylvania House of Representatives from the Allegheny County district
- In office 1967–1968

Personal details
- Born: July 19, 1925 Pittsburgh, Pennsylvania
- Died: April 7, 1993 (aged 67)
- Party: Democratic
- Education: Duquesne University

Robert A. Geisler (July 19, 1925 – April 7, 1993) was a former Democratic member of the Pennsylvania House of Representatives.

== Early life ==
He was born and raised by Adam Alexander Geisler (1898-1974) and Margaret Geisler (1898-1971) and had 8 siblings in total counting him. His family is of Austrian descent.

== Military and Political Background ==
He enrolled into Langley High School and attended Duquesne University. After he graduated he was drafted into the United States Air Force and served in World War II. In 1947 he became an auditor for the city of Pittsburgh and ended his service in 1952. During the 1969 house election, he ran for the democrat side and ultimately won the race. He became a member of the 27th district of Pennsylvania house of representatives starting from that year and ended his term in 1978.

== Death ==
In the early hours of April 7, 1993, Robert had died from a sudden heart attack. He was only 67 years old. Robert is survived through his wife and two daughters.
