= Cornelis de Man =

Dutch painter (1621–1706)

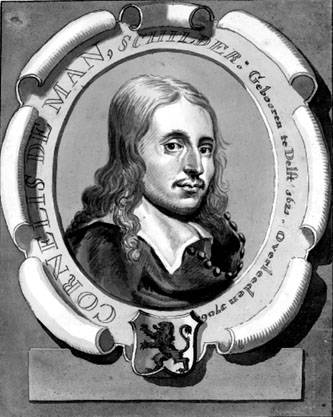
Drawing of Cornelis de Man by Jelgersma (special Collections Leiden University Library)

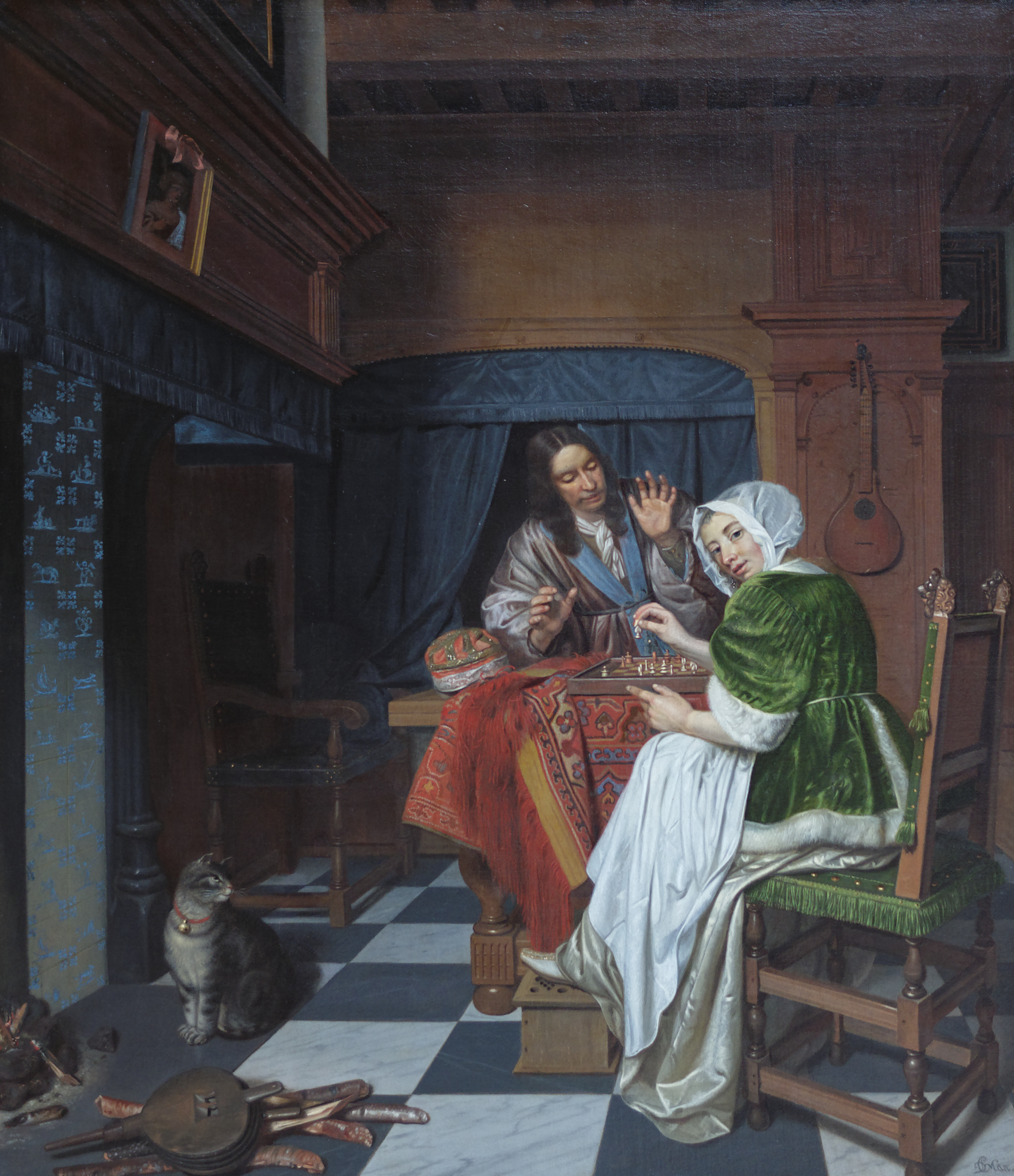
The Chess Players. Museum of Fine Arts (Budapest)

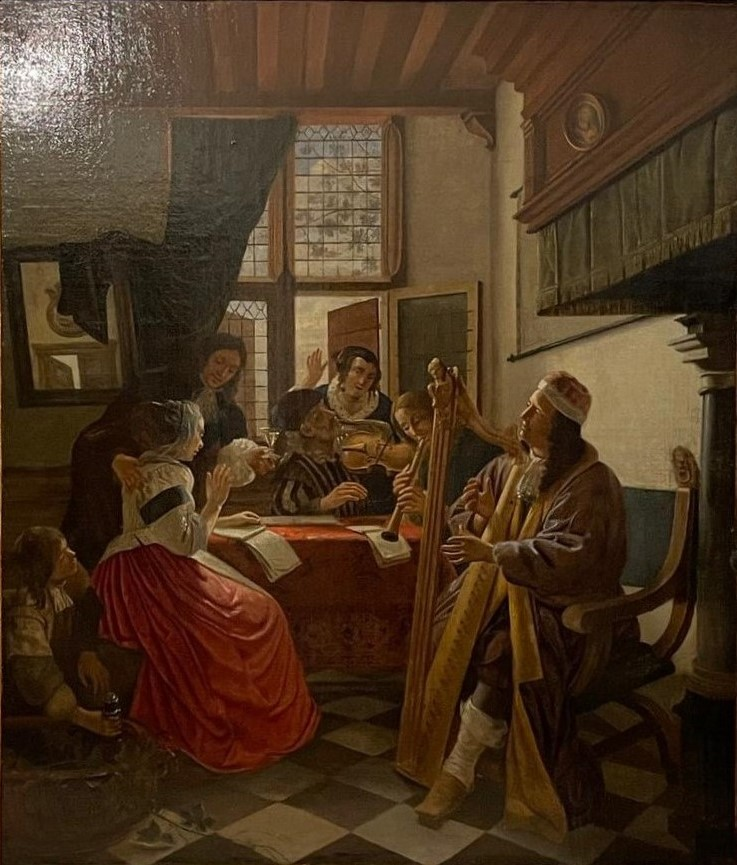
Musical Company in an Interior, Delft, c. 1670, private collection

Cornelis de Man (1 July 1621, in Delft – 1 September 1706, in Delft) was a Dutch Golden Age painter.

== Biography ==
As a young man, Kornelis was not satisfied with life in Delft. He wanted to travel beyond the port of Dordrecht and that is what he did, spending a year in Paris as soon as he came of age and had enough talent to pay his way with his painting skills.

According to the RKD (Netherlands Institute for Art History) he became a member of the Delft Guild of St. Luke in 1642 and ultimately travelled to Italy. He was well-received in Paris at the outset of his travels, but set off in the Spring for Lyon in order to cross Lombardia and the mountains before another winter set in. He settled for two years in Florence, where he had a rich patron, but finally stayed the longest in Rome. On the way back home he stopped in Venice, and in the end was gone for a total of nine years.

He was back in 1653 and stayed in Delft, where he created genre works that are reckoned to be "of the "Pieter de Hooch" school.

== Career in Delft ==
He became a successful painter in Delft, painting a prestigious group portrait for the Anatomy guild there, as well as a renowned painting for the Amsterdam Noordsche Compagnie, a northern branch of the Amsterdam Dutch East India Company. This unusual painting was a studio reconstruction of the factory in Spitsbergen, based on a Danish original. He added all sorts of arctic details to this painting, though he never traveled further north than Denmark.

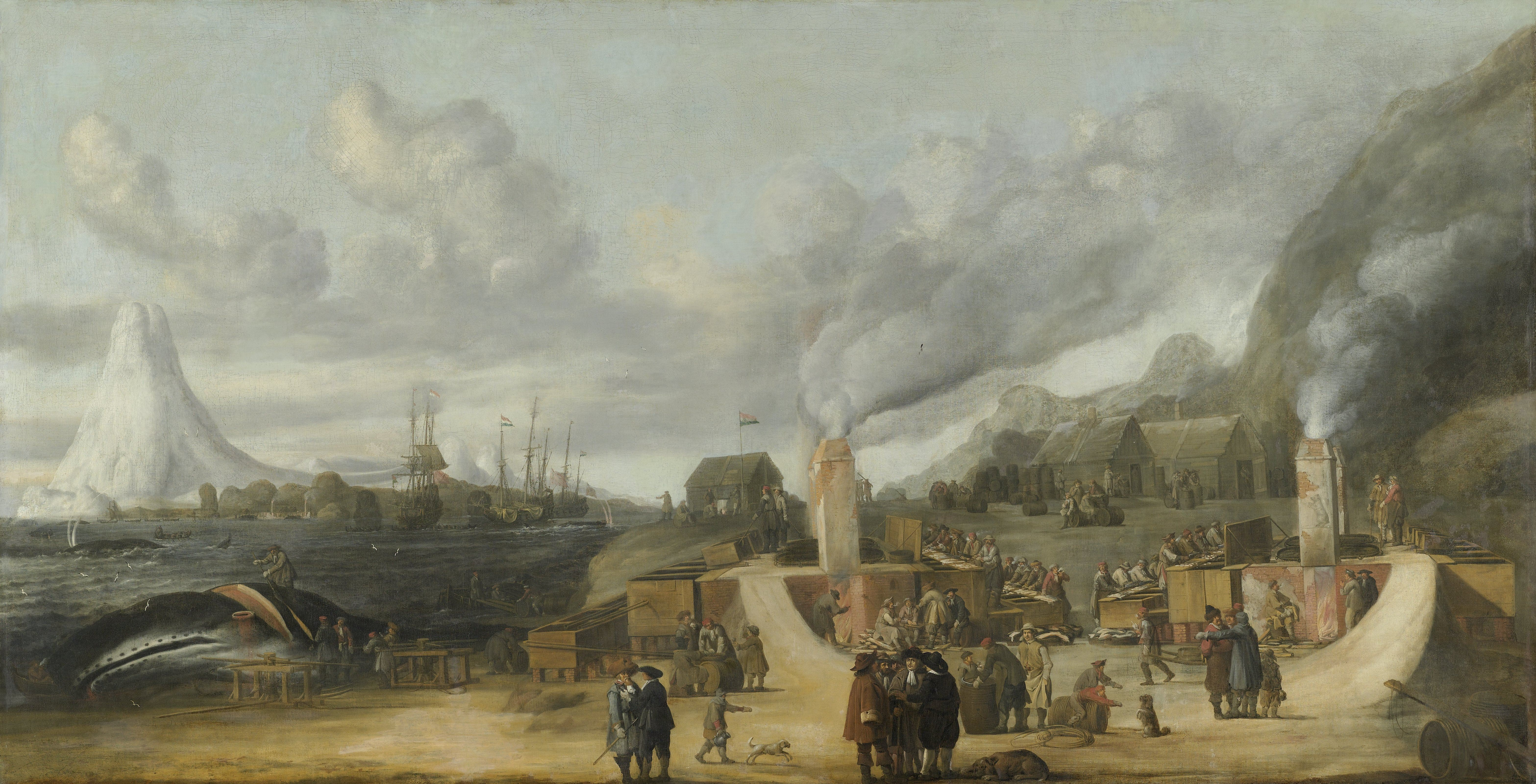
The whale-oil factory of the Amsterdam chamber of the Noordsche Compagnie at Smeerenburg. 1639. Amsterdam, Rijksmuseum Amsterdam.
