= Chinese chess (disambiguation) =

Chinese chess primarily refers to xiangqi, a two-player Chinese game in a family of strategic board games of which Western chess, Indian chaturanga, Japanese shogi, and the more similar Korean janggi are also members. This may also refer to:

- Chess in China (international, western, chess)
- Chinese Chess Association

== See also ==
- Chinese checkers
- Wei qi (Go)
- Chess (disambiguation)
