= The Chess Players (Daumier) =

Painting by Honoré Daumier

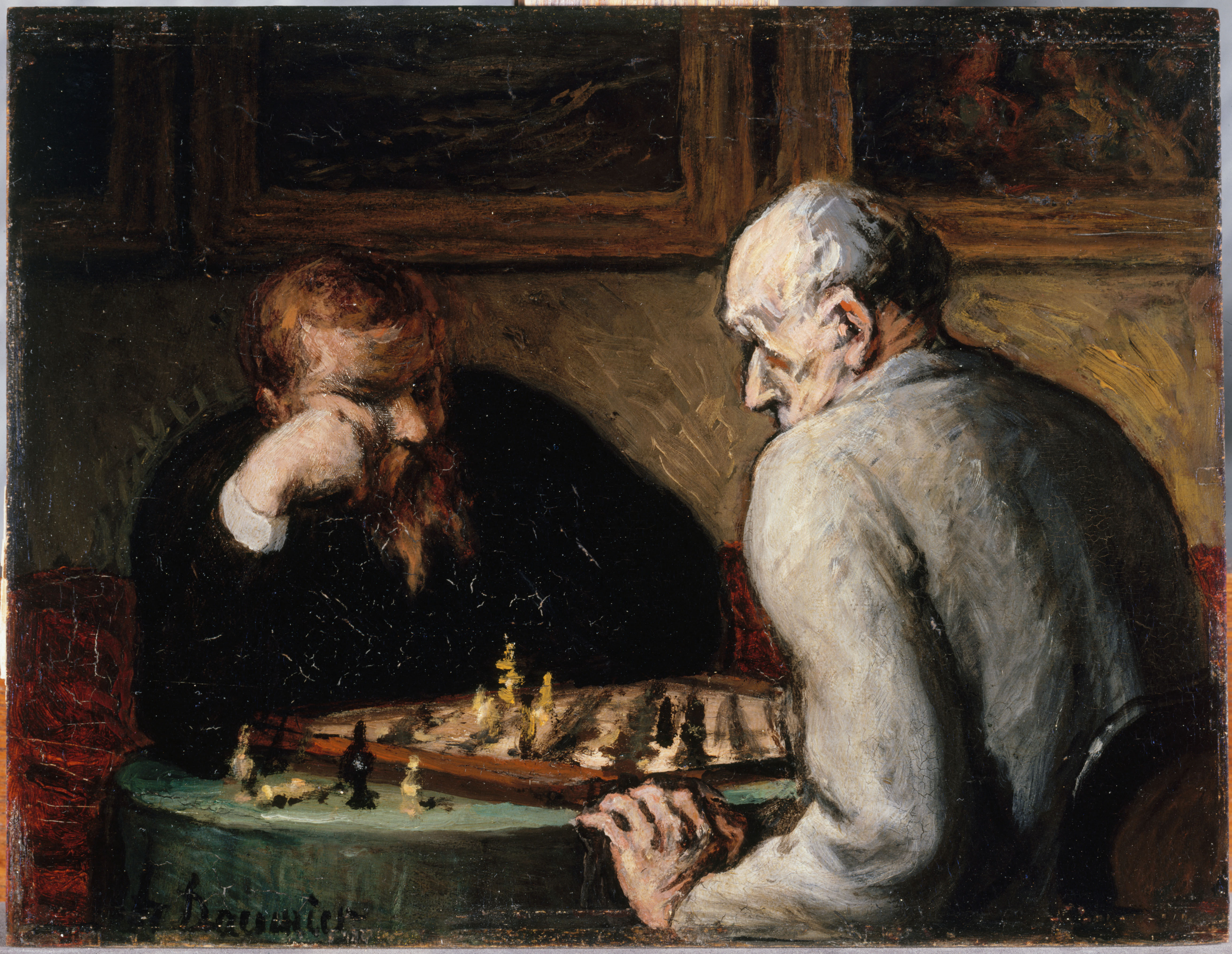
- Artist: Honoré Daumier
- Year: c. 1863–1867
- Medium: oil on wood
- Dimensions: 24.8 cm × 32 cm (9.8 in × 13 in)
- Location: Petit Palais, Paris

The Chess Players is an oil-on-wood painting by the French artist Honoré Daumier, created in the 1860s. It is part of the collection of the Petit Palais, in Paris.

== History ==
The exact date of creation of the painting is unknown, but it has been ascribed dates between 1863 and 1867. At the lower left is the signature of the artist, "h Daumier". In the catalog of the artist's works, the painting is listed as DR Number 7168.

A replica formerly in the Thannhauser collection in Munich (listed as DR Number 8031) is known from an old photograph; its medium and present whereabouts are unknown.

== Description ==
In a dimly lit room, two chess players of different ages are playing chess. The younger man's relaxed appearance suggests that he may be winning, while the older man's tense grip of the table edge suggests that his game is going poorly.

Daumier matched the colors of the chess players' clothing with the color of the chess pieces; the white suit of one character opposed to the black sweater of his opponent. The contrast of light and shadow enhances the drama of the scene.

The art historian Robert Rey suggests that Daumier never had enough time to become proficient at the games of dominoes, chess or cards, and to practice these games regularly, due to his rigid commitment to producing lithographs. However, in his work there are a large number of lithographs and several paintings in which these games are depicted, which seems to attest a pronounced interest in them.

== Analysis ==
Daumier at the time of the creation of this canvas had already begun to lose his sight; the faces of his chess players are grotesque, exaggerated, deliberately roughly drawn; the work is even close to the work of the Impressionists.

The artist often used theatrical motifs in his work. Daumier freely adapted for his needs the images created by the actors on stage, transferred them to the space of his paintings. In this painting there is also some simulated theatricality of images. The faces of the characters are close to masks. Such a mask, ritual or theatrical, is built according to the laws of the grotesque and hyperbole. At the same time, the artist deliberately minimizes individual facial features. Art historians often compare his paintings to the features of the Italian theater Commedia dell'arte.

== Provenance ==
The painting was in the private collection of Eugène Jacquette, in Paris, until 1899. The same year, the painting was donated to the Museum of Fine Arts of the city of Paris, located in the Petit Palais, where it still hangs. The picture has repeatedly represented the artist's work at foreign exhibitions.
