= Sammie Chess, Jr. =

North Carolina judge and lawyer

Sammie Chess, Jr. (28 March 1934 – 23 July 2022) was an attorney, civil rights activist, and judge in North Carolina. He was the first Black Superior Court justice in North Carolina history.

Chess graduated from the North Carolina College for Negroes (now North Carolina Central University), then attended its law school, graduating with his J.D. in 1958. He went into private practice in High Point, NC, and was a prominent attorney in the civil rights era, arguing thousands of cases on behalf of largely Black defendants in the course of protests and other civil disobedience actions.

On November 4, 1971, Chess was appointed to the North Carolina Superior Court by governor Robert Scott. He served a single term on the Superior Court before stepping down and returning to the private practice of law in High Point.

In 1991, Chess accepted an appointment as a North Carolina Administrative Law Judge, a position he held until 2007.

Chess was a mentor to many North Carolina jurists, including prominent District Court justice Orlando F. Hudson Jr.

== Early life ==
Sammie Chess, Jr. was born on March 28, 1934, in the Bull Pond community near Allendale, South Carolina, to Sammie Chess, Sr. (1911–1994) and Susanna Hagood Chess (1913–2012). The family farmed land that had come down to them from Chess's great-grandfather W.J. Baxter, who had bought a plot of at least ten acres in 1900.

In 1943, Chess's father moved the family to Harlem, NY during the Great Migration. Chess Sr. worked there as a longshoreman, hauling iron, and Chess's mother Susanna worked in a button factory. In 1946, Chess's parents separated, and he moved with his mother back to the South, to High Point. There, he attended William Penn High School, which at the time was all-Black. Chess dropped out of school, believing that it would confer no advantages on him, but his principal, Samuel E. Burford, persuaded him to return. Burford further urged Chess to apply to college, despite Chess's belief that college was beyond his reach. At Burford's urging, Chess applied to the North Carolina College for Negroes (now North Carolina Central University), an HBCU, in the fall of 1952.

== College and law school ==
Burford had persuaded Chess that it would be feasible to work his way through college. Chess held various jobs at NCCN, beginning with a position scrubbing the cafeteria floor, and ending as a campus representative for Philip Morris by his first year in law school – a job sufficient to pay his room, board, and tuition. He entered the NCCN law school in 1955, after his junior year, under the law schools' early admission program. He completed his undergraduate work in June 1956, and his Juris Doctor degree two years later. He passed the North Carolina bar exam in August, 1958.

== Career ==
=== Military service and early law practice ===
After law school, Chess responded to the draft and entered the US armed forces, spending thirteen months in South Korea. After his service, Chess returned to High Point, where he had lived with his mother before entering college, and opened his own law practice there in 1960. Albert L. Turner, Dean of the NCCN law school and the first Black law school dean in the U.S., had urged Chess to practice law in Cleveland, Ohio, for Turner's own firm. Instead, Chess returned to High Point to practice law where he had grown up.

During a time of increasing civil rights activities, Chess often advocated for Black citizens engaged in acts of civil disobedience, such as sit-ins. In 1963, in the wake of a series of anti-segregation demonstrations in High Point, some marked by attacks on Black protesters, Chess defended seven Black demonstrators who sat on a sidewalk outside a High Point cafeteria. Initially convicted of trespassing, the protestors were acquitted on Chess' successful appeal to the Superior Court. In 1964, as a cooperating attorney for the NAACP Legal Defense Fund, he represented an NAACP chapter in a suit against the hospital in Thomasville, North Carolina, pressing for "full integration of all facilities". Chess later estimated he had argued some three thousand of such civil rights actions, often for little or no compensation.

Chess also met twice with Martin Luther King along with other attorneys as King worked to develop a cohort of Black attorneys who could successfully argue civil rights cases, especially at the local level.

=== The fight for integrated schools in High Point ===
The struggle to integrate schools was a particular hallmark of Chess's career as a civil rights attorney. In 1954, the Supreme Court had ruled, in Brown v. Board of Education, that "separate but equal" schooling facilities were unconstitutional. In North Carolina, as elsewhere, the implementation of Brown was slow and often grudging. Individual districts were brought into compliance one legal action at a time. In 1963, Chess brought suit against the High Point school district, challenging the district's progress on desegregation. Under a new plan, Black students were afforded some rights to transfer to majority-White schools, but Chess and others needed to maintain pressure over several years.

=== Griggs v. Duke Power and other landmark civil rights cases ===
Chess was one of the key attorneys who brought the landmark civil rights case Griggs v. Duke Power Co. before the U.S. Supreme Court in 1970. The case concerned Duke Power's practice, at its Dan River Steam Station in North Carolina, of using a "cognitive ability" test to determine which employees lacking high-school diplomas (as many Black workers did at the time) would be allowed to transfer to higher-paying departments. Such tests favored White over Black test-takers by a nearly 10:1 ratio. The Supreme Court ruled that under Title VII of the Civil Rights Act of 1964, if such tests disparately impact ethnic minority groups, businesses must demonstrate that such tests are "reasonably related" to the job for which the test is required.

Chess argued similar cases before courts lower than the Supreme Court, including Robinson v. Lorillard Co., a case that, like Griggs, challenged discriminatory barriers to workplace advancement, and awarded attorney fees to the plaintiffs as well, and Addison v. High Point Hospital, which challenged High Point Hospital's practice of segregating Black mothers and their newborns into a single ward in the hospital, as well as forcing Black hospital staff to dine separately from their White counterparts.

Chess worked on Griggs and Lorillard alongside notable Black attorney and civil rights advocate Julius L. Chambers.

=== Superior Court judge ===
On November 4, 1971, Chess was appointed to the North Carolina Superior Court by governor Robert Scott, making him the first Black judge of the North Carolina Superior Court. Chess had previously been a trustee of Winston-Salem State University and thus on the State Board of Higher Education, which was chaired by Scott. Scott had formed a personal bond with Chess from their shared work on the Board, and was also under pressure from other prominent Black North Carolina lawyers to appoint a Black candidate to the Superior Court. The group offered the governor a list of six possible nominees, including Chess.

Fred Morrison, who knew Governor Scott very well, believes strongly that the primary motivation for Governor Scott appointing Judge Chess was because the governor thought it was the right thing to do. Morrison points to the fact that Governor Scott appointed John Baker Jr. as the first African American to serve on the North Carolina Board of Paroles on June 10, 1971. Also on July 8, 1972, he appointed James M. Paige to serve as the first African American Commissioner of Youth Development.

Chess returned to the private practice of law between 1975 and 1991 after serving a single four-year term on the Superior Court.

=== Administrative law judge ===
In 1991, Chess accepted appointment as an Administrative Law Judge in the North Carolina Office of Administrative Hearings. The OAH has oversight of litigation pertaining to special education, civil rights discrimination, state employee grievances, appeals of regulatory decisions, and the rules-making process for state agencies. Chess held this role for sixteen years, retiring from the position and from the active practice of law in 2007.

== Legacy ==
Chess was a mentor to many North Carolina attorney and judges. One of his notable protegés is retired Superior Court justice Orlando F Hudson, Jr.

== Bibliography ==
- Webster, Joe L. (2017). The Making and Measure of a Judge: Biography of the Honorable Sammie Chess, Jr. Chapel Hill, N.C.: The Chapel Hill Press. ISBN 978-1-59715-153-5.
