= Pittsburgh Water =

Agency overview
- Formed: 17 February 1984
- Jurisdiction: City of Pittsburgh
- Employees: 244 (as of Dec 2016)
- Agency executive: Will Pickering, Chief Executive Officer
- Website: http://www.pgh2o.com/

Pittsburgh Water, formerly the Pittsburgh Water and Sewer Authority (PWSA), is a municipal authority in Pittsburgh, Pennsylvania. It is responsible for water treatment and delivery systems in the city of Pittsburgh, as well as the city's sewer system. In a 2010 report, the authority reported 80,557 drinking water service connections and 107,151 sewage connections. The authority claims to serve approximately 83,000 customers.

It is estimated that there are 930 miles of water lines and 7,300 Fire Hydrants served by Pittsburgh Water.

== History ==
The Pittsburgh Water and Sewer Authority was created in 1984 to oversee a $200 million capital improvement program focused on Pittsburgh's water treatment and distribution system. This capital improvement program was primarily designed to ensure that the water system would meet various new requirements mandated by federal and state laws pertaining to safe drinking water.

The largest project undertaken in the initial years of the PWSA was to cover all open water reservoirs, replace them with closed tanks, or else enact another acceptable solution, such as the installation of a membrane filtration plant at the open Highland Reservoir No. 1, which is the focal point of Highland Park.

The City of Pittsburgh Water Department was absorbed by the PWSA in 1995, and in 1999, the PWSA also assumed the responsibility of operating and maintaining Pittsburgh's sewer system. In November 2024, the PWSA rebranded as Pittsburgh Water.

== System statistics ==
- Water Treatment Plants: 1
- Pump Stations: 11
- Total Miles of Water Lines: 964
- Fire Hydrants: 7,462
- Total Miles of Sewer Lines: 1,211
- Catch Basins (Storm Drains): 24,548

== Current Projects ==
As of November 2024 and since June 2016, Pittsburgh Water has been working to replace lead service lines. These lines had been built with lead because it was a readily available material and was easy to work with. However, exposure to lead is directly connected with multiple health problems, particularly in children. No lead is present in water that has been treated by Pittsburgh Water; lead only enters water through older service lines as it travels to buildings. Pittsburgh Water has been working in conjunction with local home and business owners to replace these pipes. A more comprehensive and frequently-updated list of current projects may be found on Pittsburgh Water's main website. Projects conducted by Pittsburgh Water typically involve updating older plumbing systems, building new lines, and creating greener solutions to stormwater issues such as parks.

== See also ==
- Pennsylvania-American Water Company, which also serves Pittsburgh
