= The Chess Players (de Mans painting) =

Painting by Cornelis de Man

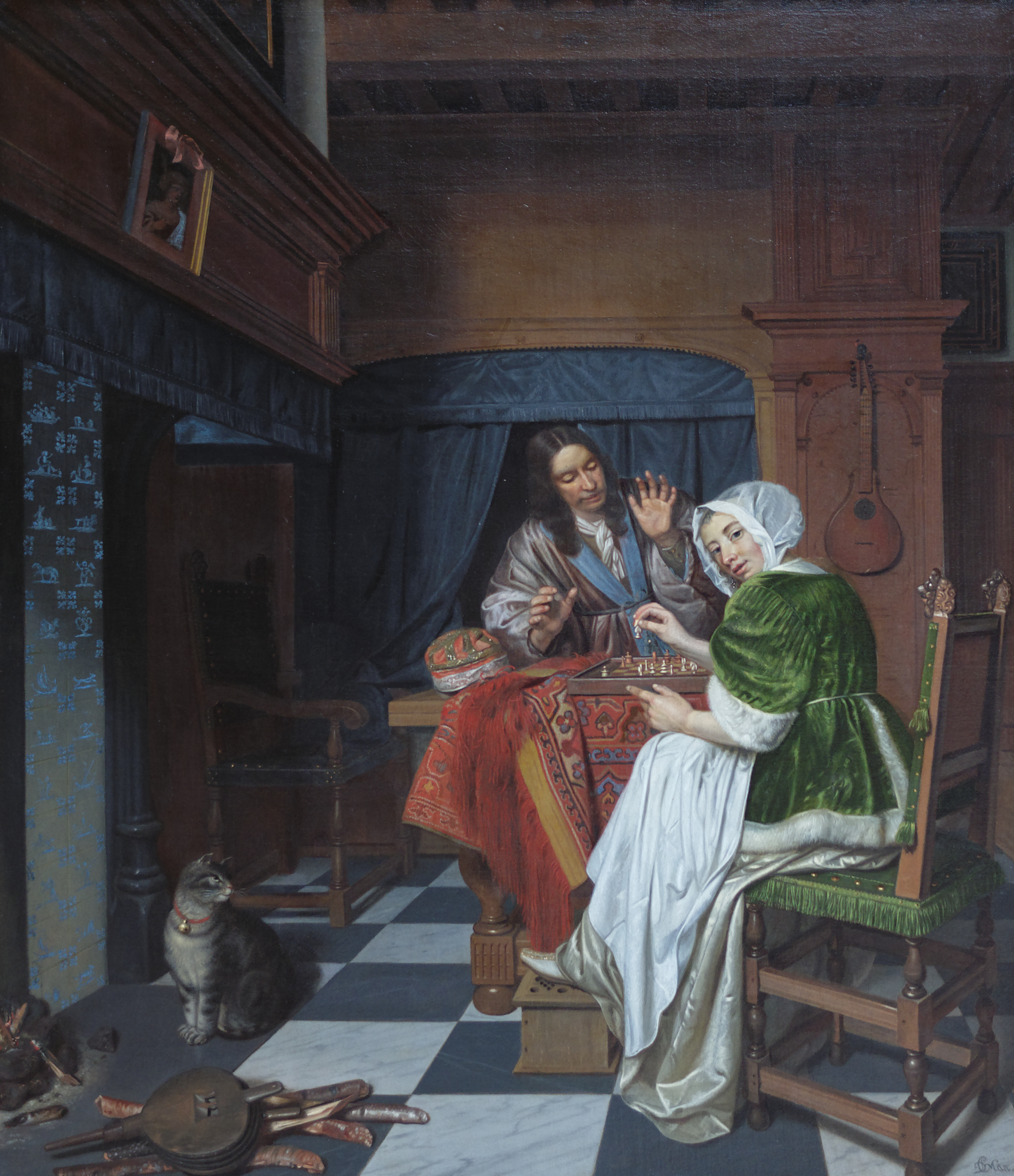
The Chess Players (c. 1670) by Cornelis de Man

The Chess Players is an oil on canvas painting by Cornelis de Man, created c. 1670, now in the Museum of Fine Arts in Budapest, Hungary as Inventory Number 320. It entered the collection in 1871.
