= Army CHESS =

Main Provider Of IT Solutions

- Founded: 1996
- Website: https://chess.army.mil

Army CHESS (Computer Hardware Enterprise Software and Solutions) is the main provider of commercial enterprise information technology (IT) solutions, computer software, and hardware for the United States Army. CHESS allows authorized U.S. Army and other Federal Agency commissioners to easily procure a wide array of IT hardware and services through various contracting vessels.

CHESS allows users to acquire a variety of IT solutions through specific contract vehicles. This consolidates purchases of IT products for the U.S. Army.

In 2005, CHESS introduced the Consolidated Buy (CB) program. This allowed the Army to offer IT solutions at a lower cost, through a large quantity purchasing strategy. It allows end users to purchase CHESS-approved hardware and services at the same rate. In 2010, CHESS is reported to have helped the Army generate a cost avoidance of $724 million.

== See also ==
- Marine Corps Common Hardware Suite
