= Richard Chess (poet) =

American poet

Richard Chess (born 1953 in Los Angeles) is an American poet. He spent most of his childhood and youth in Cherry Hill, New Jersey. He is the author of four books of poetry, Love Nailed to the Doorpost (2017), Third Temple (2007), Chair in the Desert (2000) and Tekiah (1994). His poems have appeared in many journals as well as several anthologies, including Best American Spiritual Writing 2005 and Telling and Remembering: A Century of American-Jewish Poetry. He is a regular contributor to "Good Letters", the blog hosted by the magazine Image.

He is professor of literature and language at the University of North Carolina at Asheville, where he directs the Center for Jewish Studies and the creative writing program. He has been a member of the low-residency MFA faculties at Warren Wilson College and Queens College. He was for a number of years writer-in-residence at the Brandeis Bardin Institute in Simi Valley, California. He has also been an assistant director of The Jewish Arts Institute at Elat Chayyim, located at the Isabella Freedman Retreat Center and for two years was the poetry editor of Zeek: A Jewish Journal of Thought and Culture.

He is one of the leaders of UNC Asheville's contemplative inquiry initiative. Among other accomplishments of that initiative is the annual Creating a Mindful Campus retreat/conference. He has been active in a variety of ways with the Center for Contemplative Mind and its Association for Contemplative Mind in Higher Education.

He lives in Asheville with his wife, Laurie.
