= Richard B. Chess =

American politician

Member of the Pennsylvania House of Representatives from the 27th district
- In office 1979–1980
- Preceded by: Robert A. Geisler
- Succeeded by: Thomas C. Petrone

Personal details
- Born: December 20, 1953 (age 72) Pennsylvania, U.S.
- Party: Democratic

Richard Bruce Chess (born December 20, 1953, Pennsylvania) is an American lawyer and politician who was a Democratic member of the Pennsylvania House of Representatives in 1979-1980. Since leaving political office, he has worked as an attorney specializing in real estate law in Richmond, Virginia. He currently has his own law firm in that city.

== Life and career ==
The son of George Findley Chess and Mary Danyla, Richard "Rick" Bruce Chess was born in Pennsylvania on December 20, 1953. He was raised in Pittsburgh, Pennsylvania and graduated from both Langley High School and the University of Pittsburgh. He earned a Juris Doctor degree from the University of Richmond School of Law in 1976. He served in the United States Marines, and then worked as a local government attorney in Pittsburgh. In 1977 he was head of Allegheny County's Consumer Affairs office, and in 1978 he was appointed head of Allegheny County's Bureau of Weights and Measures.

In 1974 he was a Democratic Party candidate for the Pennsylvania House of Representatives, District 27 which he lost in the primary election to Robert Geisler. He lost to Geisler again in the 1976 election for the same office but won the election for that position in the November 1978 election. During his two year tenure he served on the House Agriculture Committee.

In 1980, at the age of 26, Chess ran against Bob Casey Sr. for the post of Treasurer of Pennsylvania; a decision which angered the Democratic Party in Allegheny County and ultimately led to the party withdrawing there future support for re-election in the House of Representative. In 1981 he married Diane Dolan in Richmond, Virginia. At that time he was vice president of the Metropolitan Richmond Chamber of Commerce and executive director of the Virginia State Chamber of Commerce's Private Industry Council. He had previously served as the president of the Local Government Attorneys of Virginia. In 1984 he was elected vice president of the Richmond Community Action Program.

In 1985 he announced his candidacy for Virginia's 71st House of Delegates district to replace Benjamin Lambert who left his post after winning a seat in the Virginia Senate. He ran as an independent, and lost to Jean Wooden Cunningham. After this he worked as a lawyer in Richmond and as both vice president and acquisitions director for the United Dominion Realty Trust (UDRT). In 1993 he moved to Midlothian, Virginia. In 1997 he announced his candidacy for the post of director of the James River Soil and Water Conservation District; an election he lost. In 1998 he left his post at UDRT to become director of institutional services in the Richmond division of the law firm of Goodman Segar Hogan Hoffler. In 2000 he joined the legal team of the broadband company Winstar Communications. In 2008 he was president of the Richmond Association for Business Economics, and in 2009 he served as president of the American Realty Capital Markets LLC.
