= Shatar =

Chess variants

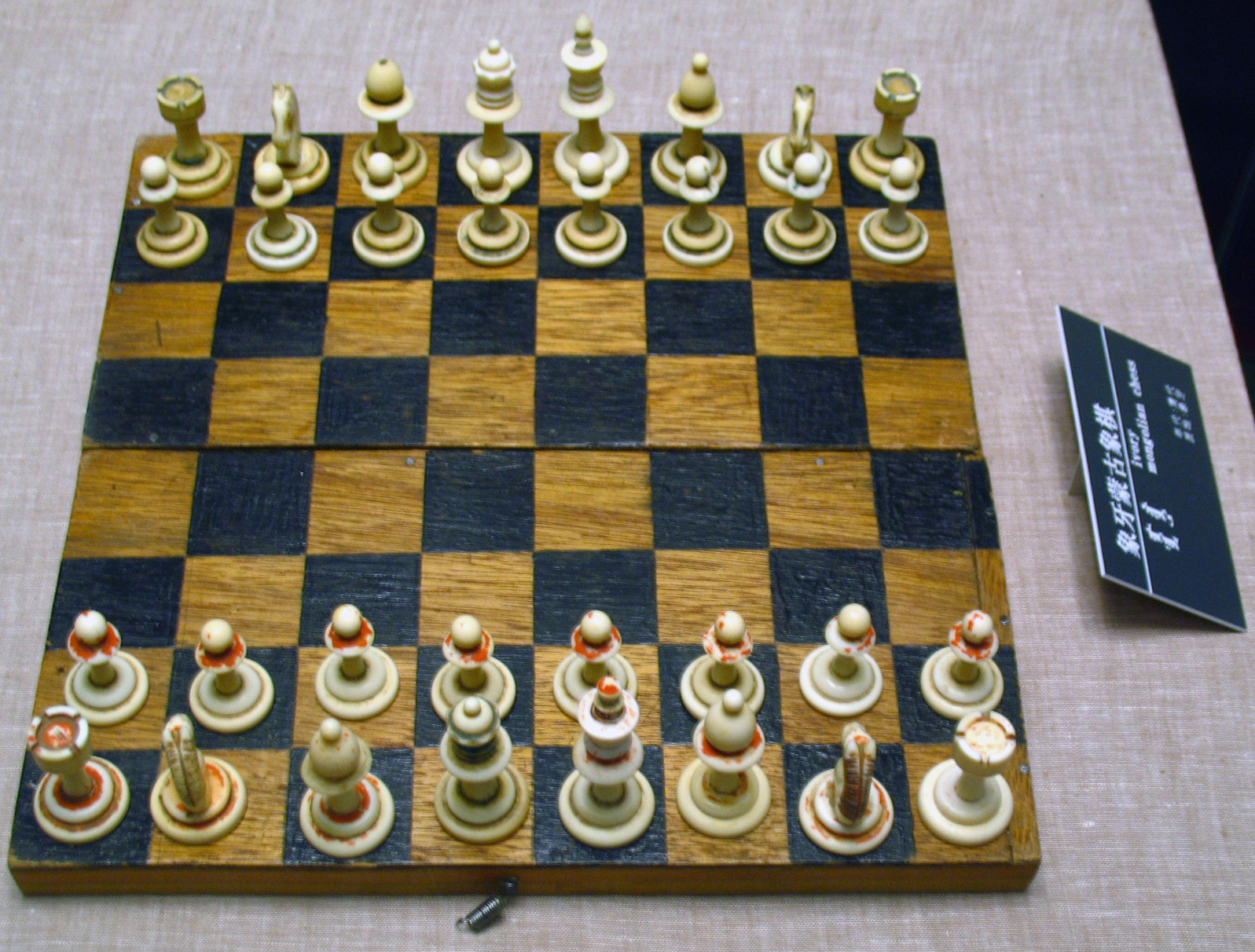
Ivory shatar displayed in Hulunbuir National Museum

Shatar (Mongolian: ᠮᠣᠩᠭᠣᠯ ᠰᠢᠲᠠᠷ᠎ᠠ Monggol sitar-a, "Mongolian shatranj"; a.k.a. shatar) and hiashatar are two chess variants played in Mongolia.

== Pieces ==
The design of the Shatar pieces are very distinctly different from Western chess pieces:

Name	Meaning	Equivalent
Nojon (Noyion)	Lord, Chief, Prince	King
Bers	Snow panther	Queen
Temee	Camel	Bishop
Mor' (Mori)	Horse	Knight
Tereg (Terghe)	Cart	Rook
Xüü (Huu)	Child	Pawn

== Game rules ==
The rules are similar to standard chess; the differences being that:

- The noyan (ᠨᠣᠶᠠᠨ, lord) does not castle.
- The küü (ᠬᠦᠦ, pawn) does not have an initial double-step move option, except for the queen pawn or king pawn.
  - In old shatar rules, a pawn that reaches its eighth rank must promote to half-power tiger. But a pawn could step back to its sixth rank to promote to all-power tiger. It moves like a queen.
- The baras (ᠪᠠᠷᠰ or ᠪᠠᠷᠠᠰ, tiger; Persian: fers) moves like a promoted rook in shogi: like a chess rook or one square diagonally. It was called half-power tiger or half-power lion in old shatar rules.
  - In modern shatar rules, a baras moves like a queen.
- The mori (knight; ᠮᠣᠷᠢ) cannot deliver mate.
  - In modern shatar rules, the mori can give mate.
- The bishop (teme) and rook (terge) move as they do in standard chess.
- The game always starts by White playing 1.d4 and Black responding with 1...d5. This is the only time in the game a pawn may advance two squares; some sources claim this initial move can optionally be made with the e-pawn.
  - In old shatar rules, an Ujimqin player must make an initial double-step move with the queen pawn; a Chahar must do the same with the king pawn.
- In old shatar rules, baremate (one player having only a King remaining) is draw.
- In old shatar rules, one special rule is called tuuxəi, like komi in Go. A player could leave the enemy with only two pieces remaining (noyan and another piece) at the end. Then he must start making checks using the terge or baras and make consecutive checks until checkmate. Before checkmate, number of consecutive checks is the number of tuuxəi. If a player wins by checkmate as in chess, he receives only one tuuxəi. A player usually leaves the enemy with one noyan and one küü to allow time to put his pieces into good positions for making consecutive checks.

== Hiashatar ==
Hiashatar board

Position: A10 black rook, B10 black knight, C10 black bishop, D10 black hia, E10 black king, F10 black queen, G10 black hia, H10 black bishop, I10 black knight, J10 black rook, A9 black pawn, B9 black pawn, C9 black pawn, D9 black pawn, E9 black pawn, F9 black pawn, G9 black pawn, H9 black pawn, I9 black pawn, J9 black pawn, A2 white pawn, B2 white pawn, C2 white pawn, D2 white pawn, E2 white pawn, F2 white pawn, G2 white pawn, H2 white pawn, I2 white pawn, J2 white pawn, A1 white rook, B1 white knight, C1 white bishop, D1 white hia, E1 white king, F1 white queen, G1 white hia, H1 white bishop, I1 white knight, J1 white rook

Hiashatar is a medieval chess variant played in Mongolia that is not as popular as shatar. The game is played on a 10×10 board. The pieces are the same as in shatar with the following exceptions:

- The baras moves the same as a Queen in standard chess.
- Pawns may move 1–3 step(s) on their first move.
- An additional piece called the bodyguard, which moves like a queen, but only one or two squares. The bodyguard has a special power: any piece sliding through any square a king's move away from the bodyguard must stop its move. Any piece a king's move away from the bodyguard can move only one square.
