= Cathedral of Learning =

Building at the University of Pittsburgh

- U.S. National Register of Historic Places
- U.S. Historic district – Contributing property
- City of Pittsburgh Historic Structure
- Pittsburgh Landmark – PHLF
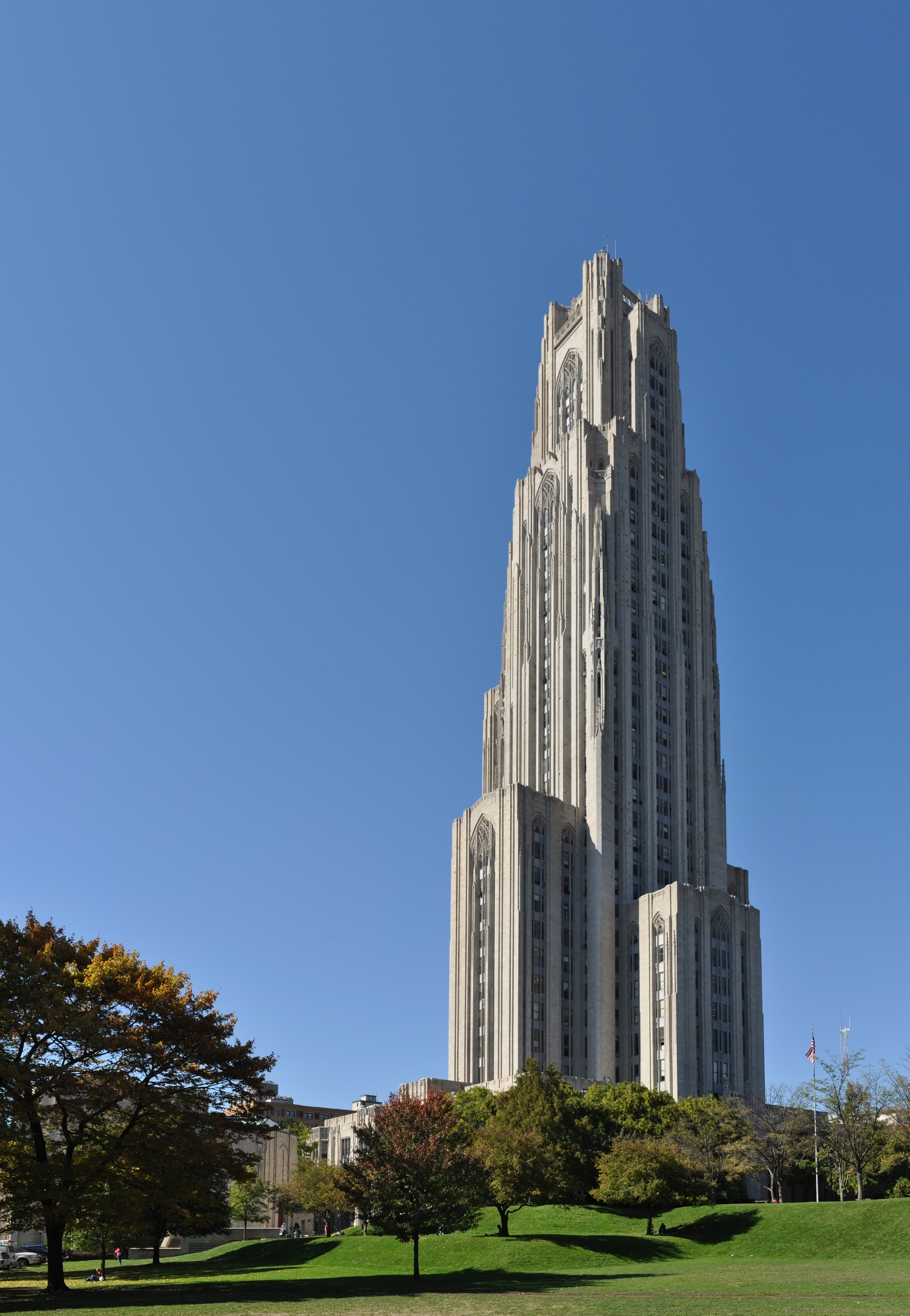
- The Cathedral of Learning at the University of Pittsburgh

- Location within Pittsburgh Location within Pennsylvania Location within the United States
- Location: Pittsburgh, Pennsylvania, USA
- Coordinates: 40°26′39″N 79°57′11″W
- Built: 1926; 100 years ago
- Architect: Charles Klauder
- Architectural style: Late Gothic Revival with some Art Deco influences
- Part of: Schenley Farms Historic District (ID83002213)
- NRHP reference No.: 75001608

Significant dates
- Added to NRHP: November 3, 1975
- Designated CP: July 22, 1983
- Designated CPHS: February 22, 1977
- Designated PHLF: 1970: Croghan-Schenley Ballroom; 1972: Cathedral of Learning interiors 1973: Cathedral of Learning

The Cathedral of Learning is a 42-story skyscraper that serves as the centerpiece of the University of Pittsburgh's (Pitt) main campus in the Oakland neighborhood of Pittsburgh, Pennsylvania. Standing at 535 feet (163 m), the 42-story Late Gothic Revival structure is the tallest educational building in the Western Hemisphere and the second-tallest university building (fifth-tallest educationally purposed building) in the world, after the main building of Moscow State University. It is also the second-tallest gothic-styled building in the world, after the Woolworth Building in Manhattan. The Cathedral of Learning was commissioned in 1921 and ground was broken in 1926 under general contractor Stone & Webster. The first class was held in the building in 1931 and its exterior finished in October 1934, prior to its formal dedication in June 1937. It is a Pittsburgh landmark listed in the National Register of Historic Places.

Colloquially referred to as "Cathy" by Pitt students, the Cathedral of Learning is a steel-frame structure overlaid with Indiana limestone and contains more than 2,000 rooms and windows. It functions as a primary classroom and administrative center of the university, and is home to the Dietrich School of Arts and Sciences, the School of Social Work, and a number of its departments, as well as the Frederick Honors College. It houses multiple specialty spaces, including a studio theater, food court, study lounges, offices, computer and language labs, 31 Nationality Rooms, and a half-acre (2000 m^{2}, 22,000 ft^{2}), 4-story-high, vaulted, gothic study and event hall. The building includes noted examples of stained glass, stone, wood, and iron work and is often used by the university in photographs, postcards, and other advertisements.

== Use ==
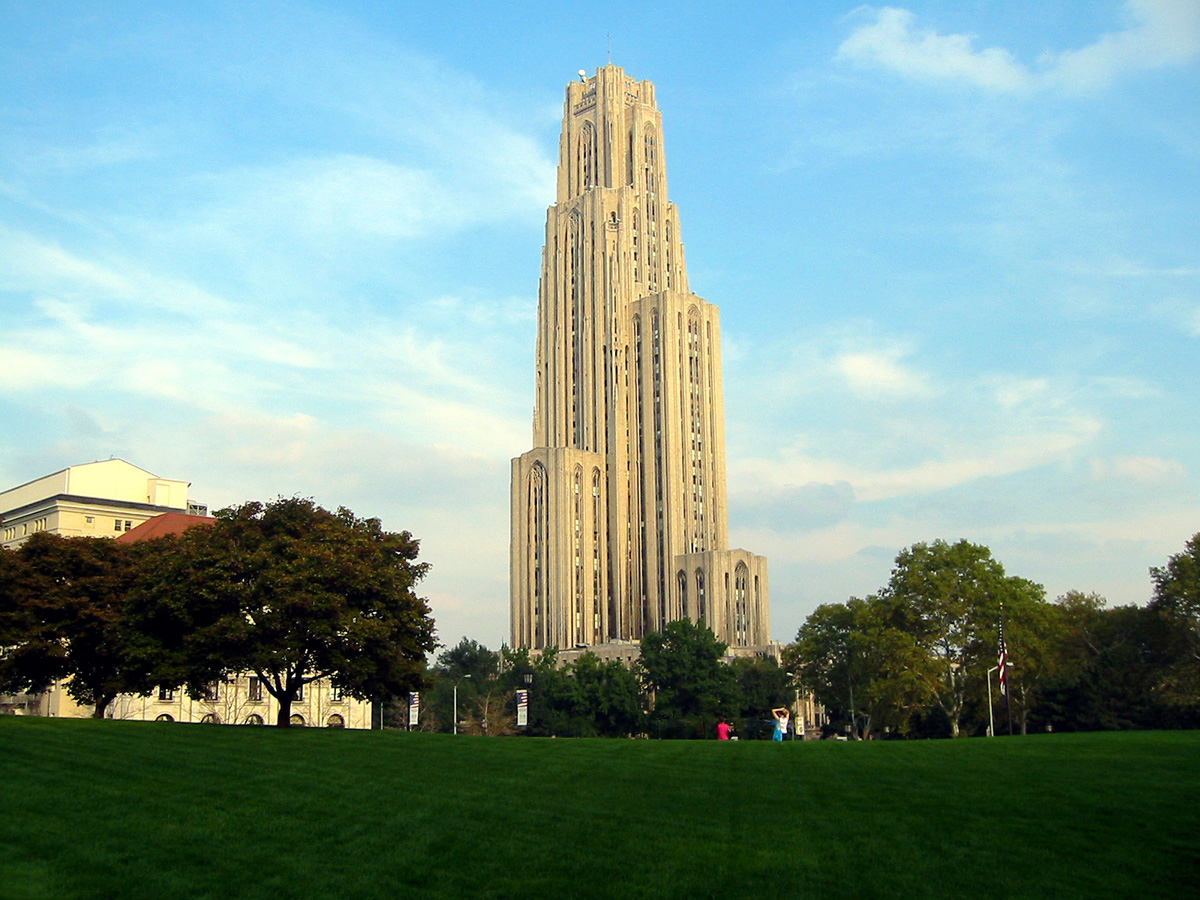
The Cathedral of Learning

The basement and floors up to (and including) floor 40 are used for educational purposes, although most floors above 36 house the building's mechanical equipment. These floors include theaters, computer laboratories, language laboratories, classrooms, and departmental offices. The basement contains a black box theater and the ground floor contains computer labs, language labs, classrooms, and the Cathedral Café food court. The lobby, comprising the first through third floors, contains a massive gothic Commons Room that is used as a general study area and for special events and is ringed by three floors of classrooms, including, on the first and third floors, the 31 Nationality Rooms designed by members of Pittsburgh's ethnic communities in the styles of different nations and ethnic groups. Twenty-nine of these serve as functional classrooms while more conventional classrooms are located on the second floor and elsewhere throughout the building. The first floor also serves as home to the offices of the Chancellor, Executive Vice Chancellor, and other administration offices, as well as the Nationality Rooms Gift Shop. The fourth floor, which was previously home to the main stacks of the university's library and the McCarl Center for Nontraditional Student Success, now houses a mix of interdisciplinary studies programs. The fifth floor originally housed the main borrowing, reference, and reading rooms of the university library, and now houses the Department of English. The Pitt Humanities Center is housed on the sixth floor. The University's Frederick Honors College is located on the 35th and 36th floors.

The Cathedral of Learning houses the Department of Philosophy, as of 2009 considered one of the top five in the United States, and the Department of History and Philosophy of Science, consistently ranked at the top of the field. Other departments in the Cathedral include English, Religious Studies, Theatre Arts, and the School of Social Work which maintains the highest classrooms in the building located on the 23rd floor. (Note: Although there are no classrooms higher than the 23rd floor, classes occasionally meet in rooms on higher floors, either temporarily (e.g., if a normal classroom is temporarily unavailable) or by consensus of the students and instructor if a class is small enough to meet in a professor's personal office or a student lounge.) Floors 38–40 are closed to the general public, as they contain electrical wiring for the building, as well as the Babcock Room, a large conference room on the 40th floor used for meetings, seminars, and special events and which provides a panoramic view of downtown Pittsburgh and the rest of the university. The 40th floor balcony also houses a nesting pair of Peregrine falcons. A view from the top is available via a webcam. Golden lights, dubbed "victory lights," surround the outside of the highest floors and are lit following Pitt football wins and other notable victories, giving the upper part of the cathedral an amber glow.

The top of the building serves as the site for the transmitter of the student-run radio station WPTS-FM as well as the amateur radio repeater W3YJ which is run by the Panther Amateur Radio club on a frequency of 443.45 MHz.

Cathedral of Learning Use and Notable Spaces by Floor

Floor	Use
Subbasement	Tunnel to Stephen Foster Memorial
Basement	Rauh Studio Theatre
Ground	Cathedral Café, Computer labs, language labs, lecture halls, Testing Center
1	Commons Room, Nationality Rooms, Crogan-Schenley Ballroom, Nationality Rooms Gift Shop, Offices of University Chancellor and Vice Chancellor
2	Commons Room, class and lecture rooms, Mulert Memorial Room
3	Commons Room, Nationality Rooms, Frick Auditorium, class and lecture rooms
4	Cultural Studies, Film Studies, and GSWS program
5	English Department, English Commons Room
6	Humanities Center
7	Office of the Chief Information Officer, IBM 360 display
8	Office of the Provost

Floor	Use
9	Dietrich School of Arts and Sciences main offices
10	Department of Philosophy
11	Center for Philosophy of Science
12	Slavic languages, Braun Room, Nationality Room and Intercultural Exchange Program office
13	Departments of Hispanic, French, and Italian languages
14	Department of Communication and William Pitt Debating Union
15	German Language, Classics
16	Department of Theater Arts
17	CFO Institutional Research office
18	Office of the Chief Financial Officer
19	Financial Information Systems
20	Center on Race and Social Problems
21	School of Social Work
22	School of Social Work offices
23	School of Social Work classrooms

Floor	Use
24	Office of University Counsel
25	Office of University Counsel, Cyber Institute of Law and Politics
26	Department of Religious Studies
27	Department of Asian Studies
28	Department of Linguistics
29	ROTC
30	Payment Processing and Financial Records
31	Financial Information Administration, Accounting Research
32	IT Business Solutions
33	Purchasing Services and Supplier Management
34	Purchasing Services
35	Frederick Honors College
36	Frederick Honors College
37	Frederick Honors College
38	Mechanical
39	Mechanical
40	Babcock Room

Refs:

== History ==
In 1921, John Gabbert Bowman became the tenth chancellor of the university. At that time, the school consisted of a series of buildings constructed along Henry Hornbostel's plan for the campus and included "temporary" wooden structures built during World War I. He then began to envision a "tall building", that would be later termed the Cathedral of Learning, to provide a dramatic symbol of education for the city and alleviate overcrowding by adding much needed space in order to meet present and future needs of the university.

His reasoning is summarized in this quote:

The building was to be more than a schoolhouse; it was to be a symbol of the life that Pittsburgh through the years had wanted to live. It was to make visible something of the spirit that was in the hearts of pioneers as, long ago, they sat in their log cabins and thought by candlelight of the great city that would sometime spread out beyond their three rivers and that even they were starting to build.

Bowman looked at a 14-acre (5.7 ha) plot of land named Frick Acres. On November 26, 1921, with aid from the Mellon family, the university was given the $2.5 million plot, and began plans for a proper university building on the site.

One of the foremost Gothic architects of the time, Philadelphian Charles Klauder, was hired to design the tower. The design took two years to finish, with the final plan attempting to fuse the idea of a modern skyscraper with the tradition and ideals of Gothic architecture. The plans received strong resistance from the community and from some university officials, who felt it was too tall for the city.

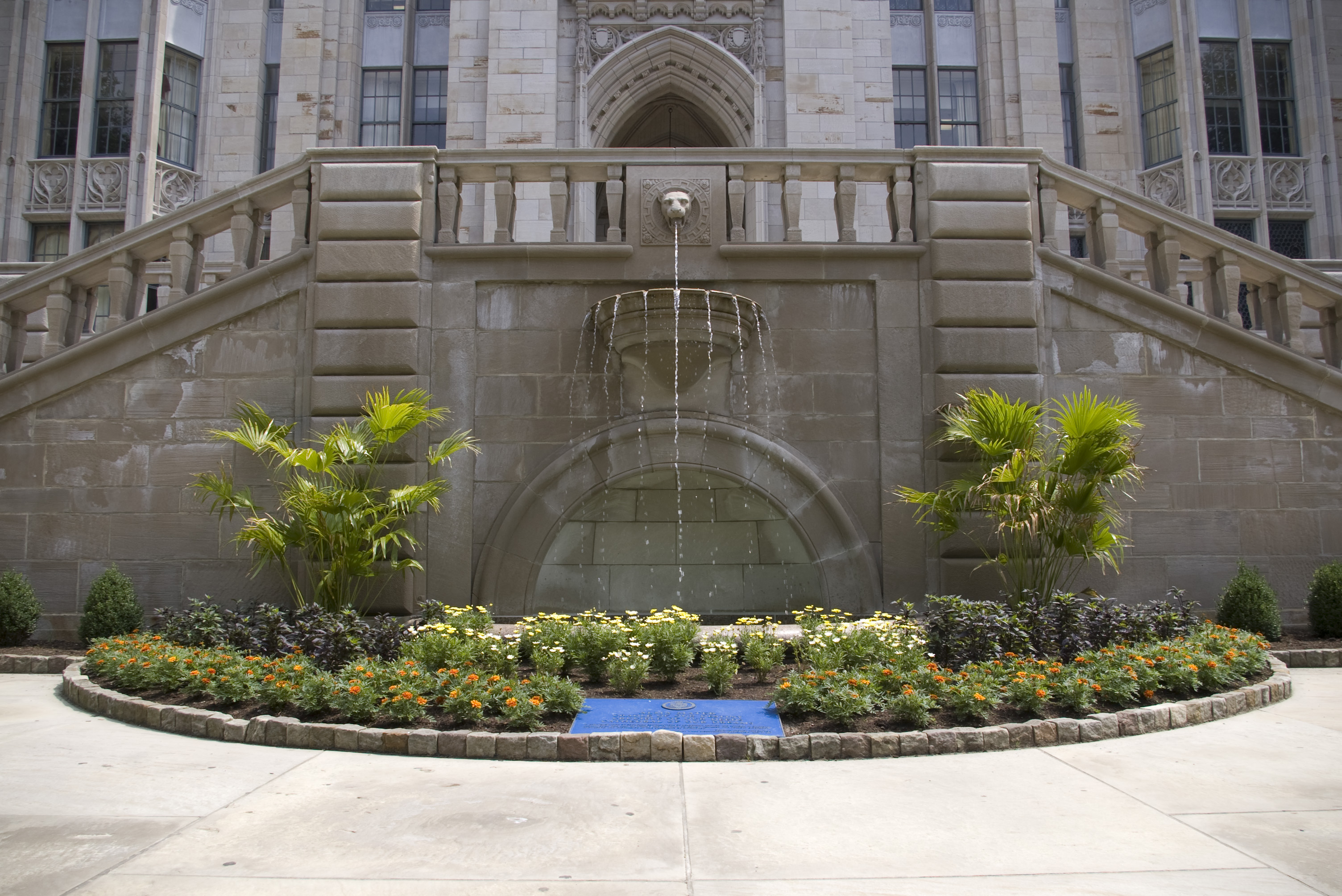
Fountain outside of the Cathedral

Local legend states that to counteract this resistance, Bowman ordered that the construction of the walls would start at the top floor and work its way down, so the project could not be canceled. This has been traced to an account on November 21, 1943, issue of At Ease, a tabloid related to local military personnel on campus, which stated that "the masonry was started from the top downward." Construction photographs show that this was not the case, and that some stonework was done on the first floor before any other stonework was begun. One engineer with the company working on the Cathedral explained that the exterior walls of the cathedral are not load-bearing. Because of this, similar buildings would start construction at the third or fourth floors. Practically, this makes sense, as it allows easy movement of building materials and equipment into and out of the building. Instead, in the cathedral's case, the issue was one of the stone that would be used in lower stories. In fact, the quarry was not prepared to deliver the stone on schedule, so construction was delayed, and work began on the higher stories.

... in the literal sense of the word, Late Gothic Revival architecture culminated in the University of Pittsburgh's skyscraping Cathedral of Learning.

— Marcus Whiffen, architecture historian

When construction started on the Cathedral of Learning in 1926, it was the tallest building in Pittsburgh, although the Gulf Tower (1932) was completed and surpassed it by the time the Cathedral of Learning was officially dedicated in June 1937. Today, it remains the tallest educational building in the Western hemisphere, the second tallest university building in the world behind the 36 story, 240 m (including a 57 m spire) Moscow State University main building completed in 1953, and the fourth tallest educational building in the world behind the Moscow State University and Mode Gakuen Cocoon (204 m) and Spiral Towers (170 m), both completed in 2008 and located in Japan.

=== World War II ===
On July 26, 1940, as World War II was starting, a bomb threat was made against the structure with extra guards being posted to secure it and the authorities not ruling out possible wartime sabotage.

During the war effort, the cathedral was assigned to house, feed and instruct roughly 1,000 of the Army Air Corps (forerunner of today's U.S. Air Force) as well as dozens of Army engineers. The building had at least 12 floors dedicated for military use from 1943 until 1945.

== Funding ==
Fundraising for this project came in a number of forms, including donations from industries, corporations, individuals and foreign governments. To raise public views of the cathedral, and at the same time finance the construction, Bowman started a fundraising campaign in 1925.

An important part of this campaign was a project reaching out to the children of the city entitled "Buy a Brick for Pitt". Each schoolchild sent a dime ($0.10) and a letter to the university, explaining how they earned the dime for the building. In exchange, the child received a certificate for one brick contained in the cathedral. A total of 97,000 certificates were issued to children.

== Commons Room ==
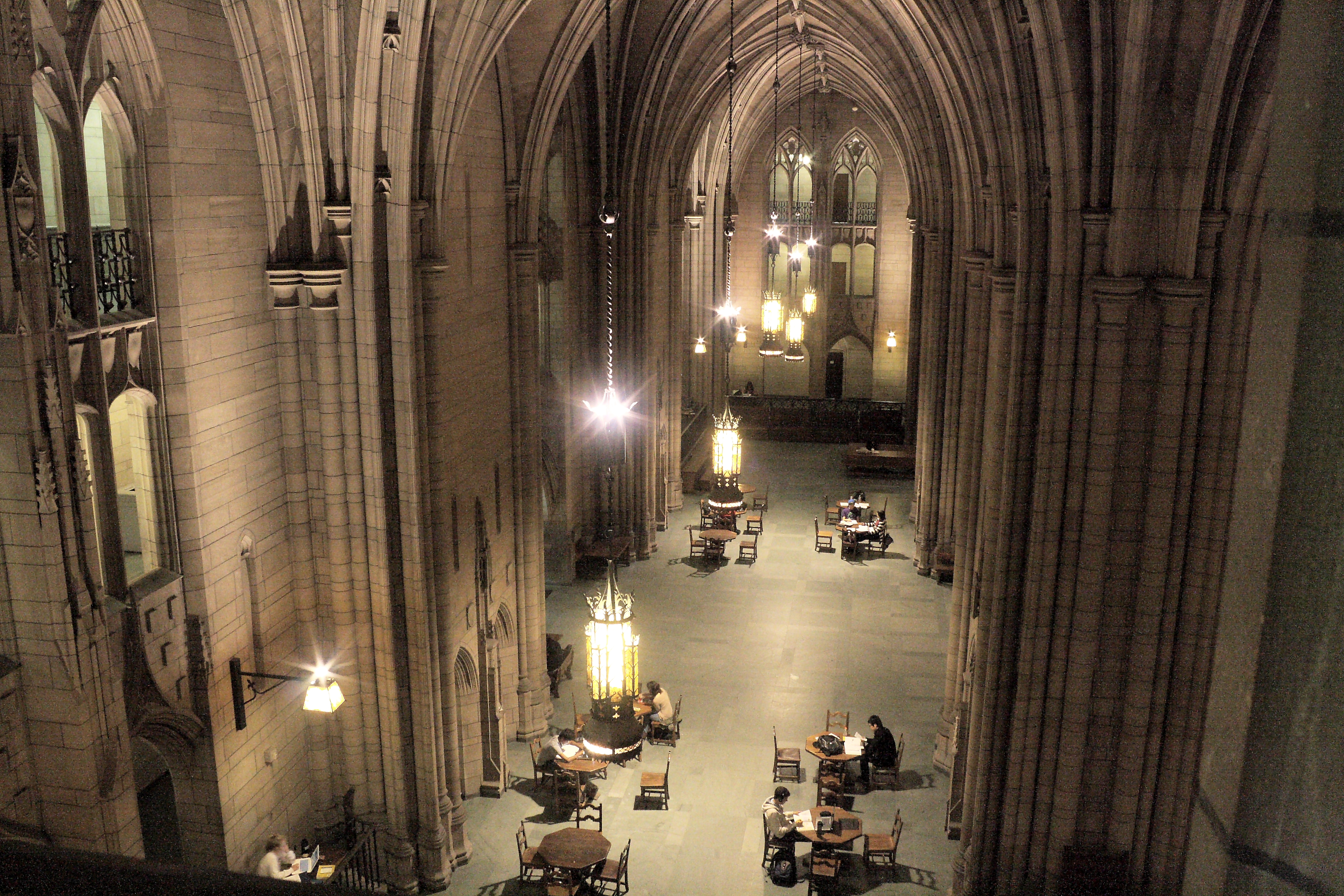
Commons Room

The main part of the cathedral's first floor, the Commons Room, called one of the "great architectural fantasies of the twentieth century", is a fifteenth-century English perpendicular Gothic-style hall that covers half an acre (2,000 m^{2}) and extends upward four stories, reaching 52 feet (16 m) tall. The room was a gift of Andrew Mellon. It is a piece of true Gothic architecture; no steel supports were used in the construction of its arches. Each arch is a true arch, and they support their own weight. Each base for the arches weighs five tons, and it is said that they are so firmly placed that each could hold a large truck. The large central piers act only as screens for the structural steel that holds up the upper floors of the building.

Despite its heavy use, the Commons Room is kept quiet by the use of Guastavino acoustical tiles as the stones between the ribs of vaulting. This feature was insisted upon by Chancellor Bowman. The architect, Klauder, objected due to the increased costs of this construction method. Bowman responded with the comment: "You cannot build a great University with fraud in it."

Klauder considered the Commons Room to be his greatest achievement.

Joseph Gattoni designed the stonework, much of which depicts western Pennsylvanian plant life. The walls are made of Indiana limestone and the floor is green Vermont slate.

The wrought iron in the room, including the large gates leading to the elevators, was a gift from George Hubbard Clapp and was designed by the ironworker Samuel Yellin. Over the gates are two lines by Robert Bridges, from an untitled poem:

Here is eternal spring; for you the very stars of heaven are new.

Also located in the corridors surrounding the Commons Room are plaques featuring calligraphy designed and hand-cut in slate by Edward Catich, including one featuring a poem by Lawrence Lee titled "The Cathedral," as well as stained glass windows by Charles Connick.

== Nationality Rooms ==
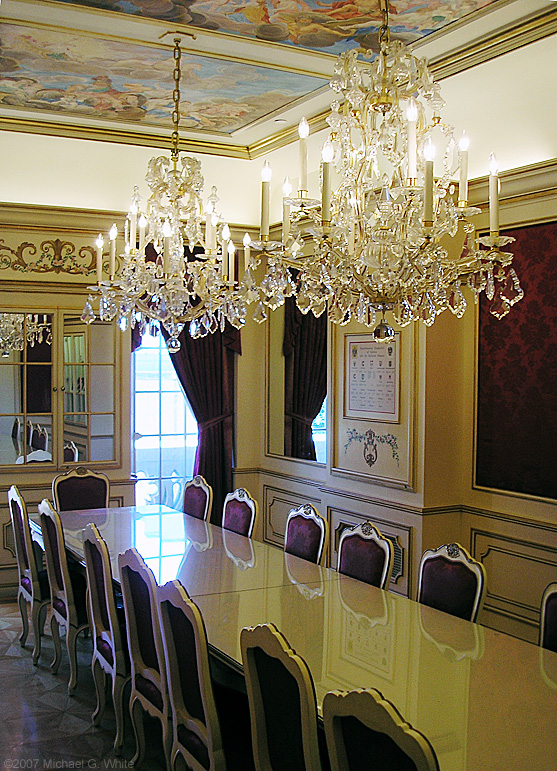
The Austrian Classroom, one of 31 Nationality Rooms in the Cathedral of Learning

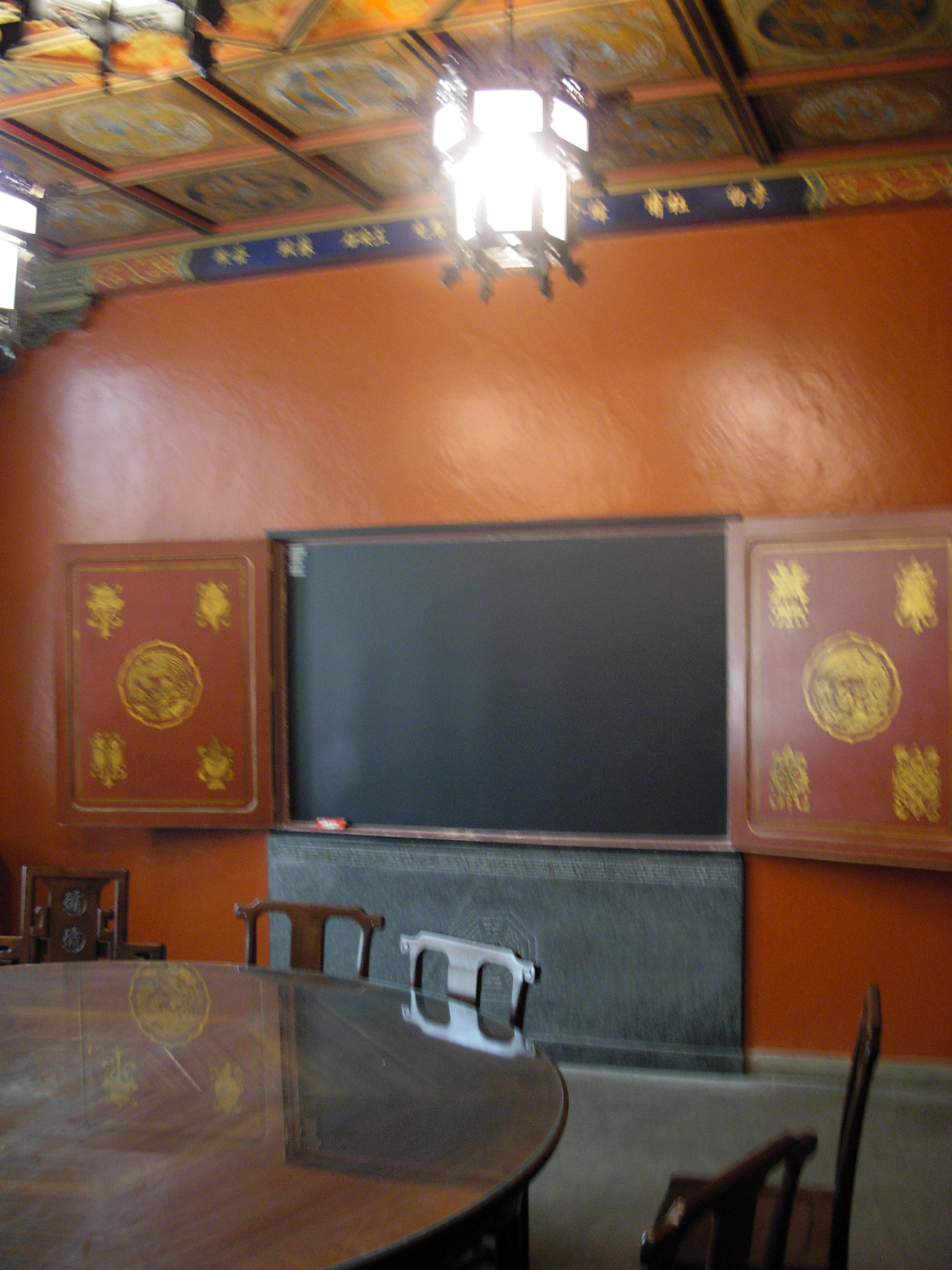
The Chinese Classroom

The cathedral is home to 31 Nationality Rooms located on the first and third floors: 29 working classrooms and two rooms used mostly for display or occasional special events. Each nationality room is designed to celebrate a different culture that had an influence on Pittsburgh's growth, depicting an era prior to (or in the singular case of the French Classroom, just after) 1787, the year of the university's founding and of the signing of the U.S. Constitution.

The Nationality Room programs began in 1926 when Bowman decided that he wanted to involve the community as much as he could in constructing the cathedral, so he proposed that each nationality that had a significant number of people in Pittsburgh would be allowed to design their nationality's room for the cathedral. Each group had to form a Room Committee responsible for all fundraising, designing, and acquisition. The university provided only the room and, upon completion, upkeep for perpetuity. All other materials, labor, and design were provided by the individual committees. These were sometimes aided by foreign governments and the rooms contain multiple authentic artifacts and materials from the country represented. A typical room on the 1st floor (those built between 1938 and 1957) took between three and ten years to complete and cost the equivalent of US$300,000 in 2006 dollars. More recent rooms have cost in the range of $750,000 and up.

=== Classrooms ===
- African Heritage
- Armenian
- Austrian
- Chinese
- Czechoslovak
- Early American (Display)
- English

- French
- German
- Greek
- Hungarian
- Indian
- Irish
- Israel Heritage

- Italian
- Japanese
- Lithuanian
- Korean
- Norwegian
- Philippine
- Polish

- Romanian
- Russian
- Scottish
- Swedish
- Swiss
- Syrian-Lebanon (Display)
- Turkish

- Ukrainian
- Welsh
- Yugoslav

=== Proposed rooms ===
There are six nationality rooms in various stages of planning to add to the current 31.

- Danish
- Finnish
- Iranian

- Latin American & Caribbean
- Moroccan
- Thai

== Other notable spaces ==
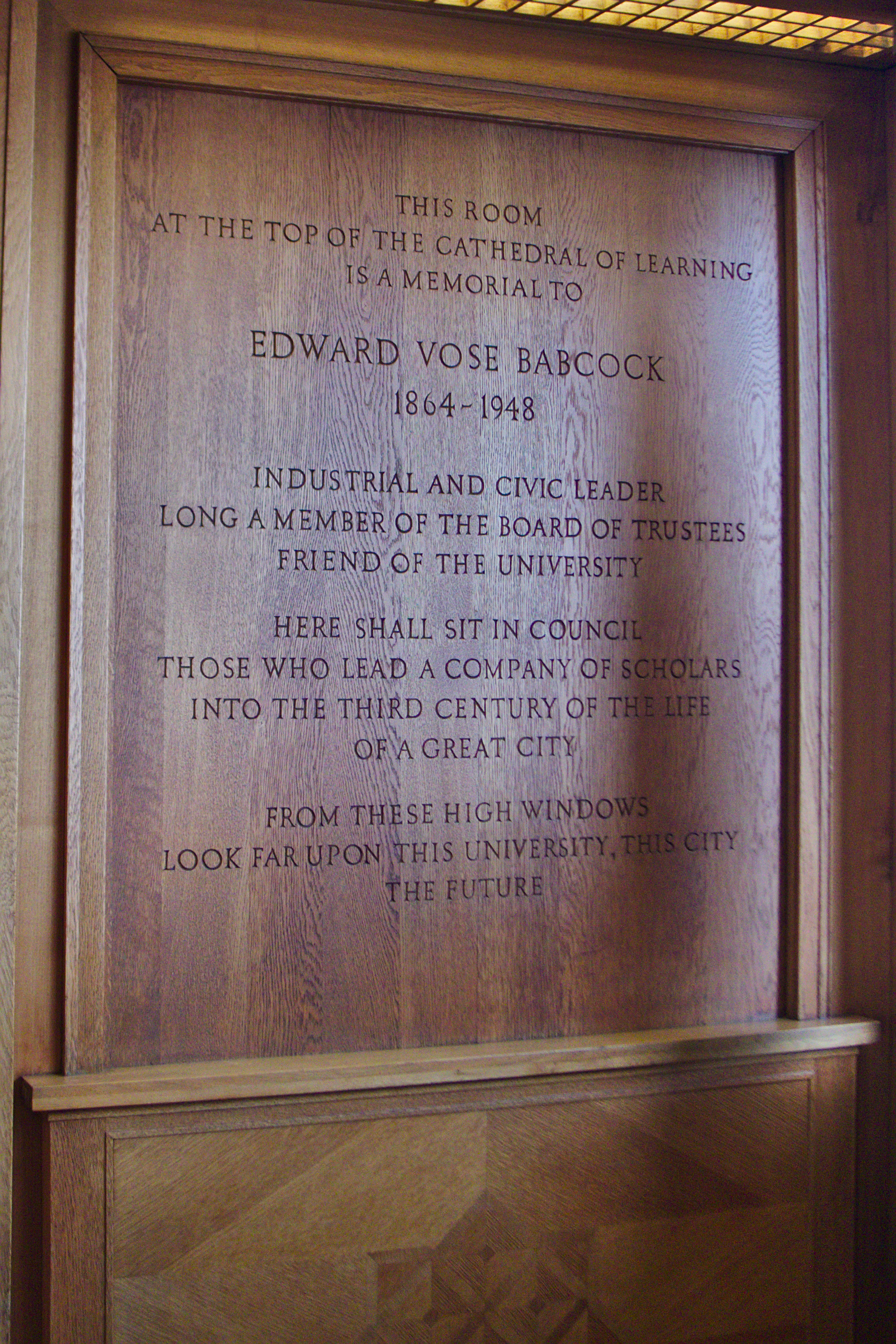
Dedication panel of the Babcock Memorial Room

There are several other notable facilities and rooms within the Cathedral of Learning. In addition, these spaces do not fall under the auspices of the Nationality Rooms program.

=== Babcock Room ===
The Edward V. Babcock Memorial Room is a plush, carpeted, wood-paneled conference room constructed on the 40th floor for use as the university trustees' boardroom. Funded by a Babcock family grant of $327,000 ($3.65 million in 2025 dollars) and dedicated in November 1958, all of the room's features are original, except for the lighting, furniture and carpeting. The room's square shape is modified by four alcoves, in one of which is a portrait of Babcock by Malcolm Stevens Parcell. The walls, featuring intricate geometric patterns, are paneled in Appalachian white oak with burled walnut inlays and touches of rosewood. The windows, adorned by leaf-patterned curtains, boast a spectacular panoramic view of the surrounding area. The room is also adjoined by a kitchen. Access to the room is limited to a spiral staircase and an elevator, both requiring a key, that originate on the 36th floor. During the early 1970s at the height of student activism, a group of protesting students attempted to barricade the room during a trustees meeting. Today, the trustees have outgrown the room and generally meet in the Assembly Room of the William Pitt Union. The Babcock room now serves as a seminar and meeting room and is also used for special events. A pair of peregrine falcons nests on the balcony outside the room.

=== Braun Room ===
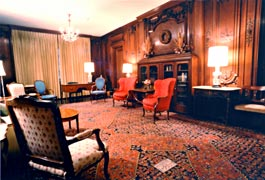
The Braun Room in the Cathedral of Learning

Following the opening of the Cathedral of Learning, the offices of the Dean of Women moved to the 12th floor of the Cathedral in 1938. The interior was unfinished but Dean Thyrsa Amos envisioned it being used as a space for women to meet.

When Dean Amos died in 1941, the new quarters were still unfinished. The Alumnae Association created the Thyrsa W. Amos Fund to plaster the walls and to furnish Room 1217 in her name. Room 1217 was never finished, but after World War II the other rooms on the twelfth floor were completed including room 1201, now known as the Braun Room. Mrs. A. E. Braun donated the furnishings and floral carved mahogany wood paneling which she had purchased in 1941 from the library of the home of Grant McCargo in the East End of Pittsburgh. The Braun Room was dedicated in 1946 and serves, along with its furniture, as an example of a modern reproduction of Louis XV design. Original blue carpeting was replaced in 1955 with a Persian rug, named "The Iron Rug of Persia", that was donated by the daughter and son-in-law of A. E. Braun. Restored in 2015, the rug was made for a regional Khan in the northern part of Iran around 1810. Other features of the room include a low bookcase, bordered and topped with classic carving, that was crafted by university carpenters to replace the original fireplace whose inclusion was impractical on the 12th floor, along with two crystal drop chandeliers.

Dean Helen Pool Rush and her successor, Dean Savina Skewis, carried on the traditions of Dean Amos until the Dean of Women's Office was closed in 1969, and its functions and quarters were assumed by other departments. The Braun Room is used for meetings and study abroad scholarship selection panels.

=== Croghan-Schenley Ballroom ===
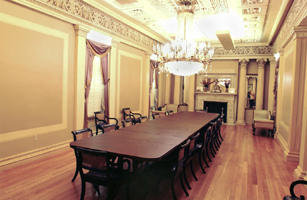
Croghan-Schenley Ballroom in the Cathedral of Learning

The Croghan-Schenley room, situated on the first floor of the Cathedral in room 156, is actually two adjoining Greek Revival rooms, the Ballroom and the Oval Room, connected by a hidden passageway in the Ballroom's fireplace. The rooms were originally part of William Croghan Jr.'s mansion, known as the Picnic House, built in 1830 in the Stanton Heights area of Pittsburgh. The rooms themselves were created in 1835 by the Philadelphia carver Mordecai Van Horn, and they have been regarded as being among the most lavish examples of Greek Revival designs in America.

His daughter, Mary Elizabeth, went to boarding school in New York, but in 1842 at the age of fifteen she eloped with 43-year-old Edward Wyndham Harrington Schenley, a captain in the British military. The elopement caused a family schism. Mary would not visit often, and in an effort to convince her to move back to Pittsburgh, the new rooms were commissioned. Following the death of William Croghan in 1850, the mansion was run by caretakers with no permanent residents for some 60 years. William S. Miller, then president of Steelwood Corp., purchased the Croghan mansion following World War II and it was soon leveled for a new housing development, but the Croghan-Schenley rooms were spared.

In 1955, the rooms, donated by Miller, were dismantled and rebuilt in the cathedral, except that the original ceilings had to be lowered about 8 inches to accommodate the available space.

In 1982, the rooms were refurbished to their 19th century glory. Highlighting the ballroom are the hand-cut glass chandelier and four wooden, hand-carved Greek columns, surviving examples of western Pennsylvania's Greek classical revival period popular with those of means in the 1830s.

The Croghan-Schenley rooms are the last extant vestiges of the estate of Mary Schenley, who before she died gave much of her holdings and property to the city of Pittsburgh—including Schenley farms, where the Cathedral sits, and Schenley Park.

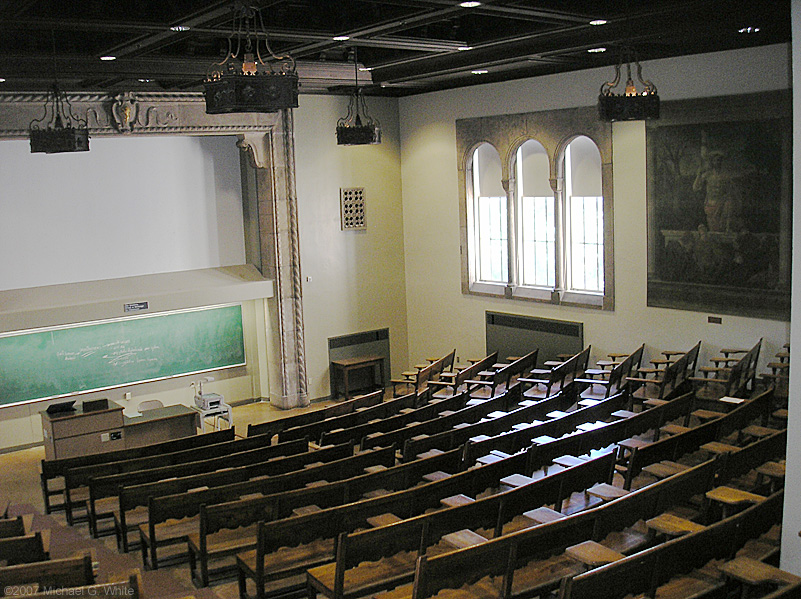
The Frick Auditorium

Stories tell of a ghost, speculated to be that of Mary Schenley, that is said to roam the Ballroom and Nationality Rooms. The doors to the rooms are locked every night, but furniture is sometimes said to be found rearranged by daylight staff. The swinging of the chandelier has been said to indicate her presence.

=== Frick Auditorium ===
The Frick Auditorium is a lecture hall in room 324 of the Cathedral of Learning. Originally conceptualized as the Fine Arts Lecture Room intended to complement the Fine Arts Department then located on the seventh floor, the room was completed in 1939 and features stone mullions, chambranle, and other trim as well as wooden lecture seating and a coffered ceiling. A centerpiece element in the room is a Nicholas Lochoff reproduction of The Resurrection by Piero della Francesca that was purchased for the lecture hall by Helen Clay Frick. Frick would later donate a large collection of Lochoff reproductions to the university which are on display in the Nicholas Lochoff Cloister in the university's Frick Fine Arts Building.

=== Humanities Center ===
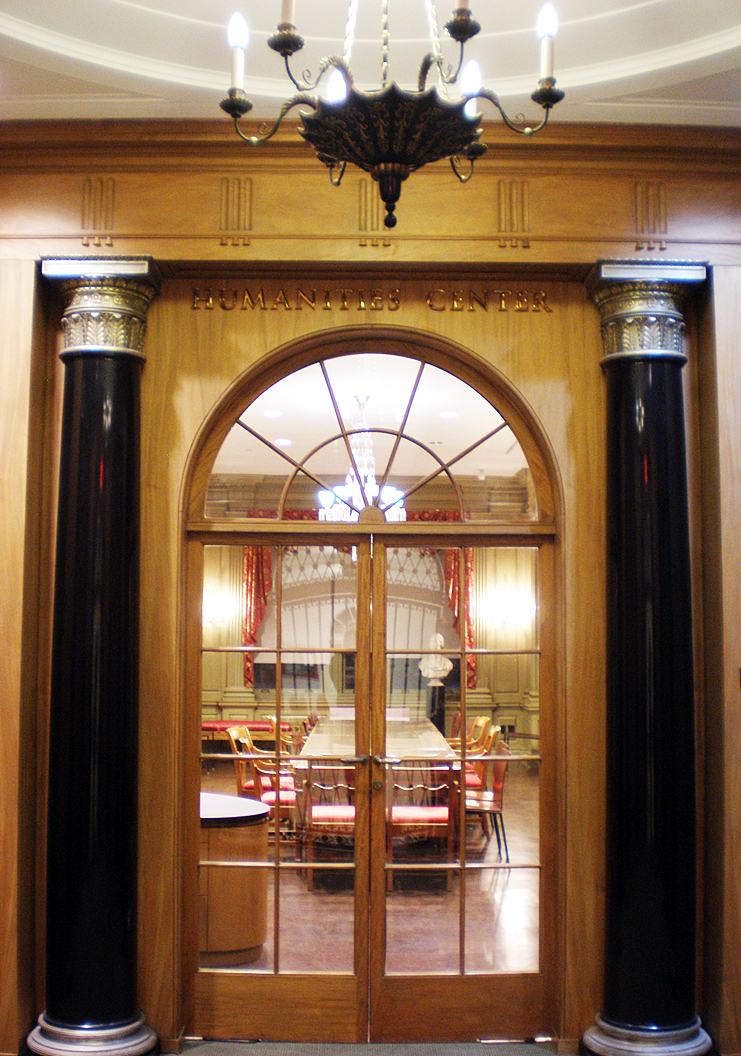
Entrance to the Humanities Center

The University of Pittsburgh's Humanities Center, part of School of Arts and Sciences, is housed in the Cathedral of Learning's room 602, which was a sixth-floor space once occupied by the Darlington Memorial Library. Following digitization and protective storage of the library's materials, its space was renovated in 2009 by architect Rob Pfaffmann to house the center, which now includes office space for staff and visiting fellows. The Humanities Center space retains much of the original character and a number of the antique furnishings originally bequeathed to the university by the Darlington family, and features moldings and green walls that are duplicated from the 18th mansion Graeme Park, a Pennsylvania colonial-era governor's residence. The Center for Humanities was finished in time for an open house that was part a conference hosted by the center on November 14–15, 2009.

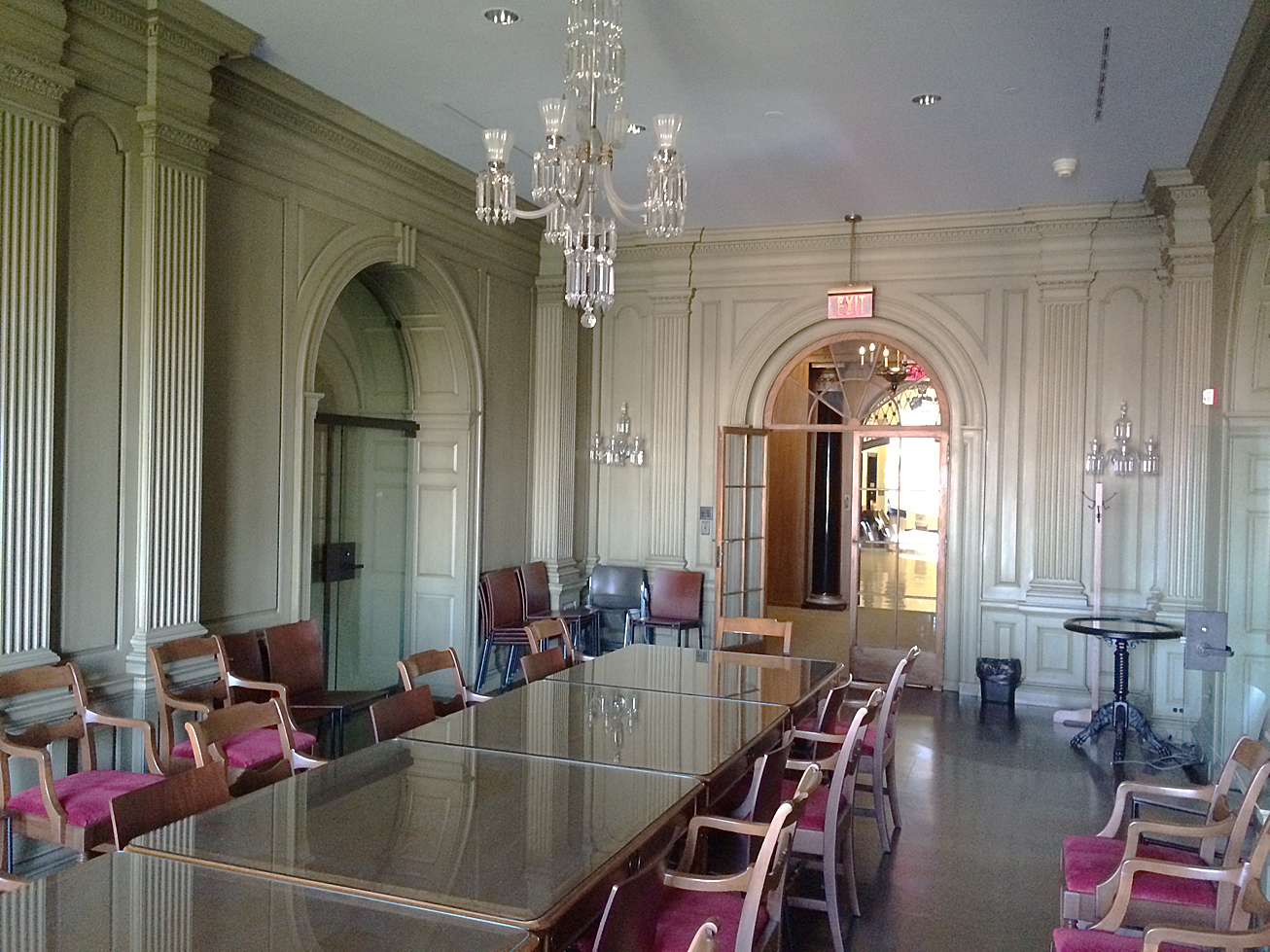
Humanities Center

The space served as the home of The Darlington Memorial Library from 1936 until its recent conversion to the Humanities Center. The library was entered through a memorial vestibule and consisted of a central room with eight alcoves. Among other notable furnishings, it contained a wrought iron entrance gate by Samuel Yellin. The library was given to the University of Pittsburgh by the daughters of William McCullough Darlington and Mary Carson Darlington. The initial gift of eleven thousand volumes was made in 1918 by Mary O'Hara Darlington and Edith Darlington Ammon. This was followed by Mary O'Hara Darlington's bequest in 1925 of the remainder of the family's library and much of the family estate. The Darlington family's tremendous interest in historical research was the force behind creating what was said to be the largest private library west of the Alleghenies. The library collection is particularly rich in material about the French and Indian War and the history of Western Pennsylvania and the Ohio Valley, as both William and Mary Darlington researched and published in these areas. While the collection's main focus is on American history and literature, other collection highlights include rare maps and atlases, works on ornithology and natural history, and early travel narratives. The Darlington's son, O'Hara Darlington, also amassed collections of Victorian literature sporting books and works of illustrators and caricaturists. The collection also has been enriched over the years by donations from other individuals and organizations, which especially have enhanced its content about the history of the Western Pennsylvania region.

Before renovation of the original library space, its materials were digitized and placed online at The Darlington Digital Library. The original, sometimes fragile, materials of the library were placed in storage for availability to researchers upon request. A virtual tour of the Darlington Memorial Library as it previously existed in the Cathedral of Learning is available at the main entrance and the main room.

=== Cultural Studies, Film Studies, and GSWS program space ===
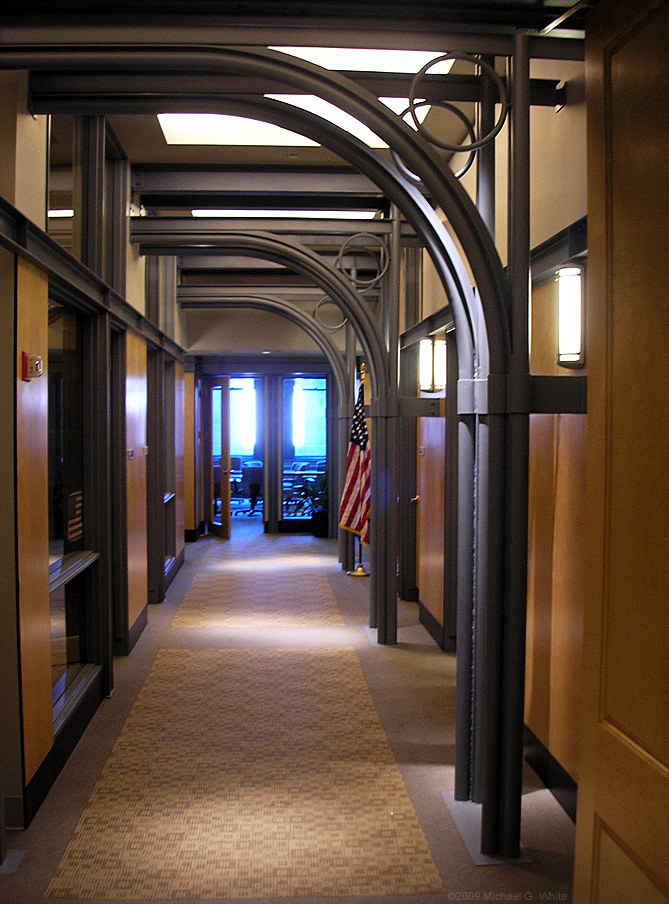
Former McCarl Center

Located on the fourth floor of the Cathedral of Learning, the current home of both the Cultural Studies, Film Studies, and Gender, Sexuality, & Women's Studies (GSWS) programs, was the prior home of the McCarl Center for Nontraditional Student Success until it moved to Wesley W. Posvar Hall in 2014. The space occupies what once housed two levels of the main stacks of the university's library. The 2,500-square-foot (230 m^{2}) space was previously opened as the $537,000 McCarl Center in 2002. Made possible by a gift from F. James and Foster J.J. McCarl, it was designed by Alan J. Cuteri and his architectural firm Strada, LLC, and includes wood finishes, double-height spaces with high ceilings and windows, a main corridor conceived as an interior street, and multiple elements that refer to the Cathedral of Learning's Gothic architecture including decorative painted metal columns with contemporary buttress-style arches. Today the space includes a resource library, offices, and seminar room, and class room that are used by the Cultural Studies and GSWS programs. Students in gender studies classes have access to the gender studies library, which houses classic and recent books on gender/sexuality, and to two gender studies classrooms. The GSWS faculty offices are also nearby. Also hanging in a hallway on the fourth floor outside the space, three unsigned and undated 7-by-3-foot (2.1 by 0.9 m) glass-encased murals that depict Renaissance painting styles and which have long belonged to the university but are of unknown origin.

=== Mulert Memorial Room ===
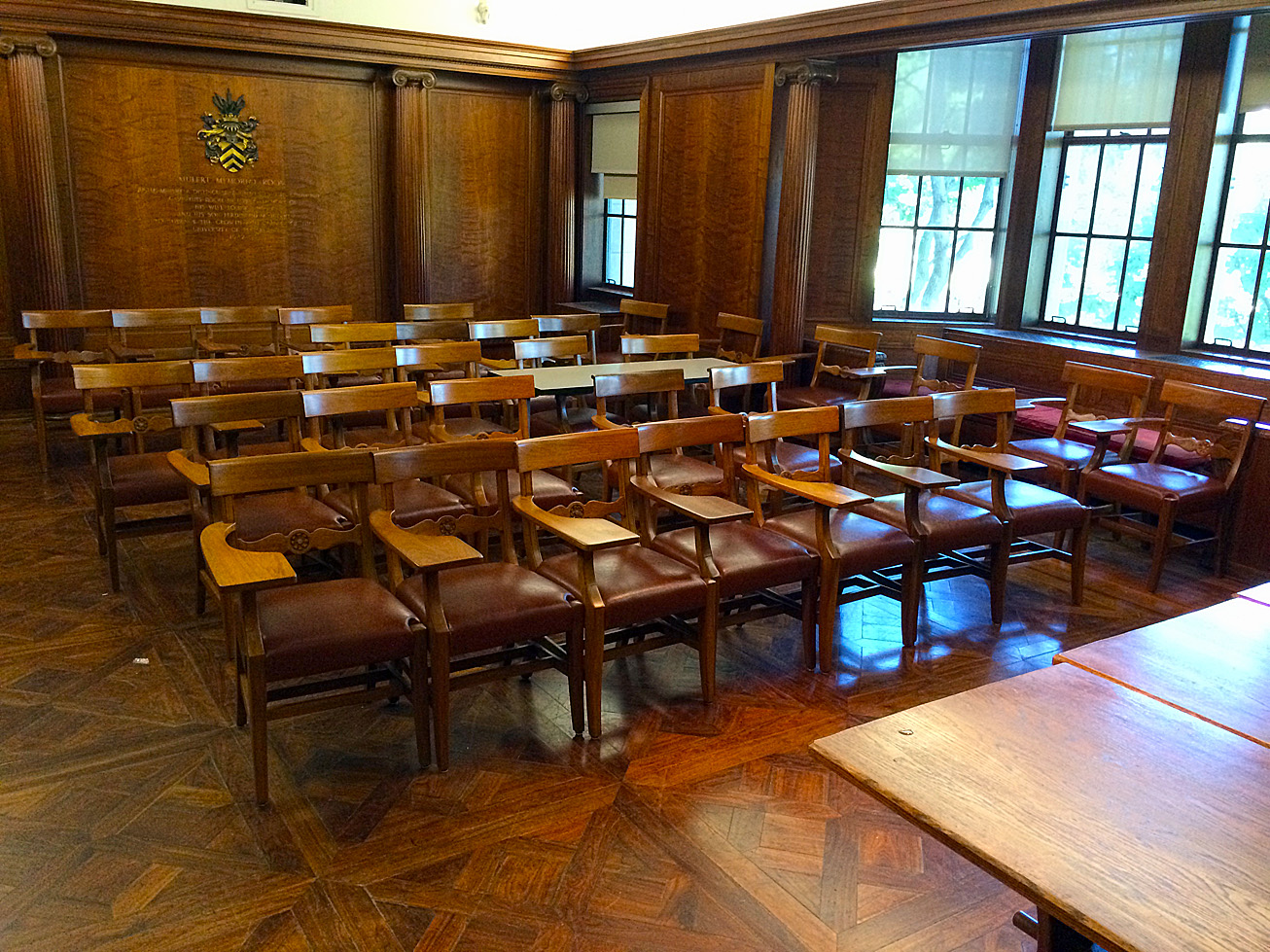
Mulert Memorial Room

Located in room 204, the walnut-paneled Mulert Memorial classroom was designed by Philadelphia architect Gustav Ketterer and university architect Albert Klimcheck. The room features wood floors, fluted ionic columns, red velvet draperies, and student chairs with leather seats. The room's doors have fluted jams and panelings of Greek rosettes. A Mulert family coat-of-arms and memorial inscription is located on the rear wall of the room. The room was provided for in the will of the late Mt. Lebanon resident Justus Mulert, the room was dedicated on December 21, 1942, and serves as a memorial to Mulert's wife, Louise and his son Ferdinand Max, who died in 1912 during his senior year at Washington and Jefferson College.

=== Richard E. Rauh Studio Theatre ===
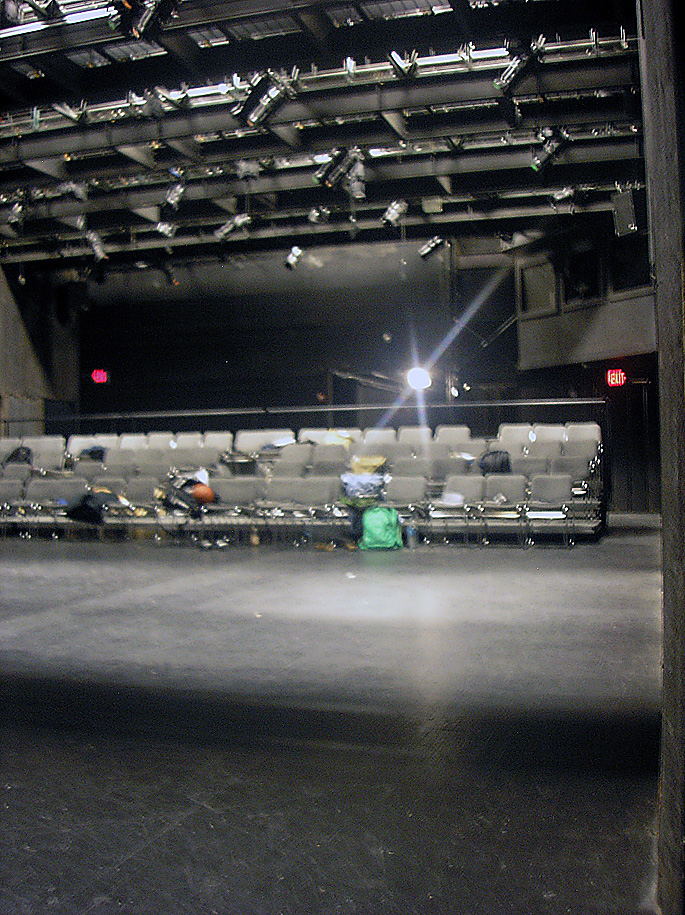
Studio Theatre

The Richard E. Rauh Studio Theatre, a facility utilized by the Department of Theatre Arts, is located in the basement of the cathedral. The Rauh Studio Theatre is a black box space that can be configured for almost any set requirements. It is home to student-directed laboratory productions, play readings, Dark Night Cabaret, and played host to Pittsburgh's longest-running theatre show, Friday Nite Improvs, started in 1989 by graduate theatre students. In 2017 the Studio Theatre was named in honor of Pitt alumnus Richard E. Raugh who donated $1 million to support it and the university's theater productions.

=== Frederick Honors College ===
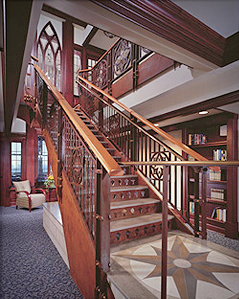
Staircase between the 35th and 36th floors of the Frederick Honors College.

The Frederick Honors College, dedicated in 1986, is housed in a 2002-2003 renovated space on the 35th and 36th floors of the cathedral. The Frederick Honors College provides support and enriched opportunities for scholarship among the university's undergraduates and offers a Bachelor of Philosophy (BPhil) degree.

The 2002-2003 renovation, by Rothschild Doyno Collaborative of Pittsburgh's Strip District, showcased an existing two-story arched window that is visible at night for miles around. The four-leaf medieval quatrefoil medallion at the top of the cathedral is a central motif in the design of the Honors College. Stained glass behind the reception desk at the center of the space was designed by Glenn Greene Glass of Regent Square and centers on a design representing the four seasons, done in polished agate. Wrought ironwork was produced by Vic Reynaud of Technique Manufacturing in the spirit of Samuel Yellin who did the Commons Room ironwork.

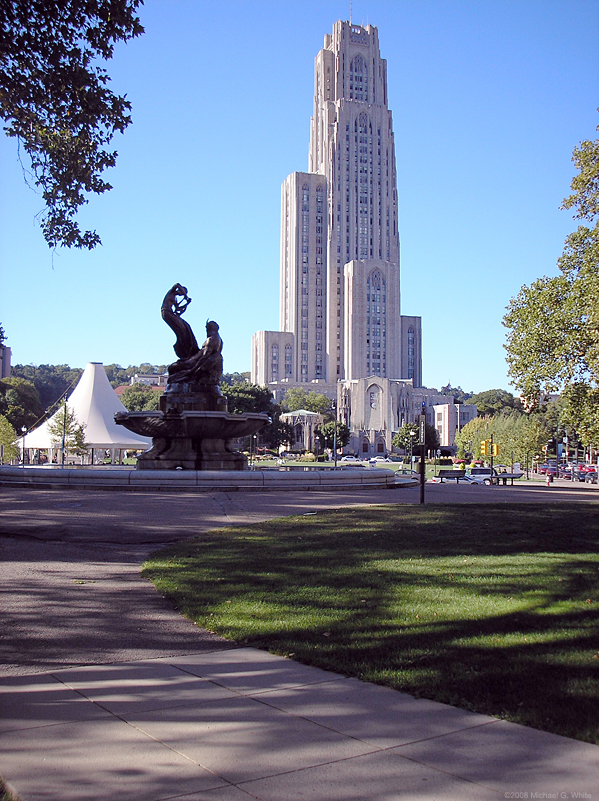
South face of the cathedral from the Frick Fine Arts Building

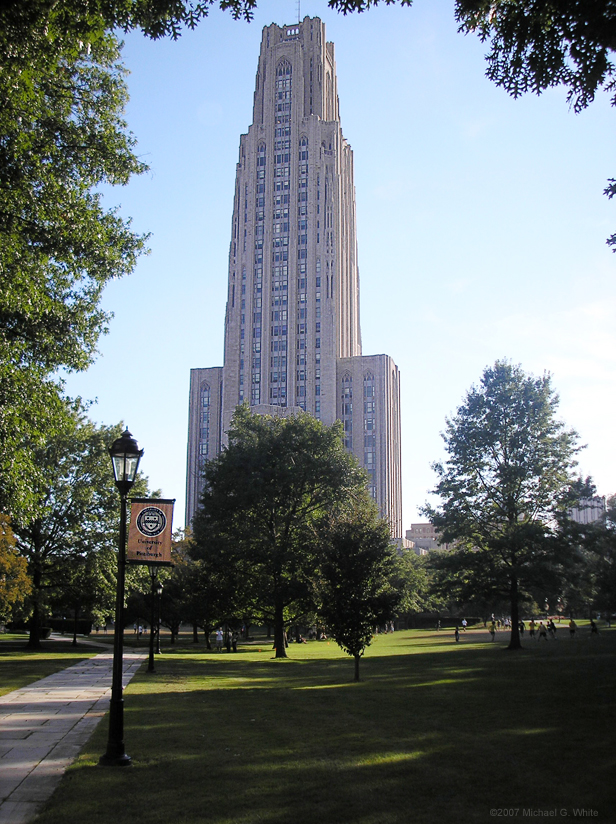
The Cathedral Lawn to the east

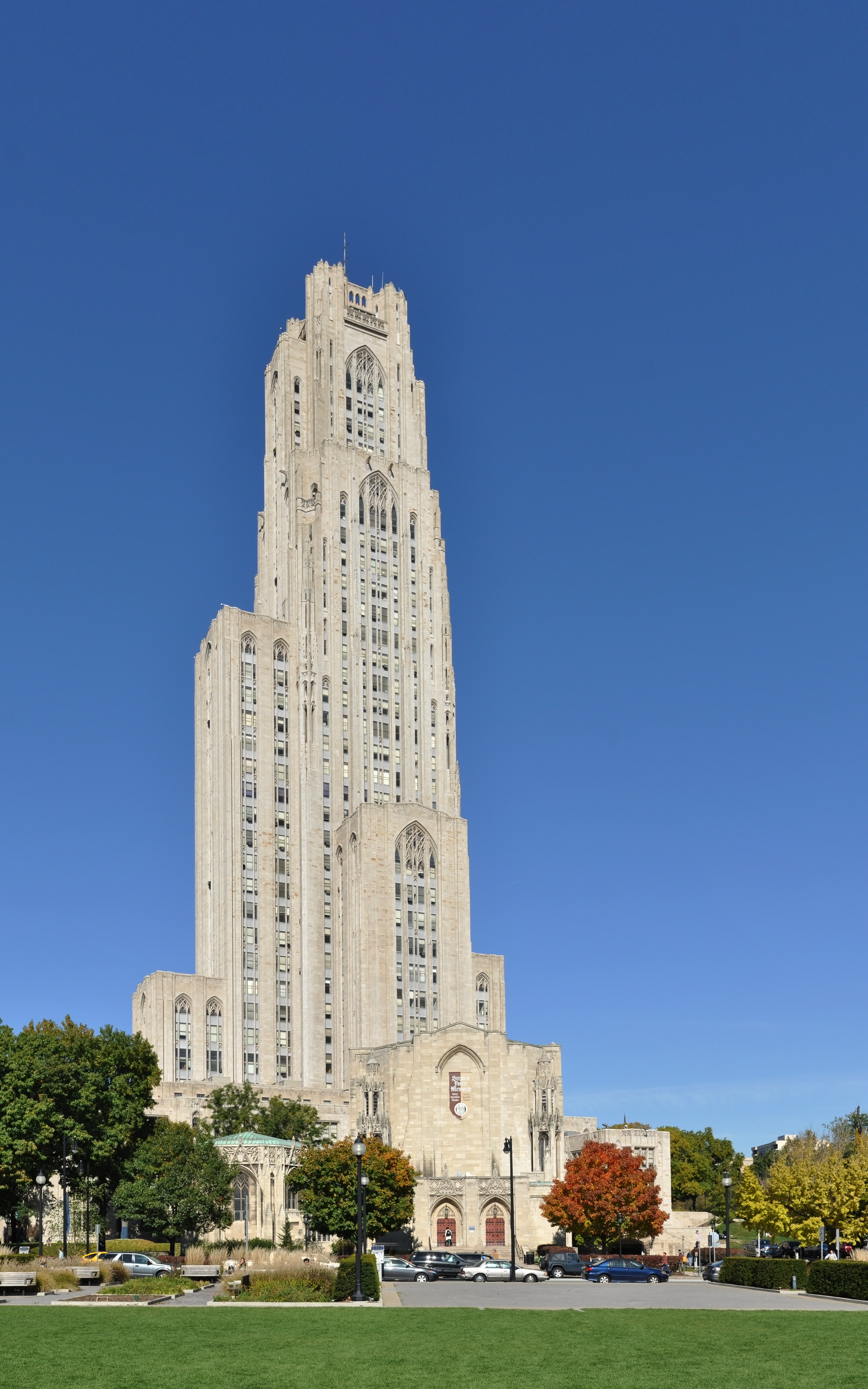
Cathedral and the Stephen Foster Memorial from across Schenley Plaza

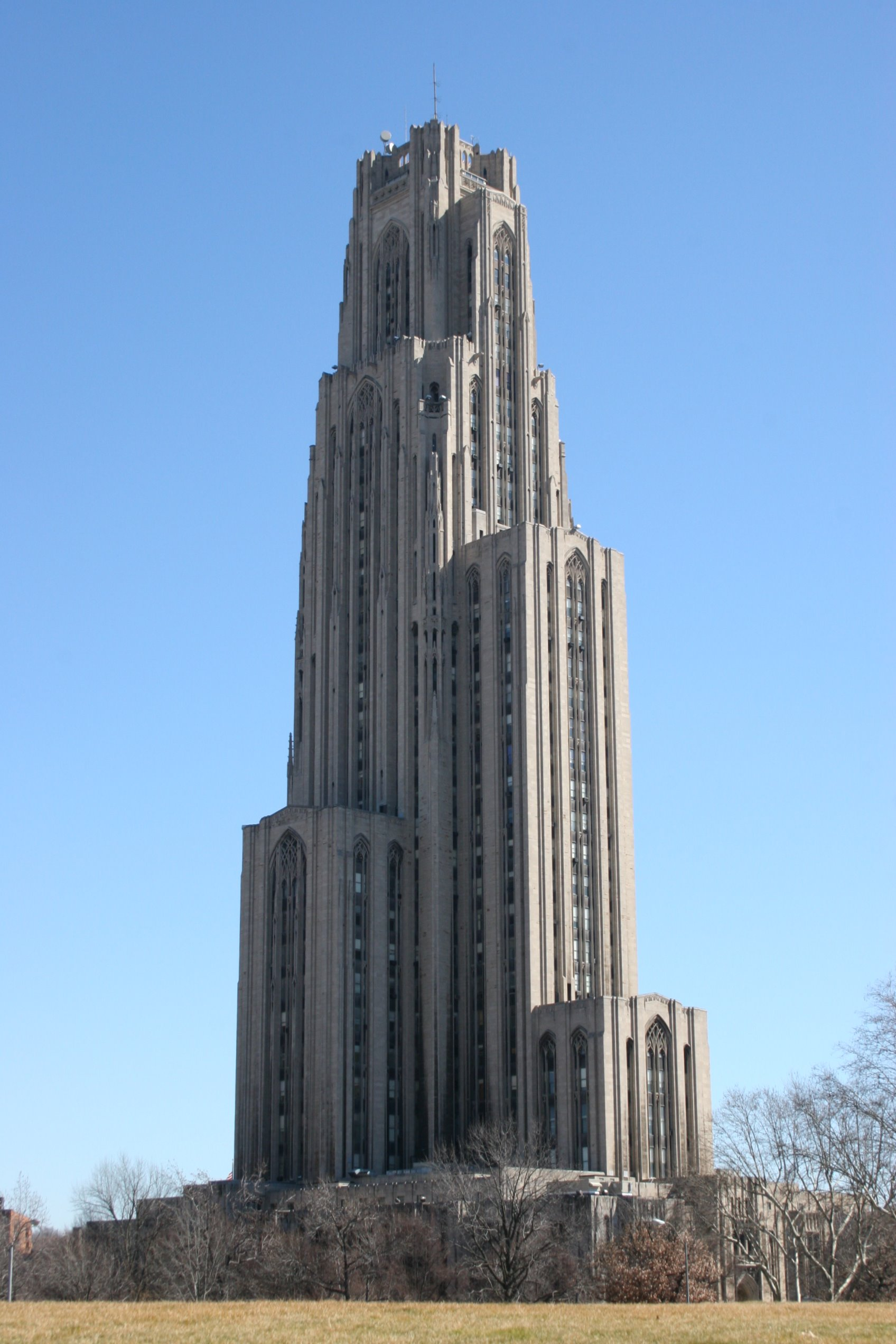
Northwest side of the cathedral from across the lawn of the Sailors and Soldiers Memorial

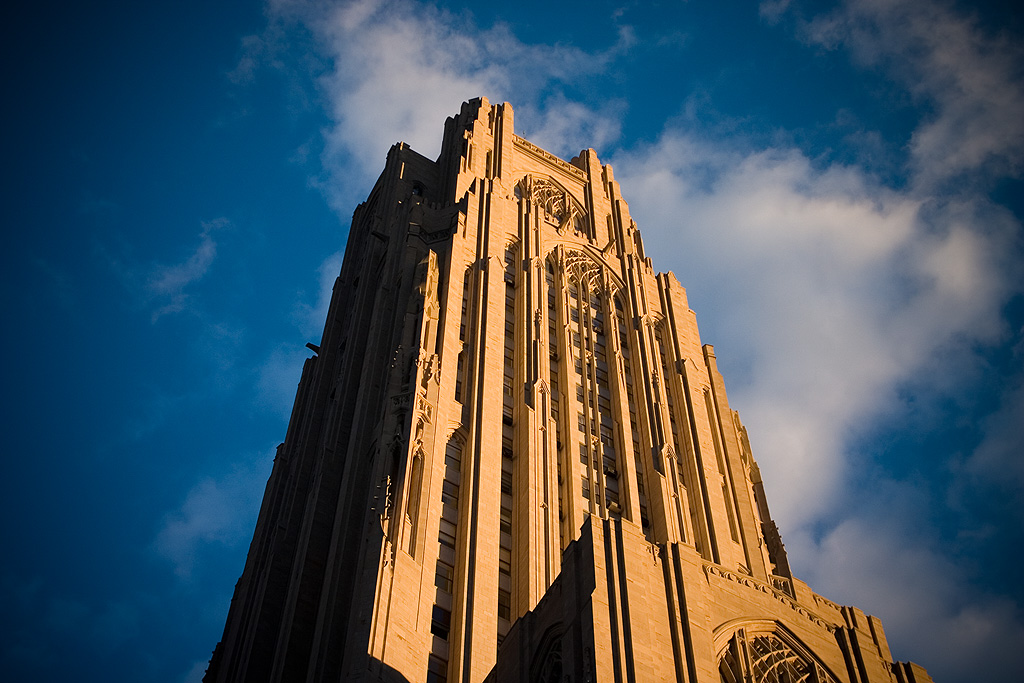
Detail of top floors on the western face

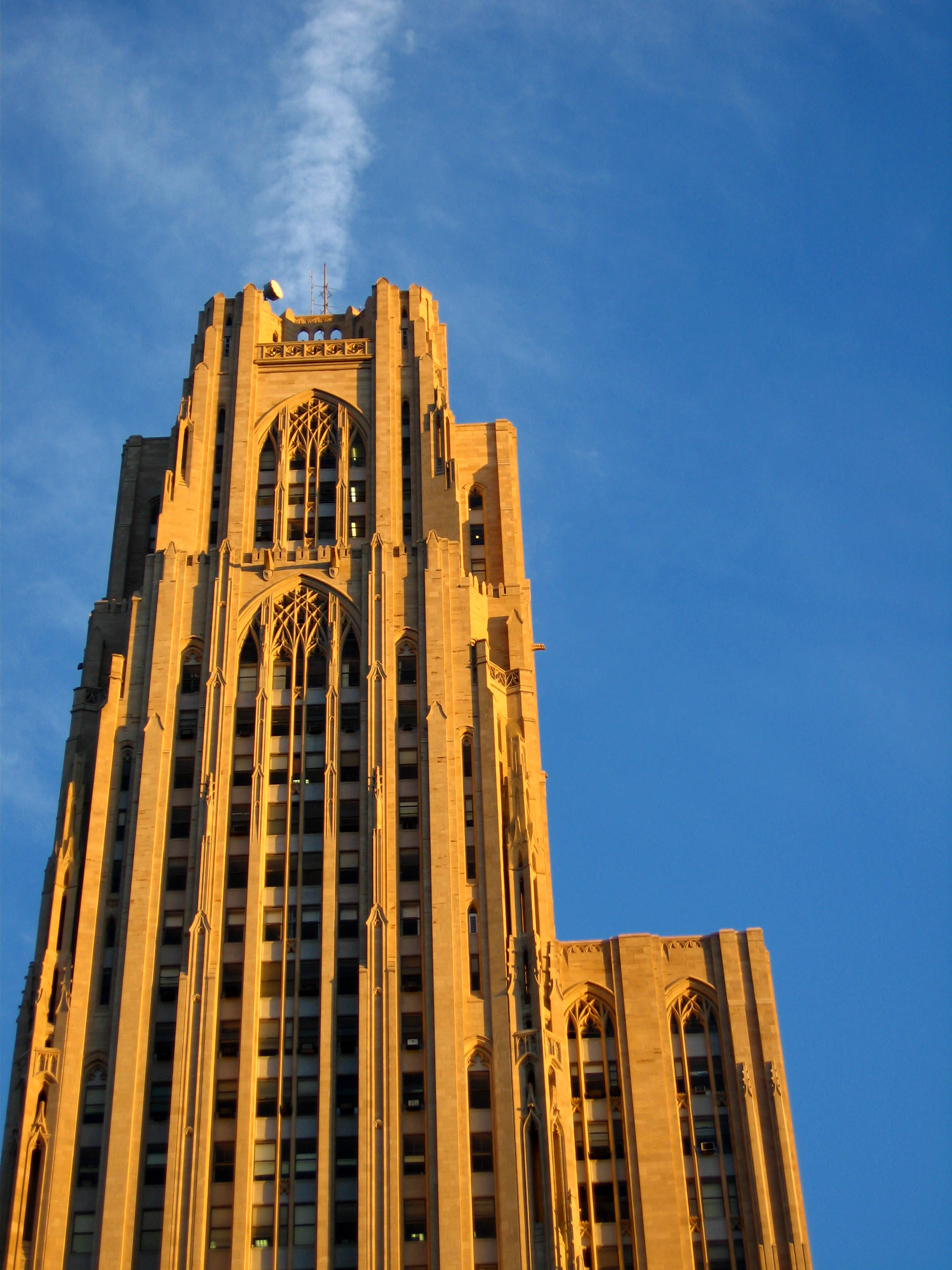
North face top floors

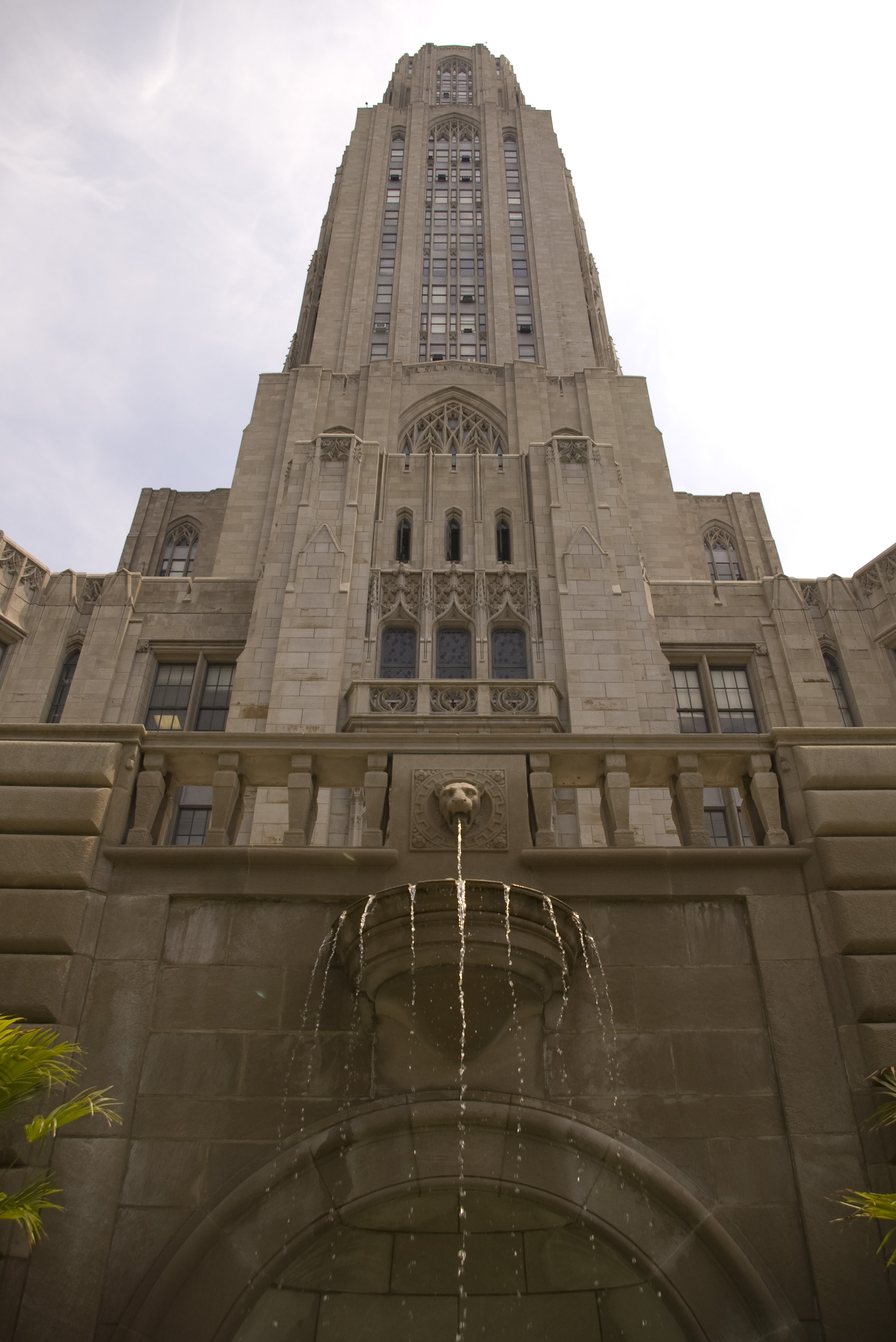
Panther fountain on the west entrance

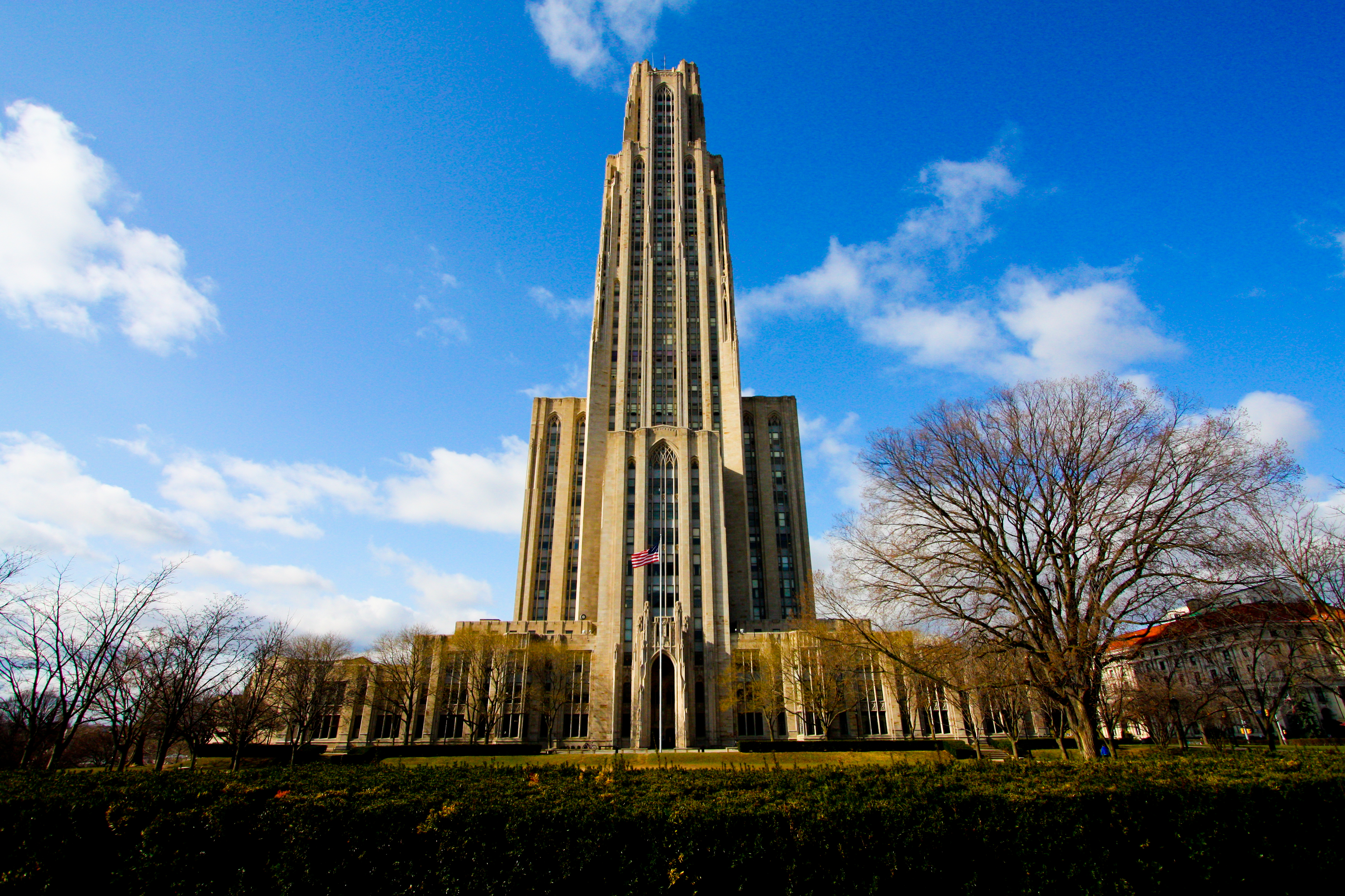
East side

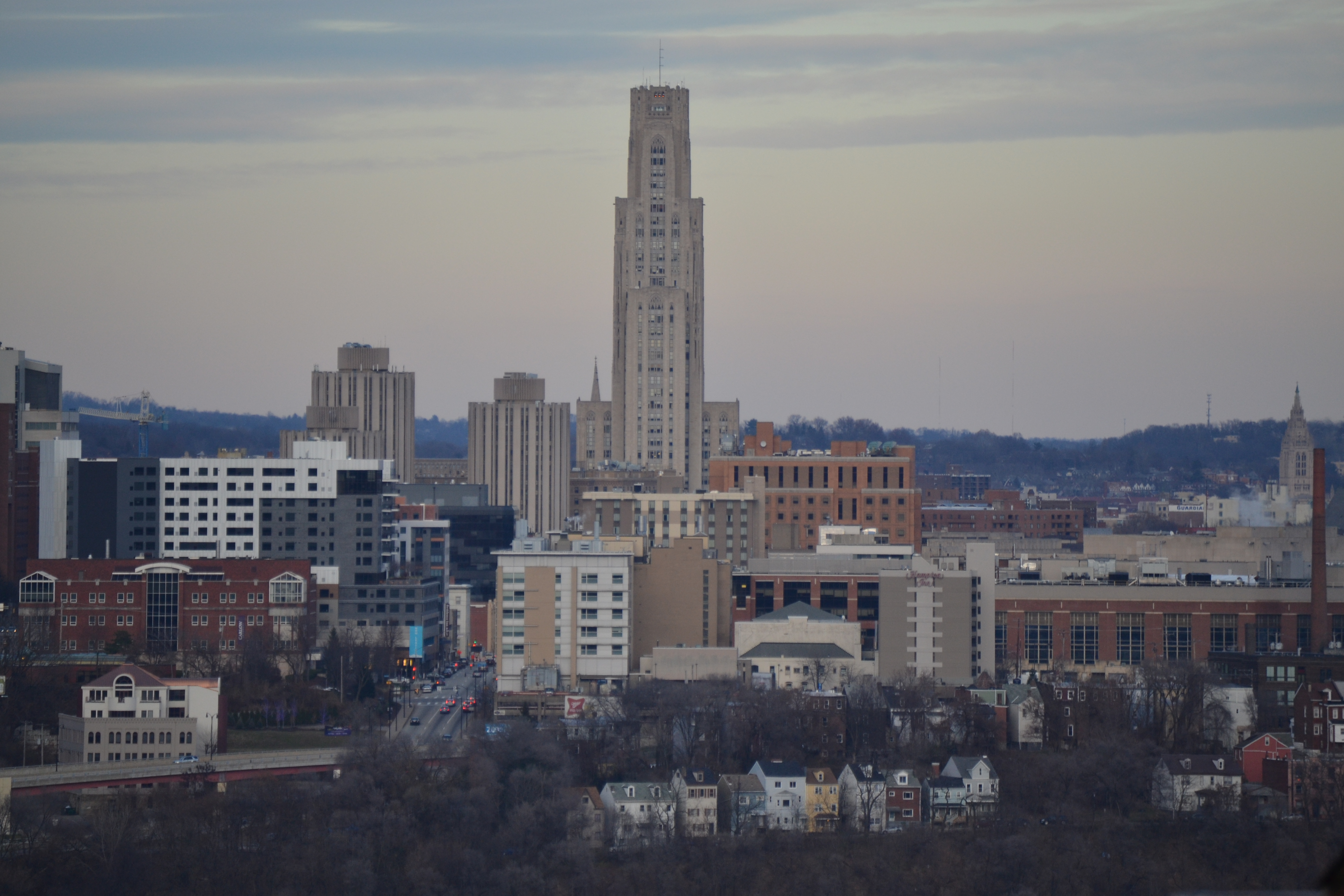
View from the South Side Slopes

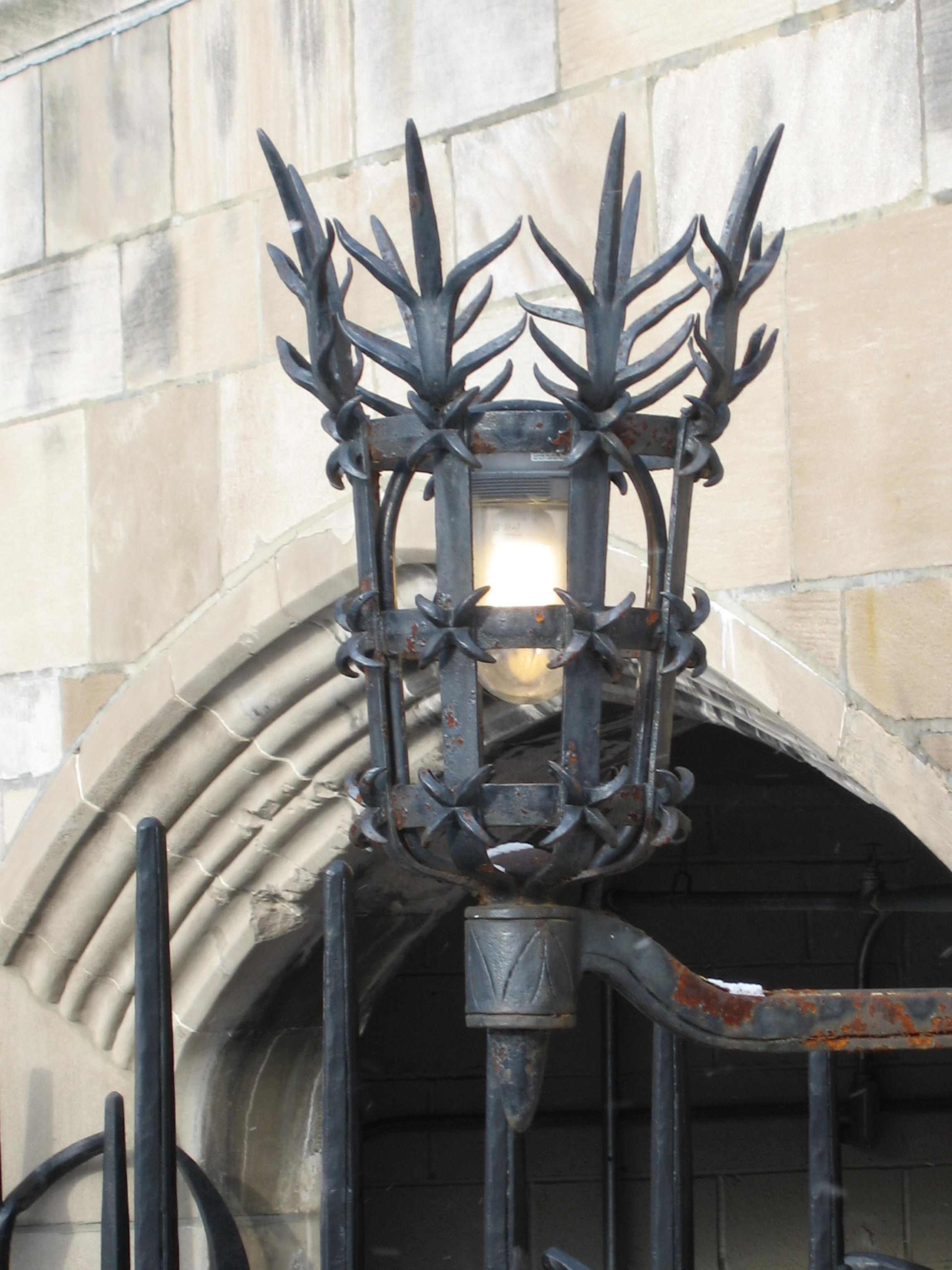
Samuel Yellin ironwork lamp

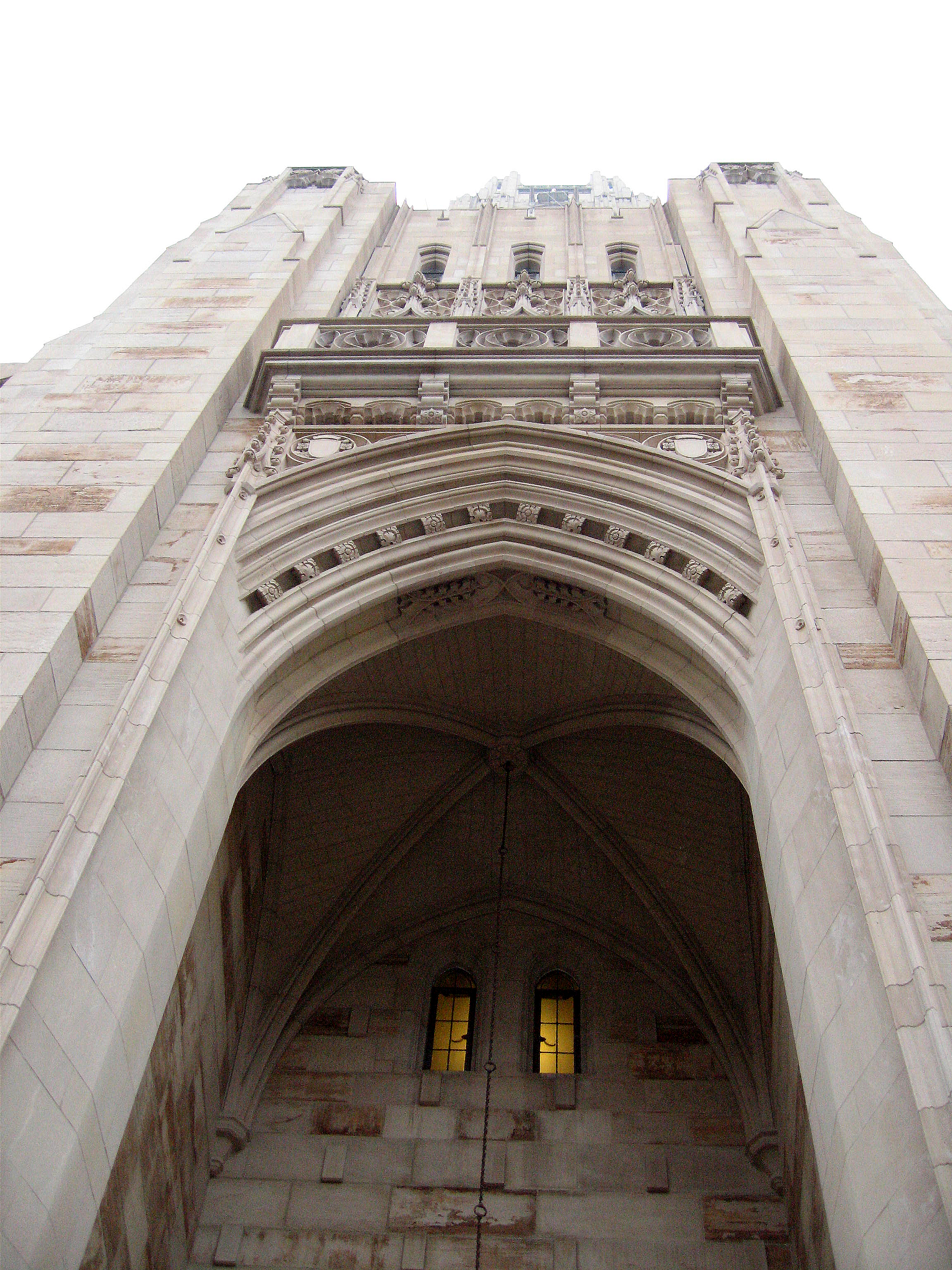
South entrance detail

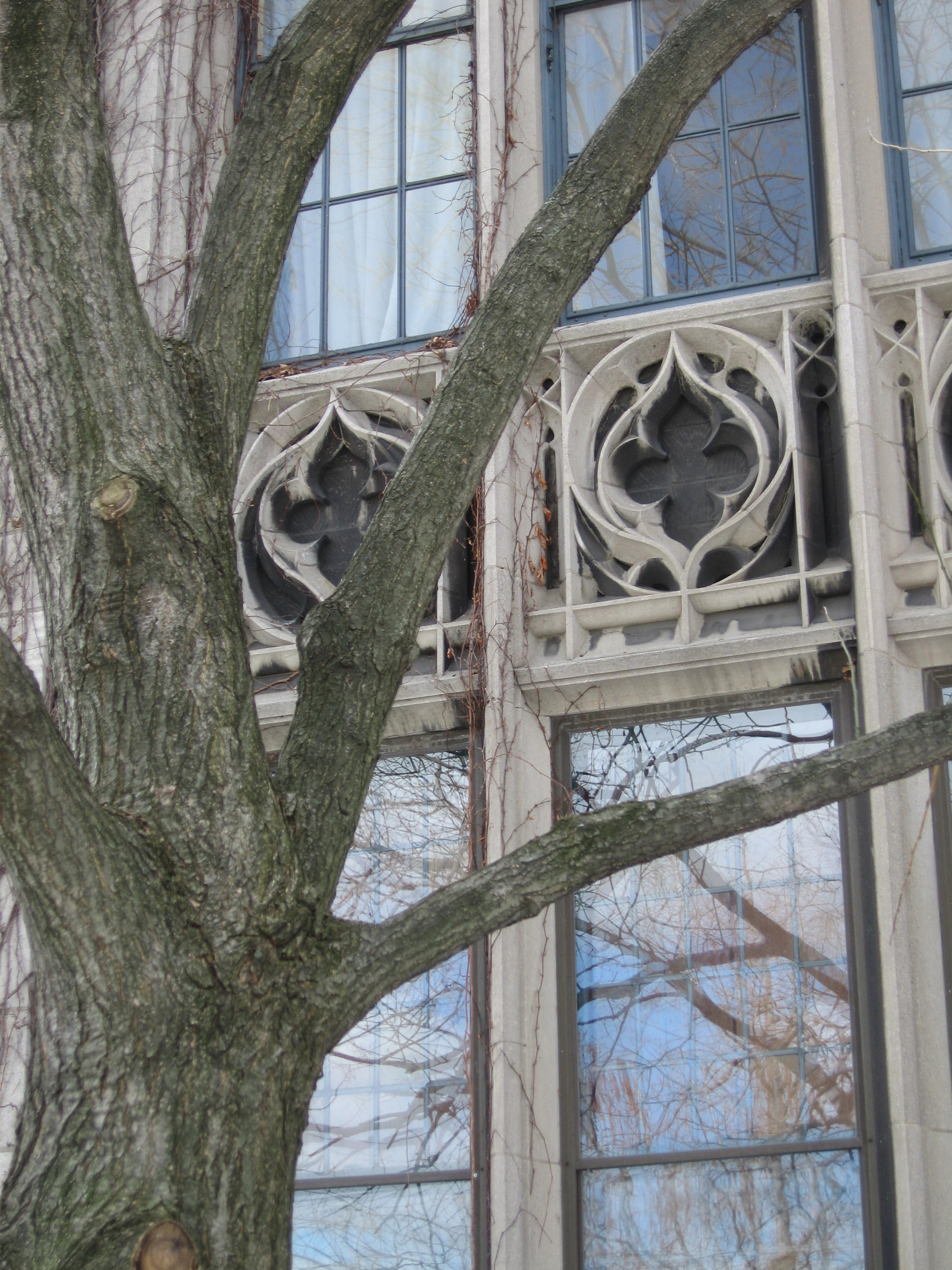
Exterior quatrefoil stonework detail prior to 2007 cleaning

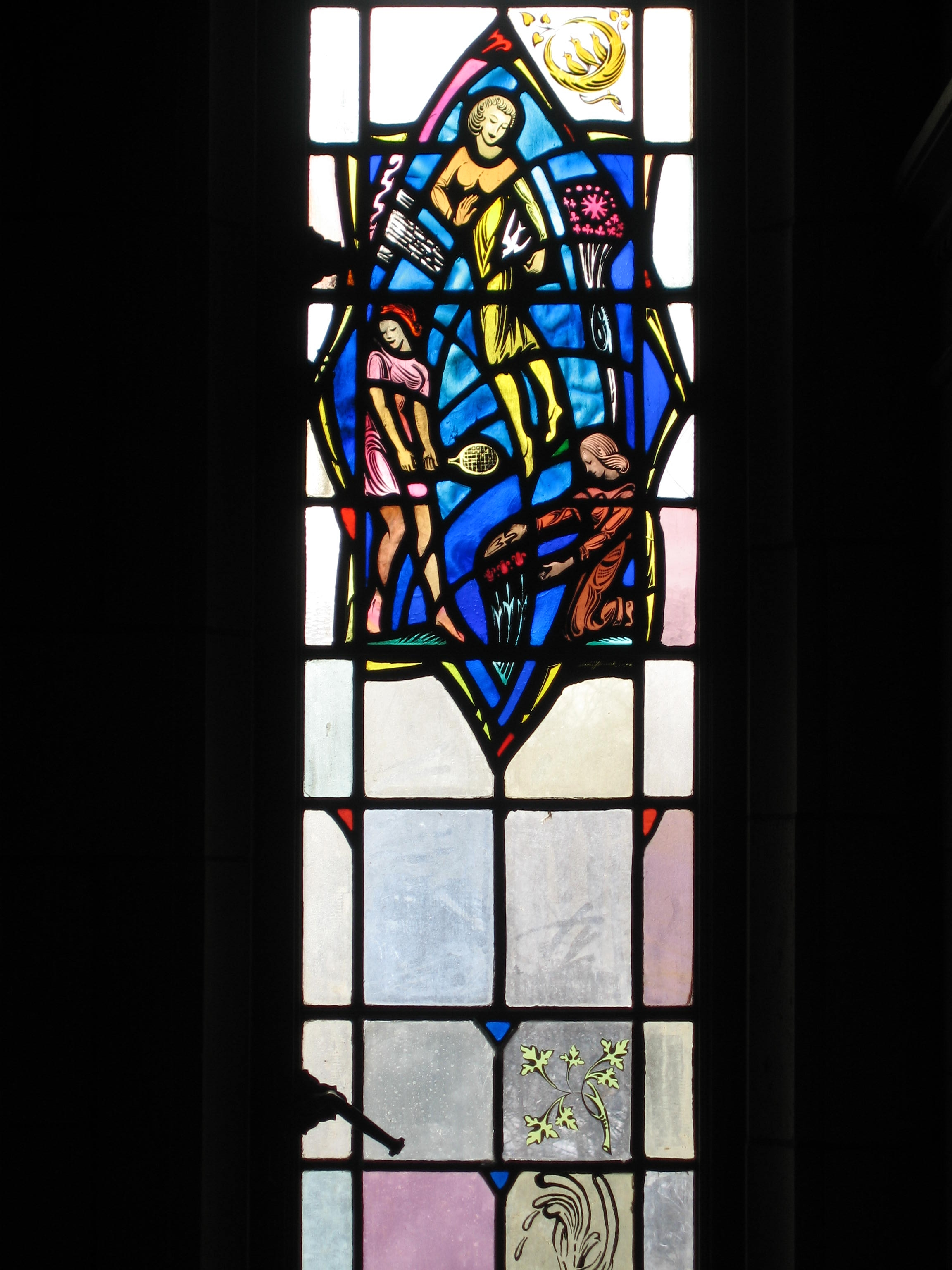
Charles Connick designed Class of 1940 Window in the Quo Vadis niche

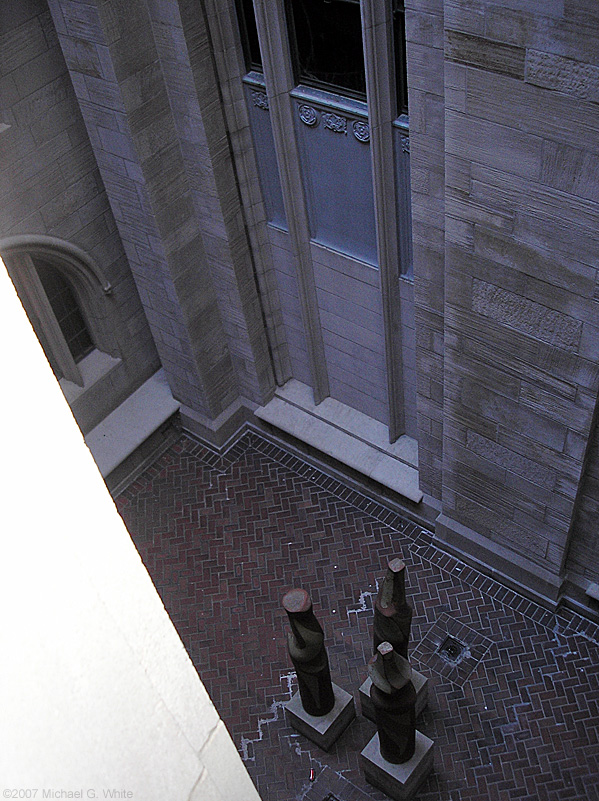
Lightwell containing the painted ceramic sculpture "Third Century" by Jerry Caplan

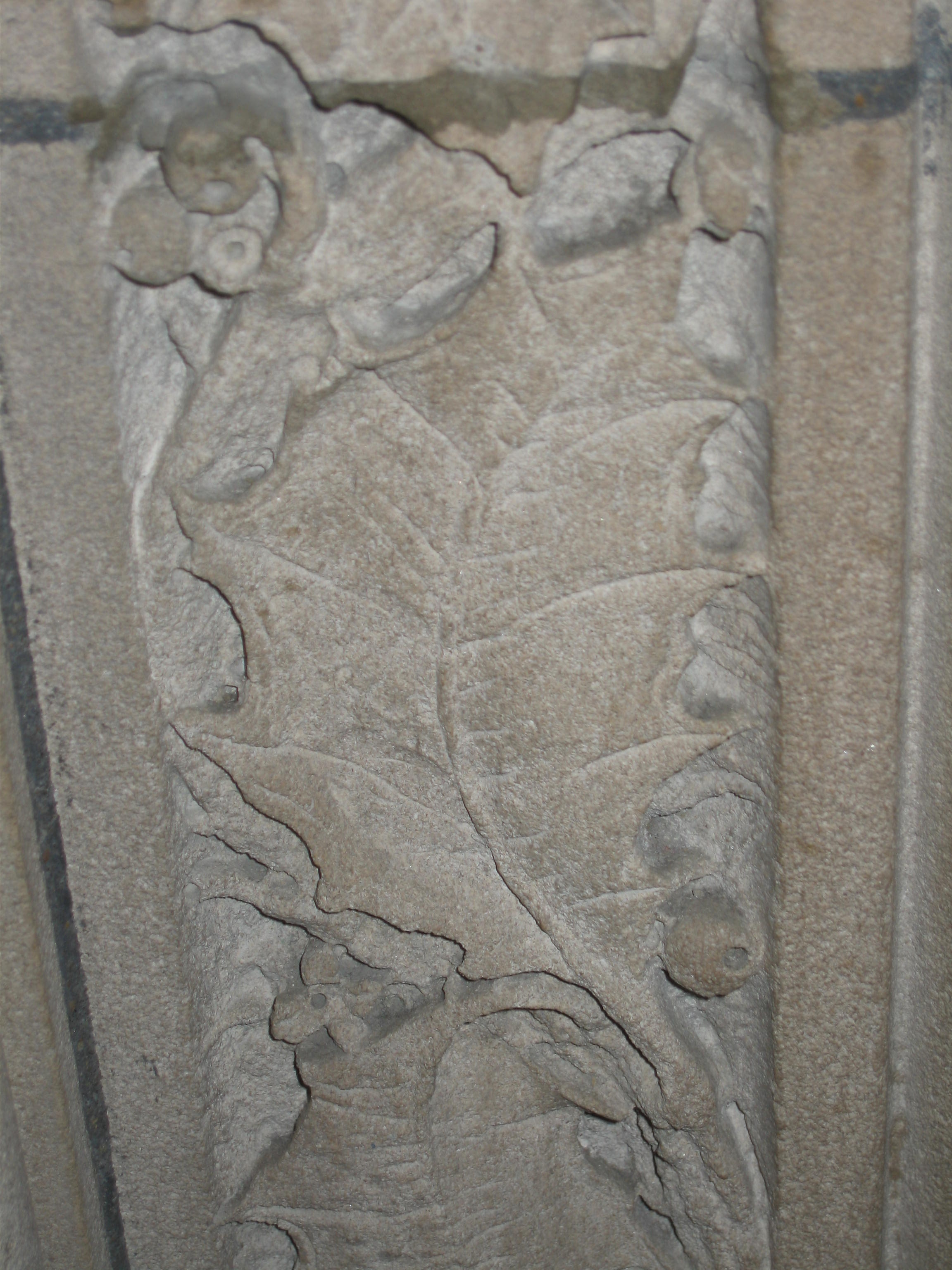
Detail of Joseph Gattoni stonework on a first floor archway

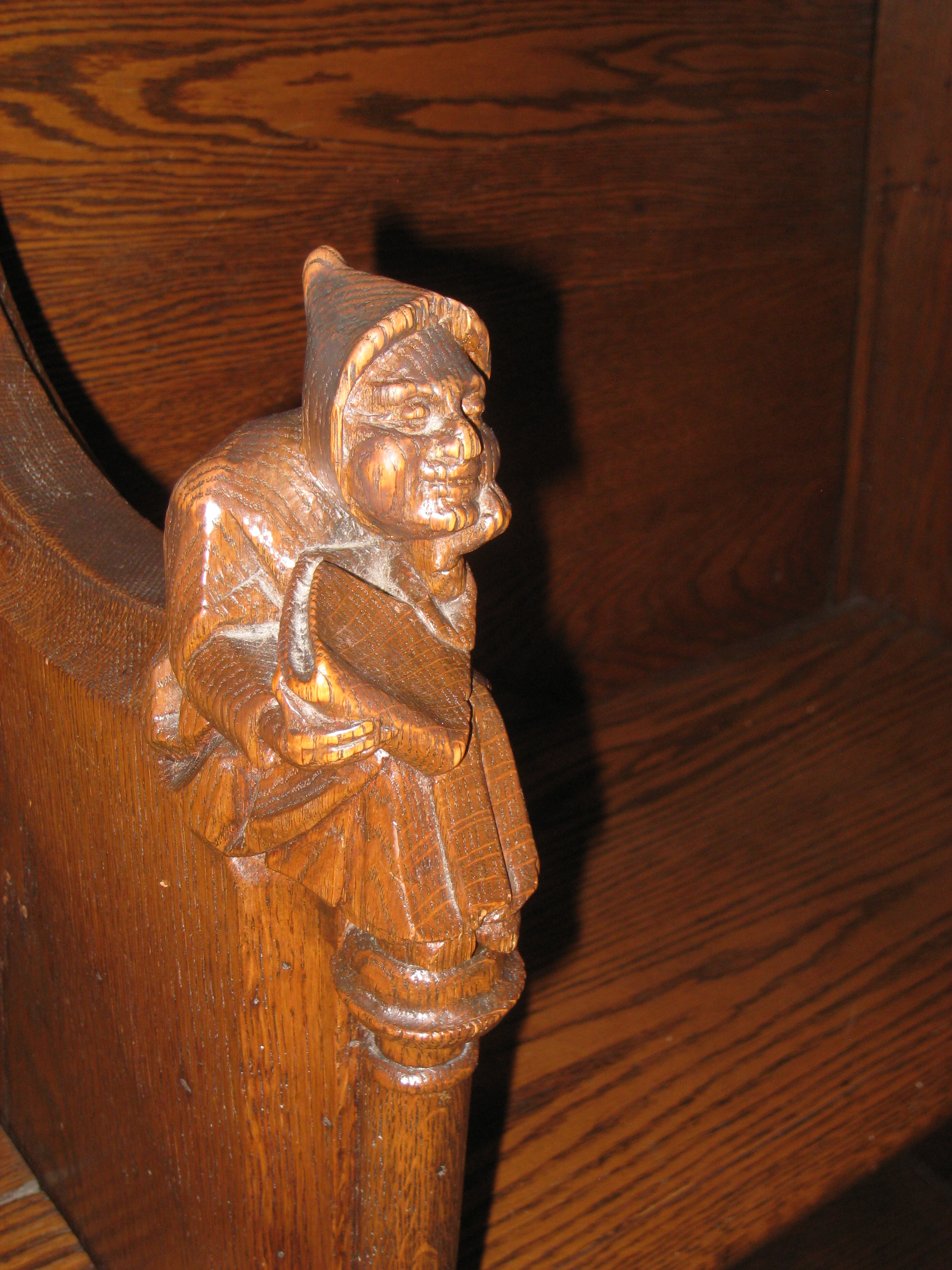
Detail of Commons Room furniture carvings

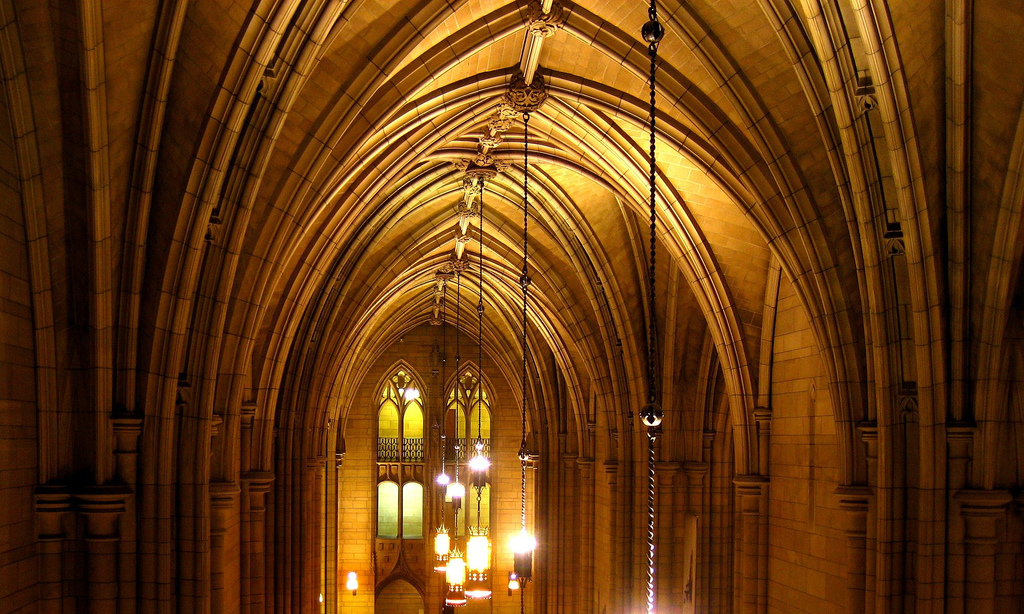
Commons Room ceiling vaults

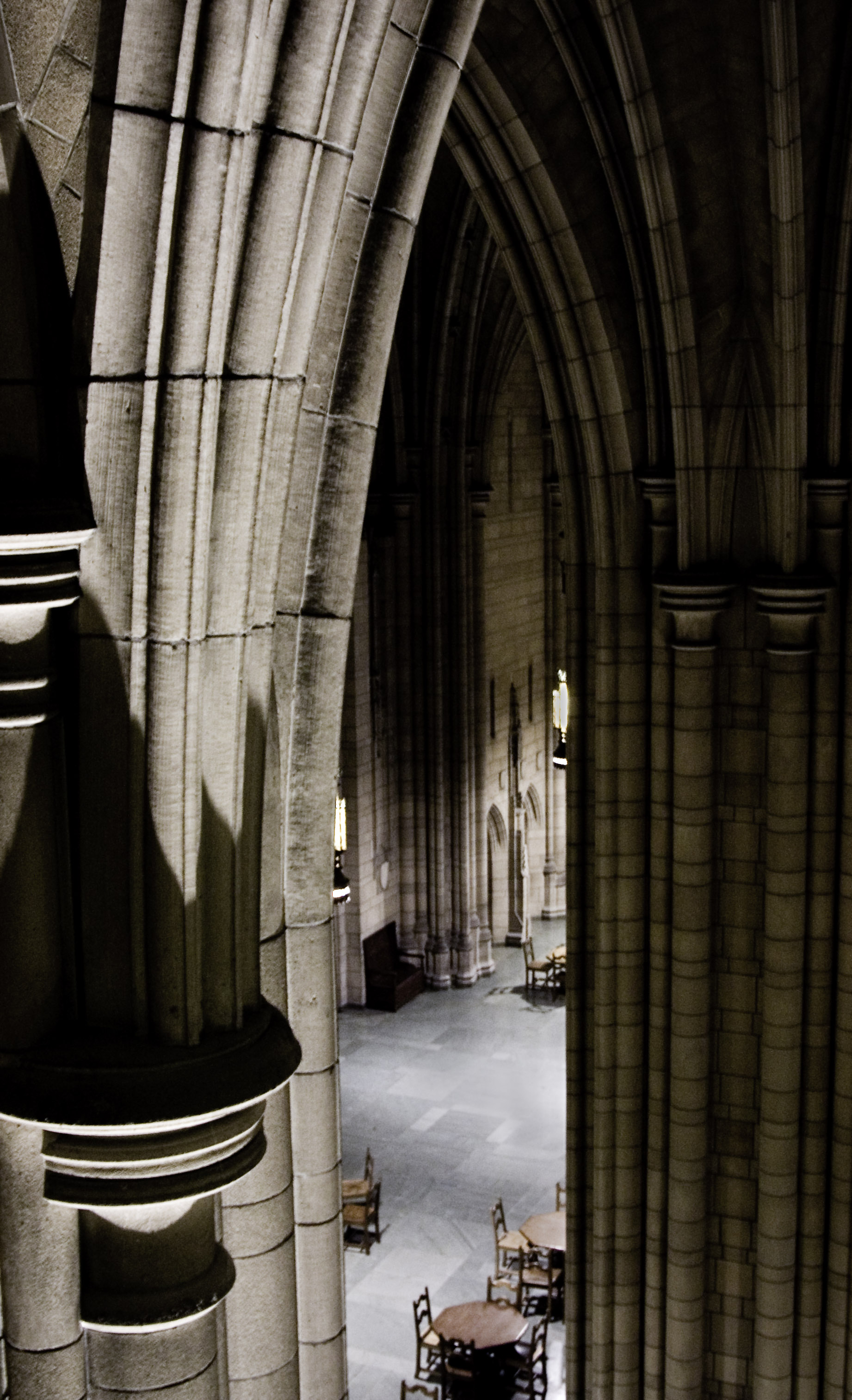
Commons Room

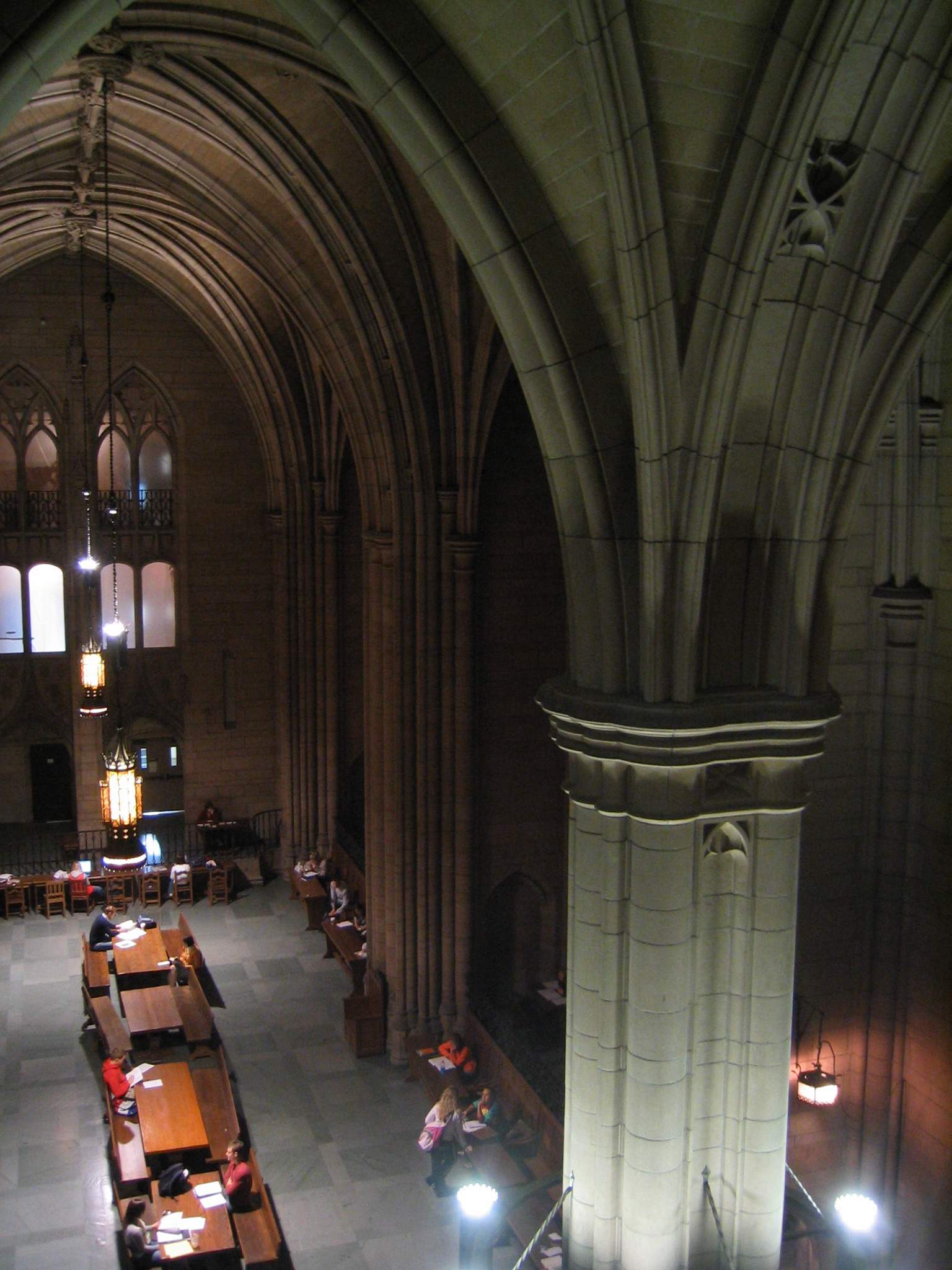
Commons Room

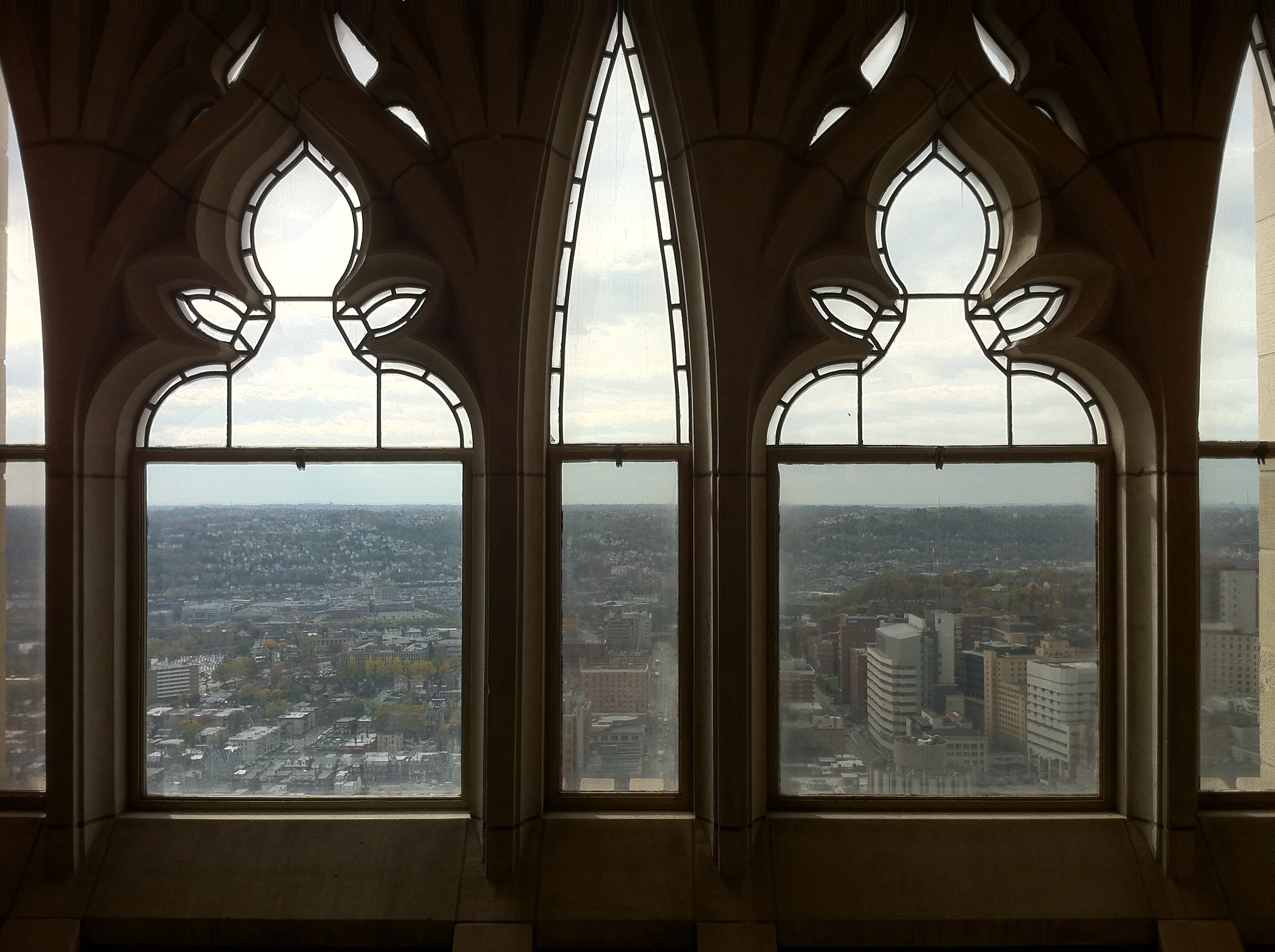
Looking west from the Frederick Honors College

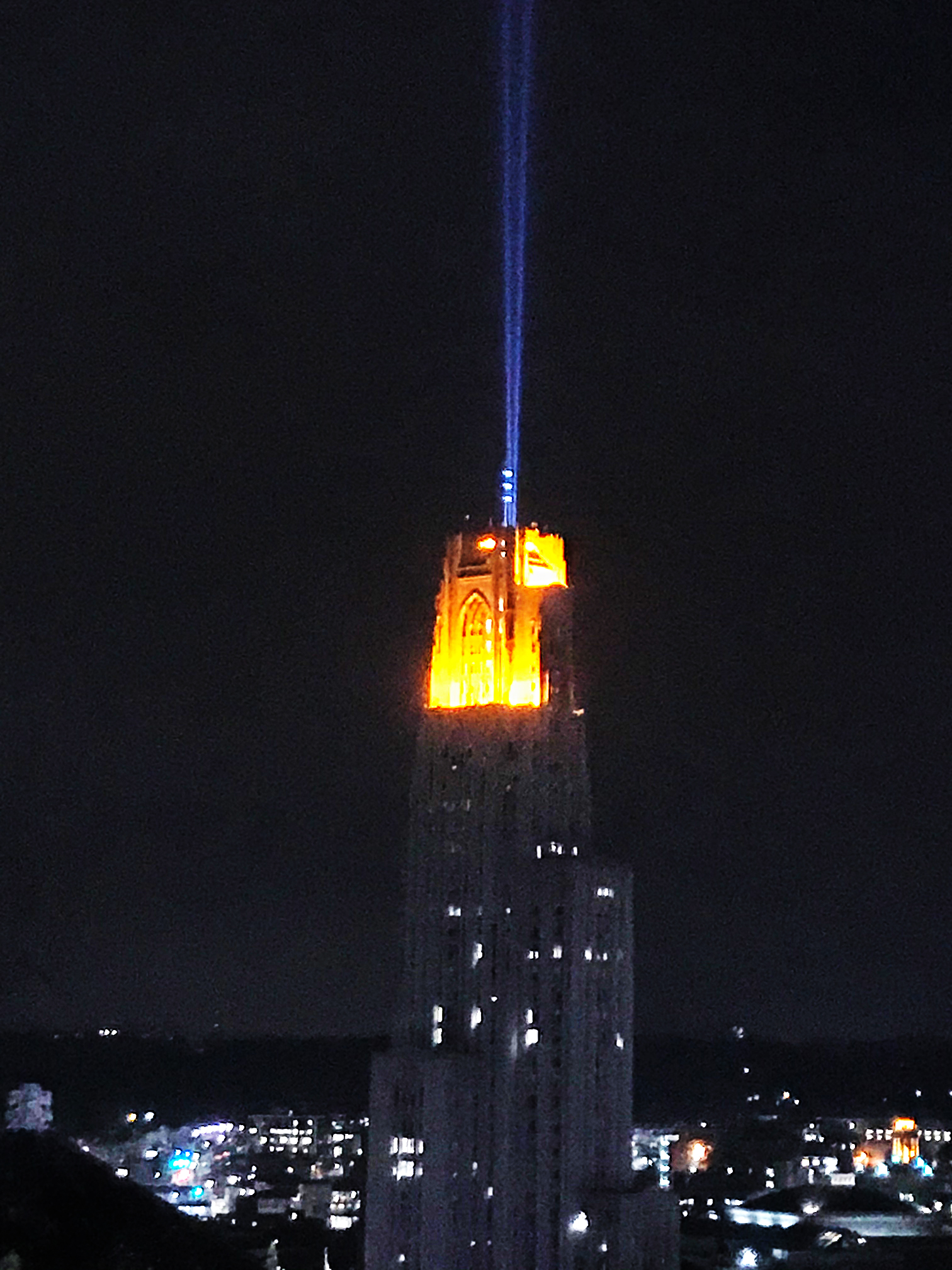
Cathedral of Learning lit up with the victory lights

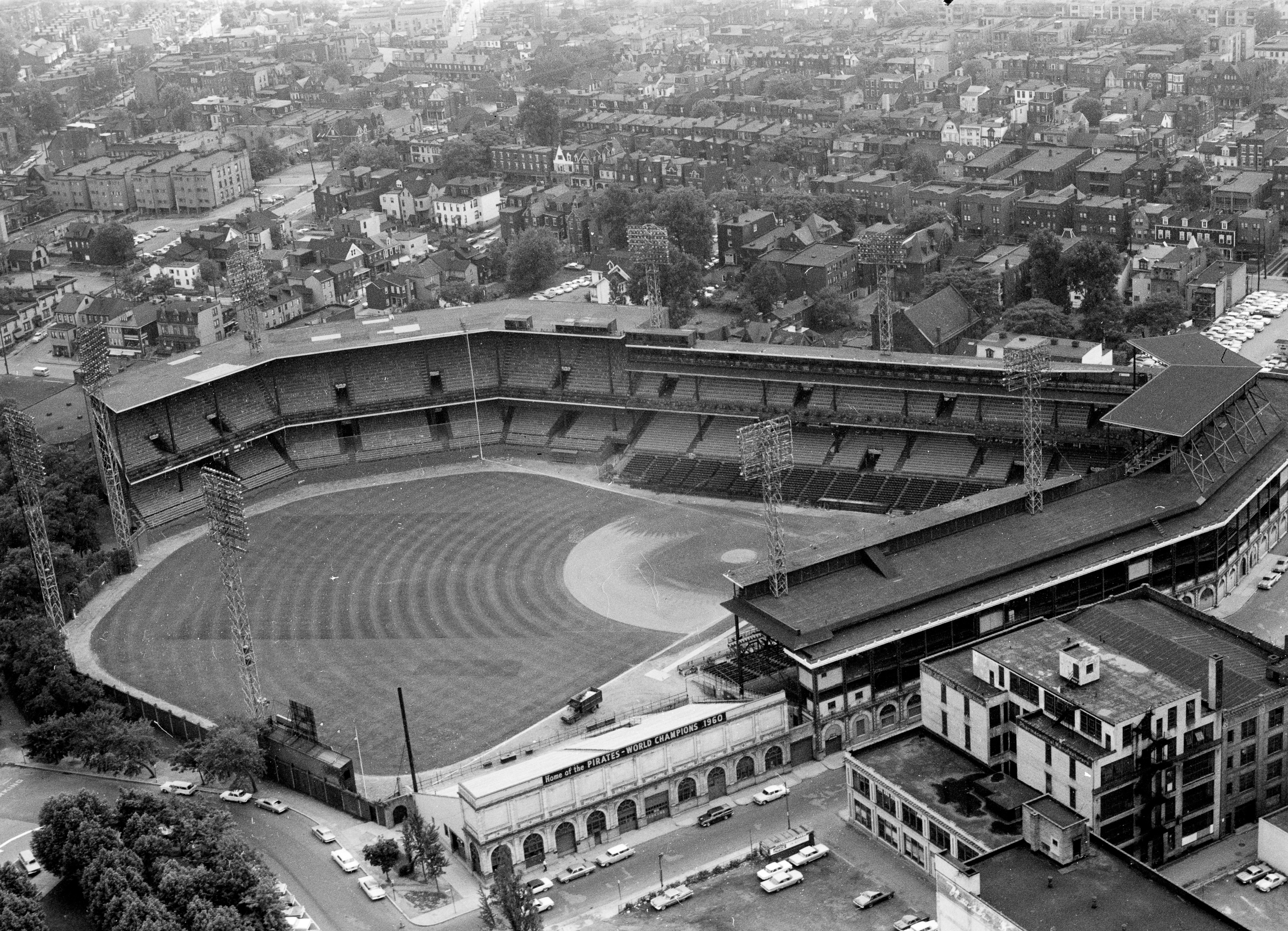
Forbes Field about 1963 from Cathedral of Learning

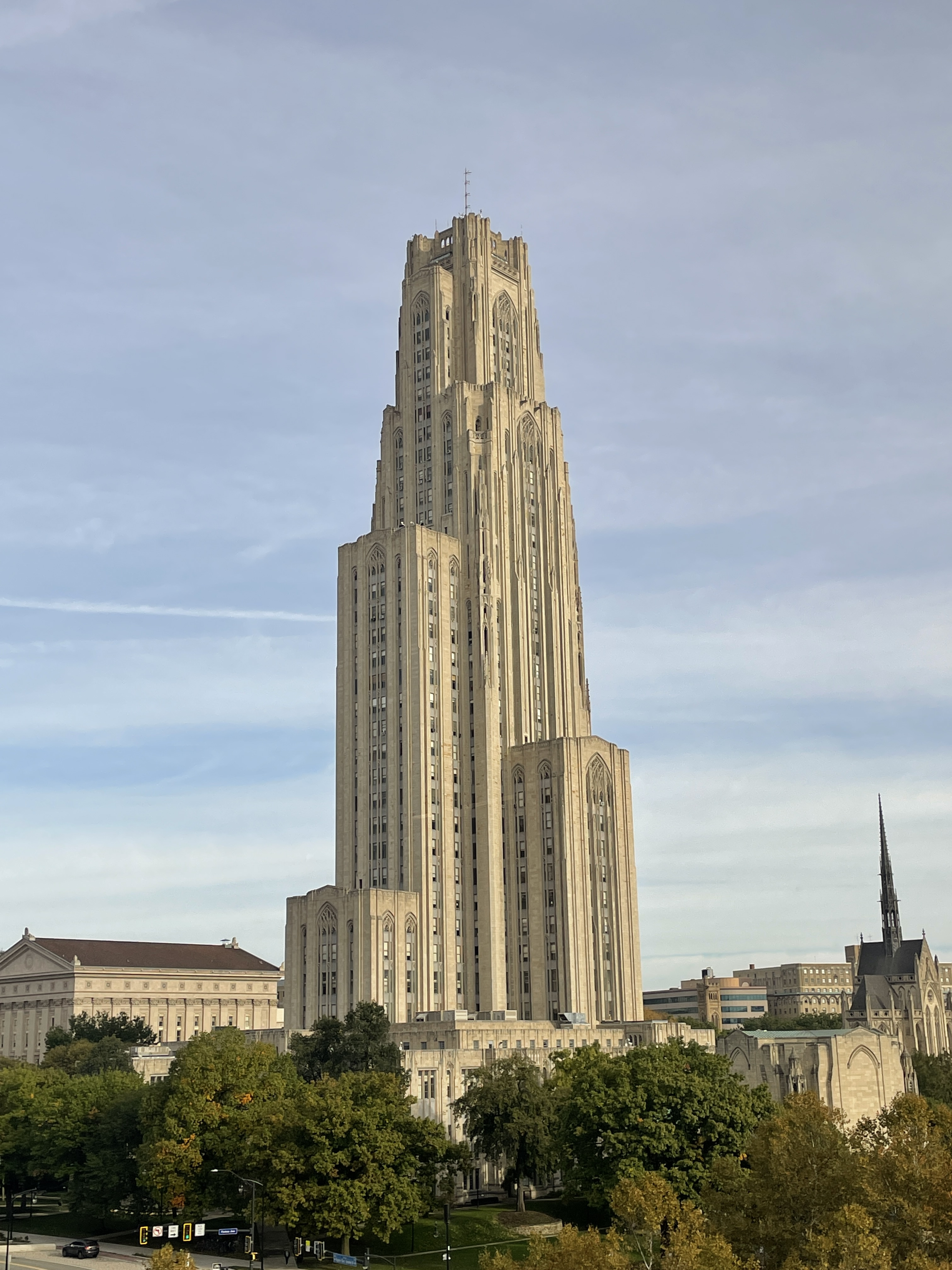
Cathedral seen from Wesley W. Posvar Hall

== Recent proposed changes to the Cathedral ==
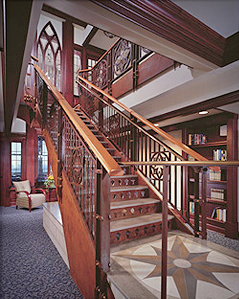
University Honors College on the 35th and 36th floor

In the early 2000s, there was some controversy over whether university funds should be used to illuminate the Cathedral at night, or to clean the building's façade. The cleaning was abandoned because it was too costly. Some Oakland residents spoke out against the cleaning, stating that the years of soot should stay as an homage to Pittsburgh's industrial past. However, the university approved nearly $5 million for cleaning and restoration of stonework on February 28, 2007. The work was completed at the end of 2007, restoring the exterior of the building to its original condition.

In the wake of the September 11 attacks, the cathedral was deemed "at risk" because no obstacles were in place to prevent a vehicle from driving into the entrances of the building. To address this concern, the university installed bollards that rise out of the sidewalk.

As of 2001, around 200 window air conditioners operated in the building. During the 2000s, the university focused upon providing air-conditioning to the first four floors, which contain a number of classrooms. The plan called for the complete central cooling of the entire Cathedral of Learning by the end of the decade.

In 2014 the Property and Facilities Committee approved a plan for a $10.4 million upgrade of the building's elevator system. This is the second major upgrade of the elevators implemented in the building's history. Originally manually controlled and later automated to Westinghouse Selectomatic in 1971, the system was completely modernized into Otis Compass+ destination dispatch in 2016.

== References in popular culture and student life ==
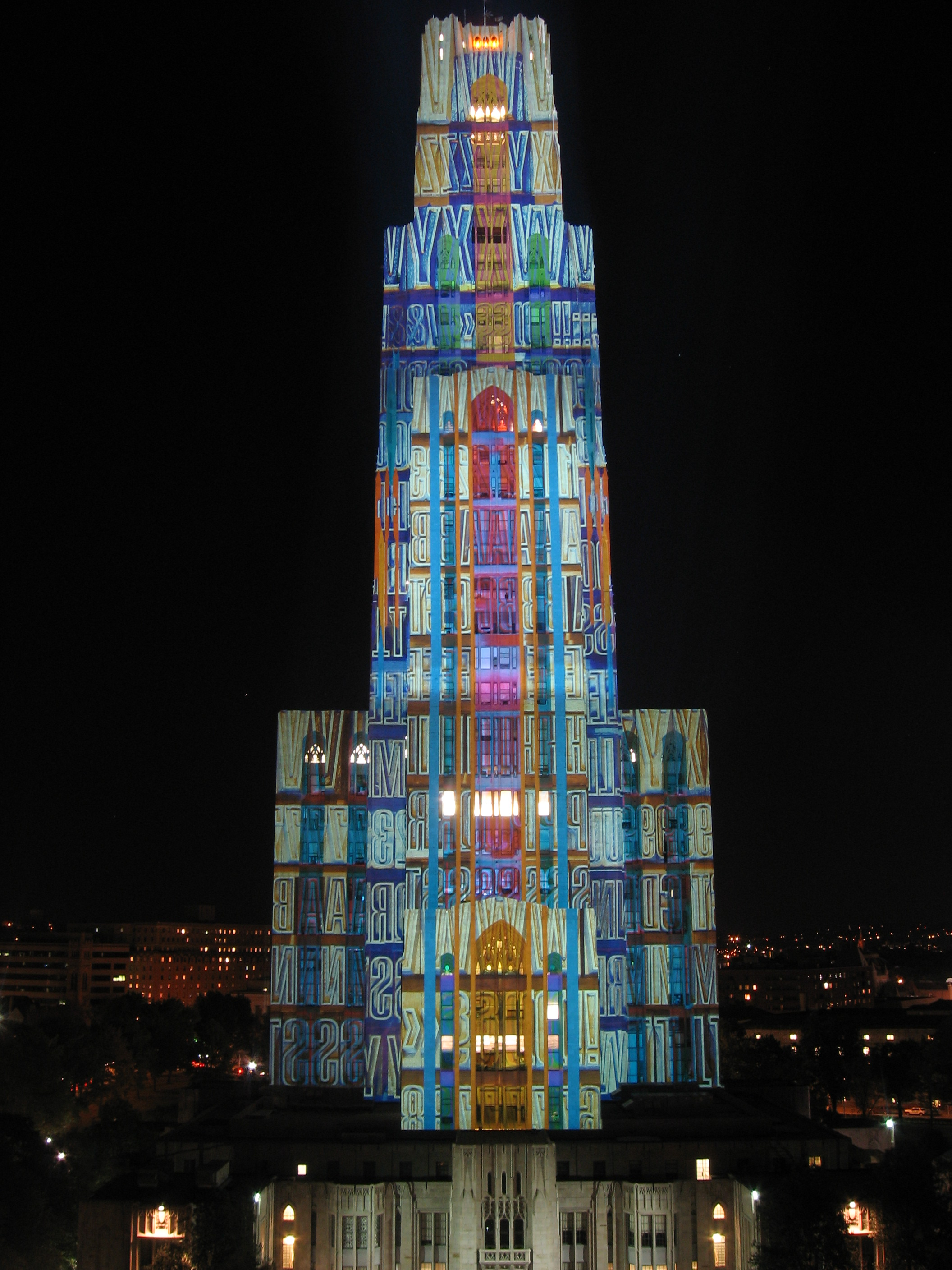
The Cathedral of Learning lit up during the fall of 2008 for the Pittsburgh Festival of Light in celebration of the city of Pittsburgh's 250th anniversary. The mosaic, created by French artist Lucette de Rugy, was inspired by Gutenberg's 15th-century printing press

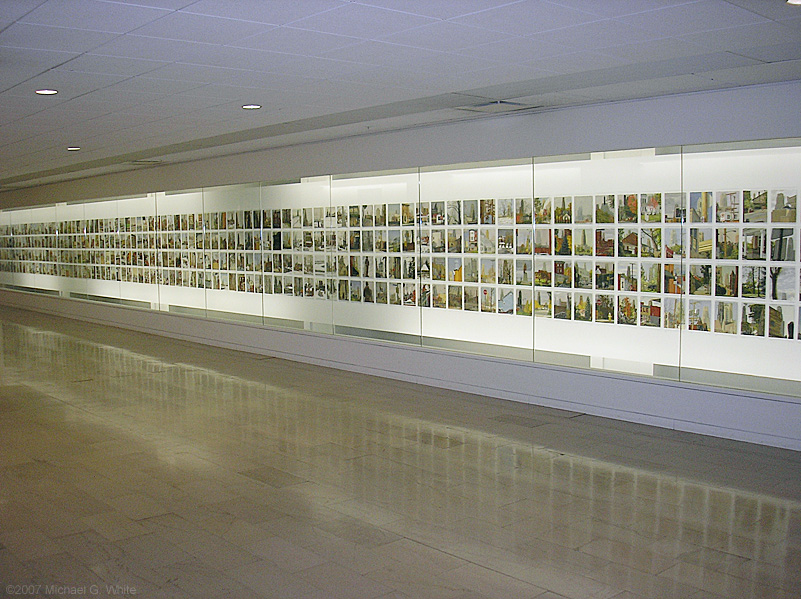
One A Day: 365 Views of the Cathedral of Learning, painted by Felix de la Concha, a permanent exhibit at the University of Pittsburgh's Alumni Hall

- The Cathedral of Learning is described in Michael Chabon's novel The Mysteries of Pittsburgh.
- In Bethesda Softwork's Fallout 3: The Pitt, the Cathedral of Learning appears as the headquarters of the rulers of a post-apocalyptic Pittsburgh.
- The Cathedral of Learning was profiled on John Ratzenberger's Made in America TV show on the Travel Channel.
- The Cathedral of Learning and Nationality Rooms were featured on the Canadian French language travel channel Évasion in the Pittsburgh episode of 15 bonnes raisons d'aller à ... that first aired in September 2012.
- The cathedral is sometimes referred to by Pitt students as the "drunken compass" due to its prominence of visibility throughout the neighborhood of Oakland that is used to guide students returning from parties back to the dorms or apartments.
- Along with the Early American Nationality Room, and the Croghan-Schenley Ballroom, the Cathedral Café food court on the ground level is purported to be haunted.
- Portions of the movie Roommates (1995), starring D. B. Sweeney, Peter Falk, and Julianne Moore and directed by Peter Yates, were filmed in the Cathedral of Learning, including room 324.
- Richard Gere's character in The Mothman Prophecies (2002) appears in a scene where he is sitting on a bench on the Cathedral of Learning lawn.
- The Cathedral of Learning can be seen in the background of the climactic scene in which Jackie Robinson heads for home base at Forbes Field in the biographical film 42 (2013), as well as in the backdrop of the graduation scene, filmed on the lawn of Soldiers and Sailors Memorial, for fictional Rosman University in the movie Sorority Row (2009). It can also be seen in the movie Wonder Boys (2000), a film adaptation of Pitt alumnus Michael Chabon's 1995 novel of the same title, as well as in the original 1951 version of Angels in the Outfield.
- Artist Harry Scheuch painted the Cathedral of Learning during its construction in the 1930s as a series for the Public Works of Art Project. The works are now part of the Smithsonian American Art Museum's exhibit entitled "1934: A New Deal for Artists".
- Artist Felix de la Concha painted the Cathedral of Learning 365 times, in One a Day. 365 Views of the Cathedral of Learning. The collection is now on display at the Alumni Hall (University of Pittsburgh), a building just in front of the cathedral.
- In one of the most famous photographs in baseball history by George Silk and published in Life magazine, students from the University of Pittsburgh are seen cheering on the Pittsburgh Pirates in the 1960 World Series from their vantage atop the Cathedral of Learning high above Forbes Field.
- Assumption University in Thailand has constructed a 39-story, 522-foot (159 m) building that is modeled and named after the Cathedral of Learning and serves as the centerpiece of their Suvarnabhumi campus.
- The Cathedral of Learning features in Chris Kuzneski's 2009 novel, The Prophecy.
- On October 27, 2018, the cathedral was darkened following Pitt's victory over Duke out of respect for the 11 victims killed in the Tree of Life synagogue shooting which had occurred earlier that day in nearby Squirrel Hill.
- The Cathedral of Learning features in the song "Cathy" by Dhyan, released in 2019 as a single, from the album My Hero.
- In 1987, the Cathedral of Learning appears in a panel of The Amazing Spider-Man issue 292, where Spider-Man goes to Pittsburgh.

== Notes ==
Preceded by Bellefield Hall	University of Pittsburgh buildings Cathedral of Learning; Constructed: 1926-1937	Succeeded by Falk School
Preceded by 525 William Penn Place	Pittsburgh Skyscrapers by Height; 535 feet (163 m); 42 floors	Succeeded by Tower at PNC Plaza
Preceded by Gulf Tower	Pittsburgh Skyscrapers by Year of Completion; 1936	Succeeded by 525 William Penn Place
