= Bryan Camp =

Bryan Camp may refer to:

- Federal Prison Camp, Bryan, a minimum-security United States federal prison for female inmates in Texas
- Bryan Camp (academic), American legal scholar
