= Bryan Camp (academic) =

American legal scholar

Academic background
- Education: Haverford College (BA); University of Virginia (MA, JD); Columbia University (LLM)

Academic work
- Discipline: Tax law · legal history · statutory interpretation · civil procedure
- Institutions: Internal Revenue Service; Texas Tech University

Bryan Camp is an American legal scholar and the George H. Mahon Professor of Law at Texas Tech University.

== Education ==
Camp earned a Bachelor of Arts degree from Haverford College in 1982, a Master of Arts in legal history from the University of Virginia, a Juris Doctor from the University of Virginia School of Law, and a Master of Laws from the Columbia Law School.

== Career ==
Prior to joining Texas Tech in 2001, Camp worked as an assistant county attorney for Arlington County, Virginia. He also litigated child abuse cases for a local child welfare agency. Camp also served in the Internal Revenue Service, where he worked in the chief counsel's office during drafting of the Internal Revenue Service Restructuring and Reform Act of 1998.

Camp's article on protecting trust assets from the federal tax lien was selected as the Outstanding Law Review article for 2009. He is an expert on bankruptcy law, tax law, statutory interpretation, constitutional law and jurisprudence. He has authored articles for the Florida Law Review, Hastings Law Journal, Indiana Law Journal, Virginia Tax Review, Washington and Lee Law Review, Duke Law Journal, American Bankruptcy Institute Law Review, The Green Bag, the Pittsburgh Tax Review, the American Journal of Legal History, and others.
