= Pittsburgh Journal of Environmental and Public Health Law =

- Discipline: Law review
- Language: English

Publication details
- History: 2006-2014
- Publisher: University Library System, University of Pittsburgh (United States)
- Frequency: Biannual
- Open access: Yes
- License: Creative Commons Attribution-Noncommercial-No Derivative Works 3.0 United States

Standard abbreviations
- Bluebook: Pitt. J. Envtl. L. & Pub. Health L.
- ISO 4: Pittsburgh J. Environ. Public Health Law

Indexing
- ISSN: 2164-7976

Links
- Journal homepage; Online archive

The Pittsburgh Journal of Environmental and Public Health Law was a law review edited by an independent student group at University of Pittsburgh School of Law, focusing on environmental law and public health. The journal was established in 2006 and was published annually by the University Library System (University of Pittsburgh) as part of its D-Scribe Digital Publishing program. Three issues were produced in 2011 and the journal became biannual after that. The last issue appeared in 2014. The journal is abstracted and indexed in HeinOnline.
