= University of Pittsburgh School of Law =

Public law school in Pittsburgh, Pennsylvania, US

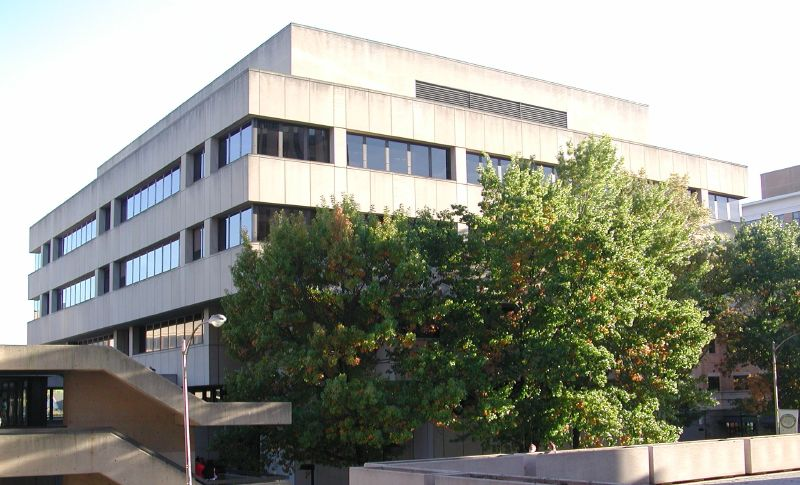
- Barco Law Building
- Parent school: University of Pittsburgh
- Established: 1895
- School type: Public law school
- Dean: Jerry Dickinson
- Location: Pittsburgh, Pennsylvania, United States; 40.441885°N 79.955707°W
- Enrollment: 400
- Faculty: 86 full-time faculty
- USNWR ranking: 79th (tie) (2025)
- Website: www.law.pitt.edu

The University of Pittsburgh School of Law (Pitt Law) is the law school of the University of Pittsburgh, a public research university in Pittsburgh, Pennsylvania. It was founded in 1895 and became a charter member of the Association of American Law Schools in 1900. Its primary home facility is the Barco Law Building. The school offers four degrees: the Juris Doctor (JD), Master of Laws (LLM), Master of Studies in Law (MSLS), and Doctor of Juridical Science (JSD). The school also offers several international legal programs, operates a variety of clinics, and publishes several law journals.

According to University of Pittsburgh School of Law's 2021 ABA-required disclosures, 87% of graduates were employed ten months after graduation with 65% attaining positions where bar admission is required.

== History ==
Home of law school from 1897 to 1919

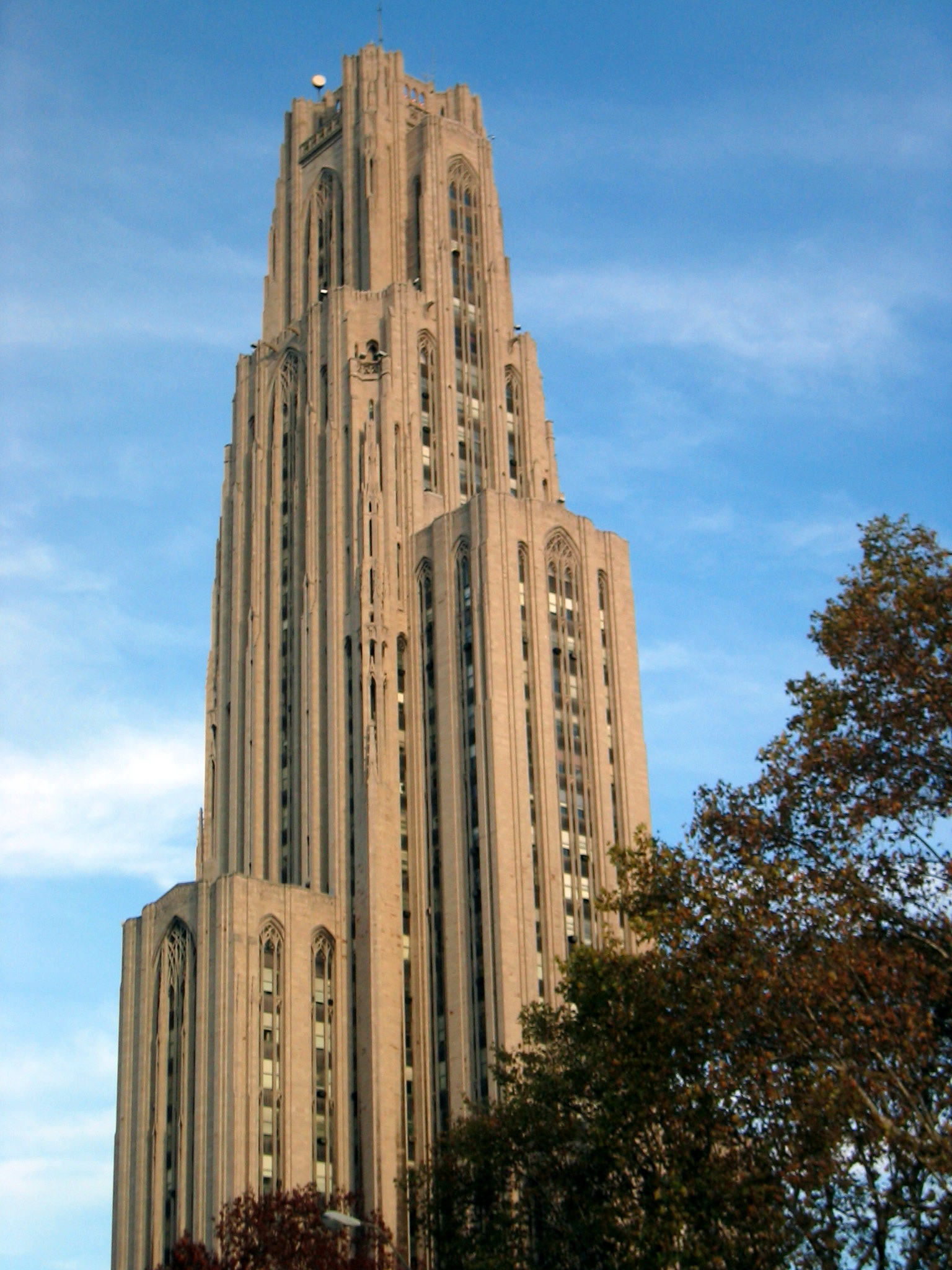
The Cathedral of Learning housed the law school from 1936 to 1976

The law department was founded in 1843 and is one of 17 schools constituting the University of Pittsburgh. The first four law degrees were conferred in 1847. Classes were held in a stone building at Third Street until the building was destroyed in the fire of 1845 and were then held in the university's building on Duquesne Way until that building was burned in 1849. Classes were continued after the second fire in the basement of the Third Presbyterian Church until the universities first law professor, Walter H. Lowrie, was elected to the Supreme Court of Pennsylvania in 1851 and forced him to abandon his teaching at the school. This, along with the fires that destroyed many of the university's facilities and resources, disrupted the development of the School of Law.

Although various attempts were made to reestablish law instruction beginning in 1862, a permanent law school was not established until 1895. The university at that time was named the Western University of Pennsylvania, but despite this, the law school was originally named the Pittsburgh Law School, a name it held until 1918. The Pittsburgh Law School became a charter member of the Association of American Law Schools in 1900.

The first classes in the permanently established school were conducted in the orphans' court rooms in the old Allegheny County courthouse. In 1897, the school moved into the old university building at Ross and Diamond streets that had been sold to the county in 1882. The school moved again in 1919-20 to the tenth floor of the Chamber of Commerce building. In 1936 the School of Law moved in its entirety to the 14-16 floors of the Cathedral of Learning on the main campus of the university located in the Oakland neighborhood of Pittsburgh.

Robert Lee Vann became the first African American to graduate from Pitt Law in 1909. The first African-American woman didn't graduate until Martha Richards Conley did it in 1971. Robert Beckley Harper was the first African American faculty member in 1976 when he became an Assistant Professor of Law. In 1982, Harper also became the first African American to earn tenure at Pitt Law.

During the 1950s and 1960s, the School of Law's Health Law Center was an early pioneer in the field now known as computer-assisted legal research (CALR). Attorney and researcher John Horty was astounded by the extent to which the laws governing hospital administration varied from one state to the next across the United States, and began building a computer database to help him keep track of it all. News of Horty's pioneering work at Pitt inspired the Ohio State Bar Association (just across the state line in nearby Ohio) to create its own separate CALR system, the ancestor of the database system known today as LexisNexis. The School of Law moved into their own dedicated facility, the Barco Law Building, upon its opening on the university's main campus in 1976.

=== Deans ===
- John Douglass Shafer, 1895–1920
- Alexander Marshall Thompson, 1920–1940
- Eugene Allen Gilmore, 1940–1942
- Judson Adams Crane, 1942–1949
- Charles Bernard Nutting, 1949–1951
- Judson Adams Crane (Acting Dean), 1951–1952
- Brainerd Currie, 1952–1953
- Arthur Larson (on leave of absence 1954–56), 1953–1956
- Charles Wilson Taintor II (Acting Dean), 1954–1957
- Thomas McIntyre Cooley II, 1957–1965
- William Edward Sell, Chairman, Administrative Committee, 1965–1966; Dean, 1966–1977
- John E. Murray Jr., 1977–1984
- Richard J. Pierce Jr., 1984–1985
- Mark A. Nordenberg, 1985–1993 (University Chancellor, 1995–2014)
- Richard H. Seeburger (Interim Dean), 1993–1994
- Peter M. Shane, 1994–1998
- David J. Herring, 1998–2005
- Mary A. Crossley, 2005–2012
- William M. Carter Jr., 2012–2018
- Amy J. Wildermuth, 2018–2023
- Mary Crossley (Interim Dean), 2023-2025
- Jerry Dickinson, 2025-present

== Facilities ==
- Barco Law Building - Pitt Law School is housed in the six-story Barco Law Building on Forbes Avenue, located on the main campus of the University of Pittsburgh.
- Barco Law Library - The Law Library is housed on the third, fourth, and fifth floors of the Barco Law Building. The library was renovated in 2004, and the current collection numbers some 450,000 volumes and volume equivalents and has a seating capacity, in both the individual carrels and in private reading areas, of over 400. In addition, located within several blocks of the Law Building are Hillman Library, Carnegie Library of Pittsburgh, and several special libraries of the University, including the business, medical, and public and international affairs libraries.
- Teplitz Memorial Moot Courtroom - Located on the ground floor, the moot courtroom, named for the late Benjamin H. Teplitz, includes a seven-seat judges' bench, jury and press boxes, counselors' tables, judges' chambers, and a jury room. It is used primarily by trial tactics classes and by the growing number of moot court programs. It is equipped to handle special sessions of the Commonwealth and Federal Appellate Courts and hearings before various administrative tribunals.
- Other design features of the Law Building include a pedestrian bridge connecting the School of Law with Litchfield Towers dormitories, Lawrence Hall, and Wesley W. Posvar Hall.

== Academics ==
The University of Pittsburgh School of Law offers four degrees. The J.D. (Juris Doctor) is the required degree to practice law in most of the United States, thus J.D. students make up most of the school's student body.

=== Academic programs ===
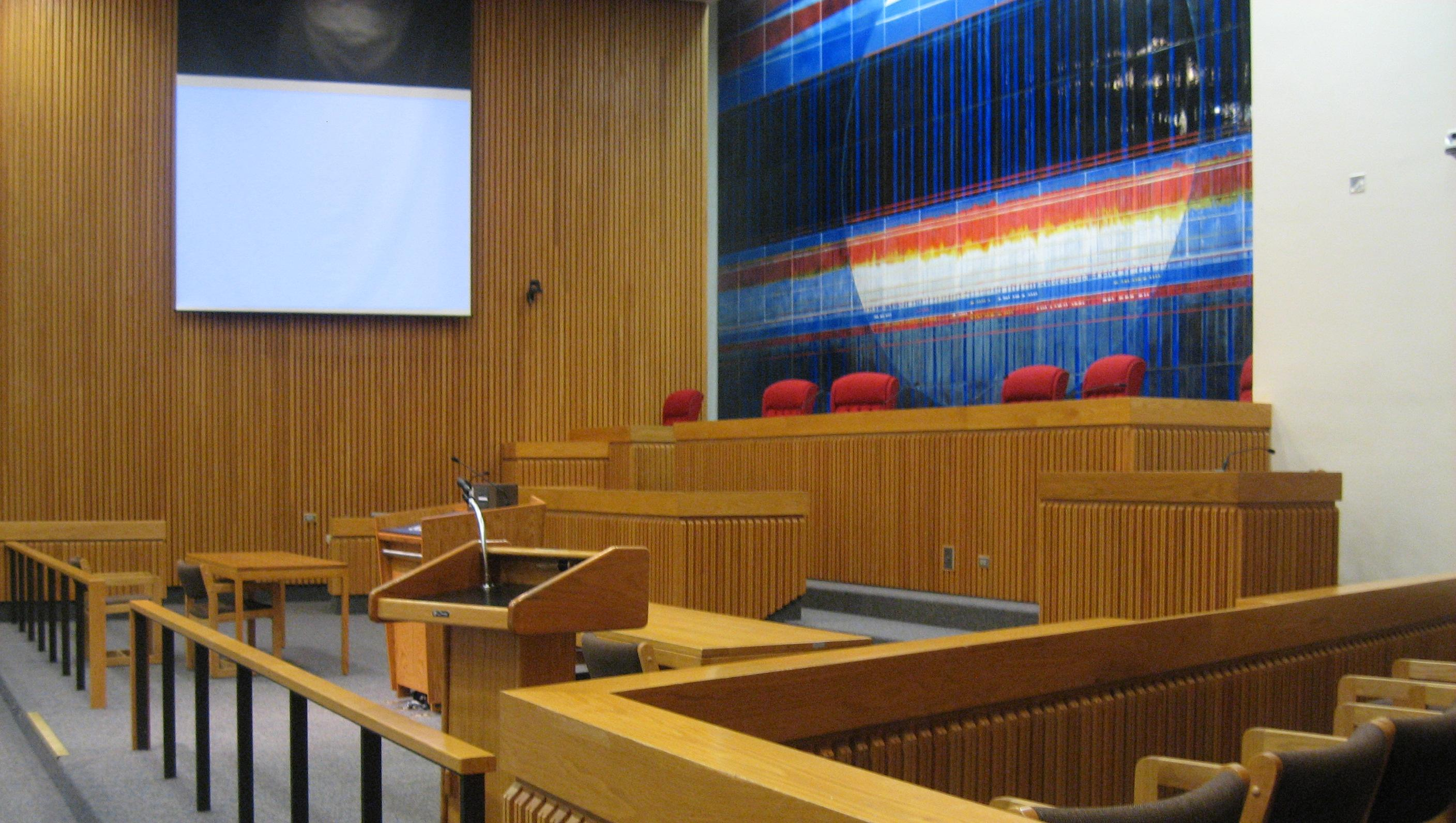
View of the bench and jury box from the gallery area of the Teplitz Memorial Moot Courtroom

- The John P. Gismondi Civil Litigation Certificate Program
- Environmental Law, Science and Policy
- Health Law
- Intellectual Property and Technology Law
- International and Comparative Law
- Disability Studies
- Law and Entrepreneurship
- Washington, D.C. Externship Program

=== Pitt Law Center for International Legal Education ===
Pitt Law offers area studies in the following international legal systems:

- Asian Studies
- Global Studies
- Latin American Studies
- Russia and Eastern European Studies
- Western European Studies

These area studies serve to supplement the study of International Law, in addition to providing Pitt Law students with the opportunity to pursue careers abroad.

=== Experiential skills programs ===
==== Clinics ====
The University of Pittsburgh School of Law has several clinical programs, which allow law students to gain practical experience as lawyers before graduating from law school. The following clinics are currently offered by the School of Law:

- Tax Clinic
- Securities Arbitration Clinic
- Family Law Clinic
- Environmental Law Clinic
- Health Law Clinic
- Elder Law Clinic
- Immigration Law Clinic

==== Lawyering Skills Competitions ====
The law school also hosts and facilitates multiple moot court and lawyering skills competitions for law students. The law school's Moot Court Board administers three intramural competitions each year: the Appellate Moot Court Competition, the Murray S. Love Trial Moot Court Competition, and the Negotiations Competition. The school also assembles teams to compete at multiple interscholastic and international moot court competitions covering specialized areas such as Energy Law, Environmental Law, Health Law, International Arbitration and International Law, Workers' Compensation Law, Client Counseling, and Intellectual Property. The school's Mock Trial Program recruits adjunct coaches from the local practicing bar to assemble law student teams to participate in mock trial competitions throughout the country. In 2014-2015, more than 20% of second- and third-year students participated in an interscholastic competition.

==== Semester in D.C. Program ====
The law school's Semester in D.C. Program allows spring semester second- and third-year students to pursue a full-time externship for an employer in Washington, D.C. The Semester in D.C. combines full-time work for academic credit with a small seminar class held at the law school's dedicated Washington Center to fulfill a full semester credit load. Students can also pursue a Public Policy Concentration, taking additional courses to learn to apply legal advocacy, research, and writing skills in the policy context.

=== Publications ===
==== Journals ====
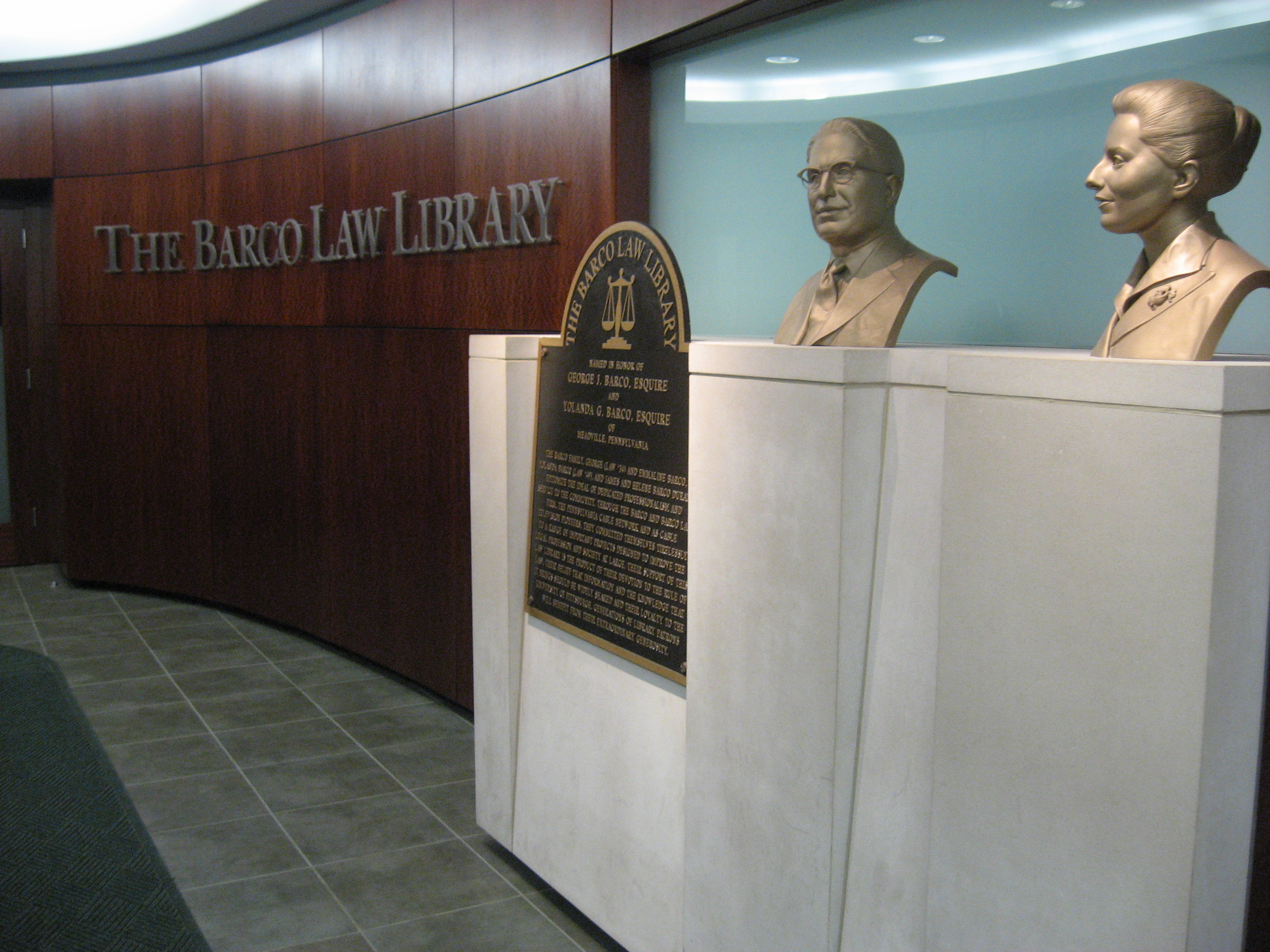
Barco Law Library

Pitt Law is home to two law reviews and several student-edited legal journals, including the Pittsburgh Law Review, which is one of the 40 most-cited law reviews in the country, according to Chicago-Kent Law Review's 1996 Faculty Scholarship Survey. The following law reviews are all publications of the University of Pittsburgh School of Law:

- University of Pittsburgh Law Review
- Journal of Law and Commerce

The following journals are all publications of the University of Pittsburgh School of Law:

- Pittsburgh Tax Review
- Pittsburgh Journal of Technology Law & Policy
- Pittsburgh Journal of Environmental and Public Health Law (ceased publication in 2024)

==== JURIST ====
JURIST is the world's only law school-based comprehensive legal news and research service. Its professionally trained staff of law faculty and law students report and research the latest legal developments in real time for members of the legal community and the public at large. JURIST covers legal news stories based on their substantive importance rather than on their mass-market or commercial appeal.

== Applicant Information ==
=== Admissions ===
Admissions to the University of Pittsburgh School of Law are conducted on a rolling basis, with an acceptance rate of slightly less than 30%. For the entering class of 2019, the median LSAT score was 158, and the median GPA was 3.49. There were 120 entering students.

Admissions Statistics for the University of Pittsburgh School of Law

| Year | Enrolled | Applications | LSAT - Median | GPA - Median | LSAT - 25th | LSAT - 75th | GPA - 25th | GPA - 75th |
|---|---|---|---|---|---|---|---|---|
| 2019 | 120 | 1,196 | 158 | 3.49 | 155 | 160 | 3.22 | 3.71 |
| 2018 | 130 | 1,832 | 157 | 3.39 | 154 | 159 | 3.09 | 3.60 |
| 2017 | 141 | 1,713 | 156 | 3.42 | 152 | 158 | 3.11 | 3.62 |
| 2016 | 140 | 1,341 | 156 | 3.42 | 152 | 159 | 3.12 | 3.64 |
| 2015 | 134 | 1,401 | 156 | 3.36 | 153 | 159 | 3.03 | 3.63 |
| 2014 | 156 | 1,172 | 157 | 3.46 | 152 | 160 | 3.09 | 3.68 |
| 2013 | 174 | 1,487 | 158 | 3.42 | 154 | 161 | 3.16 | 3.61 |
| 2012 | 210 | 1,973 | 158 | 3.34 | 155 | 160 | 3.09 | 3.60 |

=== Costs and financial aid ===
The estimated cost of attendance (includes tuition, fees, books, and living expenses) at Pitt Law for the 2014-15 academic year is $50,008 for a Pennsylvania resident and $57,492 for a non-resident. The average law school debt for the graduating Class of 2012 was $94,879, well below the national average. Pitt Law was one of only 53 law schools out of over 200 nationally (and one of only three in Pennsylvania) to be ranked as a 2014 Best Value by The National Jurist. The survey took into account multiple factors, with success in job placement weighted most heavily at 35%, followed by tuition (25%), average indebtedness (15%), bar passage rates (15%), and cost of living (10%).

=== Employment ===
ABA Employment Summary for 2020 Graduates
| Employment Status | Percentage |
| Employed - Bar Passage Required | 75% |
| Employed - J.D. Advantage | 14.2% |
| Employed - Professional | 2.5% |
| Employed - Non-Professional | 1.7% |
| Unemployed - Seeking | 2.5% |
| Other | 4.1% |
Total of 120 Graduates

ABA Employment for 2020 Graduates by Sector
| Employment Sector | Percentage |
| Law Firms - 101+ Attorneys | 28.3% |
| Law Firms - <101 Attorneys | 31.9% |
| Law Firms - Solo | 0% |
| Business and Industry | 12.4% |
| Clerkships - Federal | 1.8% |
| Clerkships - State/Local | 3.5% |
| Government/Public Interest | 22.1% |
| Education/Other | 3.5% |
Total of 113 Employed Graduates
