= 2020 United States House of Representatives elections in Pennsylvania =

- November 3, 2020

All 18 Pennsylvania seats to the United States House of Representatives
	Majority party	Minority party
Party	Republican	Democratic
Last election	9	9
Seats won	9	9
Seat change	Steady	Steady
Popular vote	3,432,595	3,346,712
Percentage	50.63%	49.37%
Swing	▲5.88%	▼5.66%

Republican hold Democratic hold
Republican
50–60%
60–70%
70–80%
80–90%
Democratic
50–60%
60–70%
70–80%
80–90%
>90%

The 2020 United States House of Representatives elections in Pennsylvania were held on November 3, 2020, to elect the 18 U.S. representatives from the state of Pennsylvania, one from each of the state's 18 congressional districts. The state's primary election occurred on June 2, 2020. The elections coincided with the 2020 U.S. presidential election, as well as other elections to the House of Representatives, elections to the United States Senate and various state and local elections.

== Overview ==
=== Statewide ===
Popular vote
Republican	50.63%
Democratic	49.37%

House seats
Republican	50.00%
Democratic	50.00%

=== District ===
Results of the 2020 United States House of Representatives elections in Pennsylvania by district:

District	Republican		Democratic		Total		Result
District	Votes	%	Votes	%	Votes	%	Result
District 1	249,804	56.56%	191,875	43.44%	441,679	100.0%	Republican hold
District 2	75,022	27.46%	198,140	72.54%	273,162	100.0%	Democratic hold
District 3	33,671	8.97%	341,708	91.03%	375,379	100.0%	Democratic hold
District 4	179,926	40.47%	264,637	59.53%	444,563	100.0%	Democratic hold
District 5	139,552	35.3%	255,743	64.7%	395,295	100.0%	Democratic hold
District 6	177,526	43.95%	226,440	56.05%	403,966	100.0%	Democratic hold
District 7	181,407	47.87%	195,475	52.13%	376,882	100.0%	Democratic hold
District 8	165,783	48.22%	178,004	51.78%	343,787	100.0%	Democratic hold
District 9	232,988	66.33%	118,266	33.67%	351,254	100.0%	Republican hold
District 10	208,896	53.31%	182,938	46.69%	391,834	100.0%	Republican hold
District 11	241,915	63.12%	141,325	36.88%	383,240	100.0%	Republican hold
District 12	241,035	70.84%	99,199	29.16%	340,234	100.0%	Republican hold
District 13	267,789	73.49%	96,612	26.51%	364,401	100.0%	Republican hold
District 14	241,688	64.69%	131,895	35.31%	373,583	100.0%	Republican hold
District 15	255,058	73.46%	92,156	26.54%	347,214	100.0%	Republican hold
District 16	210,088	59.34%	143,962	40.66%	354,050	100.0%	Republican hold
District 17	212,284	48.85%	222,253	51.15%	434,537	100.0%	Democratic hold
District 18	118,163	30.75%	266,084	69.25%	384,247	100.0%	Democratic hold
Total	3,432,595	50.63%	3,346,712	49.37%	6,779,307	100.0%	

== District 1 ==
2020 Pennsylvania's 1st congressional district election
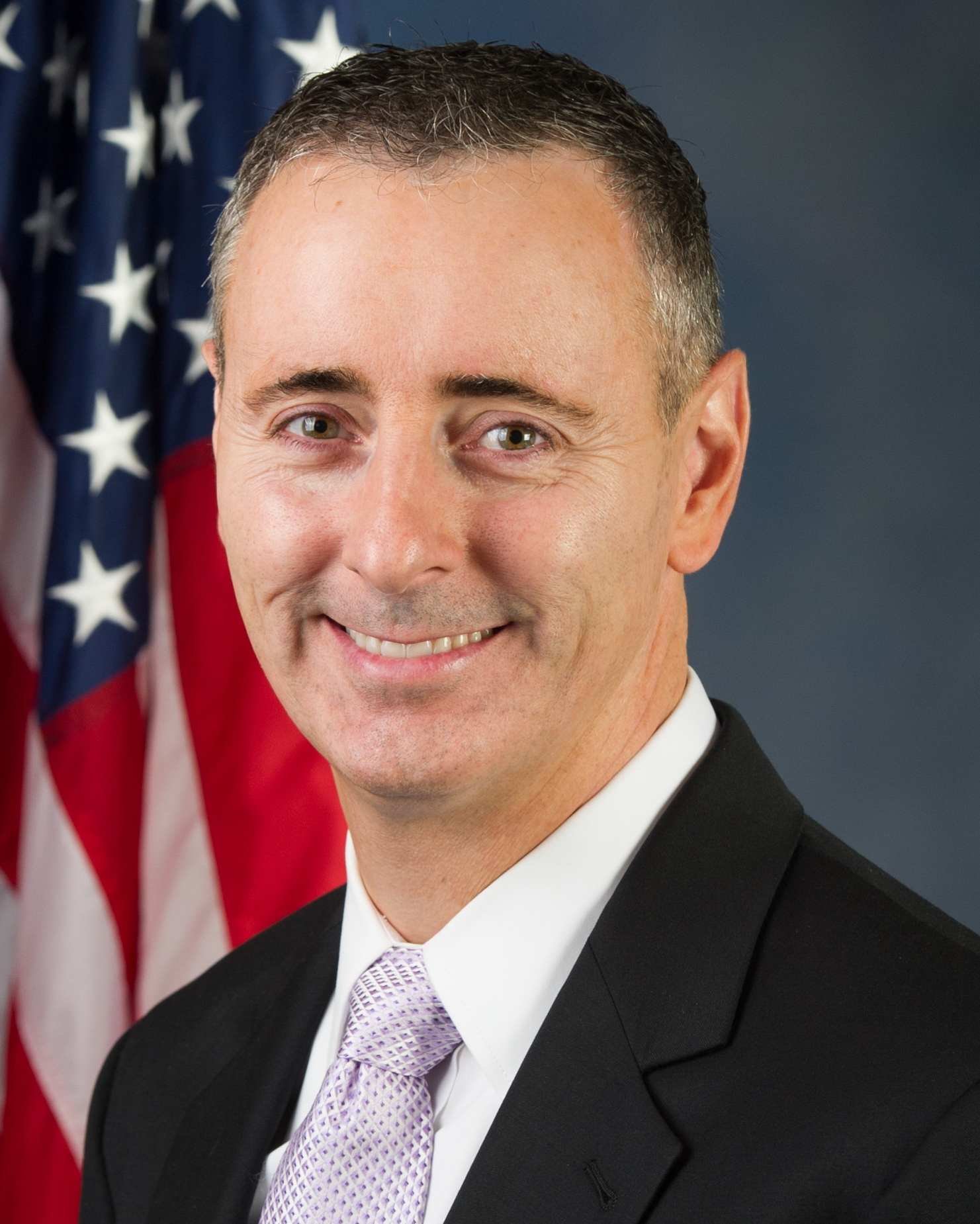

Nominee	Brian Fitzpatrick	Christina Finello
Party	Republican	Democratic
Popular vote	249,804	191,875
Percentage	56.6%	43.4%
- Precinct results Fitzpatrick: 50–60% 60–70% 70–80% Finello: 40–50% 50–60% 60–70%
U.S. representative before election
Brian Fitzpatrick
Republican
Elected U.S. representative
Brian Fitzpatrick
Republican

The 1st district consists of all of Bucks County and a sliver of Montgomery County. The incumbent was Republican Brian Fitzpatrick, who was re-elected with 51.3% of the vote in 2018

Brian Fitzpatrick

Organizations

- Humane Society
- Moms Demand Action
- Pennsylvania AFL–CIO
- Pro-Israel America
- Republican Jewish Coalition

Newspapers and other media

- The Philadelphia Inquirer

=== Primary results ===
Republican primary results
Party	Candidate	Votes	%
Republican	Brian Fitzpatrick (incumbent)	48,017	63.25
Republican	Andy Meehan	27,895	36.75
Total votes		75,912	100.00

=== Democratic primary ===
==== Candidates ====
===== Nominee =====
- Christina Finello, Ivyland borough councilwoman and Bucks County deputy director of Housing and Human Services

===== Eliminated in primary =====
- Skylar Hurwitz, owner of Demetrius Consulting, a technology consulting firm

===== Withdrew =====
- Judi Reiss, Bucks County prothonotary and former Lower Makefield Township supervisor
- Debra Wachspress, member of the Pennsbury School District school board

===== Declined =====
- Diane Ellis-Marseglia, Bucks County commissioner
- Patrick Murphy, former United States Under Secretary of the Army and former U.S. representative for Pennsylvania's 8th congressional district (2007–2011)
- Rachel Reddick, U.S. Navy veteran and candidate for Pennsylvania's 1st congressional district in 2018

==== Endorsements ====
Christina Finello

U.S. presidents

- Barack Obama, 44th president of the United States (2009–2017), U.S. senator from Illinois (2005–2008)
Skylar Hurwitz

Organizations

- LEAP Forward
- Sunrise Movement – Pennsbury chapter

==== Primary results ====
Democratic primary results
Party	Candidate	Votes	%
Democratic	Christina Finello	71,571	77.53
Democratic	Skylar Hurwitz	20,737	22.47
Total votes		92,308	100.00

=== Libertarian primary ===
==== Candidates ====
===== Nominee =====
- Steve Scheetz, chair of the Libertarian Party of Pennsylvania (write-in)

=== General election ===
==== Predictions ====
Source	Ranking	As of
The Cook Political Report	Lean R	July 2, 2020
Inside Elections	Lean R	June 2, 2020
Sabato's Crystal Ball	Lean R	July 2, 2020
Politico	Tossup	April 19, 2020
Daily Kos	Tossup	June 3, 2020
RCP	Tossup	June 9, 2020
Niskanen	Lean R	June 7, 2020
270toWin	Lean R	August 21, 2020

==== Polling ====
View source data.

with Debbie Waschspress

Poll source	Date(s) administered	Sample size	Margin of error	Brian Fitzpatrick (R)	Debbie Waschspress (D)	Undecided
Remington Research (R)	November 6–7, 2019	803 (LV)	± 3.4%	50%	36%	14%

with Generic Republican and Generic Democrat

Poll source	Date(s) administered	Sample size	Margin of error	Generic Republican	Generic Democrat	Other	Undecided
Public Policy Polling (D)	October 6–7, 2020	569 (LV)	–	44%	50%	–	6%
Public Policy Polling (D) (Note: Poll sponsored by Finello's campaign.)	June 10–11, 2020	753 (LV)	± 3.6%	40%	49%	–	11%
Victoria Research & Consulting (D)	June 7–14, 2020	403 (LV)	± 4.9%	40%	52%	2%	8%

==== Results ====
Pennsylvania's 1st congressional district election, 2020
Party	Candidate	Votes	%
Republican	Brian Fitzpatrick	249,804	56.56
Democratic	Christina Finello	191,875	43.44
Total votes		441,679	100.00
Republican hold			

== District 2 ==
2020 Pennsylvania's 2nd congressional district election
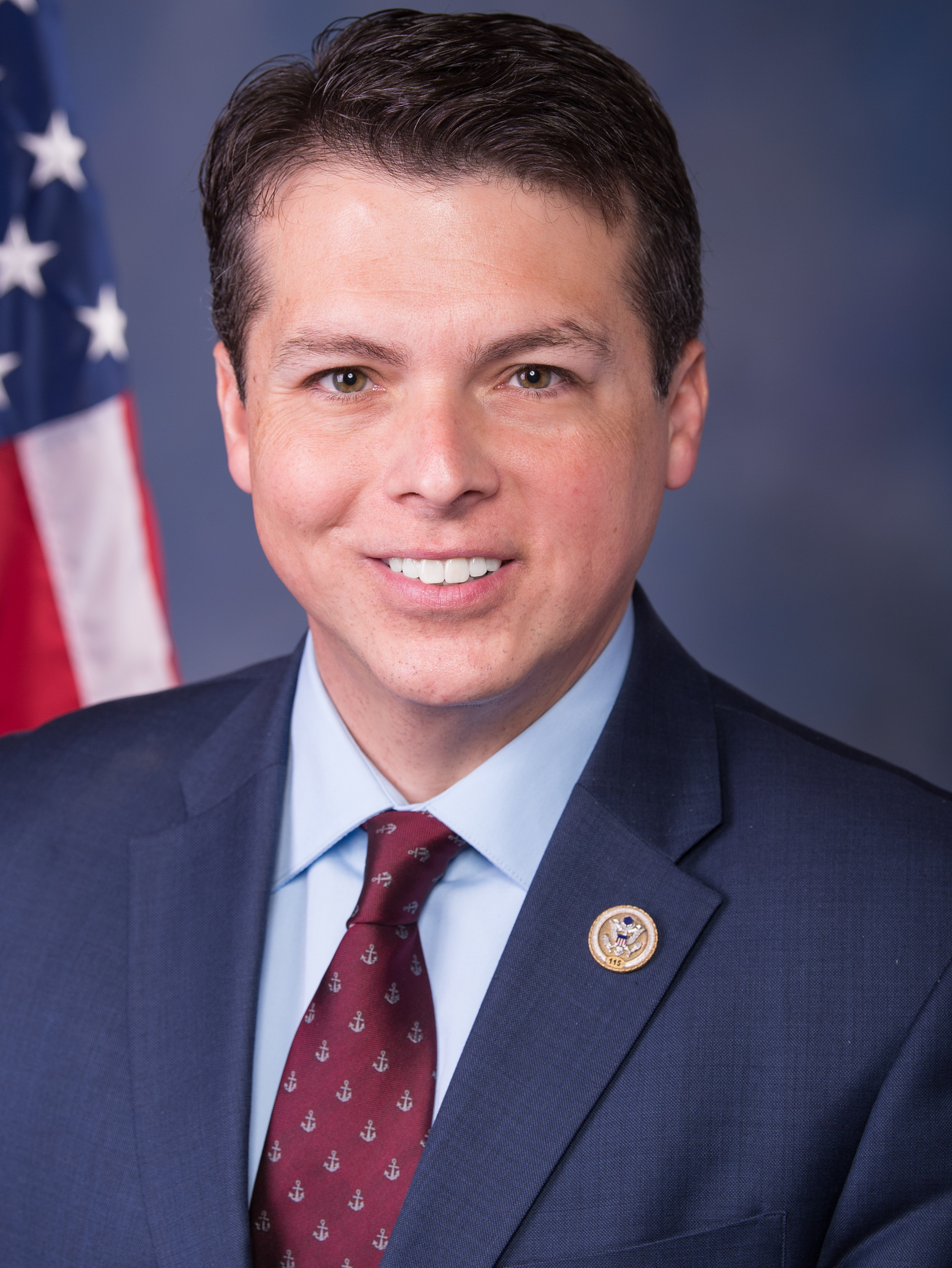

Nominee	Brendan Boyle	David Torres
Party	Democratic	Republican
Popular vote	198,140	75,022
Percentage	72.53%	27.47%
- Precinct results Boyle: 50–60% 60–70% 70–80% 80–90% >90% Torres: 50–60% 60–70% Tie: 50%
U.S. representative before election
Brendan Boyle
Democratic
Elected U.S. representative
Brendan Boyle
Democratic

The 2nd district consists of Northeast Philadelphia and parts of North Philadelphia. The incumbent was Democrat Brendan Boyle who was re-elected with 79.0% of the vote in 2018.

=== Democratic primary ===
==== Nominee ====
- Brendan Boyle, incumbent U.S. representative

==== Primary results ====
Democratic primary results
Party	Candidate	Votes	%
Democratic	Brendan Boyle (incumbent)	73,980	100.0
Total votes		73,980	100.0

=== Republican primary ===
==== Candidates ====
===== Nominee =====
- David Torres, community activist

==== Primary results ====
Republican primary results
Party	Candidate	Votes	%
Republican	David Torres	14,010	100.0
Total votes		14,010	100.0

=== General election ===
==== Predictions ====
Source	Ranking	As of
The Cook Political Report	Safe D	July 2, 2020
Inside Elections	Safe D	June 2, 2020
Sabato's Crystal Ball	Safe D	July 2, 2020
Politico	Safe D	April 19, 2020
Daily Kos	Safe D	June 3, 2020
RCP	Safe D	June 9, 2020
Niskanen	Safe D	June 7, 2020
270toWin	Safe D	August 21, 2020

==== Results ====
Pennsylvania's 2nd congressional district election, 2020
Party	Candidate	Votes	%
Democratic	Brendan Boyle (incumbent)	198,140	72.5
Republican	David Torres	75,022	27.5
Total votes		273,162	100.0
Democratic hold			

== District 3 ==
2020 Pennsylvania's 3rd congressional district election
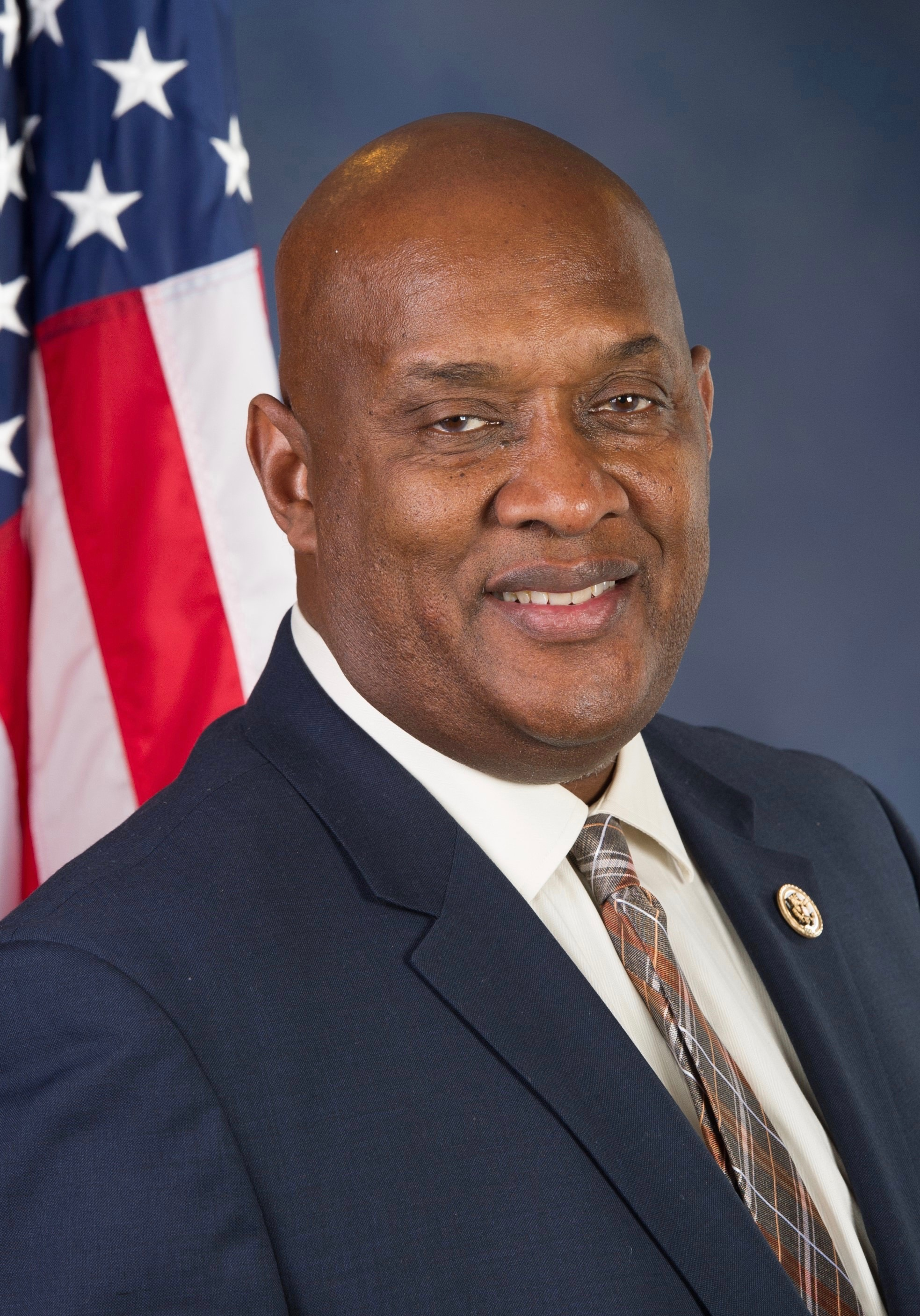

Nominee	Dwight Evans	Michael Harvey
Party	Democratic	Republican
Popular vote	341,708	33,671
Percentage	91.0%	9.0%
- Precinct results Evans: 50–60% 60–70% 70–80% 80–90% >90% Harvey: 50–60%
U.S. representative before election
Dwight Evans
Democratic
Elected U.S. representative
Dwight Evans
Democratic

The 3rd district is anchored by Philadelphia, taking in the northwest, west, and Center City sections of the city. The incumbent was Democrat Dwight Evans, who was re-elected with 93.4% of the vote in 2018.

=== Democratic primary ===
==== Candidates ====
===== Nominee =====
- Dwight Evans, incumbent U.S. representative

==== Endorsements ====
Dwight Evans

Organizations

- Humane Society
- J Street PAC
- Sierra Club

==== Primary results ====
Democratic primary results
Party	Candidate	Votes	%
Democratic	Dwight Evans (incumbent)	164,871	100.0
Total votes		164,871	100.0

=== Republican primary ===
==== Candidates ====
===== Nominee =====
- Michael Harvey, Philadelphia's 60th Ward Chairperson and military veteran

==== Primary results ====
Republican primary results
Party	Candidate	Votes	%
Republican	Michael Harvey	5,020	100.0
Total votes		5,020	100.0

=== General election ===
==== Predictions ====
Source	Ranking	As of
The Cook Political Report	Safe D	July 2, 2020
Inside Elections	Safe D	June 2, 2020
Sabato's Crystal Ball	Safe D	July 2, 2020
Politico	Safe D	April 19, 2020
Daily Kos	Safe D	June 3, 2020
RCP	Safe D	June 9, 2020
Niskanen	Safe D	June 7, 2020
270toWin	Safe D	August 21, 2020

==== Results ====
Pennsylvania's 3rd congressional district election, 2020
Party	Candidate	Votes	%
Democratic	Dwight Evans (incumbent)	341,708	91.0
Republican	Michael Harvey	33,671	9.0
Total votes		375,379	100.0
Democratic hold			

== District 4 ==
2020 Pennsylvania's 4th congressional district election
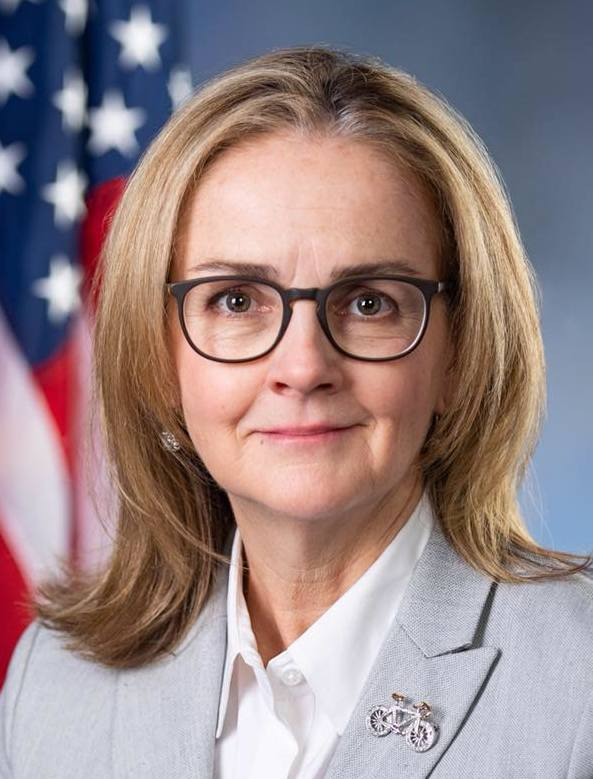

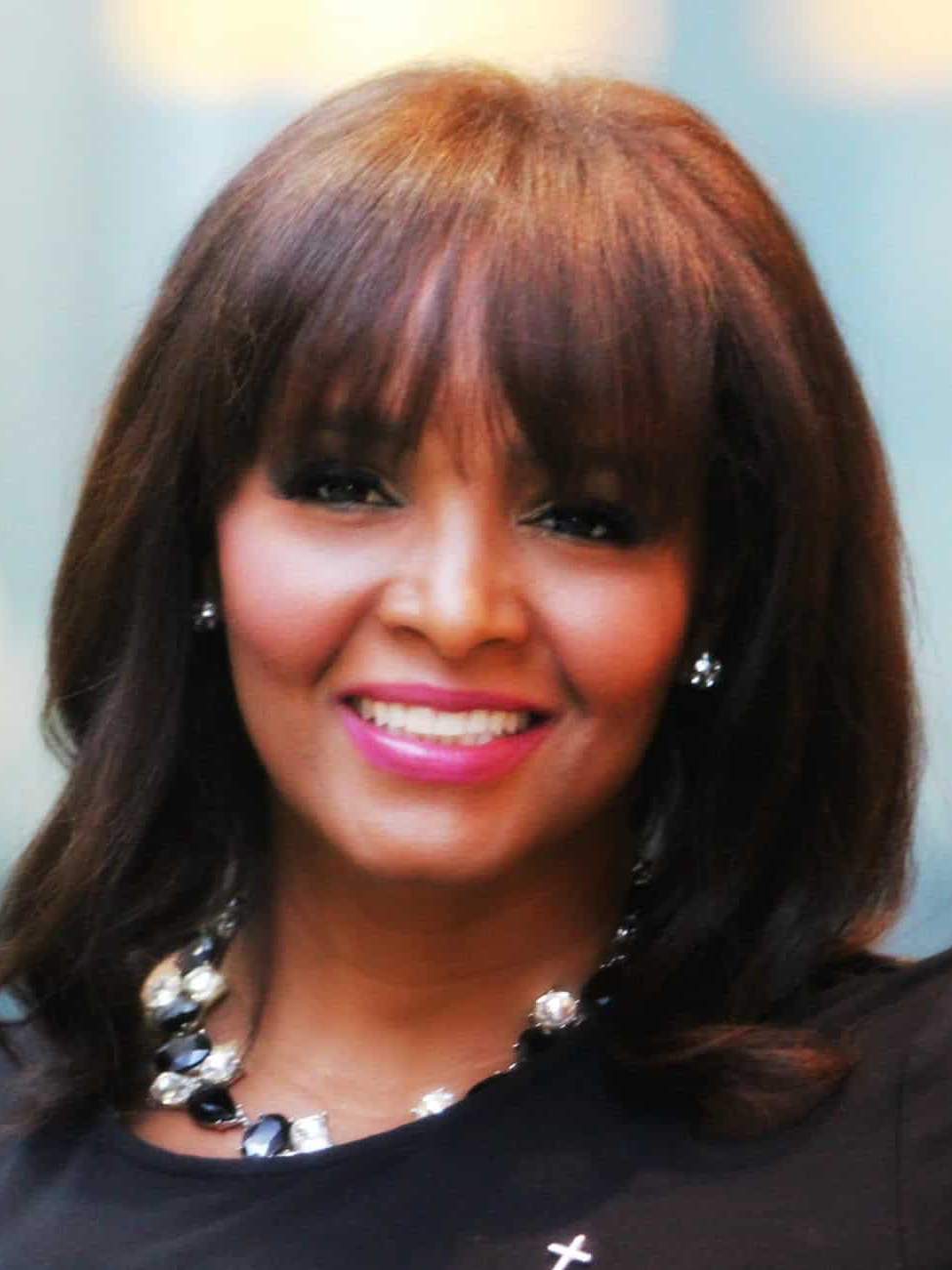
Nominee	Madeleine Dean	Kathy Barnette
Party	Democratic	Republican
Popular vote	264,637	179,926
Percentage	59.5%	40.5%
- Precinct results Dean: 50–60% 60–70% 70–80% 80–90% >90% Barnette: 50–60% 60–70% 70–80%
U.S. representative before election
Madeleine Dean
Democratic
Elected U.S. representative
Madeleine Dean
Democratic

The 4th district takes in the northern suburbs of Philadelphia, centering on Montgomery County. The incumbent was Democrat Madeleine Dean, who was elected with 63.5% of the vote in 2018.

=== Democratic primary ===
==== Candidates ====
===== Nominee =====
- Madeleine Dean, incumbent U.S. representative

==== Endorsements ====
Madeleine Dean

Organizations

- Brady Campaign
- Equality PAC
- Humane Society
- Jewish Democratic Council of America
- League of Conservation Voters Action Fund
- NARAL Pro-Choice America
- National Organization for Women
- Sierra Club

==== Primary results ====
Democratic primary results
Party	Candidate	Votes	%
Democratic	Madeleine Dean (incumbent)	122,657	100.0
Total votes		122,657	100.0

=== Republican primary ===
==== Candidates ====
===== Nominee =====
- Kathy Barnette, military veteran and political commentator

===== Withdrawn =====
- Renee Beadencup, paralegal

==== Endorsements ====
Kathy Barnette
- Eric Trump, businessman, former reality television personality and son of Donald Trump

==== Primary results ====
Republican primary results
Party	Candidate	Votes	%
Republican	Kathy Barnette	58,571	100.0
Total votes		58,571	100.0

=== Independent candidates ===
- Joe Tarshish, auditor (write-in)

=== General election ===
==== Predictions ====
Source	Ranking	As of
The Cook Political Report	Safe D	July 2, 2020
Inside Elections	Safe D	June 2, 2020
Sabato's Crystal Ball	Safe D	July 2, 2020
Politico	Safe D	April 19, 2020
Daily Kos	Safe D	June 3, 2020
RCP	Safe D	June 9, 2020
Niskanen	Safe D	June 7, 2020
270toWin	Safe D	August 21, 2020

==== Results ====
Pennsylvania's 4th congressional district election, 2020
Party	Candidate	Votes	%
Democratic	Madeleine Dean (incumbent)	264,637	59.5
Republican	Kathy Barnette	179,926	40.5
Total votes		444,563	100.0
Democratic hold			

== District 5 ==
2020 Pennsylvania's 5th congressional district election
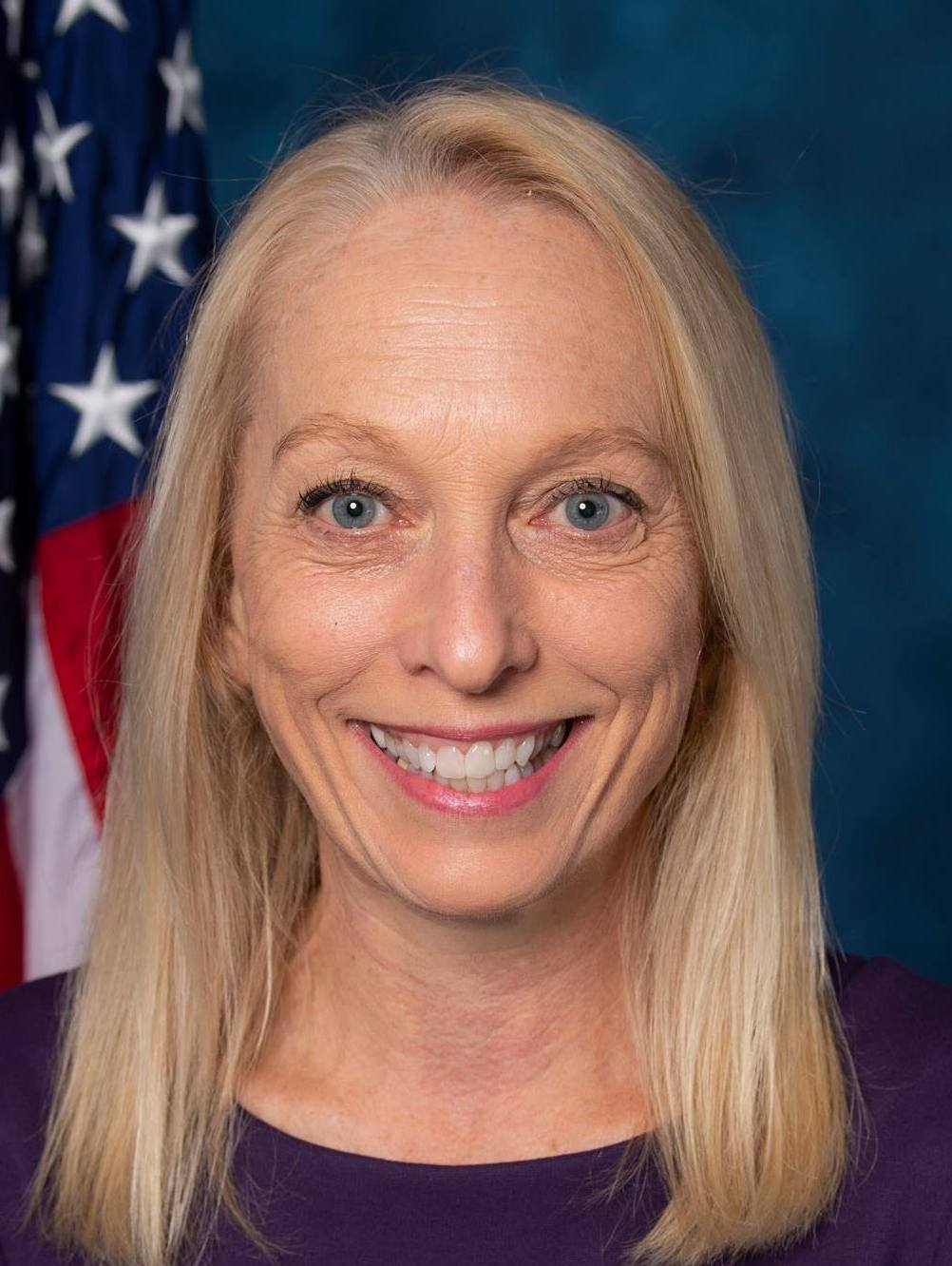

Nominee	Mary Gay Scanlon	Dasha Pruett
Party	Democratic	Republican
Popular vote	255,743	139,552
Percentage	64.7%	35.3%
- Precinct results Scanlon: 50–60% 60–70% 70–80% 80–90% >90% Pruett: 50–60% 60–70% Tie: 40–50% 50% No data
U.S. representative before election
Mary Gay Scanlon
Democratic
Elected U.S. representative
Mary Gay Scanlon
Democratic

The 5th district consists of Delaware County, portions of South Philadelphia, and a sliver of Montgomery County. The incumbent was Democrat Mary Gay Scanlon, who flipped the district with 65.2% of the vote in 2018.

=== Democratic primary ===
==== Candidates ====
===== Nominee =====
- Mary Gay Scanlon, incumbent U.S. representative

==== Endorsements ====
Mary Gay Scanlon

Organizations

- Brady Campaign
- Equality PAC
- Humane Society
- J Street PAC
- Jewish Democratic Council of America
- League of Conservation Voters Action Fund
- Moms Demand Action
- National Organization for Women
- Sierra Club

Labor unions

- Pennsylvania AFL–CIO

==== Primary results ====
Democratic primary results
Party	Candidate	Votes	%
Democratic	Mary Gay Scanlon (incumbent)	103,194	100.0
Total votes		103,194	100.0

=== Republican primary ===
==== Candidates ====
===== Nominee =====
- Dasha Pruett, photographer

===== Eliminated in primary =====
- Rob Jordan, activist

==== Primary results ====
Republican primary results
Party	Candidate	Votes	%
Republican	Dasha Pruett	31,734	61.5
Republican	Rob Jordan	19,890	38.5
Total votes		51,624	100.0

=== General election ===
==== Predictions ====
Source	Ranking	As of
The Cook Political Report	Safe D	July 2, 2020
Inside Elections	Safe D	June 2, 2020
Sabato's Crystal Ball	Safe D	July 2, 2020
Politico	Safe D	April 19, 2020
Daily Kos	Safe D	June 3, 2020
RCP	Safe D	June 9, 2020
Niskanen	Safe D	June 7, 2020
270toWin	Safe D	August 21, 2020

==== Results ====
Pennsylvania's 5th congressional district election, 2020
Party	Candidate	Votes	%
Democratic	Mary Gay Scanlon (incumbent)	255,743	64.7
Republican	Dasha Pruett	139,552	35.3
Total votes		395,295	100.0
Democratic hold			

== District 6 ==
2020 Pennsylvania's 6th congressional district election
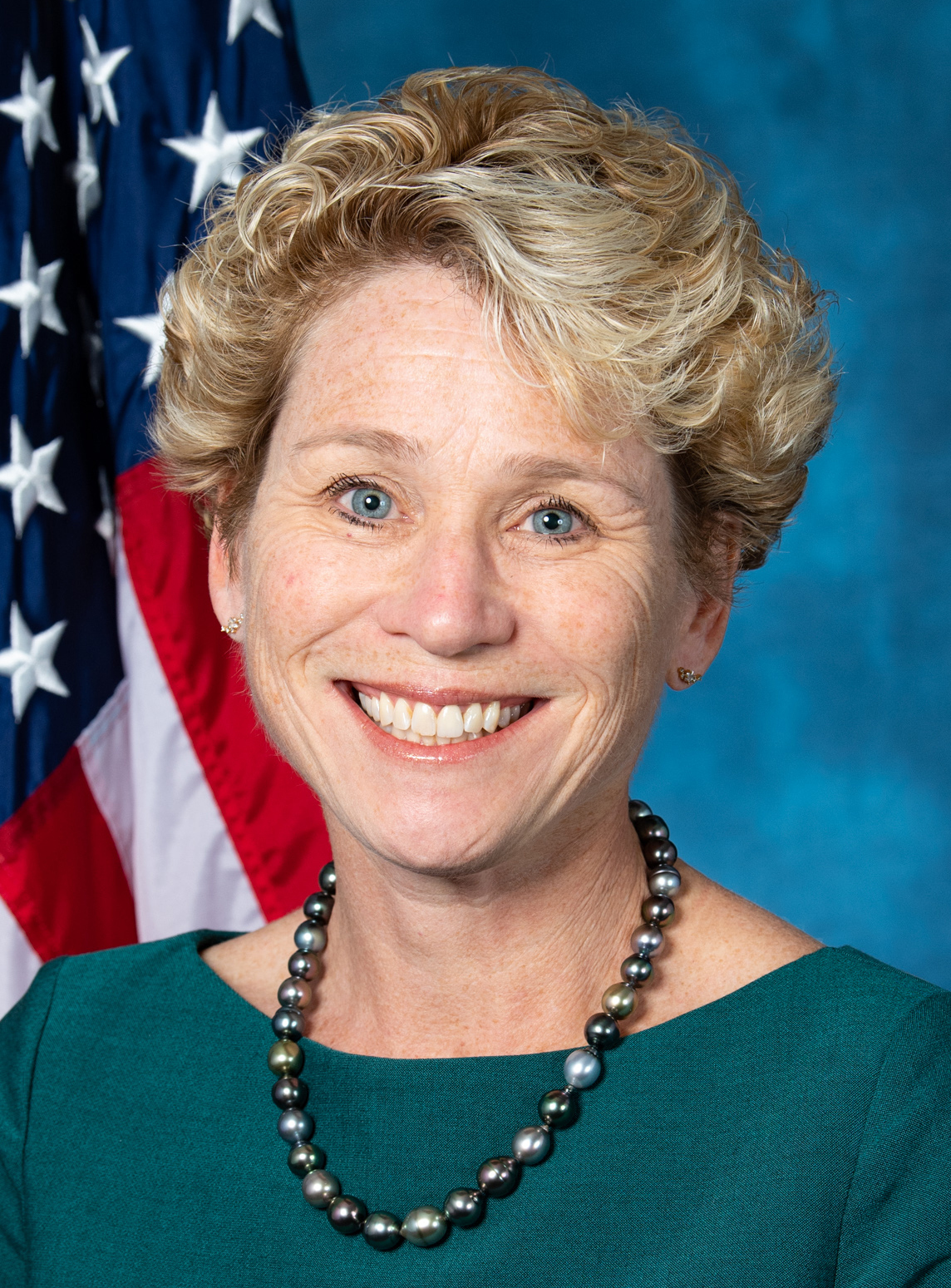

Nominee	Chrissy Houlahan	John Emmons
Party	Democratic	Republican
Popular vote	226,440	177,526
Percentage	56.1%	43.9%
- Precinct results Houlahan: 50–60% 60–70% 70–80% 80–90% >90% Emmons: 50–60% 60–70% 70–80% >90%
U.S. representative before election
Chrissy Houlahan
Democratic
Elected U.S. representative
Chrissy Houlahan
Democratic

The 6th district encompasses all of Chester County and the part of southern Berks County including Reading. The incumbent was Democrat Chrissy Houlahan, who flipped the district and was elected with 58.9% of the vote in 2018.

=== Democratic primary ===
==== Candidates ====
===== Nominee =====
- Chrissy Houlahan, incumbent U.S. representative

==== Endorsements ====
Chrissy Houlahan

Organizations

- 314 Action
- Brady Campaign
- Democratic Majority for Israel
- End Citizens United
- Equality PAC
- Giffords
- Humane Society
- Jewish Democratic Council of America
- League of Conservation Voters Action Fund
- Moms Demand Action
- NARAL Pro-Choice America
- National Organization for Women
- Sierra Club

==== Primary results ====
Democratic primary results
Party	Candidate	Votes	%
Democratic	Chrissy Houlahan (incumbent)	89,411	100.0
Total votes		89,411	100.0

=== Republican primary ===
==== Candidates ====
===== Nominee =====
- John Emmons, chemical engineer

===== Declined =====
- Ryan Costello, former U.S. representative

==== Primary results ====
Republican primary results
Party	Candidate	Votes	%
Republican	John Emmons	56,928	100.0
Total votes		56,928	100.0

=== Candidates ===
==== Declared ====
- John McHugh, Honey Brook Township chairman and Marine veteran (write-in)

=== General election ===
==== Predictions ====
Source	Ranking	As of
The Cook Political Report	Safe D	July 2, 2020
Inside Elections	Safe D	June 2, 2020
Sabato's Crystal Ball	Safe D	July 2, 2020
Politico	Safe D	April 19, 2020
Daily Kos	Safe D	June 3, 2020
RCP	Safe D	June 9, 2020
Niskanen	Safe D	June 7, 2020
270toWin	Safe D	August 21, 2020

==== Results ====
Pennsylvania's 6th congressional district election, 2020
Party	Candidate	Votes	%
Democratic	Chrissy Houlahan (incumbent)	226,440	56.1
Republican	John Emmons	177,526	43.9
Total votes		403,966	100.0
Democratic hold			

== District 7 ==
2020 Pennsylvania's 7th congressional district election
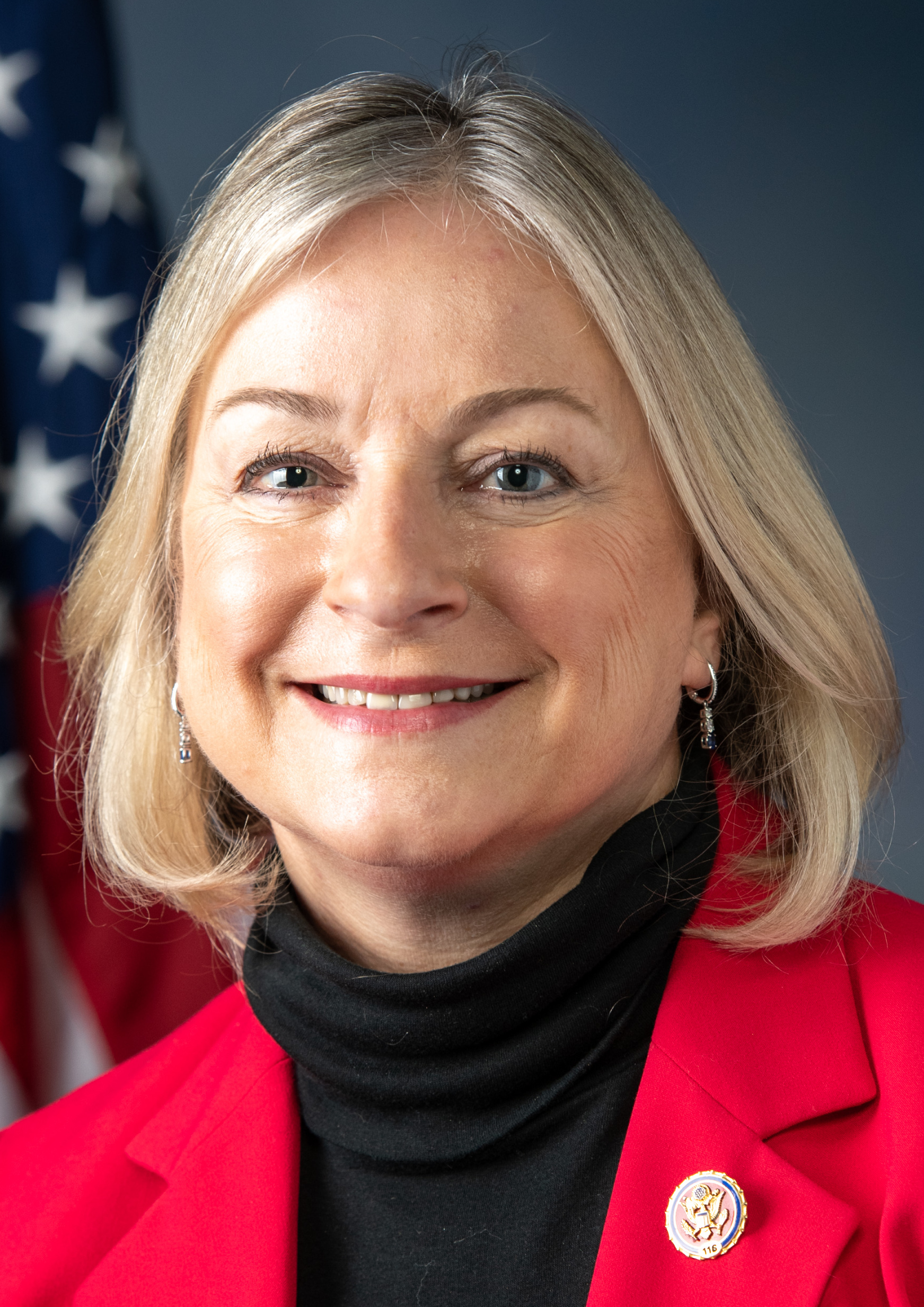

Nominee	Susan Wild	Lisa Scheller
Party	Democratic	Republican
Popular vote	195,475	181,407
Percentage	51.9%	48.1%
- Wild: 50–60% 60–70% 70–80% 80–90% Scheller: 50–60% 60–70% 70–80%
U.S. representative before election
Susan Wild
Democratic
Elected U.S. representative
Susan Wild
Democratic

The 7th district is based in the Lehigh Valley, and consists of Lehigh and Northampton counties as well as parts of Monroe County, including the cities of Allentown, Bethlehem, and Easton. The incumbent was Democrat Susan Wild, who flipped the district and was elected with 53.5% of the vote in 2018.

=== Democratic primary ===
==== Nominee ====
- Susan Wild, incumbent U.S. representative

==== Endorsements ====
Susan Wild

U.S. presidents

- Barack Obama, 44th president of the United States (2009–2017)

Individuals

- Abbi Jacobson, comedian
- Amanda Seyfried, actress

Organizations

- BOLD PAC
- Brady Campaign
- Democratic Majority for Israel
- EMILY's List
- End Citizens United
- Equality PAC
- Giffords
- Humane Society
- Jewish Democratic Council of America
- League of Conservation Voters Action Fund
- Moms Demand Action
- NARAL Pro-Choice America
- National Organization for Women
- Planned Parenthood Action Fund
- Sierra Club

==== Primary results ====
Democratic primary results
Party	Candidate	Votes	%
Democratic	Susan Wild (incumbent)	76,878	100.0
Total votes		76,878	100.0

=== Republican primary ===
==== Candidates ====
===== Nominee =====
- Lisa Scheller, former Lehigh County commissioner

===== Eliminated in primary =====
- Dean Browning, former Lehigh County commissioner, businessman, and candidate for Pennsylvania's 7th congressional district in 2018

===== Did not qualify for ballot access =====
- Matthew D. Connolly, Republican nominee for PA-17 in 2018

==== Endorsements ====
Lisa Scheller

Organizations

- Maggie's List

==== Primary results ====
Republican primary results
Party	Candidate	Votes	%
Republican	Lisa Scheller	29,673	52.1
Republican	Dean Browning	27,260	47.9
Total votes		56,933	100.0

=== General election ===
==== Predictions ====
Source	Ranking	As of
The Cook Political Report	Likely D	October 8, 2020
Inside Elections	Safe D	June 2, 2020
Sabato's Crystal Ball	Likely D	October 8, 2020
Politico	Lean D	April 19, 2020
Daily Kos	Safe D	October 29, 2020
RCP	Likely D	June 9, 2020
Niskanen	Safe D	June 7, 2020
270toWin	Likely D	August 21, 2020

==== Polling ====
Poll source	Date(s) administered	Sample size (Note: Key: A – all adults RV – registered voters LV – likely voters V – unclear)	Margin of error	Susan Wild (D)	Lisa Scheller (R)	Other	Undecided
DeSales University	October 11–24, 2020 (Note: Additional data sourced from FiveThirtyEight)	448 (LV)	± 4.4%	54%	36%	–	–
Franklin & Marshall College	October 12–18, 2020	447 (V)	± 5.8%	44%	36%	–	20%
DeSales University	October 3–10, 2020	466 (LV)	± 4.3%	54%	36%	–	–
Muhlenberg College/Morning Call	September 21–24, 2020	414 (LV)	± 5.5%	52%	39%	2% (Note: "Other/neither" with 2%)	8%

==== Results ====
Pennsylvania's 7th congressional district election, 2020
Party	Candidate	Votes	%
Democratic	Susan Wild (incumbent)	195,475	51.9
Republican	Lisa Scheller	181,407	48.1
Total votes		376,882	100.0
Democratic hold			

== District 8 ==
2020 Pennsylvania's 8th congressional district election
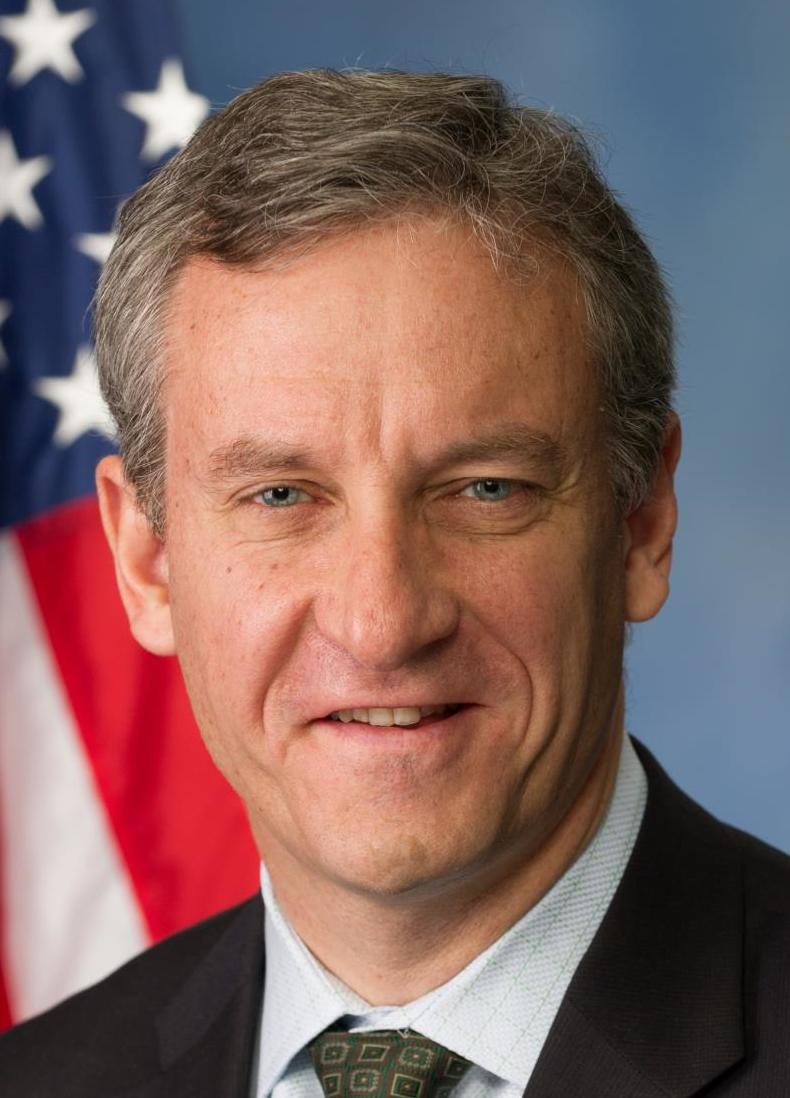

Nominee	Matt Cartwright	Jim Bognet
Party	Democratic	Republican
Popular vote	178,004	165,783
Percentage	51.8%	48.2%
- Cartwright: 50–60% 60–70% 70–80% Bognet: 50–60% 60–70% 70–80%
U.S. representative before election
Matt Cartwright
Democratic
Elected U.S. representative
Matt Cartwright
Democratic

The 8th district, based in the northeastern part of the state, is home to the cities of Scranton and Wilkes-Barre. The incumbent was Democrat Matt Cartwright, who was re-elected with 54.6% of the vote in 2018.

=== Democratic primary ===
==== Candidates ====
===== Nominee =====
- Matt Cartwright, incumbent U.S. representative

==== Endorsements ====
Matt Cartwright

U.S. presidents

- Barack Obama, 44th president of the United States

U.S. senators

- Elizabeth Warren, U.S. senator (D-MA); former 2020 presidential candidate

Organizations

- Blue America
- BOLD PAC
- Democratic Majority for Israel
- End Citizens United
- Giffords
- Humane Society
- J Street PAC
- Jewish Democratic Council of America
- League of Conservation Voters Action Fund
- Moms Demand Action
- Our Revolution
- Progressive Democrats of America
- Sierra Club

==== Primary results ====
Democratic primary results
Party	Candidate	Votes	%
Democratic	Matt Cartwright (incumbent)	75,101	100.0
Total votes		75,101	100.0

=== Republican primary ===
==== Candidates ====
===== Nominee =====
- Jim Bognet, former senior vice president for communications of the Export–Import Bank of the United States

===== Eliminated in primary =====
- Mike Cammisa, bar manager
- Teddy Daniels, former police officer and U.S. Army veteran
- Earl Granville, U.S. Army veteran
- Harry Haas, Luzerne County councilman
- Michael Marsicano, former mayor of Hazleton

===== Declined =====
- Lou Barletta, former U.S. representative and nominee for U.S. Senate in 2018

==== Primary results ====
Republican primary results
Party	Candidate	Votes	%
Republican	Jim Bognet	16,281	28.4
Republican	Teddy Daniels	13,560	23.7
Republican	Earl Granville	13,283	23.2
Republican	Mike Marsciano	7,404	12.9
Republican	Harry Haas	5,369	9.4
Republican	Mike Cammisa	1,367	2.4
Total votes		57,264	100.0

=== General election ===
==== Predictions ====
Source	Ranking	As of
The Cook Political Report	Lean D	July 17, 2020
Inside Elections	Safe D	October 16, 2020
Sabato's Crystal Ball	Likely D	October 8, 2020
Politico	Lean D	April 19, 2020
Daily Kos	Likely D	October 26, 2020
RCP	Tossup	June 9, 2020
Niskanen	Safe D	June 7, 2020
270toWin	Lean D	August 21, 2020

==== Polling ====
Poll source	Date(s) administered	Sample size	Margin of error	Matt Cartwright (D)	Jim Bognet (R)	Undecided
efficient (R) (Note: Poll sponsored by Bognet's campaign)	October 13–14, 2020	615 (LV)	–	48%	43%	9%

==== Results ====
Pennsylvania's 8th congressional district election, 2020
Party	Candidate	Votes	%
Democratic	Matt Cartwright (incumbent)	178,004	51.8
Republican	Jim Bognet	165,783	48.2
Total votes		343,787	100.0
Democratic hold			

== District 9 ==
2020 Pennsylvania's 9th congressional district election
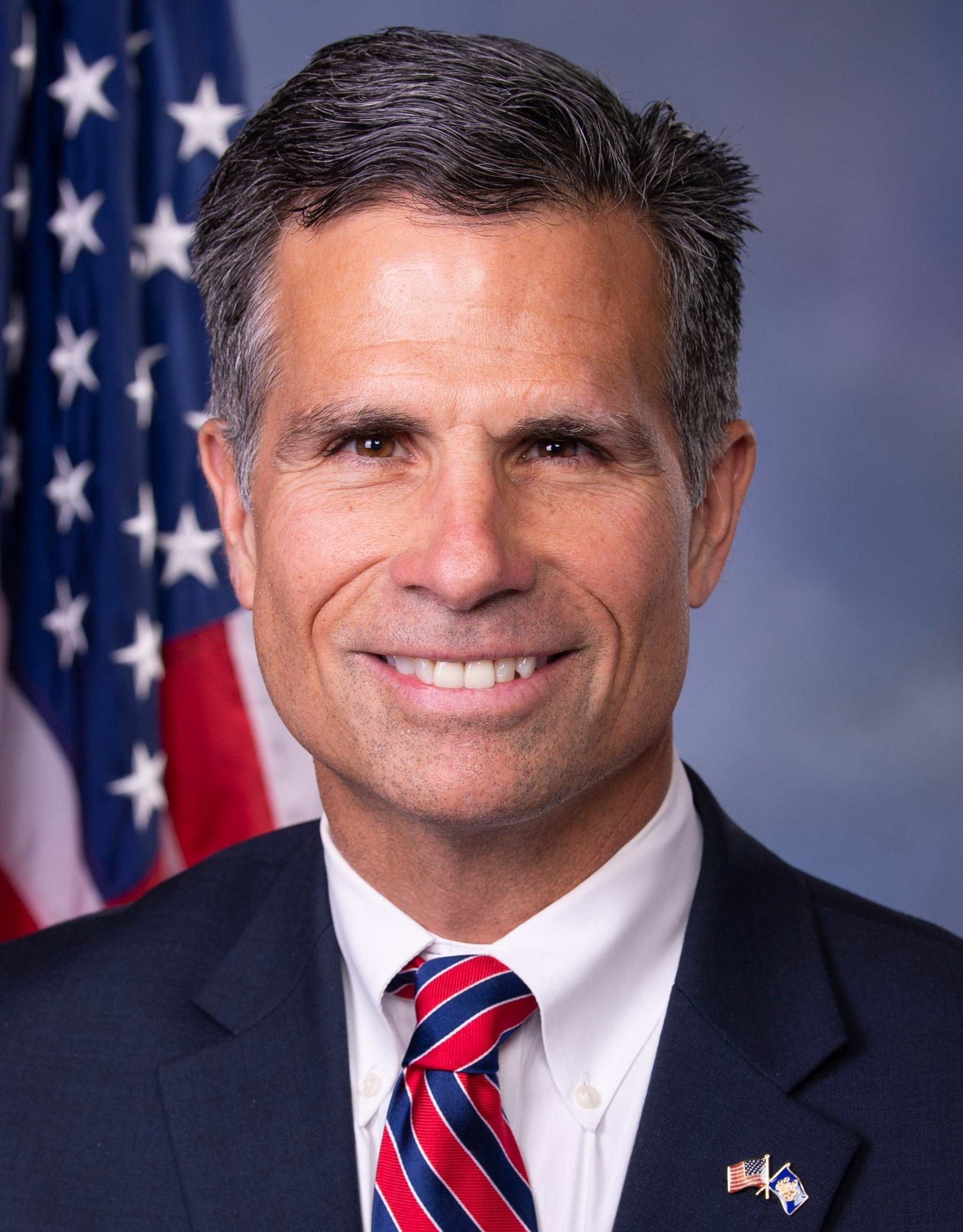

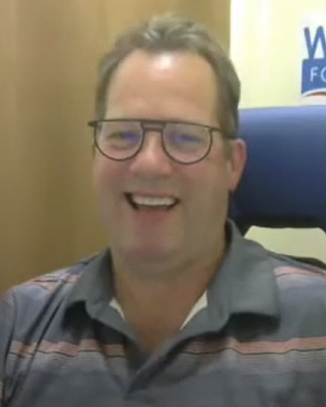
Nominee	Dan Meuser	Gary Wegman
Party	Republican	Democratic
Popular vote	232,988	118,266
Percentage	66.3%	33.7%
- Precinct results Meuser: 40–50% 50–60% 60–70% 70–80% 80–90% >90% Wegman: 50–60% 60–70% No data
U.S. representative before election
Dan Meuser
Republican
Elected U.S. representative
Dan Meuser
Republican

The 9th district encompasses the Coal Region of Northeastern Pennsylvania. The incumbent was Republican Dan Meuser, who was elected with 59.7% of the vote in 2018.

=== Republican primary ===
==== Candidates ====
===== Nominee =====
- Dan Meuser, incumbent U.S. representative

==== Endorsements ====
Dan Meuser

U.S. presidents

- Donald Trump, 45th president of the United States

==== Primary results ====
Republican primary results
Party	Candidate	Votes	%
Republican	Dan Meuser (incumbent)	77,350	100.0
Total votes		77,350	100.0

=== Democratic primary ===
==== Nominee ====
- Gary Wegman, dentist

==== Eliminated in primary ====
- Laura Quick, delivery driver

==== Primary results ====
Democratic primary results
Party	Candidate	Votes	%
Democratic	Gary Wegman	27,451	51.0
Democratic	Laura Quick	26,385	49.0
Total votes		53,836	100.0

=== General election ===
==== Predictions ====
Source	Ranking	As of
The Cook Political Report	Safe R	July 2, 2020
Inside Elections	Safe R	June 2, 2020
Sabato's Crystal Ball	Safe R	July 2, 2020
Politico	Safe R	April 19, 2020
Daily Kos	Safe R	June 3, 2020
RCP	Safe R	June 9, 2020
Niskanen	Safe R	June 7, 2020
270toWin	Safe R	August 21, 2020

==== Results ====
Pennsylvania's 9th congressional district election, 2020
Party	Candidate	Votes	%
Republican	Dan Meuser (incumbent)	232,988	66.3
Democratic	Gary Wegman	118,266	33.7
Total votes		351,254	100.0
Republican hold			

== District 10 ==
2020 Pennsylvania's 10th congressional district election
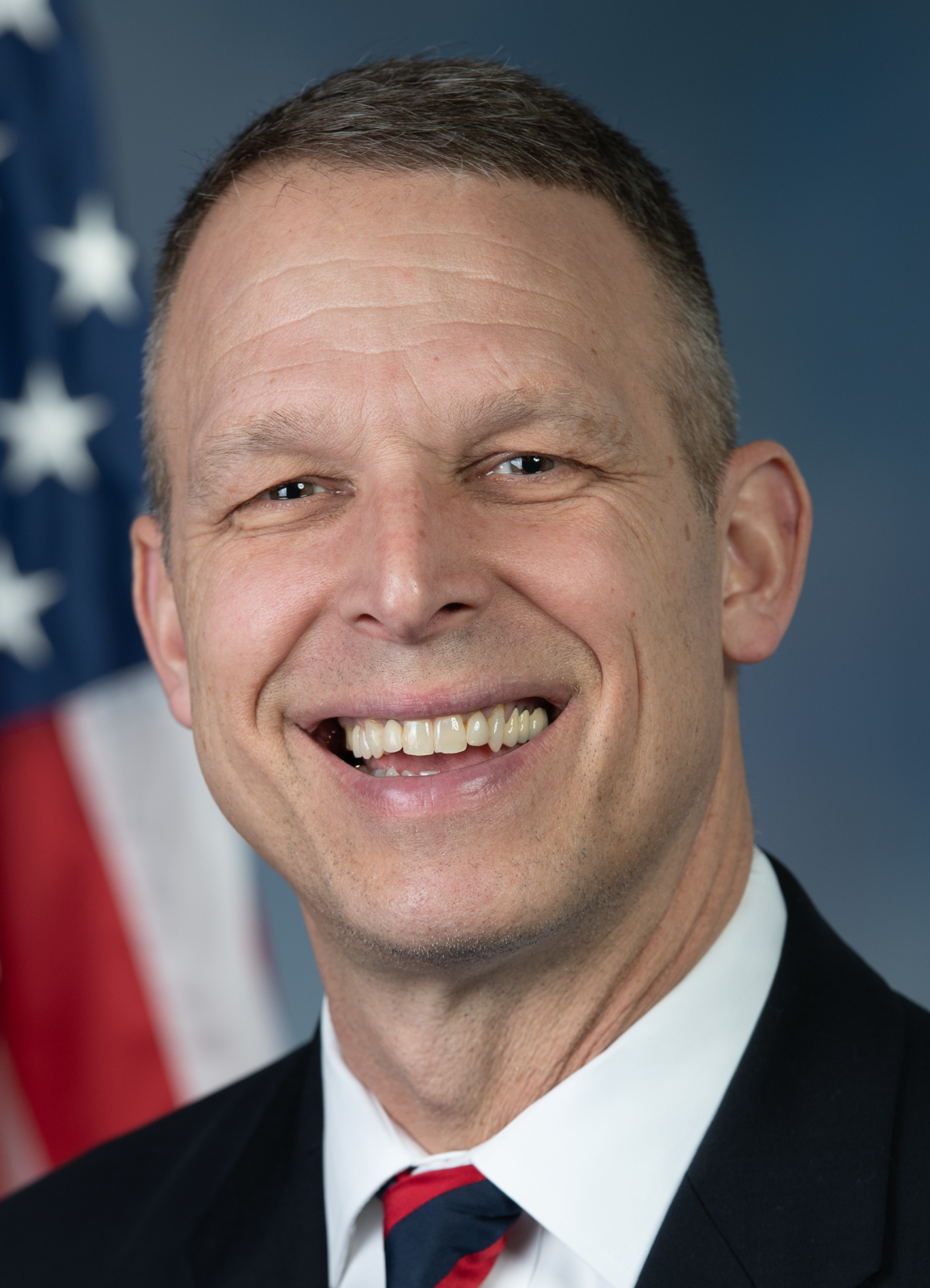

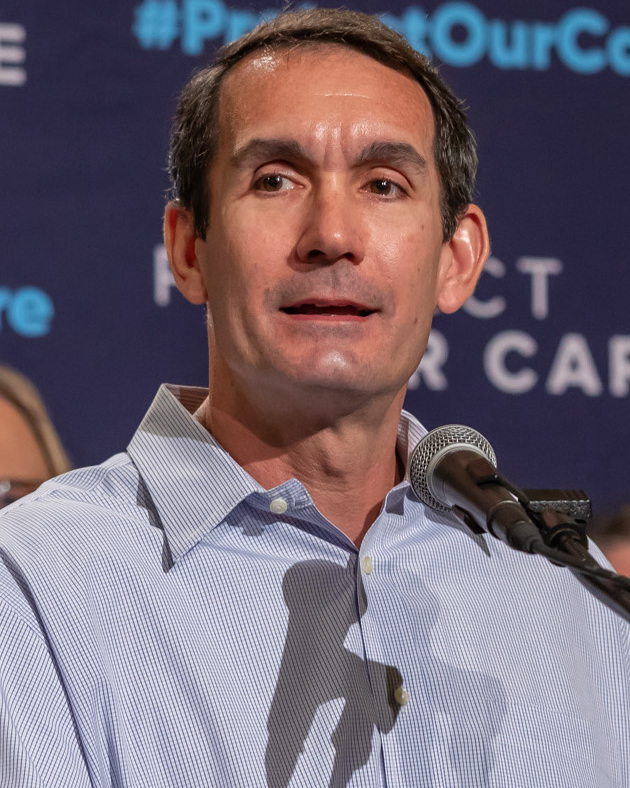
Nominee	Scott Perry	Eugene DePasquale
Party	Republican	Democratic
Popular vote	208,896	182,938
Percentage	53.3%	46.7%
- Precinct results Perry: 50–60% 60–70% 70–80% 80–90% DePasquale: 50–60% 60–70% 70–80% 80–90% >90%
U.S. representative before election
Scott Perry
Republican
Elected U.S. representative
Scott Perry
Republican

The 10th district covers all of Dauphin County and parts of Cumberland and York counties, including the cities of Harrisburg and York. The incumbent was Republican Scott Perry, who was re-elected with 51.3% of the vote in 2018. Perry won re-election to his house seat in 2020, defeating pennsylvania state Auditor General Eugene DePasquale by 25,958 votes. DePasquale subsequently conceded the race.

=== Republican primary ===
==== Candidates ====
===== Nominee =====
- Scott Perry, incumbent U.S. representative

===== Withdrew =====
- Bobby Jeffries, logistics director

==== Endorsements ====
Scott Perry

U.S. presidents

- Donald Trump, 45th president of the United States

Organizations

- Club for Growth

==== Primary results ====
Republican primary results
Party	Candidate	Votes	%
Republican	Scott Perry (incumbent)	79,365	100.0
Total votes		79,365	100.0

=== Democratic primary ===
==== Candidates ====
===== Nominee =====
- Eugene DePasquale, Pennsylvania auditor general

===== Eliminated in primary =====
- Tom Brier, attorney

===== Withdrew =====
- Jobo Dean, businessman

===== Declined =====
- George Scott, U.S. Army veteran, pastor, and nominee for Pennsylvania's 10th congressional district in 2018 (running for PA Senate, District 15)

==== Endorsements ====
Tom Brier

State executives

- Kathleen Kennedy Townsend, lieutenant governor of Maryland (1995–2003)

Organizations

- LEAP Forward
Eugene DePasquale

U.S. presidents

- Barack Obama, 44th president of the United States (2009–2017), U.S. senator from Illinois (2005–2008)

U.S. vice presidents

- Joe Biden, 47th vice president of the United States (2009–2017), United States senator from Delaware (1973–2009), Democratic nominee for the 2020 election

U.S. senators

- Kamala Harris, U.S. senator from California (2017-present), Democratic Party's nominee for vice president in the 2020 election, attorney general of California (2011–2017) and attorney general of San Francisco (2004–2011)

U.S. representatives

- Nancy Pelosi, U.S. representative from CA-12 (2013–present), CA-08 (1993–2013), and CA-05 (1987–1993), speaker of the U.S. House of Representatives (2019–present, 2007–2011)

Organizations

- Democratic Majority for Israel
- Everytown for Gun Safety
- Human Rights Campaign
- J Street PAC

Newspapers and other media

- The York Dispatch

==== Polling ====
Poll source	Date(s) administered	Sample size	Margin of error	Tom Brier	Eugene De Pasquale
GBAO Strategies (Note: Poll sponsored by De Pasquale's campaign)	February 5–9, 2020	– (V) (Note: Not yet released)	–	16%	68%

==== Primary results ====
Democratic primary results
Party	Candidate	Votes	%
Democratic	Eugene DePasquale	45,453	57.4
Democratic	Tom Brier	33,661	42.6
Total votes		79,114	100.0

=== General election ===
==== Debate ====
2020 Pennsylvania's 10th congressional district debate
No.	Date	Host	Moderator	Link	Republican	Democratic
Key: P Participant A Absent N Not invited I Invited W Withdrawn						
Key: P Participant A Absent N Not invited I Invited W Withdrawn					Scott Perry	Eugene DePasquale
1	Oct. 19, 2020	WGAL	Janelle Stelson	YouTube (Part 1); YouTube (Part 2); YouTube (Part 3)	P	P

==== Predictions ====
Source	Ranking	As of
The Cook Political Report	Tossup	July 2, 2020
Inside Elections	Tossup	October 16, 2020
Sabato's Crystal Ball	Lean D (flip)	November 2, 2020
Politico	Tossup	April 19, 2020
Daily Kos	Lean R	June 3, 2020
RCP	Tossup	June 9, 2020
Niskanen	Lean R	June 7, 2020
270toWin	Tossup	August 21, 2020

==== Polling ====
View source data.

Poll source	Date(s) administered	Sample size	Margin of error	Scott Perry (R)	Eugene DePasquale (D)	Other/ Undecided
Tarrance Group (R) (Note: Poll sponsored by Perry's campaign and the NRCC.)	October 13–15, 2020	400 (LV)	± 4.9%	48%	44%	8% (Note: Undecided with 8%)
GBAO Strategies (D) (Note: Poll conducted by DePasquale's campaign)	September 29 – October 2, 2020	500 (LV)	± 4.4%	45%	51%	–
Victoria Research (D) (Note: Poll sponsored by the House Majority PAC, an organization promoting the election of Democratic Congressional candidates.)	September 22–24, 2020	401 (LV)	± 4.9%	43%	50%	7% (Note: "Other/neither" with 2%; Undecided with 5%)
Pulse Research	August 18 – September 3, 2020	1,100 (LV)	± 2.9%	45% (Note: With voters who lean towards a given candidate)	44%	–
GBAO Strategies (D)	August 30 – September 1, 2020	500 (LV)	± 4.4%	46%	50%	–
DFM Research	August 6–9, 2020	384 (LV)	± 5.0%	44%	46%	10% (Note: Other with 1% and Undecided with 9%)
Victoria Research (D)	June, 2020	– (V)	–	50%	44%	–
GBAO Strategies (D)	May 28–31, 2020	600 (LV)	± 4.0%	50%	47%	–

Hypothetical polling

Poll source	Date(s) administered	Sample size	Margin of error	Generic Republican	Generic Democrat	Other	Undecided
Pennsylvania Survey Research (D)	September 22–24, 2020	401 (LV)	± 4.9%	44%	47%	2%	7% (Note: Includes "Refused")
GBAO Strategies (D)	August 30 – September 1, 2020	500 (LV)	± 4.4%	45%	46%	–	–
Pennsylvania Survey Research (D)	June, 2020	– (V)	–	47%	43%	–	–

==== Results ====
Pennsylvania's 10th congressional district election, 2020
Party	Candidate	Votes	%
Republican	Scott Perry (incumbent)	208,896	53.3
Democratic	Eugene DePasquale	182,938	46.7
Total votes		391,834	100.0
Republican hold			

== District 11 ==
2020 Pennsylvania's 11th congressional district election
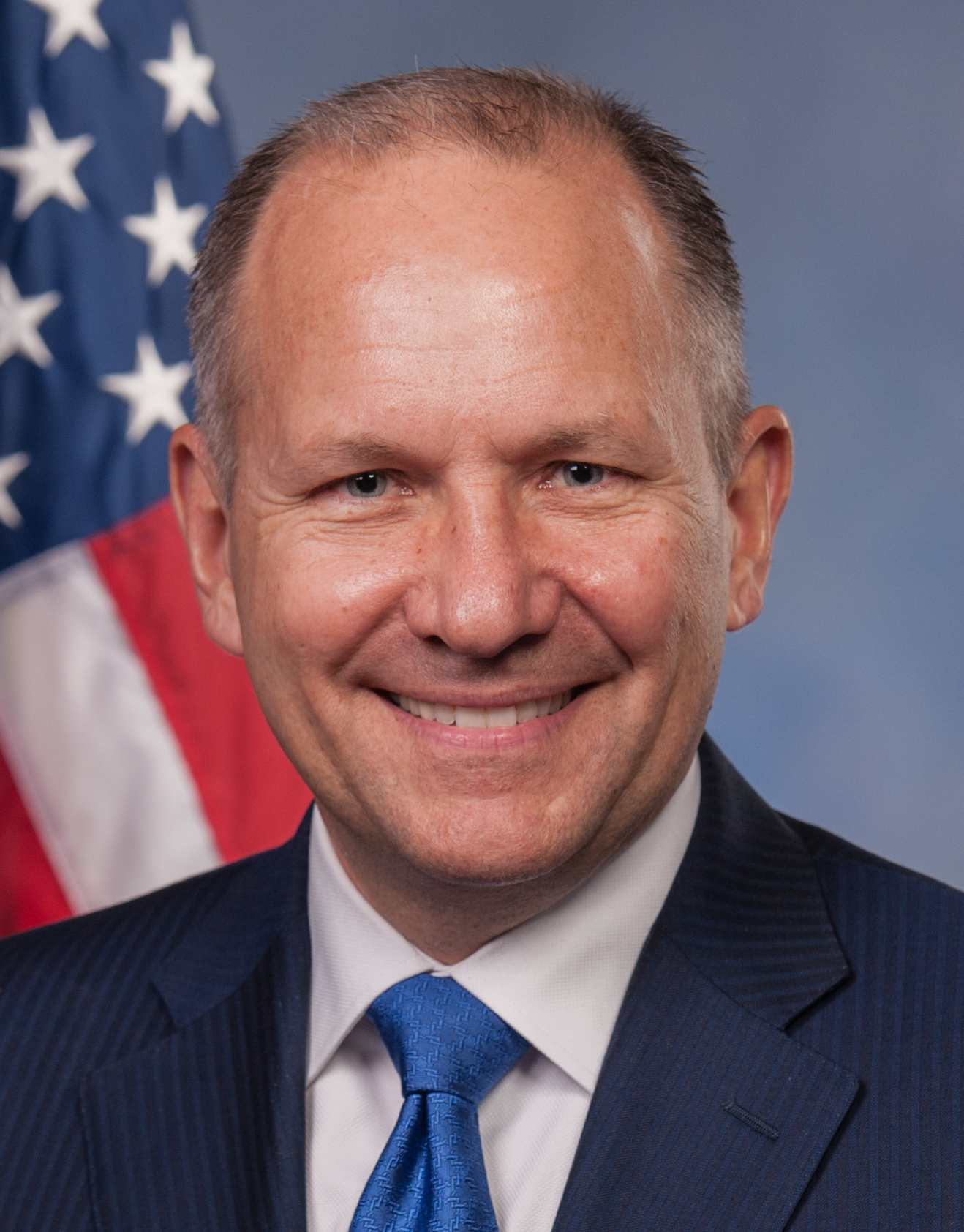

Nominee	Lloyd Smucker	Sarah Hammond
Party	Republican	Democratic
Popular vote	241,915	141,325
Percentage	63.1%	36.9%
- Precinct results Smucker: 50–60% 60–70% 70–80% 80–90% Hammond: 50–60% 60–70% 70–80% 80–90%
U.S. representative before election
Lloyd Smucker
Republican
Elected U.S. representative
Lloyd Smucker
Republican

The 11th district is located in South Central Pennsylvania, centering on Lancaster County and southern York County. The incumbent was Republican Lloyd Smucker, who was re-elected with 59.0% of the vote in 2018.

=== Republican primary ===
==== Candidates ====
===== Nominee =====
- Lloyd Smucker, incumbent U.S. representative

==== Primary results ====
Republican primary results
Party	Candidate	Votes	%
Republican	Lloyd Smucker (incumbent)	78,842	100.0
Total votes		78,842	100.0

=== Democratic primary ===
==== Candidates ====
===== Nominee =====
- Sarah Hammond, high school field hockey coach

===== Eliminated in primary =====
- Paul Daigle, university student employment manager

==== Endorsements ====
Sarah Hammond

Organizations

- LEAP Forward

==== Primary results ====
Democratic primary results
Party	Candidate	Votes	%
Democratic	Sarah Hammond	39,038	72.3
Democratic	Paul Daigle	14,936	27.7
Total votes		53,974	100.0

=== General election ===
==== Endorsements ====
Declined to endorse

Newspapers

- The York Dispatch

==== Predictions ====
Source	Ranking	As of
The Cook Political Report	Safe R	July 2, 2020
Inside Elections	Safe R	June 2, 2020
Sabato's Crystal Ball	Safe R	July 2, 2020
Politico	Safe R	April 19, 2020
Daily Kos	Safe R	June 3, 2020
RCP	Safe R	June 9, 2020
Niskanen	Safe R	June 7, 2020
270toWin	Safe R	August 21, 2020

==== Results ====
Pennsylvania's 11th congressional district election, 2020
Party	Candidate	Votes	%
Republican	Lloyd Smucker (incumbent)	241,915	63.1
Democratic	Sarah Hammond	141,325	36.9
Total votes		383,240	100.0
Republican hold			

== District 12 ==
2020 Pennsylvania's 12th congressional district election
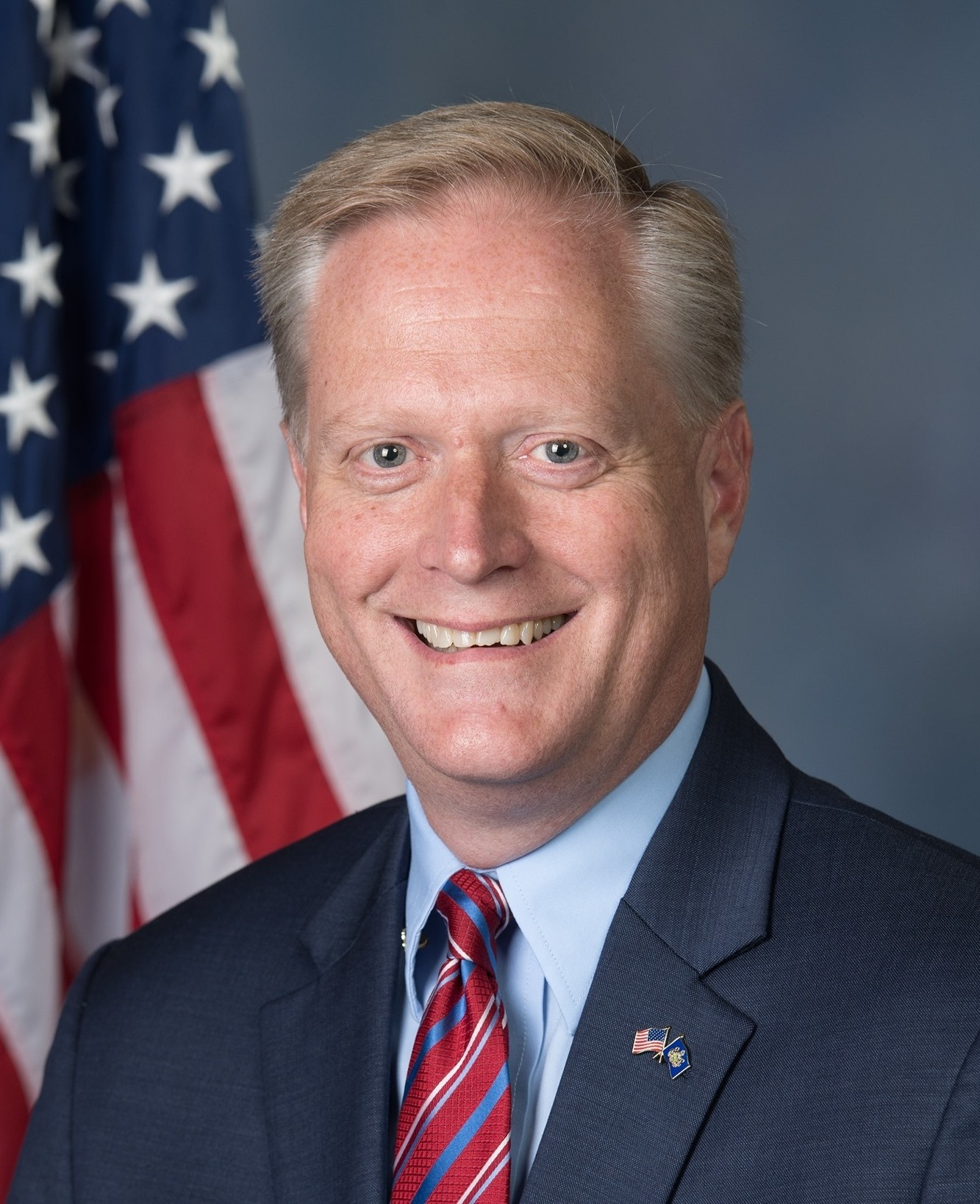

Nominee	Fred Keller	Lee Griffin
Party	Republican	Democratic
Popular vote	241,035	99,199
Percentage	70.8%	29.2%
- Keller: 50–60% 60–70% 70–80% 80–90% >90% Griffin: 50–60% 60–70% 70–80% 80–90%
U.S. representative before election
Fred Keller
Republican
Elected U.S. representative
Fred Keller
Republican

The 12th district encompasses rural North Central Pennsylvania, including Williamsport. The incumbent was Republican Fred Keller, who was elected in a 2019 special election with 68.1% of the vote.

=== Republican primary ===
==== Candidates ====
===== Nominee =====
- Fred Keller, incumbent U.S. representative

==== Endorsements ====
Fred Keller

U.S. presidents

- Donald Trump, 45th president of the United States

==== Primary results ====
Republican primary results
Party	Candidate	Votes	%
Republican	Fred Keller (incumbent)	87,886	100.0
Total votes		87,886	100.0

=== Democratic primary ===
==== Candidates ====
===== Nominee =====
- Lee Griffin, businessman

==== Primary results ====
Democratic primary results
Party	Candidate	Votes	%
Democratic	Lee Griffin	41,313	100.0
Total votes		41,313	100.0

=== Libertarian primary ===
==== Candidates ====
===== Nominee =====
- Elizabeth Terwilliger, speech-language pathologist

=== General election ===
==== Predictions ====
Source	Ranking	As of
The Cook Political Report	Safe R	July 2, 2020
Inside Elections	Safe R	June 2, 2020
Sabato's Crystal Ball	Safe R	July 2, 2020
Politico	Safe R	April 19, 2020
Daily Kos	Safe R	June 3, 2020
RCP	Safe R	June 9, 2020
Niskanen	Safe R	June 7, 2020
270toWin	Safe R	August 21, 2020

==== Results ====
Pennsylvania's 12th congressional district election, 2020
Party	Candidate	Votes	%
Republican	Fred Keller (incumbent)	241,035	70.8
Democratic	Lee Griffin	99,199	29.2
Total votes		340,234	100.0
Republican hold			

== District 13 ==
2020 Pennsylvania's 13th congressional district election
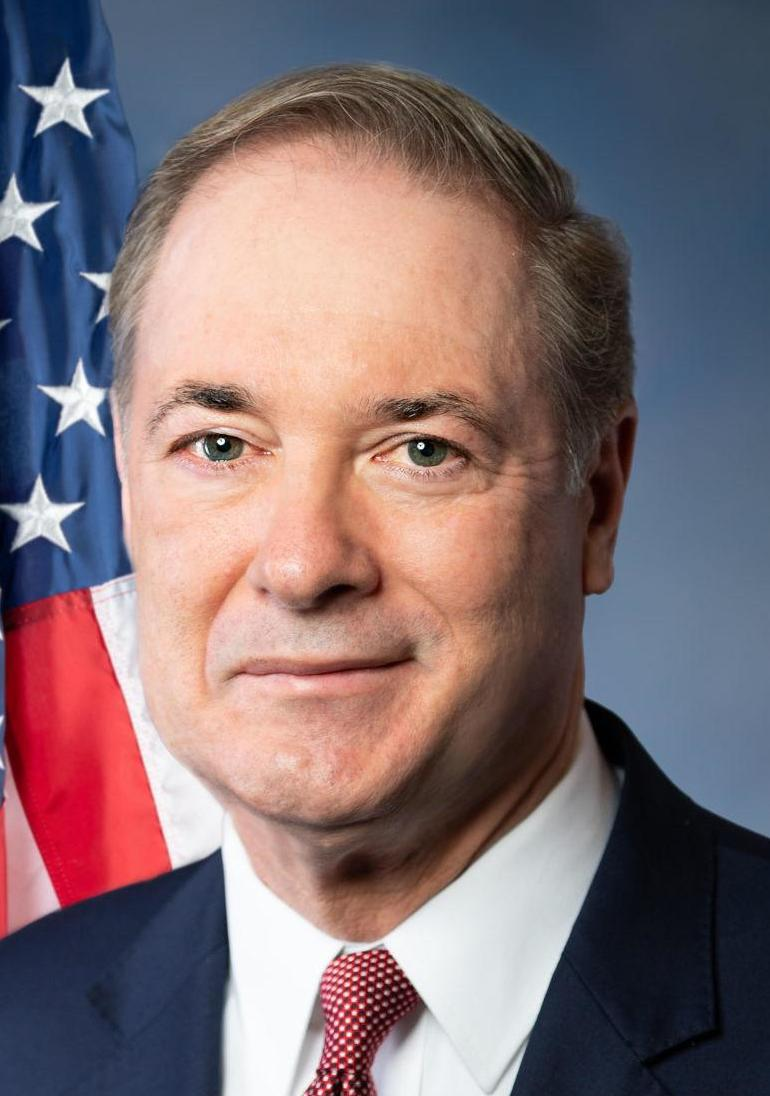

Nominee	John Joyce	Todd Rowley
Party	Republican	Democratic
Popular vote	267,789	96,612
Percentage	73.5%	26.5%
- Joyce: 50–60% 60–70% 70–80% 80–90% >90% Rowley: 50–60% 60–70% 70–80% Tie: 50% No data
U.S. representative before election
John Joyce
Republican
Elected U.S. representative
John Joyce
Republican

The 13th district encompasses rural southwestern Pennsylvania, including Altoona. The incumbent was Republican John Joyce, who was elected with 70.5% of the vote in 2018.

=== Republican primary ===
==== Candidates ====
===== Nominee =====
- John Joyce, incumbent U.S. representative

==== Endorsements ====
John Joyce

U.S. presidents

- Donald Trump, 45th president of the United States

==== Primary results ====
Republican primary results
Party	Candidate	Votes	%
Republican	John Joyce (incumbent)	94,171	100.0
Total votes		94,171	100.0

=== Democratic primary ===
==== Candidates ====
===== Nominee =====
- Todd Rowley, former FBI Agent, park ranger

==== Primary results ====
Democratic primary results
Party	Candidate	Votes	%
Democratic	Todd Rowley	41,988	100.0
Total votes		41,988	100.0

=== General election ===
==== Predictions ====
Source	Ranking	As of
The Cook Political Report	Safe R	July 2, 2020
Inside Elections	Safe R	June 2, 2020
Sabato's Crystal Ball	Safe R	July 2, 2020
Politico	Safe R	April 19, 2020
Daily Kos	Safe R	June 3, 2020
RCP	Safe R	June 9, 2020
Niskanen	Safe R	June 7, 2020
270toWin	Safe R	August 21, 2020

==== Results ====
Pennsylvania's 13th congressional district election, 2020
Party	Candidate	Votes	%
Republican	John Joyce (incumbent)	267,789	73.5
Democratic	Todd Rowley	96,612	26.5
Total votes		364,401	100.0
Republican hold			

== District 14 ==
2020 Pennsylvania's 14th congressional district election
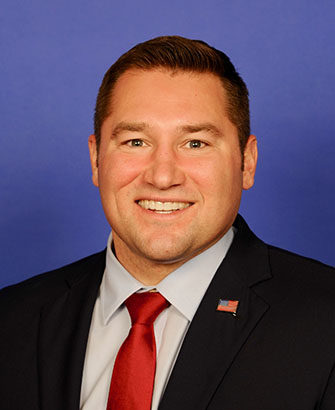

Nominee	Guy Reschenthaler	Bill Marx
Party	Republican	Democratic
Popular vote	241,688	131,895
Percentage	64.7%	35.3%
- Precinct results Reschenthaler: 40–50% 50–60% 60–70% 70–80% 80–90% >90% Marx: 50–60% 60–70% 70–80% Tie: 50%
U.S. representative before election
Guy Reschenthaler
Republican
Elected U.S. representative
Guy Reschenthaler
Republican

The 14th district encompasses the southern exurbs of Pittsburgh. The incumbent was Republican Guy Reschenthaler, who was elected with 57.9% of the vote in 2018.

=== Republican primary ===
==== Candidates ====
===== Nominee =====
- Guy Reschenthaler, incumbent U.S. representative

===== Endorsements =====
Guy Reschenthaler

U.S. presidents

- Donald Trump, 45th president of the United States

Organizations

- Humane Society of the United States

==== Primary results ====
Republican primary results
Party	Candidate	Votes	%
Republican	Guy Reschenthaler (incumbent)	66,671	100.0
Total votes		66,671	100.0

=== Democratic primary ===
==== Candidates ====
===== Nominee =====
- Bill Marx, high school teacher and U.S. Army veteran

==== Primary results ====
Democratic primary results
Party	Candidate	Votes	%
Democratic	Bill Marx	70,468	100.0
Total votes		70,468	100.0

=== General election ===
==== Predictions ====
Source	Ranking	As of
The Cook Political Report	Safe R	July 2, 2020
Inside Elections	Safe R	June 2, 2020
Sabato's Crystal Ball	Safe R	July 2, 2020
Politico	Safe R	April 19, 2020
Daily Kos	Safe R	June 3, 2020
RCP	Safe R	June 9, 2020
Niskanen	Safe R	June 7, 2020
270toWin	Safe R	August 21, 2020

==== Results ====
Pennsylvania's 14th congressional district election, 2020
Party	Candidate	Votes	%
Republican	Guy Reschenthaler (incumbent)	241,688	64.7
Democratic	Bill Marx	131,895	35.3
Total votes		373,583	100.0
Republican hold			

== District 15 ==
2020 Pennsylvania's 15th congressional district election
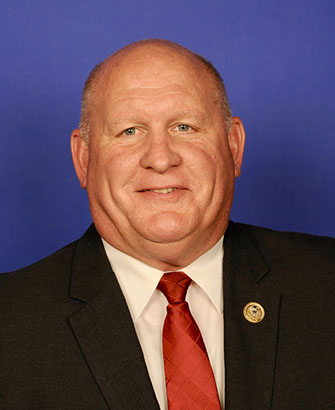

Nominee	Glenn Thompson	Robert Williams
Party	Republican	Democratic
Popular vote	255,058	92,156
Percentage	73.5%	26.5%
- Precinct results Thompson: 50–60% 60–70% 70–80% 80–90% >90% Williams: 50–60% 60–70% 70–80% No data
U.S. representative before election
Glenn Thompson
Republican
Elected U.S. representative
Glenn Thompson
Republican

The 15th district is located in rural North Central Pennsylvania. The incumbent was Republican Glenn Thompson, who was re-elected with 67.8% of the vote in 2018.

=== Republican primary ===
==== Candidates ====
===== Nominee =====
- Glenn Thompson, incumbent U.S. representative

==== Endorsements ====
Glenn Thompson

U.S. presidents

- Donald Trump, 45th president of the United States

Organizations

- Humane Society

==== Primary results ====
Republican primary results
Party	Candidate	Votes	%
Republican	Glenn Thompson (incumbent)	88,364	100.0
Total votes		88,364	100.0

=== Democratic primary ===
==== Candidates ====
===== Nominee =====
- Robert Williams, minister

==== Primary results ====
Democratic primary results
Party	Candidate	Votes	%
Democratic	Robert Williams	48,714	100.0
Total votes		48,714	100.0

=== General election ===
==== Predictions ====
Source	Ranking	As of
The Cook Political Report	Safe R	July 2, 2020
Inside Elections	Safe R	June 2, 2020
Sabato's Crystal Ball	Safe R	July 2, 2020
Politico	Safe R	April 19, 2020
Daily Kos	Safe R	June 3, 2020
RCP	Safe R	June 9, 2020
Niskanen	Safe R	June 7, 2020
270toWin	Safe R	August 21, 2020

==== Results ====
Pennsylvania's 15th congressional district election, 2020
Party	Candidate	Votes	%
Republican	Glenn Thompson (incumbent)	255,058	73.5
Democratic	Robert Williams	92,156	26.5
Total votes		347,214	100.0
Republican hold			

== District 16 ==
2020 Pennsylvania's 16th congressional district election
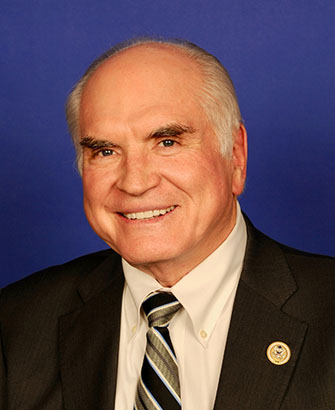

Nominee	Mike Kelly	Kristy Gnibus
Party	Republican	Democratic
Popular vote	210,088	143,962
Percentage	59.3%	40.7%
- Precinct results Kelly: 50–60% 60–70% 70–80% 80–90% >90% Gnibus: 40–50% 50–60% 60–70% 70–80% 80–90% Tie: 50%
U.S. representative before election
Mike Kelly
Republican
Elected U.S. representative
Mike Kelly
Republican

The 16th district is located in the northwestern portion of the state, and covers all of Erie, Crawford, Mercer, and Lawrence counties, as well as much of Butler County. The incumbent was Republican Mike Kelly, who was re-elected with 51.6% of the vote in 2018.

=== Republican primary ===
==== Candidates ====
===== Nominee =====
- Mike Kelly, incumbent U.S. representative

==== Endorsements ====
Mike Kelly

U.S. presidents

- Donald Trump, 45th president of the United States

==== Primary results ====
Republican primary results
Party	Candidate	Votes	%
Republican	Mike Kelly (incumbent)	68,199	100.0
Total votes		68,199	100.0

=== Democratic primary ===
==== Candidates ====
===== Nominee =====
- Kristy Gnibus, teacher

===== Withdrew =====
- Edward DeSantis, Mercer County resident and working class advocate (withdrew and endorsed Gnibus)
- Daniel Smith Jr., bank manager and candidate for Pennsylvania House of Representatives in 2018 (running for Pennsylvania House of Representatives, District 12)

===== Declined =====
- Ryan Bizzarro, state representative

==== Primary results ====
Democratic primary results
Party	Candidate	Votes	%
Democratic	Kristy Gnibus	63,640	100.0
Total votes		63,640	100.0

=== General election ===
==== Predictions ====
Source	Ranking	As of
The Cook Political Report	Likely R	October 8, 2020
Inside Elections	Safe R	June 2, 2020
Sabato's Crystal Ball	Safe R	July 2, 2020
Politico	Lean R	April 19, 2020
Daily Kos	Safe R	June 3, 2020
RCP	Safe R	June 9, 2020
Niskanen	Safe R	June 7, 2020
270toWin	Safe R	August 21, 2020

==== Polling ====
Poll source	Date(s) administered	Sample size	Margin of error	Mike Kelly (R)	Kristy Gnibus (D)	Undecided
Public Policy Polling (D) (Note: Poll sponsored by Gnibus' campaign)	June 22–23, 2020	726 (V)	± 3.6%	48%	40%	12%

==== Results ====
Pennsylvania's 16th congressional district election, 2020
Party	Candidate	Votes	%
Republican	Mike Kelly (incumbent)	210,088	59.3
Democratic	Kristy Gnibus	143,962	40.7
Total votes		354,050	100.0
Republican hold			

== District 17 ==
2020 Pennsylvania's 17th congressional district election
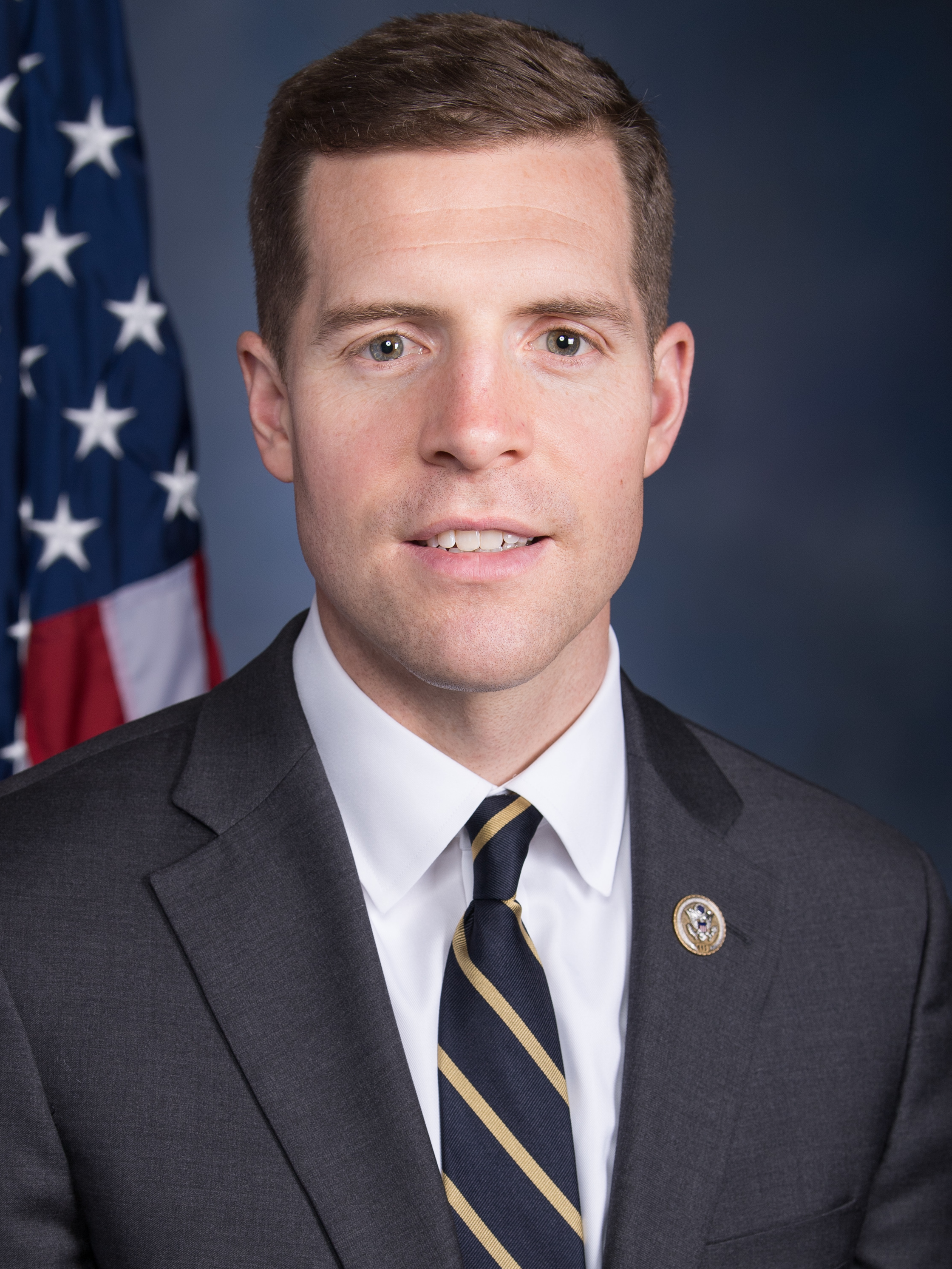

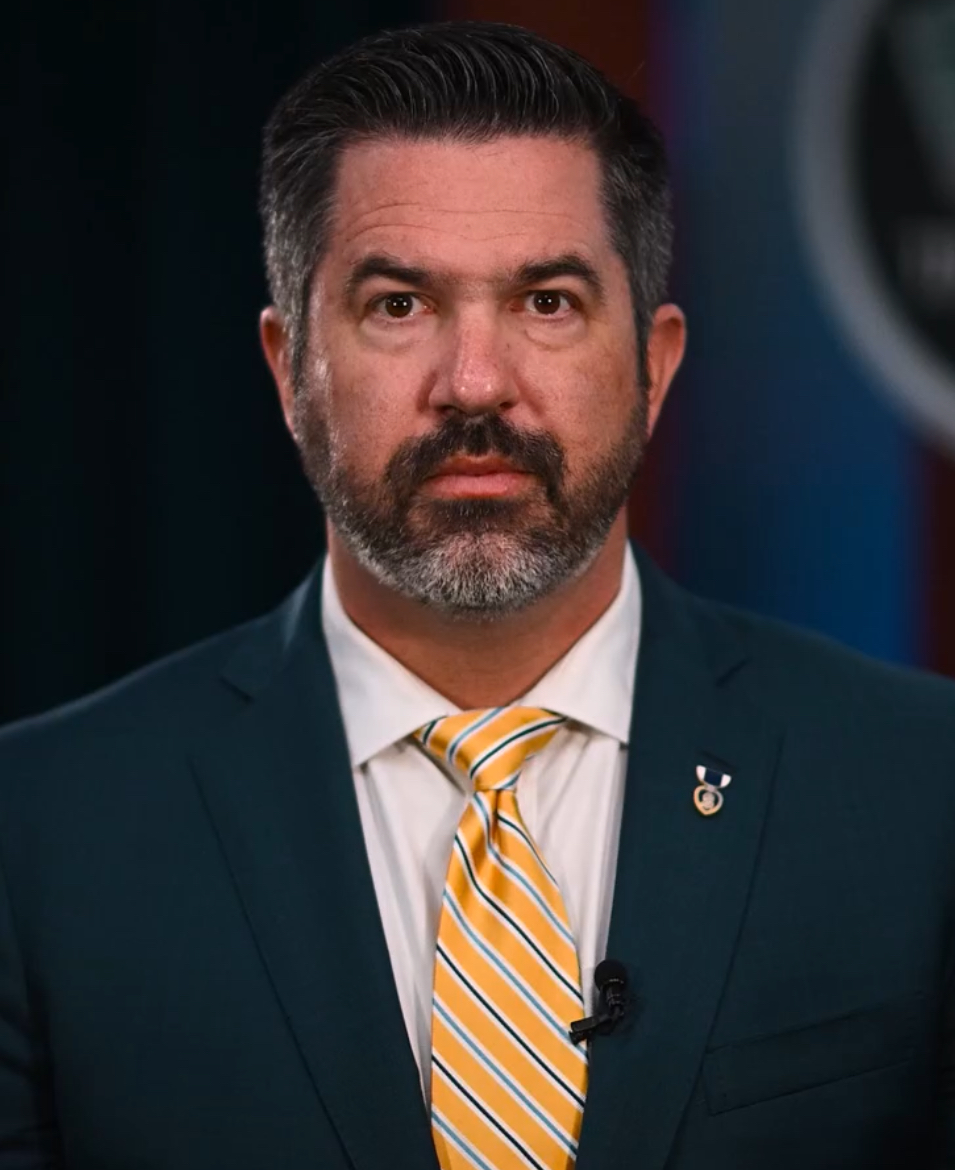
Nominee	Conor Lamb	Sean Parnell
Party	Democratic	Republican
Popular vote	222,253	212,284
Percentage	51.1%	48.9%
- Precinct results Lamb: 50–60% 60–70% 70–80% 80–90% >90% Parnell: 50–60% 60–70% 70–80% 80–90% Tie: 50%
U.S. representative before election
Conor Lamb
Democratic
Elected U.S. representative
Conor Lamb
Democratic

The 17th district encompasses the northwestern Pittsburgh suburbs, including Beaver County, the southwestern corner of Butler County, and northern Allegheny County. The incumbent was Democrat Conor Lamb, who was re-elected with 56.3% of the vote in 2018.

=== Democratic primary ===
==== Candidates ====
===== Nominee =====
- Conor Lamb, incumbent U.S. representative

===== Endorsements =====
Conor Lamb

Organizations

- End Citizens United
- Giffords
- Humane Society
- J Street PAC
- Jewish Democratic Council of America
- Moms Demand Action
- Planned Parenthood Action Fund
- VoteVets

==== Primary results ====
Democratic primary results
Party	Candidate	Votes	%
Democratic	Conor Lamb (incumbent)	111,828	100.0
Total votes		111,828	100.0

=== Republican primary ===
==== Nominee ====
- Sean Parnell, U.S. Army veteran and author

==== Endorsements ====
Sean Parnell

U.S. presidents

- Donald Trump, president of the United States

Organizations

- National Federation of Independent Business

Newspapers and other media

- Pittsburgh Post-Gazette

==== Primary results ====
Republican primary results
Party	Candidate	Votes	%
Republican	Sean Parnell	60,253	100.0
Total votes		60,253	100.0

=== General election ===
==== Predictions ====
Source	Ranking	As of
The Cook Political Report	Likely D	November 2, 2020
Inside Elections	Safe D	October 28, 2020
Sabato's Crystal Ball	Likely D	July 2, 2020
Politico	Lean D	April 19, 2020
Daily Kos	Likely D	June 3, 2020
RCP	Lean D	October 24, 2020
Niskanen	Safe D	June 7, 2020
270toWin	Likely D	August 21, 2020

==== Polling ====
Poll source	Date(s) administered	Sample size	Margin of error	Conor Lamb (D)	Sean Parnell (R)	Undecided
OnMessage Inc. (R) (Note: Poll sponsored by Sean Parnell's campaign)	September 2–3, 2020	400 (LV)	–	45%	44%	11%
OnMessage Inc. (R)	July 27–29, 2020	400 (LV)	–	50%	41%	9%
OnMessage Inc. (R)	March 9–11, 2020	400 (LV)	–	54%	36%	10%

==== Results ====
Pennsylvania's 17th congressional district election, 2020
Party	Candidate	Votes	%
Democratic	Conor Lamb (incumbent)	222,253	51.1
Republican	Sean Parnell	212,284	48.9
Total votes		434,537	100.0
Democratic hold			

== District 18 ==
2020 Pennsylvania's 18th congressional district election
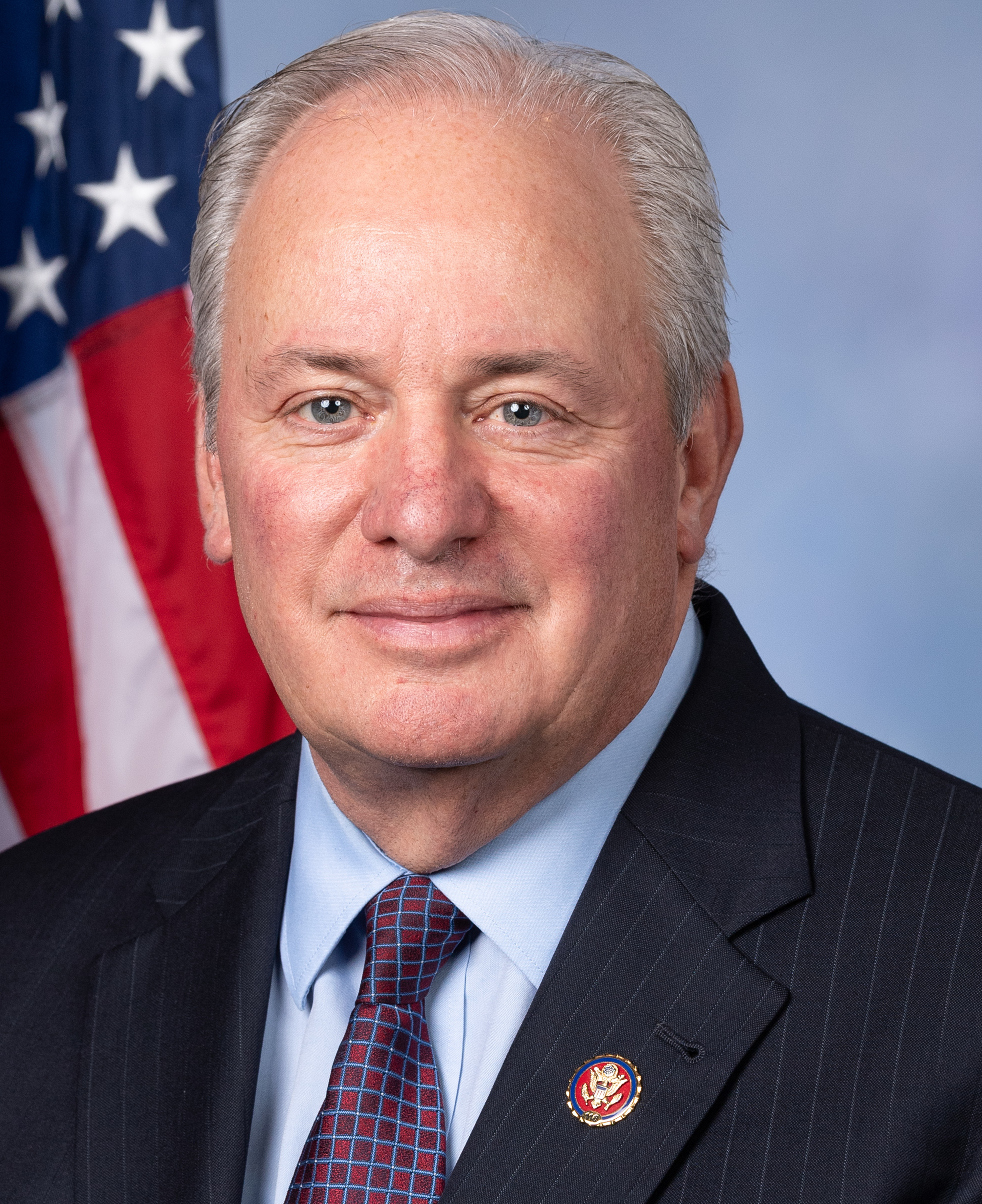

Nominee	Mike Doyle	Luke Negron
Party	Democratic	Republican
Popular vote	266,084	118,163
Percentage	69.3%	30.7%
- Precinct results Doyle: 50–60% 60–70% 70–80% 80–90% >90% Negron: 40–50% 50–60% 60–70% Tie: 40–50% No data
U.S. representative before election
Mike Doyle
Democratic
Elected U.S. representative
Mike Doyle
Democratic

The 18th district includes the entire city of Pittsburgh and parts of surrounding suburbs. The incumbent was Democrat Mike Doyle, who was re-elected unopposed in 2018.

=== Democratic primary ===
==== Nominee ====
- Mike Doyle, incumbent U.S. representative

==== Eliminated in primary ====
- Jerry Dickinson, law professor

==== Disqualified ====
- Janis Brooks, former pastor and nonprofit founder

==== Endorsements ====
Mike Doyle

Organizations

- Humane Society
- J Street PAC
- Pennsylvania AFL–CIO
- Sierra Club

==== Primary results ====
Democratic primary results
Party	Candidate	Votes	%
Democratic	Mike Doyle (incumbent)	90,353	67.2
Democratic	Jerry Dickinson	44,170	32.8
Total votes		134,523	100.0

=== Republican primary ===
==== Candidates ====
===== Nominee =====
- Luke Negron, Pennsylvania Air National Guard military member

==== Primary results ====
Republican primary results
Party	Candidate	Votes	%
Republican	Luke Negron	30,497	100.0
Total votes		30,497	100.0

=== Independents ===
==== Candidates ====
===== Declared =====
- Donald Nevills, Navy veteran and business owner (write-in)
- Daniel Vayda (write-in)

=== General election ===
==== Predictions ====
Source	Ranking	As of
The Cook Political Report	Safe D	June 26, 2020
Inside Elections	Safe D	June 2, 2020
Sabato's Crystal Ball	Safe D	July 2, 2020
Politico	Safe D	April 19, 2020
Daily Kos	Safe D	June 3, 2020
RCP	Safe D	June 9, 2020
Niskanen	Safe D	June 7, 2020
270toWin	Safe D	August 21, 2020

==== Results ====
Pennsylvania's 18th congressional district election, 2020
Party	Candidate	Votes	%
Democratic	Mike Doyle (incumbent)	266,084	69.3
Republican	Luke Negron	118,163	30.7
Total votes		384,247	100.0
Democratic hold			

== See also ==
- 2020 Pennsylvania elections

== Notes ==
Partisan clients
