= William Edward Sell =

American law school president

W. Edward Sell
- Bronze bust and plaque honoring Sell's 50th year of teaching at Pitt.
- Born: 1923
- Died: August 15, 2004 (aged 80–81)
- Scientific career
- Fields: Business law
- Workplaces: University of Pittsburgh School of Law

W. Edward Sell (1923 – August 15, 2004) was the dean of the University of Pittsburgh School of Law from 1966 through 1977.

== Education ==
He graduated from Washington & Jefferson College in 1945. He earned his J.D. from Yale Law School in 1947.

== Tenure at University of Pittsburgh School of Law ==
He became a professor at University of Pittsburgh School of Law in 1947. As a professor, he received the "Excellence in Teaching Award" in 1986. He served as Chair of the Administrative Committee from 1965 through 1966.

== Honors ==
Professor Peter B. Oh is the current W. Edward Sell Professor of Business Law at the University of Pittsburgh School of Law.

The University of Pittsburgh chapter of the American Inns of Court is named after Sell. He is also the namesake of the American Inns of Court's "W. Edward Sell Inn Honors Professionalism Award."

Washington & Jefferson College awards the "W. Edward Sell Legal Achievement Award" annually at homecoming.
