= Jerry Dickinson =

American legal scholar (born 1987)

- Dickinson in 2026

Dean of the University of Pittsburgh School of Law
- Incumbent
- Assumed office January 15, 2025
- Preceded by: Mary Crossley (interim)

Personal details
- Born: 1987 (age 38–39) Pittsburgh, Pennsylvania, U.S.
- Education: College of the Holy Cross (BA); University of the Witwatersrand (LLM); Fordham University (JD)

Gerald S. Dickinson (born 1987) is an American legal scholar. He has been the dean of the University of Pittsburgh School of Law since 2025.

== Early life and education ==
Dickinson was born in Pittsburgh, Pennsylvania, and was raised in a foster home in Allegheny County, Pennsylvania. He graduated from the College of the Holy Cross with a B.A. in political science and sociology with honors in 2009. As an undergraduate at Holy Cross, he wrote a senior thesis titled, "The Section 8 Program: The Role of Housing Policy Design in Facilitating Black Neighborhood Movement and Social Mobility".

After graduating from Holy Cross, Dickinson was awarded a Fulbright Scholarship to pursue graduate studies in South Africa at the University of the Witwatersrand, where he earned an LL.M. with honors in 2010. He then earned his Juris Doctor (J.D.) with honors from the Fordham University School of Law, where he became the editor-in-chief of the Fordham Environmental Law Review, in 2013.

== Career ==
After law school, Dickinson worked as an associate attorney at the law firm of Reed Smith in Pittsburgh, Pennsylvania, from 2013 to 2015. He then served as a law clerk for Chief Judge Theodore McKee of the United States Court of Appeals for the Third Circuit from 2015 to 2016.

Dickinson became an assistant professor of law at the University of Pittsburgh in 2017. In April 2019, he announced a bid to challenge U.S. Representative Mike Doyle in the Democratic primaries for Pennsylvania's 18th congressional district. He placed third in the 2020 House of Representatives election in Pennsylvania. He then became an associate professor at Pitt Law in 2020. He served as its vice-dean from 2023 to 2025, was promoted to a full professorship in 2024, and was named the dean of the University of Pittsburgh School of Law in January 2025. He assumed the office on January 15, 2025. When he was appointed, Dickinson was the youngest law school dean in the country at the time.
