= Pittsburgh Tax Review =

- Discipline: Law review
- Language: English
- Edited by: Oladimeji Babalola

Publication details
- History: 2003–present
- Publisher: University of Pittsburgh School of Law (United States)
- Frequency: Semi-annual

Standard abbreviations
- Bluebook: Pitt. Tax Rev.
- ISO 4: Pittsburgh Tax Rev.

Indexing
- ISSN: 1932-1821

Links
- Journal homepage

The Pittsburgh Tax Review is a journal of legal scholarship published by an independent student group at University of Pittsburgh School of Law. The Pittsburgh Tax Review has repeatedly been ranked among the top tax journals in the United States. The only journal at the University of Pittsburgh School of Law that is peer-reviewed, the Pittsburgh Tax Review publishes twice yearly and highlights articles by professors and practitioners in the field of taxation, as well as student notes and articles that exhibit exemplary insight into the field of taxation. The journal began publication in 2003. This journal provides immediate open access to its content.
