= Mass media in Pittsburgh =

Pittsburgh is home to the first commercial radio station in the United States, KDKA 1020AM, the first community-sponsored television station in the United States, WQED 13, the first "networked" television station and the first station in the country to broadcast 24 hours a day, 7 days a week, KDKA 2, and the first newspaper published west of the Allegheny Mountains, the Pittsburgh Post-Gazette.

== History ==
Until 2016, Pittsburgh was one of the few mid-sized metropolitan areas in the U.S. with two major daily papers; both the Pittsburgh Post-Gazette and the Pittsburgh Tribune-Review have histories of breaking in-depth investigative news stories on a national scale. In 2016, the Tribune-Review moved to an all-digital format.

The Post-Gazette moved to publishing five print editions a week in 2018, three print editions a week in 2019, and two print editions a week in 2021.

The alternative papers in the region include the Pittsburgh City Paper, the Pittsburgh Jewish Chronicle, The New People, which is published weekly by the Thomas Merton Center for Peace and Social Justice, the New Pittsburgh Courier, which is one of the larger ethnic publications in the region, and Zajedničar, the only Croatian-language newspaper that is currently published in the United States.

The Pitt News, a financially independent, student-produced newspaper of the University of Pittsburgh, has operated for roughly a century. The University of Pittsburgh School of Law also hosts JURIST, the world's only university-based legal news service.

== Newspapers ==
This is a list of newspapers in Pittsburgh, including print and online.

Pittsburgh 'major newspaper' consolidation timeline

- Major newspapers:
  - Pittsburgh Post-Gazette
  - Pittsburgh Tribune-Review
- Alternative newspapers:
  - Pittsburgh City Paper
- Specialty newspapers:
  - The Bulletin
  - The Citizen (Pittsburgh) (Est. 1976. Serving Northern Pittsburgh)
  - The Front Weekly
  - Green Tree Times (western city neighborhoods and suburbs)
  - NewPeople (Published by Thomas Merton Center)
  - Northside Chronicle (northern city neighborhoods)
  - Payday Report (labor and union)
  - Pittsburgh Business Times
  - Pittsburgh Catholic
  - New Pittsburgh Courier (African-American community)
  - Pittsburgh Jewish Chronicle
  - Pittsburgh Patrika (Est 1995. Indian population)
  - Print (eastern city neighborhoods)
  - Pittsburgh Lesbian Correspondents
  - The Pittsburgh Reporter
  - Zajedničar
- Academic newspapers:
  - The Duquesne Duke
  - The Pitt News
  - The (CMU) Tartan
  - University Times
  - The (PPU) Globe
- Online newspapers:
  - The Incline
  - NEXTPittsburgh
  - Pittsburgh Institute for Nonprofit Journalism (PINJ)
  - The Pittsburgh Independent
  - PublicSource
- Podcasts
  - City Cast Pittsburgh

== Magazines and journals ==
- Variety:
  - LOCALPittsburgh Magazine
  - Pittsburgh Magazine
  - Pittsburgh Parent
  - Pittsburgh Quarterly
  - Table Magazine
  - WHIRL Magazine
- Academic:
  - Contemporaneity: Historical Presence in Visual Culture (digital journal)
  - Creative Nonfiction (magazine)
  - Hot Metal Bridge
  - Journal of Law and Commerce
  - Pittsburgh Journal of Environmental and Public Health Law
  - Pittsburgh Journal of Technology Law & Policy
  - Pittsburgh Tax Review
  - Sampsonia Way Magazine
  - Three Rivers Review
  - University of Pittsburgh Law Review
- Promotional/Alumni
  - Carlow University Magazine (Carlow University)
  - Connected (La Roche University)
  - Pitt Magazine (University of Pittsburgh)
  - Pitt Med (University of Pittsburgh Health Sciences)
  - The Point (Point Park University)

== Television ==
The Pittsburgh TV market is currently ranked as the 23rd largest in the United States by Nielsen. It has recently gained distinction as one of the most competitive. (In the listing below the table, network O&O's are denoted in bold.) The market is served by:

Channel	Call Sign	Network	Since	Digital subchannel	Digital Subchannel	Owner
2	**KDKA**	CBS	1949 (Jan. 11)	Start TV		CBS
4	WTAE	ABC	1958 (Sept. 14)	Cozi TV	--	Hearst
11	WPXI	NBC	1957 (Sept. 1)	Me-TV	--	Cox Media
13	WQED	PBS	1954 (Apr. 1)	Create	Neighborhood	
16	WEPA-CD	Cozi TV	1989 (Feb. 28)	Movies!		OTA Broadcasting
19	WPKD-TV	Independent	1953 (Oct. 15)			CBS
22	WPNT	The CW (primary); MyNetworkTV (secondary)	1978 (Sept. 26)			Sinclair
31	WIIC-LD		1989 (Aug. 29)			Abacus Television
39	WBYD-CD	JTV	1990 (Jul. 25)			Perez Broadcasting
38	**WINP**	ION	1953 (Aug. 31)	Bounce TV	Court TV	Ion Media
50	**WPCB**	Cornerstone	1979 (Apr. 15)			Cornerstone
53	WPGH	Fox	1953 (July 14)	ZUUSCountry		Sinclair

- VHF:
  - **KDKA 2** (CBS)
  - WTAE 4 (ABC)
  - WPXI 11 (NBC)
  - WQED 13 (PBS)
    - This PBS member station is a major contributor to national media as the source for Mister Rogers' Neighborhood, National Geographic Explorer, Where in the World Is Carmen Sandiego?, and Daniel Tiger's Neighborhood.
- UHF:
  - WEPA-CD 16
  - WPKD-TV 19 (Independent)
  - WPNT 22 (The CW/MyNetworkTV)
  - WIIC-LD 31
  - WBYD-CD 39
  - **WINP 38** (Ion)
  - **WPCB 40** (Cornerstone)
  - WPGH 53 (FOX)
  - WOSC 61 (Rewind)
- Cable television stations:
  - Pitt Panthers TV
  - Pittsburgh Cable News Channel
  - SportsNet Pittsburgh
- Digital television stations:
  - KNNP-TV

== Radio ==
Pittsburgh radio has long been dominated by KDKA 1020 AM. However, as of early 2006 the station is no longer No. 1 in the ratings. KQV 1410 AM, now an all-news outlet, was Pittsburgh's dominant Top 40 station throughout the 1960s. On the FM dial, album-rock WDVE (102.5 DVE), modern rock WXDX (105.9 The X), adult contemporary WBZZ (Star 100.7), pop and hip-hop WKST-FM (96.1 KissFM) and Pittsburgh Sports Talk on (93.7 The Fan) KDKA-FM FM talk radio is available in the Pittsburgh market at WPGB (104.7 FM NewsTalk). Pittsburgh is also home to three public radio stations: WESA, the local NPR station; WQED-FM, a listener-supported commercial-free classical music station; and WYEP 91.3FM, the nation's third-largest independent "adult album alternative" (AAA) station, which hosts the locally produced environmental radio show The Allegheny Front and also carries some NPR programming. The Radio Information Service, broadcasting on a subcarrier of WESA provides special programming for the blind and print impaired. Additionally, Pittsburgh hosts the non-commercial radio stations WRCT (affiliated with Carnegie Mellon University) and WPTS (affiliated with the University of Pittsburgh).

== DMA ==
In 2010, Nielsen will continue to rank Pittsburgh as the 23rd largest television Designated Market Area (DMA) in the country, with 1,154,950 households. That is a drop from Nielsen's 2009 estimate of 1,156,460. Despite the decline in households, Pittsburgh still has 22,090 more households than the next closest television DMA which is Charlotte, NC.

In 2004 Pittsburgh was the 24th largest DMA in the U.S. as ranked by population, with a population of 2,881,200. Pittsburgh's DMA covers a land area of 10,083 square miles (26,110 km^{2}) in three states.

Other definitions of the "Greater Pittsburgh" area extend into Ohio border counties with some sources including several Ohio counties and as far south and west as the Kentucky border and north into the extreme southwest of New York State.

The Pittsburgh DMA includes the following counties:

Pennsylvania counties:

- Allegheny
- Armstrong
- Beaver
- Butler
- Clarion
- Fayette
- Forest
- Greene
- Indiana
- Lawrence
- Venango
- Washington
- Westmoreland

West Virginia counties:

- Monongalia
- Preston

Maryland counties:

- Garrett
