= The Pitt News =

Newspaper for the University of Pittsburgh

- The September 26, 2008 front page of The Pitt News
- Type: Student newspaper
- Format: Tabloid
- Owner: Independent
- Founded: 1910, as The Pitt Weekly
- Headquarters: Pittsburgh, Pennsylvania
- Circulation: 13,000
- Website: www.pittnews.com

The Pitt News is an independent, student-written and student-managed newspaper for the main campus of the University of Pittsburgh in the Oakland neighborhood of Pittsburgh. The Pitt News has been active in some form since 1910 and is published online Monday through Friday, and in print on Wednesdays, during the regular academic year and Wednesdays during the summer.

== About ==
According to the constitution of The Pitt News, the organization's purpose is "to prepare and publish a high-quality newspaper, to provide experience for its members in all facets of the journalism profession, to provide a voice for the students of the university, and to provide a public forum for the university community."

The Pitt News is a million-dollar non-profit operation employing more than 100 undergraduate writers, roughly 25 students in the business division and three professional staff members. The paper includes five regular sections: news, opinions, culture, sports, and classifieds. It also produces about a dozen special issues a year, such as the dining, employment and rental guides. During the school year, circulation includes 13,000 copies an issue, distributed at approximately 100 sites. During the summer, the paper is published weekly each Wednesday with a circulation of 10,000. Currently, The Pitt News is printed by the Butler Color Press on tabloid-sized newsprint.

Overseeing The Pitt News is the Pitt News Advisory Board, which serves as publisher, and, according to its constitution, works to "advise students, support the freedom of the student press and further the educational mission of The Pitt News." The board consists of the editor-in-chief, the business manager, two other Pitt News employees, at least one non-Pitt News student at the university, local journalists, university journalism and business professors, and area businesspeople.

== History ==
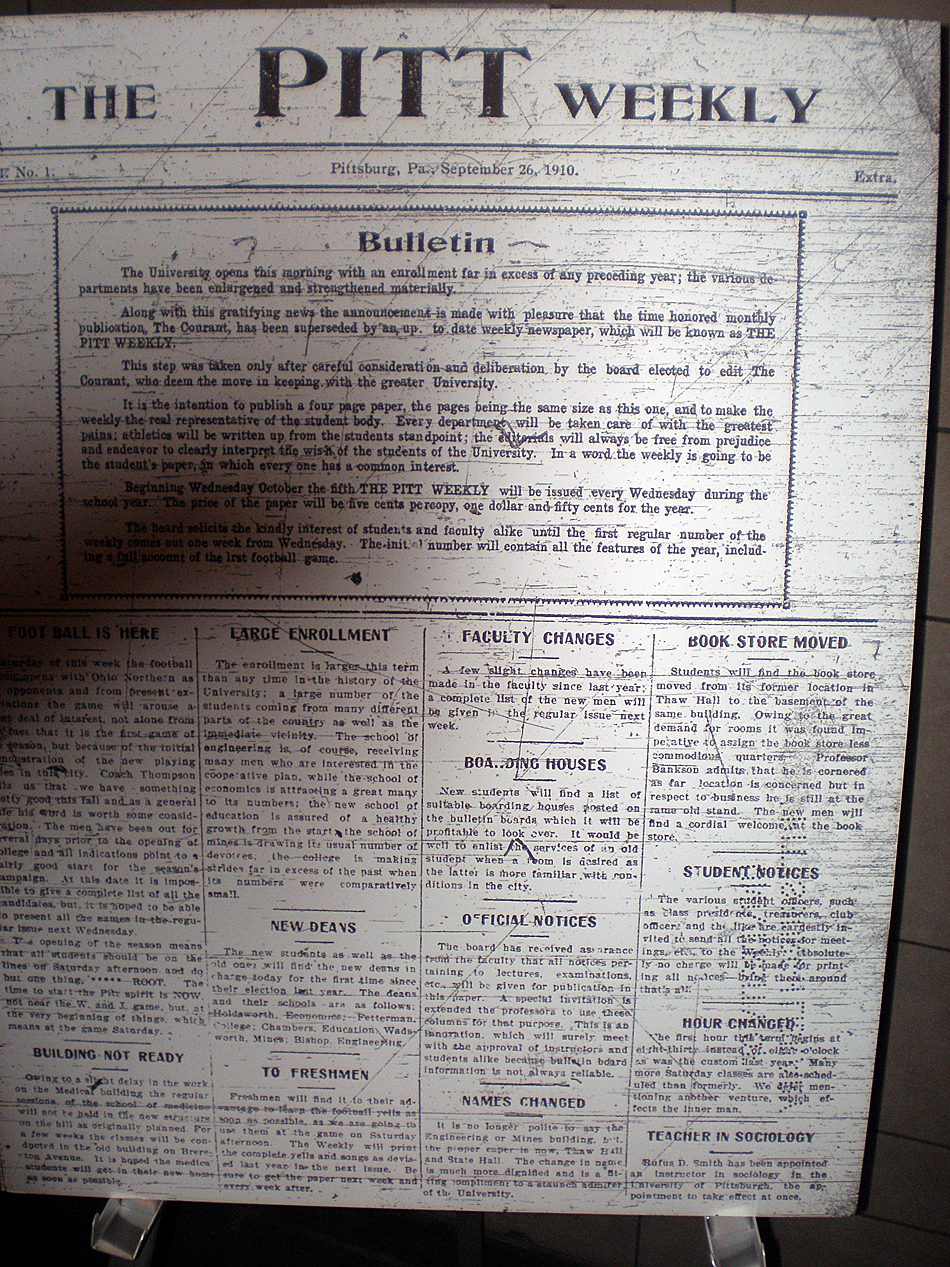
A display of a copy of the first edition of The Pitt News, then called The Pitt Weekly and published on September 26, 1910, was on display during homecoming festivities in 2010 in celebration of the newspaper's 100th year of publication

Started in the late 19th century as a quarterly literary magazine, The Courant is the earliest traceable ancestor of The Pitt News. By 1910, it had morphed into a weekly student newspaper called The Pitt Weekly, which premiered on September 26 of that year. Gradually, the paper began adding days to its production schedule. By the 1970s it was a business daily (Monday–Friday) paper. The Pitt News has remained an editorially independent, student-run newspaper funded by a student-run business staff, which provides revenue for the paper via ad sales.

On September 17, 1992, the Pitt News published the name of a sexual assault victim. Four days later, the Pitt News apologized for printing the victim's name. Pitt News editor in chief Jason Hillman said, "It was a mistake... no one was specifically responsible." Julie Sabol, the Pitt News employee who wrote the article, resigned her position as news editor, and said, "I left because of ideological differences with the editor in chief... The name of the victim was not put in the paper intentionally or with any malicious will."

In 2004 The Pitt News, in the Third U.S. Circuit Court of appeals, overthrew PA Act: 199, which previously prevented Pennsylvania college newspapers from running advertisements making any mention of alcohol. The ACLU represented The Pitt News against the Pennsylvania Liquor Control Board. The opinion was written by now-Supreme Court Justice Samuel Alito.

== Notable alumni ==
- Leonard Baker - Pulitzer Prize–winning biographer
- Michael Chabon - Pulitzer Prize–winning writer, "The Amazing Adventures of Kavalier & Clay", "Wonder Boys".
- Murray Chass - Sports journalist for The New York Times; recipient of the J. G. Taylor Spink Award.
- Myron Cope - Color commentator for the Pittsburgh Steelers.
- Michael Clinton - Executive vice president, chief marketing officer, and publishing director of Hearst Magazines. He was business manager for The Pitt News.
- Sharon G. Flake - award-winning author of young adult literature.
- Chris Kuzneski - International bestselling author of The Prophecy, The Lost Throne, and Sword of God.
- Neal Russo - Sportswriter for The St. Louis Post-Dispatch and the Sporting News.
- Anthony Breznican, Senior Hollywood Correspondent at Vanity Fair.
- Katelyn Polantz, correspondent, CNN

== See also ==
- University Times
- WPTS-FM
