= John Moore (director) =

Irish film director and producer (born 1970)

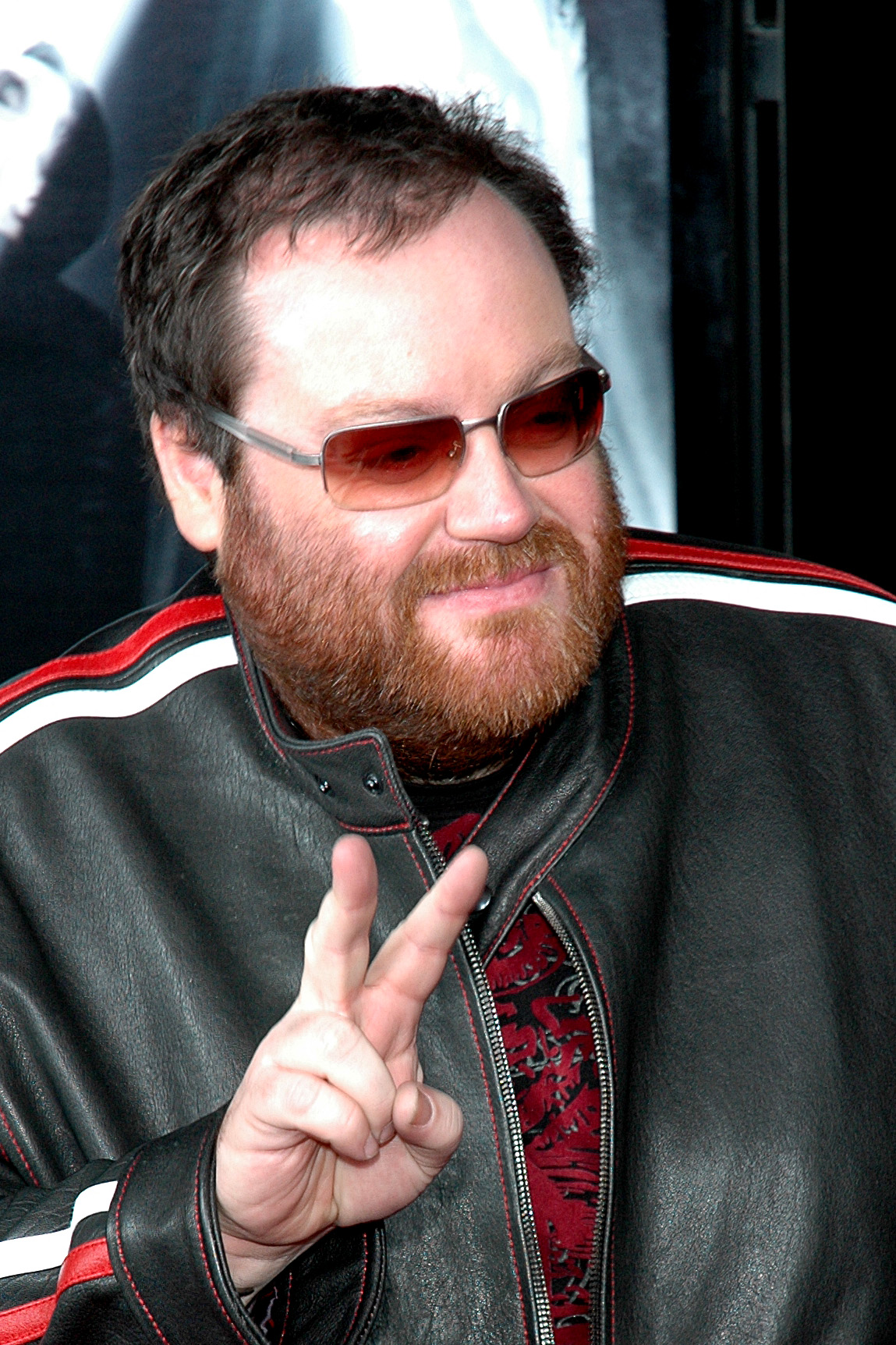
- Moore at the premiere of Max Payne on 13 October 2008
- Born: 1 January 1970 (age 56); Dundalk, Ireland
- Occupations: Director, producer, writer
- Years active: 1990–2016
- Spouse: Fiona Connon (m. 2005)
- Children: 1

John Moore (born 1 January 1970) is an Irish film director and producer whose credits include the action war film Behind Enemy Lines and A Good Day to Die Hard.

== Early life and education ==
Moore was born in Dundalk, Ireland, and attended Rathmines College of Commerce, where he attained a degree in Media Arts. Upon completing his course, Moore genuinely believed that he wouldn't go on to work within the medium of film, but after a few years, that promptly changed.

== Career ==
After graduating, he wrote and directed a series of short films in Ireland. Several of these shorts have featured on Irish TV networks over the years, and along the way Moore founded an Irish-based production company called Clingfilms. He then went on to direct several commercials, including the launch advertisement for Dreamcast, which 20th Century Fox found so impressive they gave him the $17 million (BTL) budget for Behind Enemy Lines.

To date, Moore has made five films for 20th Century Fox: Behind Enemy Lines (2001), Flight of the Phoenix (2004), The Omen (2006), Max Payne (2008) and A Good Day to Die Hard (2013). Despite receiving mixed reviews, both Behind Enemy Lines and The Omen did well at the box office. Flight of the Phoenix, received mainly negative reviews and grossed just under $35 million worldwide, much less than the film's budget. The behind the scenes documentary on the DVD shows him at multiple points berating crew on set. Max Payne also received mainly negative reviews. A Good Day to Die Hard has also received mostly negative reviews, but grossed $304 million on a $92 million budget, making it his highest-grossing film.

In September 2008, Moore was involved in a dispute with the MPAA over the certification of his film Max Payne. The MPAA initially gave the film an R rating, which Moore argued against. The film was re-edited and the rating was a month later changed to PG-13, just before theatrical distribution.

Moore was also considered to direct X-Men: The Last Stand as well as Friday the 13th.

In 2007, Moore obtained the rights to direct an adaptation of The Book of Lost Things through his Point Road production company. The rights have since lapsed.

== Personal life ==
Moore's partner is Fiona Connon, a makeup artist whom he met through an industry friend early in his career in Ireland. They have one child, Buzz. The family reside in the US, and occasionally visit Ireland. In 2015, Moore expressed a desire to return home, but the nature of his work in Hollywood rendered it impractical.

Moore told the BBC in September 2004 that he firmly professes a belief in God. When asked if he was either religious or spiritual, Moore replied:

Ah, what's that line from the movie [Flight of the Phoenix]? "Religion divides people, spirituality brings them together." Well, I think religion is dangerous but essential, and it's undeniable. I think to divide spirituality and religion is an academic argument that just doesn't cut it in the real world."

In 2013, Moore opened up about his struggles with alcohol. He has been sober since 2008, following what he describes as an intense period of drinking upon finishing promotional duties for Max Payne.

== Critical evaluation ==
Despite his films receiving mixed or negative reviews from critics, for the most part Moore's films have proved popular with audiences. Critic Armond White, noted for his contrarian opinions, has described Moore as "a Peckinpah-esque, neo-Eisenstein stylist whose grade-B material (Behind Enemy Lines, Flight of the Phoenix, The Omen) has kept him from receiving the acclaim he deserves". In his review of Max Payne, White had stated that Moore "explores genuine, contemporary anxiety [and that] his images are richer than his plots".

Daniel M. Kimmel, writing for the New England Movies Weekly, found Moore's film A Good Day to Die Hard to be better than Live Free or Die Hard and stated that the car chase scene "is well worth the price of admission". With a 3.5/5 rating, Kimmel summed up his review saying, "it's probably a good day to end the series at last, but it's an action-packed and entertaining finale." Rick Groen of The Globe and Mail criticized the action scenes as being "messy", but concluded his review saying that the film "continues the franchise without undue embarrassment."

== Filmography ==
Short film

Year	Title	Director	Writer	Producer
1990	Jack's Bicycle	Yes	Yes	Yes
1995	He Shoots, He Scores	Yes	Yes	No

Feature film

Year	Title	Director	Producer
2001	Behind Enemy Lines	Yes	No
2004	Flight of the Phoenix	Yes	No
2006	The Omen	Yes	Yes
2008	Max Payne	Yes	Yes
2013	A Good Day to Die Hard	Yes	No
2016	The Siege of Jadotville	No	Executive
2016	I.T.	Yes	No

=== Unrealized projects ===
Title and Description	Ref.
Airborne, An action pic set on an aircraft carrier.	
All the Men in the Sea: The Untold Story of One of the Greatest Rescues in History, an adaption of the nonfiction book by Michael Krieger that tells the story of the divers and seamen of a cargo ship caught in the path of Hurricane Roxanne.	
Capricorn One, A remake of the 1977 film of the same name.	
Come Hell or High Water, Based on the experiences of Captain Ernest E. Evans during the Battle off Samar, Battle of Leyte Gulf.	
Fire and Water, story centers on international commandos who raid a Nazi outpost in Norway where the Third Reich is developing an atomic bomb.	
The Hunters, An adaptation of a novel by Chris Kuzneski.	
Ice Road Truckers, An action feature based on the reality show of the same name.	
Kidnap, A thriller that centers on a woman whose son is kidnapped at a local mall and she embarks on a chase to save him.	
The Last Mission, A story about a Vietnam-era Navy Seal who has to rescue his daughter when she's kidnapped in the Philippines.	
The Manuscript, Story centers on a jailed genius convict, who leads a book editor, through clues in his memoir, to the $20 million in missing diamonds he stole years earlier.	
Material Breach, A political thriller about a secret government group that brings in a man once accused of terrorist acts to help plan attacks on Washington.	
N.O.C., An action thriller about a deep-undercover CIA operative who discovers that a faction of the agency is collaborating with the terrorist cell he was sent to infiltrate.	
Northern Lights, set against the backdrop of extreme flying and follows four young pilots as they compete against the world’s best.	
Pilgrim aka The Englishman, An adaption of Will Scully's book "Once A Pilgrim: The True Story of One Man's Courage Under Rebel Fire".	
Plane, A suspense thriller about a traveling salesman, who finds himself airborne in a small plane when the pilot dies and must come to terms with his life while trying not to crash.	
Virulents, An adaptation of a comic book published by Virgin Comics, Story revolves around a ragtag group of soldiers who search for a lost patrol in Afghanistan and stumble into a nest of vampire zombies.	
Yeager, A biopic of aviation pioneer Chuck Yeager, from his roots in West Virginia through his WWII dogfights and his flight to break the sound barrier.	
