= Žganec =

Žganec is a surname. Notable people with the surname include:

- Karlo Žganec (born 1995), Croatian basketball player
- Vinko Žganec (1890–1976), Croatian ethnomusicologist
