= University times =

"University Times" may refer to:

- University Times, the faculty and staff newspaper of the University of Pittsburgh, Pittsburgh, Pennsylvania, USA.
- The University Times, the student newspaper of Trinity College, Dublin, Ireland.
