= Croatian Fraternal Union Building =

Building in Pittsburgh, Pennsylvania

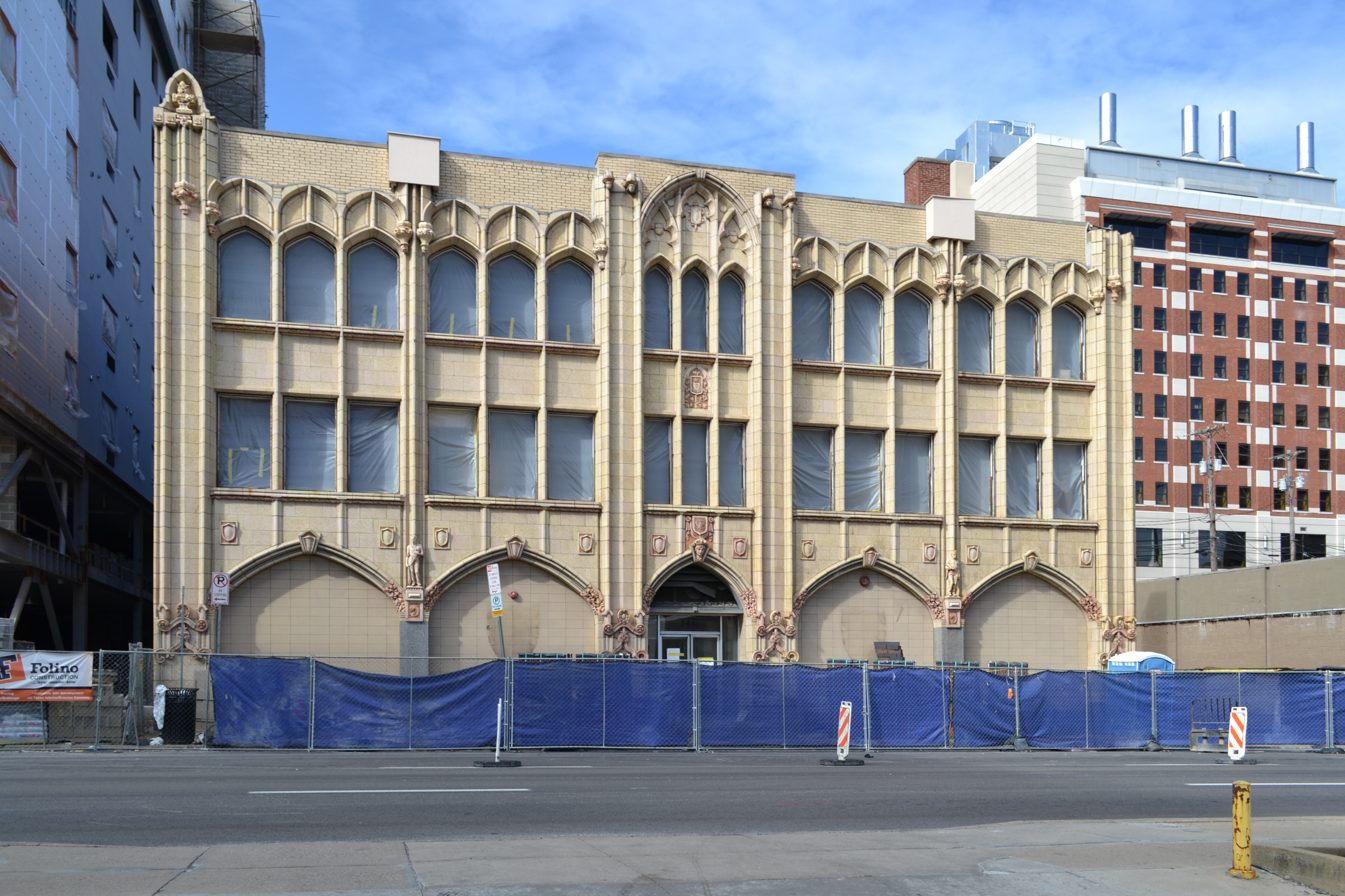
- The building in October 2018
- Interactive map of the Croatian Fraternal Union Building area

General information
- Location: 3441 Forbes Ave. Pittsburgh, Pennsylvania
- Coordinates: 40°26′22″N 79°57′37″W
- Construction started: 1928
- Completed: 1929
- Owner: University of Pittsburgh

Design and construction
- Architect: Pierre A. Liesch

The Croatian Fraternal Union Building was a historic building in the Oakland neighborhood of Pittsburgh, Pennsylvania. It was the former headquarters of the Croatian Fraternal Union, the oldest and largest Croatian organization in North America, and a significant site in Croatian American history. The building was designed by Pierre A. Liesch in the Flemish Gothic Revival style and built in 1928–9.

== History ==
The Croatian Fraternal Union (CFU) began as the Croatian Association, chartered in 1894 in Allegheny, now Pittsburgh's North Side. It was re-chartered in 1897 as the National Croatian Society and then merged with three other organizations in 1926 to form the CFU. The organization offered life, accident, and health insurance for its members, as well as social and cultural services including scholarships and sports programs. By 1928, it had over 80,000 members.

After the 1926 merger, the CFU needed a new headquarters to consolidate its operations. Both of its existing facilities—the old NCS building on the North Side, and the Chicago offices of the Croatian League of Illinois—were inadequate for the new, larger organization. Delegates to the first CFU convention in May 1926 decided to sell the old offices and build or buy a new one. In 1928, the organization commissioned a new Home Office building on Forbes Avenue in Oakland. The Pittsburgh Press reported that the "architecture of the building will be Gothic and leaning towards the Cathedral of Learning style, and will be in keeping with the cultural atmosphere of the Schenley district."

The building was dedicated on January 20, 1929, with a speech from Pittsburgh mayor Charles H. Kline. It was the first building designed specifically to meet the needs of the organization and included an auditorium and meeting hall as well as office space. In 1961, the CFU moved to a new headquarters in Wilkins Township and the Forbes Avenue building was sold to Allegheny County. It housed county Health Department facilities for many years.

The University of Pittsburgh bought the building in July 2018 for $1.9 million and filed for a demolition permit in August. In October, it was nominated as a city historic landmark by Preservation Pittsburgh. In July 2021, it was reported that Pitt intended to proceed with the demolition but had agreed to preserve and reuse the building's terra cotta facade. The historic nomination had been placed on hold while the university and preservation groups attempted to negotiate a solution. The building was demolished in 2022.

== Architecture ==
The CFU building was a three-story, flat-roofed structure of brick, steel, and concrete construction. It was designed by Luxembourg-born Pittsburgh architect Pierre A. Liesch (1872–1954) in a Flemish Gothic Revival style. Liesch was also credited as a consulting architect on the Union Trust Building (1916), which showed a similar Flemish influence. The principal facade faced southeast toward Forbes Avenue and was clad in gold terra cotta tile with rust-colored accents. The facade was symmetrical and was divided into five bays by vertically ribbed responds which ran the full height of the building. The first floor had an arcade of five pointed arches, with the central arch housing the entry doors. The side arches were originally plate-glass storefronts with their own individual entrances, but were later filled in with terra cotta blocks to form a blind arcade. The main entrance was also altered from the original carved wooden doors with stained-glass sidelights and transom to a more utilitarian aluminum-framed entrance.

The second and third stories had three windows per bay, separated by vertical ribbing. The third-floor windows had the form of Gothic pointed arches, while those on the second floor are rectangular. The parapet above the third-floor windows was ornamented with Gothic tracery including a large tripartite pointed arch above the entrance bay. The building was originally crowned with a highly ornate overhanging cornice and a pointed-arch apex topped with a sculptural element, but this had been replaced with a plain brick parapet. Truncated corbeled arches that supported the cornice were present. The responds were terminated with ornamented pinnacles, though only one was still present as of 2018. Other terra cotta ornamentation included seals of the United States and Pennsylvania, escutcheons, scrollwork, floral patterns, heraldic dolphins, a crowned head, and sculpted figures of a rope-maker and a miner, representing common occupations for Croatian immigrants.
