= The Pittsburgh Reporter =

American weekly newspaper

- A Progressive Community Newspaper
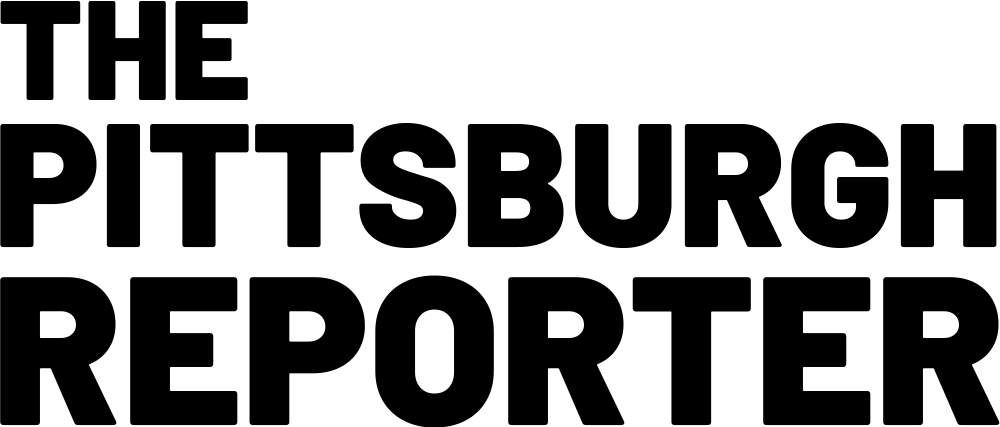

- Screenshot of The Pittsburgh Reporter (January 2024)
- Type: Daily online / weekly print newspaper (until 2022)
- Format: Broadsheet
- Owner: Foo Conner
- Founder: David Davies
- Editor-in-chief: Foo Conner (since 2023)
- Former Publishers: David Davies (1939-1947), Johnny Jones (1947-1967), Roberta Smith (1978-2000), Tom Smith (2000-2023)
- Founded: 1939; 86 years ago
- Language: English
- Headquarters: 1701 E Carson St, #201, Pittsburgh, Pennsylvania 15203
- City: Pittsburgh
- Country: United States
- Circulation: 12,000 print (before 2022)
- ISSN: 2994-4325 (print); 2994-4333 (web)
- OCLC number: 12178289
- Website: sopghreporter.com
- Free online archives: issuu.com/sopghreporter

The Pittsburgh Reporter is an American online newspaper based in Pittsburgh, Pennsylvania. Founded in 1939 as a weekly newspaper, it evolved into a daily online platform with a focusing on regional news and community issues.

The Reporter has been a key voice for Southern Pittsburgh neighborhoods. Its leadership saw a notable shift in the 1970s with Roberta Smith at the helm as publisher/editor, later succeeded by her son Tom Smith in 1999. In 2023, the publication underwent significant expansion when Foo Conner consolidated several papers under The Pittsburgh Reporter name.

== History ==
David Davies founded The Reporter in 1939. He previously worked at the Pittsburgh Dispatch in the 1920s and Allegheny County Government in the 1930s. The paper was first printed from his home. Johnny Jones joined him as the business manager and became publisher in 1947. The paper's mission was to be, "A Progressive Community Newspaper."

The Reporter initially covered local government, social events, and schools. After Jones died in 1967, his daughter ran it briefly. It was then sold to Typecraft Press. In the 1971, Roberta Smith joined as a freelancer. By 1978, she bought the paper for $1, renaming it The South Pittsburgh Reporter. It was still called The Reporter for short. Roberta Smith focused on community news and local leadership. She served on several non-profit boards and was the first female president of The Brashear Association. She retired in 2000, passing the paper to her son Tom Smith.

Tom Smith continued the paper's focus on community service. He moved the headquarters to Allentown and served as the longstanding board president of the Hilltop Alliance. By 2020, The Reporter covered Allentown, Arlington, Beltzhoover, Bon Air, Carrick, Knoxville, Mount Oliver, Mount Washington, Southside Flats, and South Side Slopes. The Reporter was distributed across 100 locations.

The Reporter started a digital edition in the 1990s. It stopped its print edition temporarily in 2022 during the COVID-19 pandemic.

In 2023, Foo Conner, a media entrepreneur, acquired The Reporter. Conner had run the Pittsburgh news outlet Jekko for over a decade. He merged other outlets into The Pittsburgh Reporter, marking the next chapter for the publication.
