= The Hunters (book series) =

Series of books by Chris Kuzneski

The Hunters is a book series written by Chris Kuzneski, an American author. The series follows the adventures of a team of renegades – an ex-military leader, a historian, a computer whiz, a weapons expert and a thief – financed by a billionaire philanthropist who are tasked with finding the world's most legendary treasures. The series also ties in with Kuzneski's other series, Payne & Jones, by featuring the character Petr Ulster, a historian and curator of the Ulster Archives in Küsendorf, Switzerland, and mentioning a number of minor characters and events from the Payne & Jones universe. The third book in the series, The Prisoner's Gold, won the Thriller Award for the 2016 Book of the Year at a gala hosted by the International Thriller Writers (ITW) in New York City on July 9, 2016.

== Books ==
The Hunters series follows the adventures of a team of renegades – an ex-military leader, an historian, a computer whiz, a weapons expert, and a thief – financed by a billionaire philanthropist. The team is tasked with finding the world's most legendary treasures.

== The Hunters movie ==
The rights to The Hunters were optioned in 2016; John Moore has signed on to direct The Hunters, and the screenplay is being written by Robert Kamen. On July 1, 2014, Reg Poerscout-Edgerton was announced as casting director for the film.

== Recurring Characters ==
- Jack Cobb is an ex-military commander, whose role is to lead the renegades on their missions across the globe. His experience, strength, and resilience is crucial to the mission, and the reason why he was chosen as the Hunters' leader.
- Sarah Ellis is a former CIA operative, focusing on the role of a thief for the Hunters.
- Hector Garcia is the team's computer genius. Socially inadequate, but unparalleled at his job, Hector is regarded as one of the best hackers in the world.
- Josh McNutt is a decorated US Marine sniper, focusing on being the Hunters' weapon and demolition expert.
- Jasmine Park has an exhaustive knowledge of ancient cultures and world religions, fluent in several languages, and is the team's historian. She is featured only in the first two books.
- Jean-Marc Papineau, a Frenchman with innumerable wealth at his disposal to fund the Hunter's activities and seemingly unlimited amount of resources and connections to help them in their quests.
- Petr Ulster, historian and curator of the Ulster Archives in Küsendorf, Switzerland.
- Maurice Copeland, a billionaire who is Papineau's boss and is the person behind their search.
