= Croatian tamburica =

Type of folk song

The flag of Croatia, and of the Croats (in the middle of the flag is the coat of arms of Croatia and of the Croats.

Croatian tamburitza (tam•bu•rit•za) is a folk instrument played with a tambura (cousins with Russian balalaika and the Italian mandolin) and is accompanied with a dance. The origin is most commonly thought to be introduced from the Turks by way of Bosnia between the 14th and 16th century. Although, others believe that the tambura was introduced by the Persians. It was not until the 19th century that tamburitza gained popularity during several nationalist movements against the Austro-Hungarian Empire. Many societies such as Croatian, Slovak and Czech, used national folk songs and dance as an "expression of their national identity". During this time, the first Croatian tamburitza ensemble was created by Pajo Kolarić in 1847. Also, during early 20th century ethnomusicologist Professor Vinko Žganec, began to write down Croatian folk songs which in the past were not written, but passed down from generation to generation.

The popularity of Croatian tamburitza continued to grow and even developed into professional working ensembles throughout the 19th century and into the 20th. Tamburitza became so popular that newsletters began to circulate Croatia and neighbouring countries that shared interest in the instrument. Then in 1941, the first radio station in Croatia (located in Zagreb) whose basis was tamburitza was created and named the Croatian Radio-Television Tamburitza Orchestra. Croatian Tamburitza continues to be popular in Croatia and in North America thanks to the Croatian Fraternal Union and Duquesne University.
