= Sign of the Cross (novel) =

2006 novel by Chris Kuzneski

- Author: Chris Kuzneski
- Language: English
- Genre: Thriller
- Publisher: Jove, Penguin UK
- Publication date: 2006 (US); 2007 (UK)
- Publication place: United States
- ISBN: 978-0-515-14211-2
- Preceded by: The Plantation
- Followed by: Sword of God

Sign of the Cross is the second novel by New York Times bestselling author Chris Kuzneski. First published in October 2006 by Penguin Group (USA), the religious thriller followed the exploits of Jonathon Payne and David Jones, who have been featured in all of Kuzneski's thrillers. It also introduced the character of Nick Dial, who has appeared in every Kuzneski novel since.

The book was endorsed by several notable authors, including Clive Cussler, Nelson DeMille, Steve Berry, James Rollins, and Tess Gerritsen.

Penguin UK released the British version in April 2007, and the book climbed to #11 on the British bestseller list. The foreign rights to Sign of the Cross have sold in more than fifteen languages.

== Plot summary ==
Jonathon Payne and David "D.J." Jones are recruited to find Dr. Charles Boyd, an archeologist who recently found the Catacombs of Orvieto, the safe haven for the popes of the Middle Ages. While Boyd avoids pursuit, a series of victims turn up dead, people who were tortured and crucified like Jesus Christ on his final day. All the incidents are interconnected, but it’s up to Payne and Jones to figure out the common thread and why they were selected to solve the puzzle.

== Book reviews ==
From Publishers Weekly — "Kuzneski knows what fans of the genre want: compelling and well-researched history, high-tech 21st-century sleuthing, and a lot of action."

From Crime Squad (United Kingdom) — "In Sign of the Cross, Chris Kuzneski has created an entirely original world-view and tells us an extraordinary tale with one hell of a sting to it. He writes like a dream and his thriller style is nigh on flawless. Indeed, the author has created a page-turning style that older thriller pros would give up serious appendages to perfect."

From Clive Cussler — "Harrowing, but always suspenseful, Sign of the Cross makes you wish it would never end."

From Nelson DeMille — "Chris Kuzneski is a remarkable new writer, who completely understands what makes for a good story: action, sex, suspense, humor, and great characters."
