= The Plantation =

2000 novel by Chris Kuzneski

- First edition
- Author: Chris Kuzneski
- Language: English
- Genre: Thriller
- Publisher: Iuniverse Inc (2000), Berkley Books (2009)
- Publication place: United States
- ISBN: 0-9715743-0-8
- OCLC: 50762212
- Followed by: Sign of the Cross

The Plantation is the first novel by Chris Kuzneski. First published in 2000, it introduced the characters Jonathon Payne and David Jones, who have been featured in all of Kuzneski's thrillers. The book was endorsed by several notable authors, including James Patterson, Nelson DeMille, Lee Child, and James Rollins.

Berkley Books released an updated version of The Plantation in July 2009, featuring several new scenes.

== Recurring characters ==
Jonathon Payne, a retired Special Forces officer and former commander of the MANIACs. Payne is CEO of Payne Industries, a hi-tech company. He was introduced in The Plantation and has appeared in every Kuzneski novel.

David (D.J.) Jones, Payne’s former second in command with the MANIACs. Best friends with Payne, he operates a detective agency out of the Payne Industries building in Pittsburgh, Pennsylvania. Jones was introduced in The Plantation and has appeared in every Kuzneski novel.

MANIACs, an elite Special Forces team composed of the best soldiers in the United States military. The term MANIACs is an acronym for Marines Army Navy Intelligence Air Force and Coast Guard.
