= Murray Chass =

American baseball blogger (born 1938)

- Born: October 12, 1938 (age 87); Pittsburgh, Pennsylvania, U.S.
- Occupation: Sportswriter
- Employer(s): The New York Times, The Associated Press
- Awards: J. G. Taylor Spink Award

Murray Chass (born October 12, 1938) is an American baseball sportswriter and blogger. He wrote for The New York Times and before that the Associated Press on baseball and sports legal and labor relations. In 2003 the Baseball Writers' Association of America honored him with the J. G. Taylor Spink Award.

== Early life and career ==
Chass graduated from the University of Pittsburgh in 1960 with a bachelor's degree in political science where he was a writer and editor for the Pitt News. In 1956, he "audaciously" made an appointment with the editor of the Pittsburgh Post-Gazette to pursue his "future of a newspaperman." He joined the Baseball Writers' Association of America in 1962, when he worked for the Associated Press in Pittsburgh. He joined the New York Times in 1969, and started covering the New York Yankees the following year. In 1986, he was made the paper's national baseball writer.

== Career ==
From 1979–1980 he served as chairman of the New York chapter of the Baseball Writers' Association of America. Chass has authored numerous books on the business, labor and legal relations of sports, baseball in particular, among his works: The Yankees: The Four Fabulous Eras of Baseball's Most Famous Team, which was published by Random House in 1979; Power Football, published by Dutton in 1973, and Pittsburgh Steelers: The Long Climb, published by Prentice Hall in 1973. He has contributed to Great Pro Football Games and Greatest Basketball Games. He also authored several articles in Dutton's Best Sports Stories series.

During his nearly 40 years writing for The New York Times, Chass covered the entirety of the George Steinbrenner regime, covering the Yankees daily until the end of the 1986 season.

Chass made some other significant contributions to baseball writing, including pioneering covering contracts of baseball's free agents once free agency began in 1976. He also pioneered the intensive coverage of baseball labor negotiations, later covering labor matters in the other three major sports as well.

Chass was one of the early authors of a Sunday baseball notebook and was unique in writing the notebook throughout the year, not just during the baseball season. From August 1984, through March 2008 he wrote 1,155 Sunday notebooks, developing more than 4,000 items ranging in length from one paragraph to more than 1,000 words.

In January 2004, he switched from reporting baseball news to writing baseball columns, writing from two to five columns a week.

Chass is a noted baseball traditionalist who laments the shift in baseball news coverage from daily beat-report biographies to more statistics-driven analysis like sabermetrics. In 2007, Chass asserted that, among "certain topics that should be off-limits," are "statistics mongers promoting VORP and other new-age baseball statistics." Chass particularly believes that in "their attempt to introduce these new-age statistics into the game," these "statistics mongers" threaten "to undermine most fans' enjoyment of baseball and the human factor therein." Baseball Prospectus editor Nate Silver published an open letter responding to Chass' comments.

He took a buyout from the Times, along with Supreme Court writer Linda Greenhouse and dozens of others, in April 2008; that same year Chass started a blog, "Murray Chass on Baseball," where he has written hundreds of columns. It was last updated in 2020.

Chass is a voter for the National Baseball Hall of Fame.

== Awards and honors ==
Chass was inducted into the National Baseball Hall of Fame after winning the BBWAA Career Excellence Award in 2003. Chass was inducted into the International Jewish Sports Hall of Fame in 2012 and the Jewish Sports Hall of Fame of Western Pennsylvania in 2003.

== Personal life ==
Chass married Ellen Rotberg Kraemer on September 30, 1975.
