= Pajo Kolarić =

Croatian composer

Pajo Kolarić (1821–1876) was an early Croatian composer for tamburitza. Kolarić formed the first amateur tamburitza orchestra in Osijek in 1847. He was a teacher of Mijo Majer.

== Sources ==
- Miholić, Irena (2004). "Priča o tamburi". Hrvatski iseljenički zbornik. Croatian Heritage Foundation. Archived from the original on 3 May 2007.
- Miholić, Irena (2009). "KOLARIĆ, Pajo (Kolarich, Kollarich; Pavao, Paulus)". Croatian Biographical Lexicon. Miroslav Krleža Lexicographical Institute.
