= Randyland =

Art museum in Pittsburgh, Pennsylvania

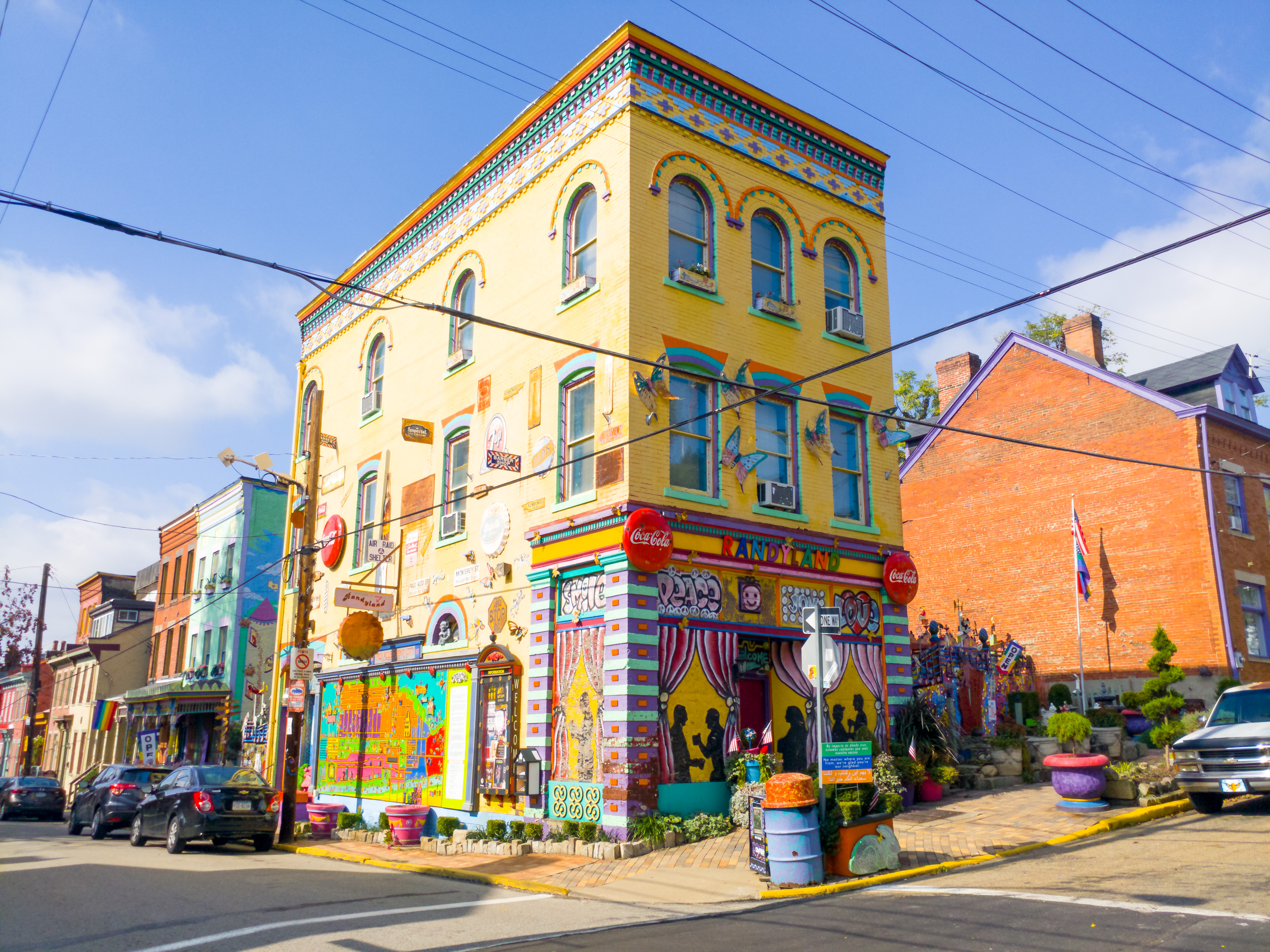

- Location of Randyland in Pittsburgh
- Established: 1995
- Location: 1501 Arch Street; Pittsburgh, Pennsylvania 15212
- Coordinates: 40°27′29″N 80°00′35″W
- Visitors: 200,000+ (2019)
- Founder: Randy Gilson
- Parking: Street

Randyland is an art museum in the North Side section of Pittsburgh, Pennsylvania. It is widely regarded as one of America's most colorful public art landmarks. Randy Gilson is the founder of this museum, which showcases found object art.

Randyland has played an important role in the cultural rejuvenation of Pittsburgh, with its neighbors City of Asylum and Mattress Factory. Randyland has received international attention through viral listicles, and is among the most photographed places on Instagram in Pittsburgh.

== History ==
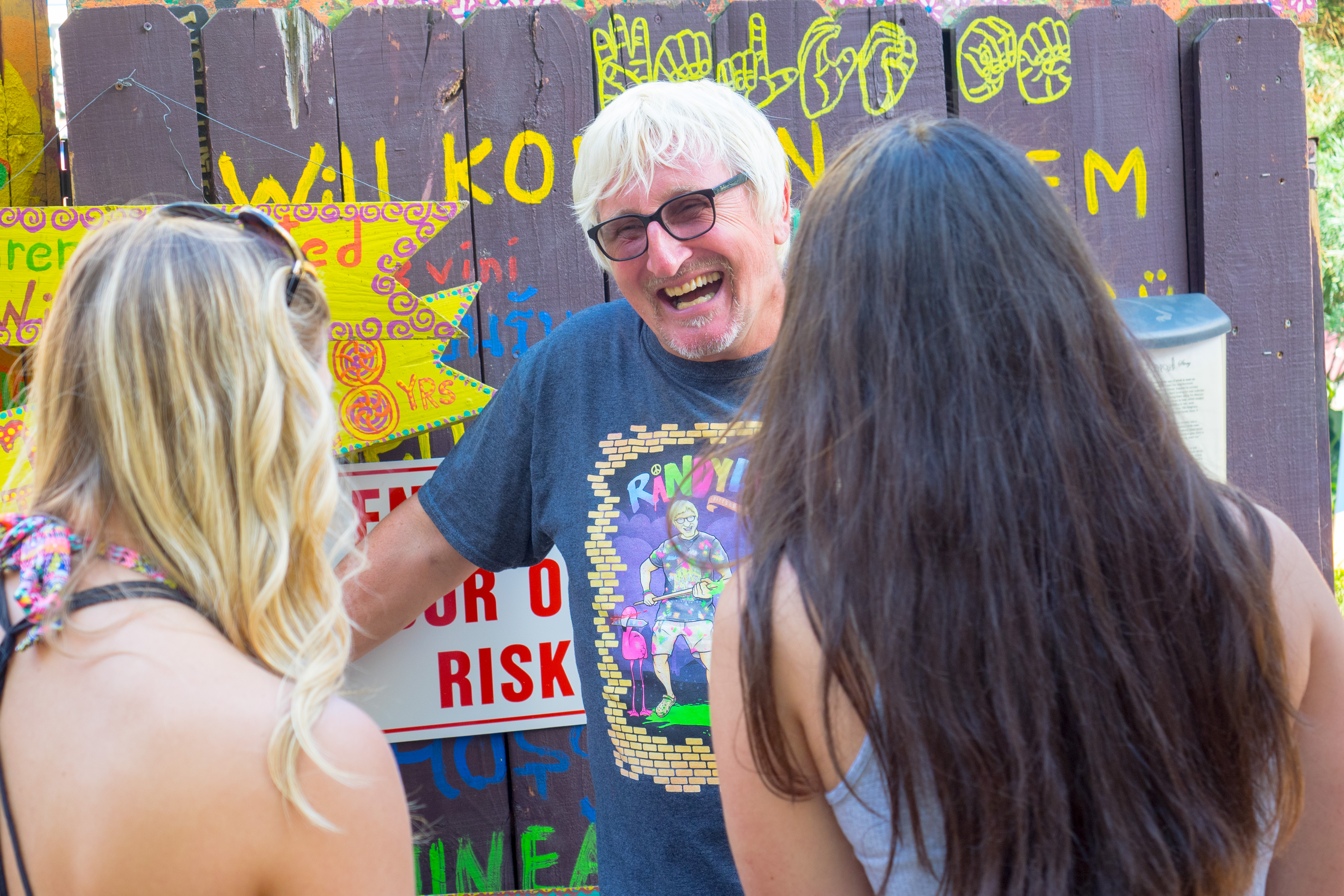
Randy Gilson talking to visitors at Randyland

Randy Gilson was born in Homestead, Pennsylvania. Early in life he suffered from homelessness and poverty. He moved to Pittsburgh's Northside in 1982, where he was a community activist, planting over 800 street gardens and 50 vegetable gardens. His guerrilla gardening planted vacant lots in Manchester, the Mexican War Streets, and surrounding neighborhoods.

He bought the property that would become Randyland on a credit card for $10,000 in 1995. Using upcycling, Gilson decorates his home with items such as mannequins, plastic dinosaurs and pink flamingos. The fences display murals with neighbors dancing and smiling. For the next three decades, he continued to work on the property, supporting himself and his artwork by working as a waiter.

In late 2016, Gilson's partner David Paul Francis "Mac" McDermott was diagnosed with terminal prostate cancer. Upon hearing the news, Randyland fans raised over $20,000 and sent Gilson and McDermott on their first vacation. The couple visited the Grand Canyon and Hollywood. Afterwards, Gilson retired from his restaurant job to spend more time with the ailing McDermott. Following the announcement, Foo Conner joined Randyland as co-director.

The neighborhood around the museum experienced explosive growth in 2016-2019. Randyland itself reportedly doubled in attendance. The courtyard was overhauled to accommodate the traffic. Under Conner's curation, the facility embraced being a selfie museum as a vibrant backdrop for photos.

McDermott died on January 10, 2019. As Gilson's partner, he was posthumously given the title of co-founder. Journalists noted that McDermott may have downplayed his role when alive but was a backbone of the museum. Later that year, Randyland received the Mayor's Award for Public Art for 2019. Conner left the museum early 2020.

Because it is outdoors, Randyland was one of the only art museums open in Pennsylvania during the COVID-19 pandemic. Gilson came out of retirement. The Courtyard was changed to a socially distanced playground throughout quarantine. Many of the original murals have been painted over.

As of 2022, Randyland is still a free and popular tourist attraction.

== Exhibits ==
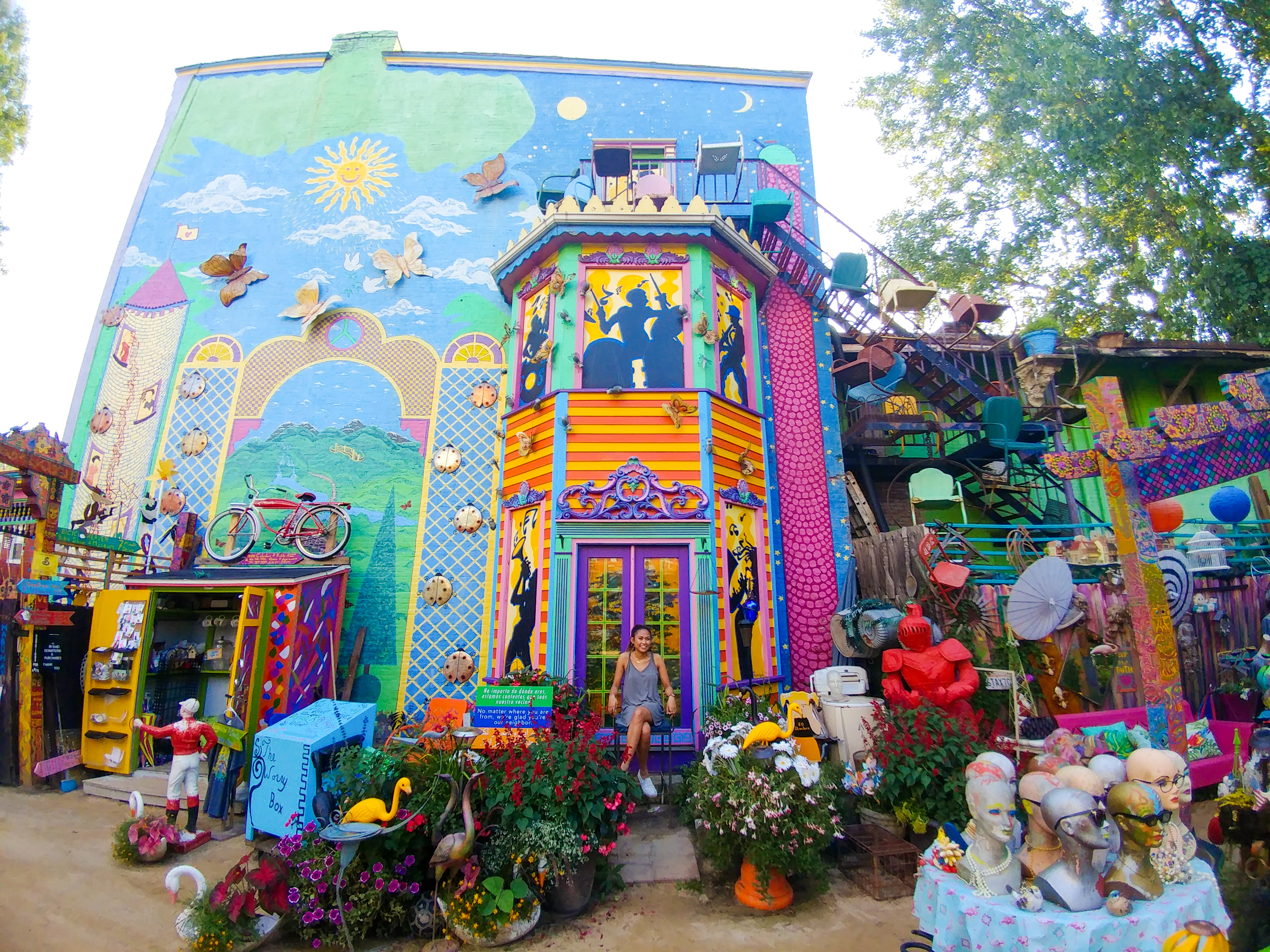
The Courtyard of Randyland

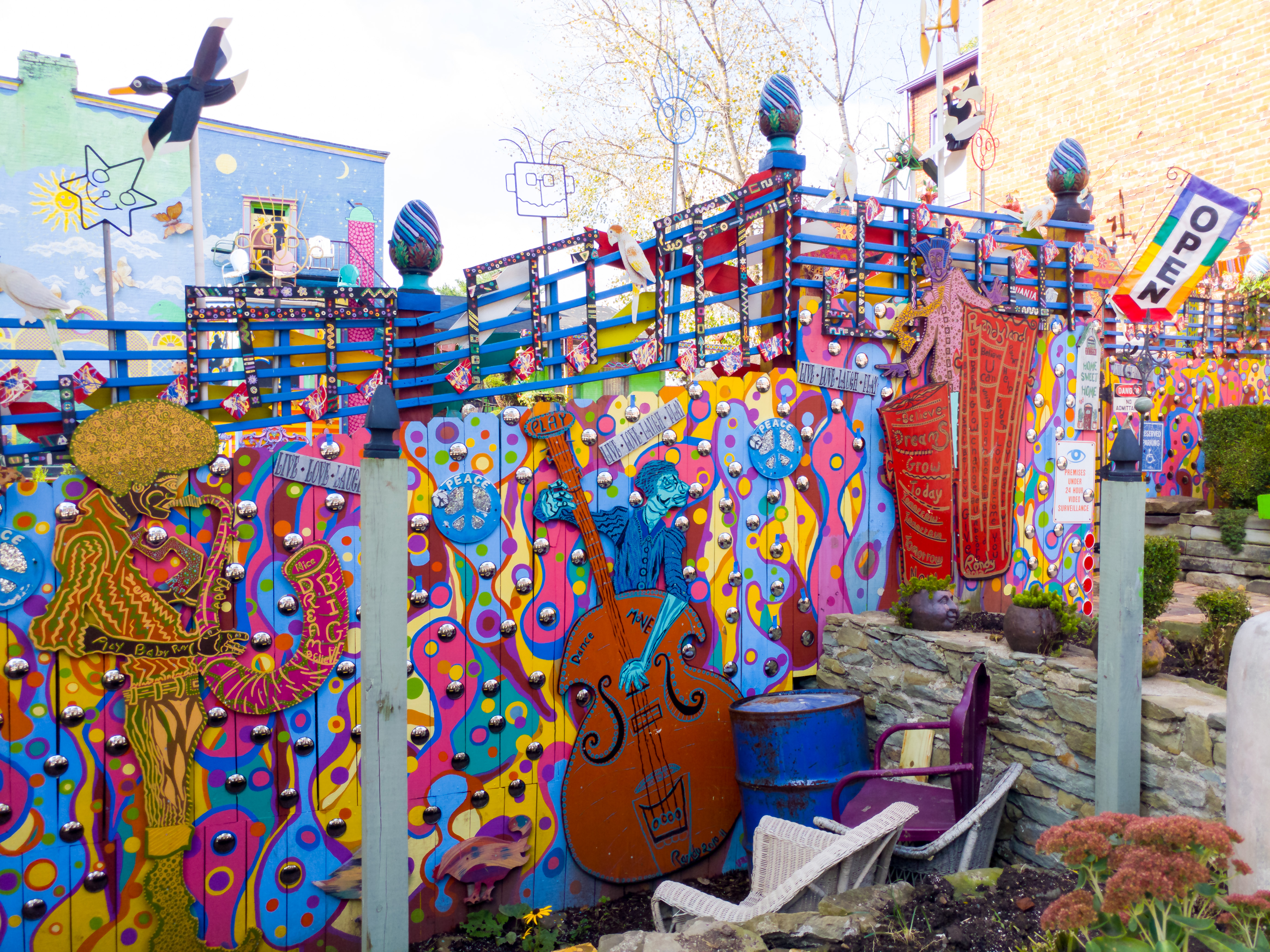
Outside Celebration Mural

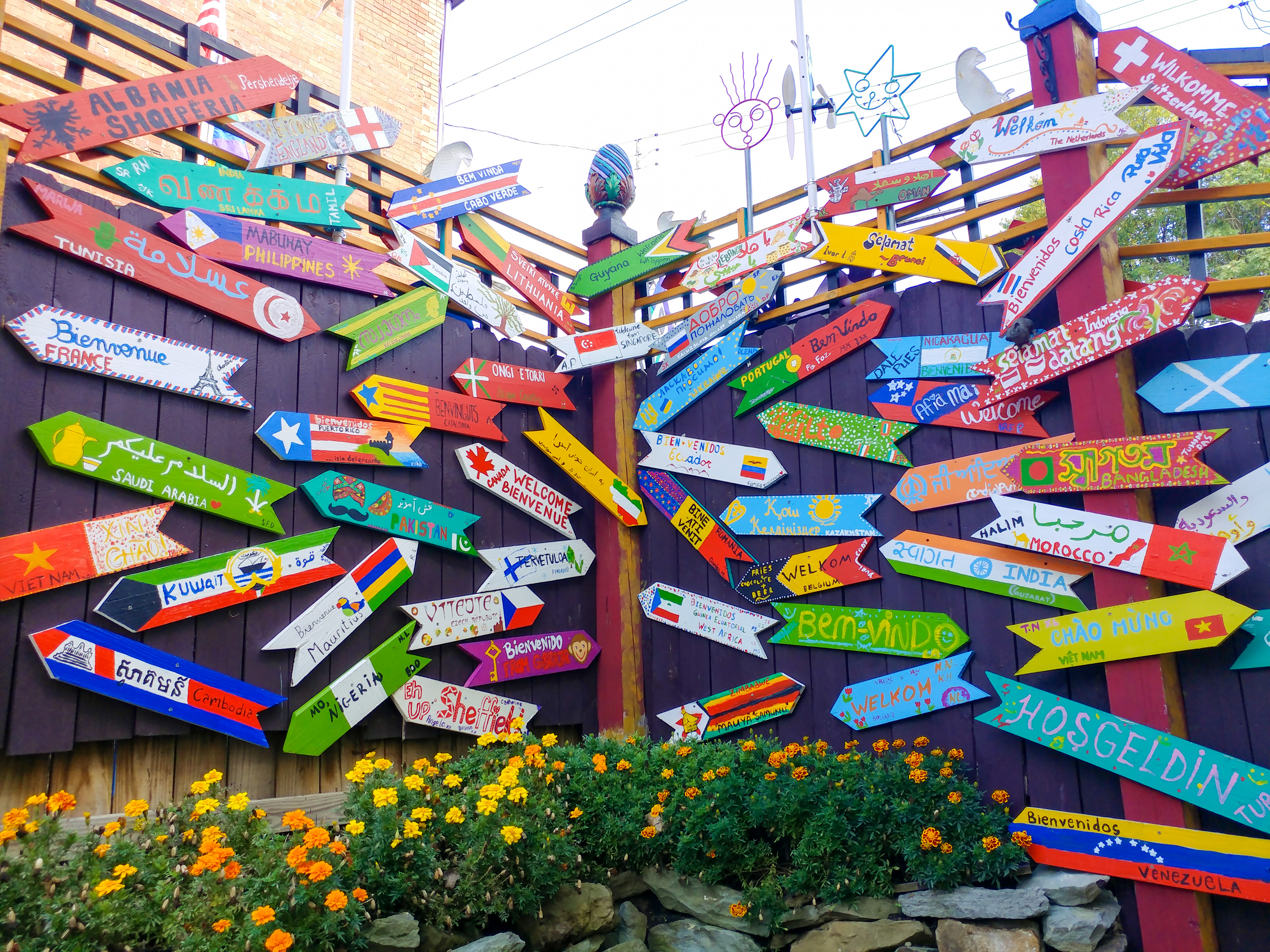
Randyland Welcome Wall

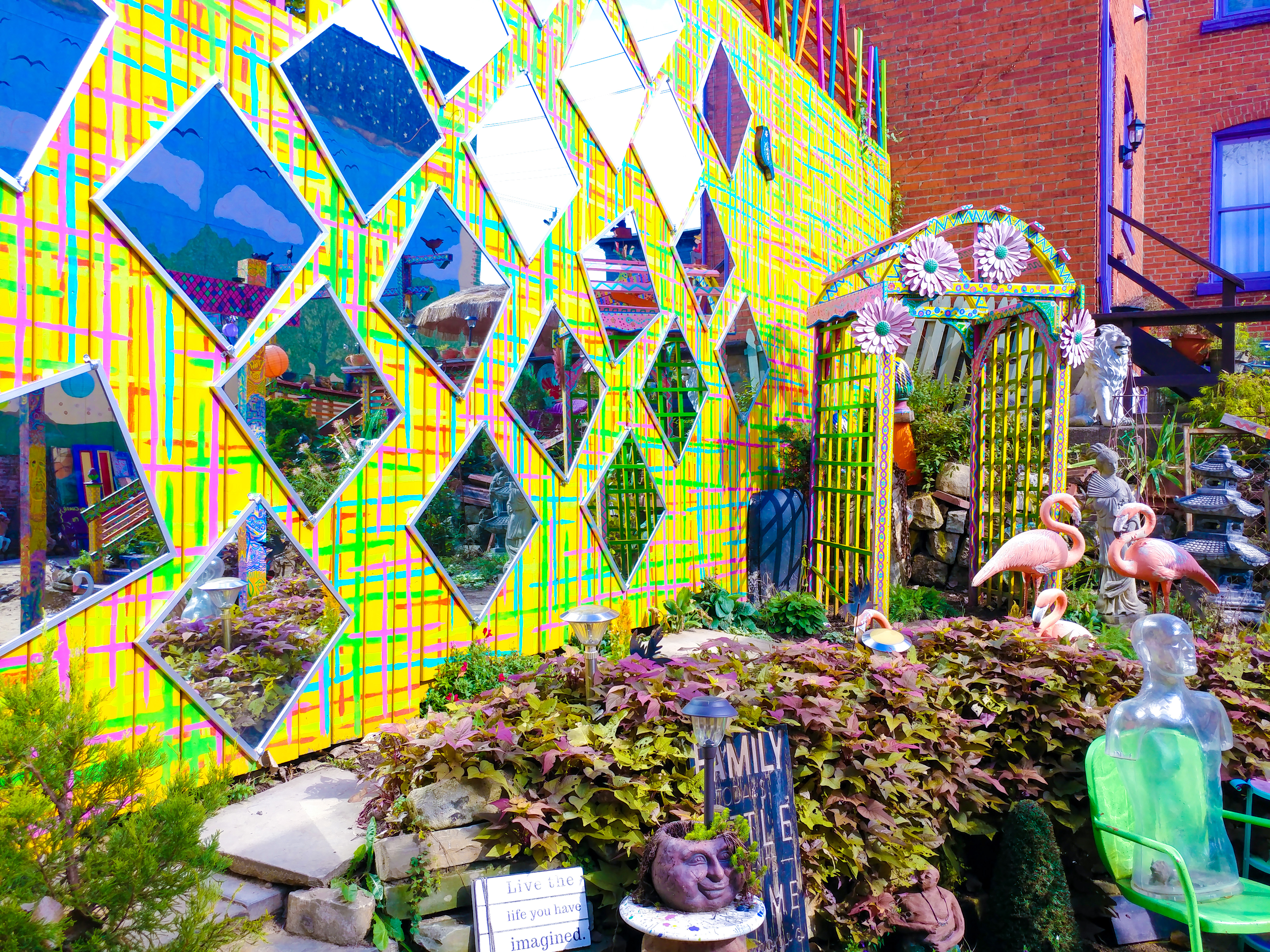
Randyland Mirror Wall

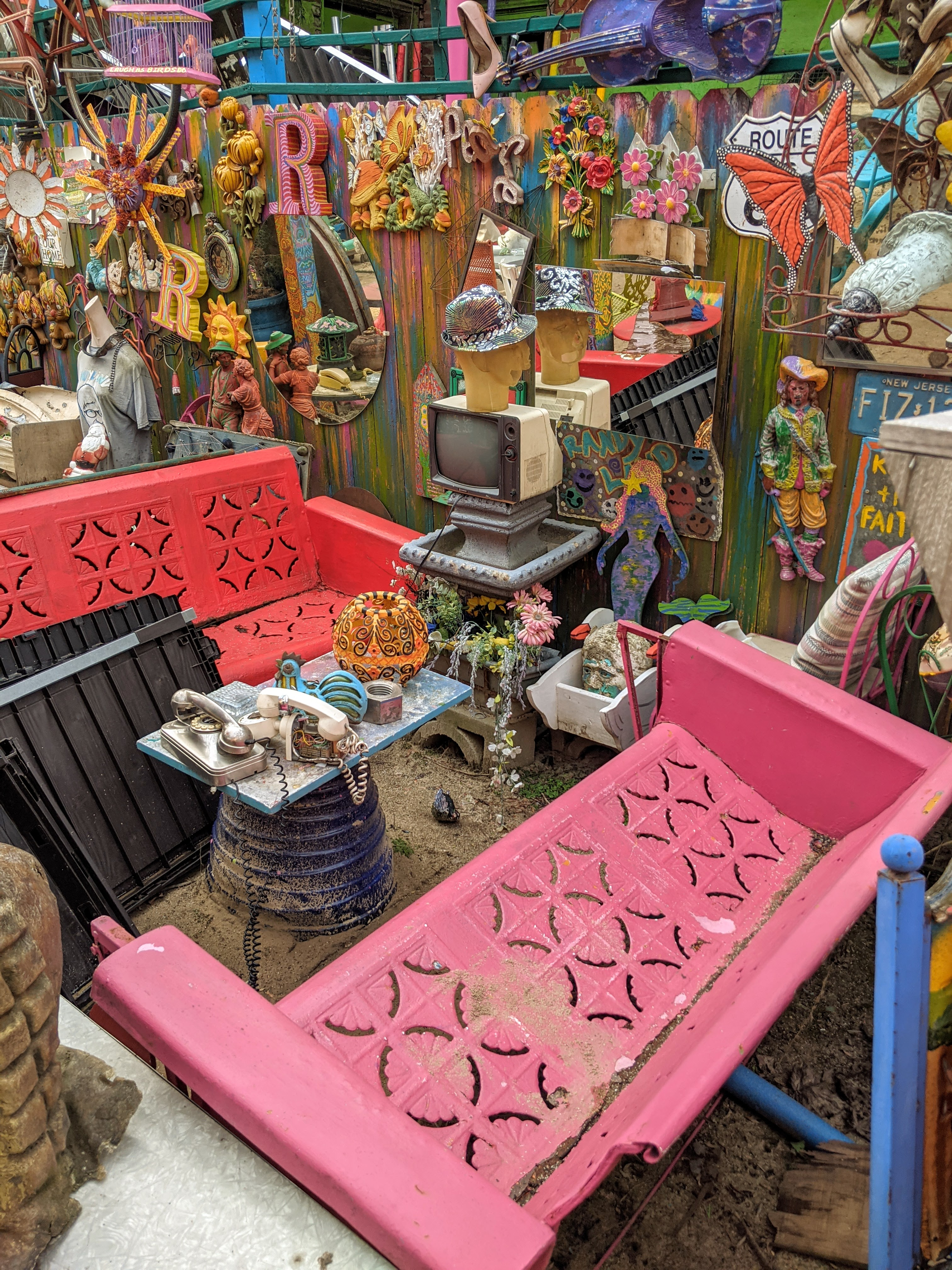
Outdoor Living Room

== In popular culture ==
- The 1988 documentary The Spirit of Pittsburgh features Randy Gilson's gardening alongside Fred Rogers.
- The documentary Pursuing Happiness features Randy Gilson as one of the happiest people in America.
- When a blizzard postponed Guster's Pittsburgh concert, they instead recorded a viral music video in the alleyway near Randyland.
- Randy Gilson succeeded Rick Sebak as the Mardi Gras King of Pittsburgh.
- A teenager's "Summer Bucket List 2017", which included Randyland as a place to visit, went viral.
- Anthony Bourdain: Parts Unknown calls Randyland an essential for the "Perfect Day in Pittsburgh".
- The popular travel show Rediscovering America presented by Barstool Sports interviewed Randy Gilson at Randyland in their 2022 episode about Pittsburgh.

== Awards ==
- Mayor's Award for Public Art 2019
