= Croatian Fraternal Union =

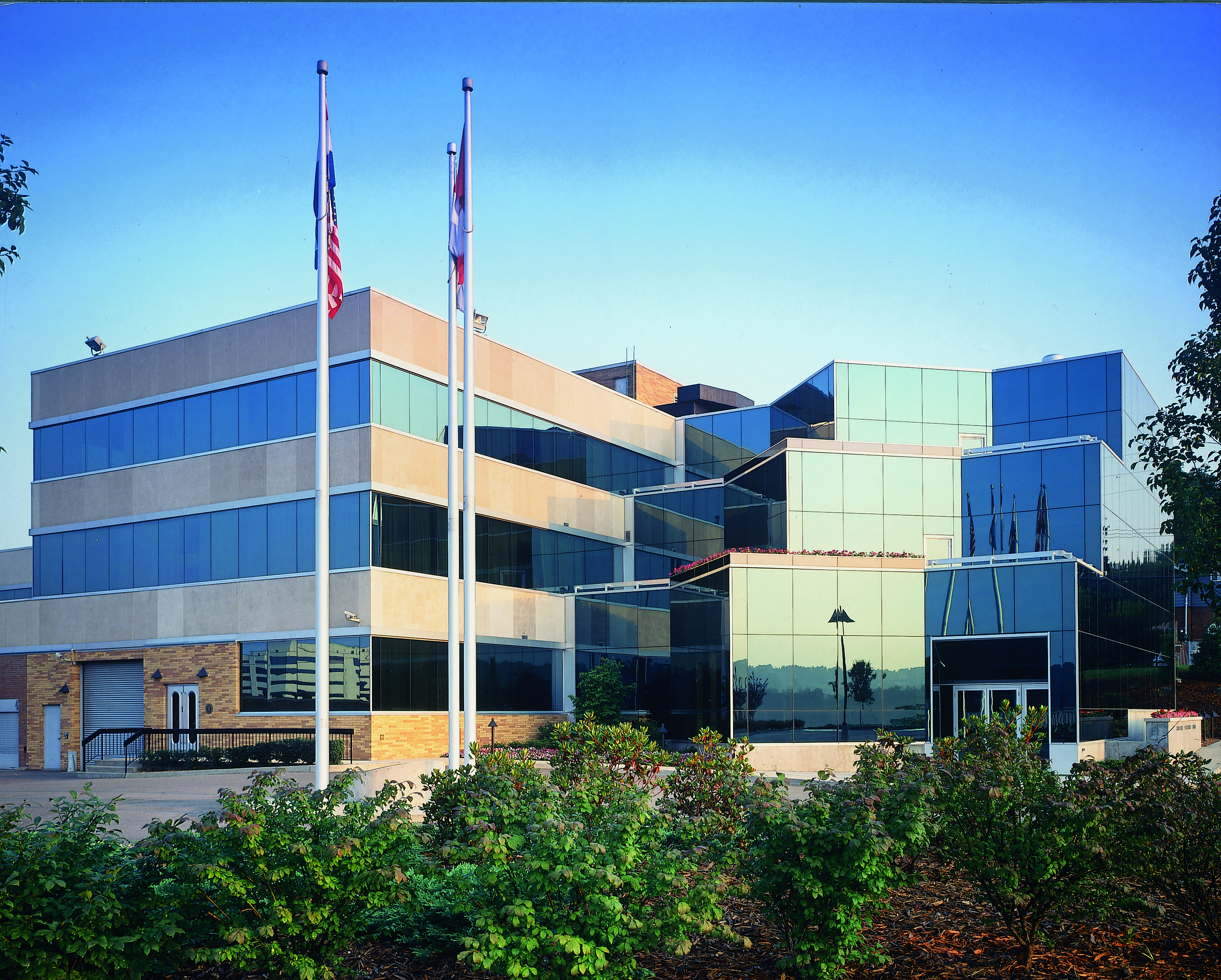
- The CFU building in the eastern suburbs of Pittsburgh
- Abbreviation: CFU
- Formation: 1894
- Type: Fraternal benefit society
- Legal status: Active
- Purpose: To support and preserve Croatian culture in North America
- Headquarters: Pittsburgh, Pennsylvania, United States
- Region served: North America
- Official language: English, Croatian
- National President: Edward W. Pazo
- Website: cfu.org

The Croatian Fraternal Union (CFU; Croatian: Hrvatska bratska zajednica, HBZ), the oldest and largest Croatian organization in North America, is a fraternal benefit society of the Croatian diaspora based out of Pittsburgh, Pennsylvania, US.

== History and activities ==
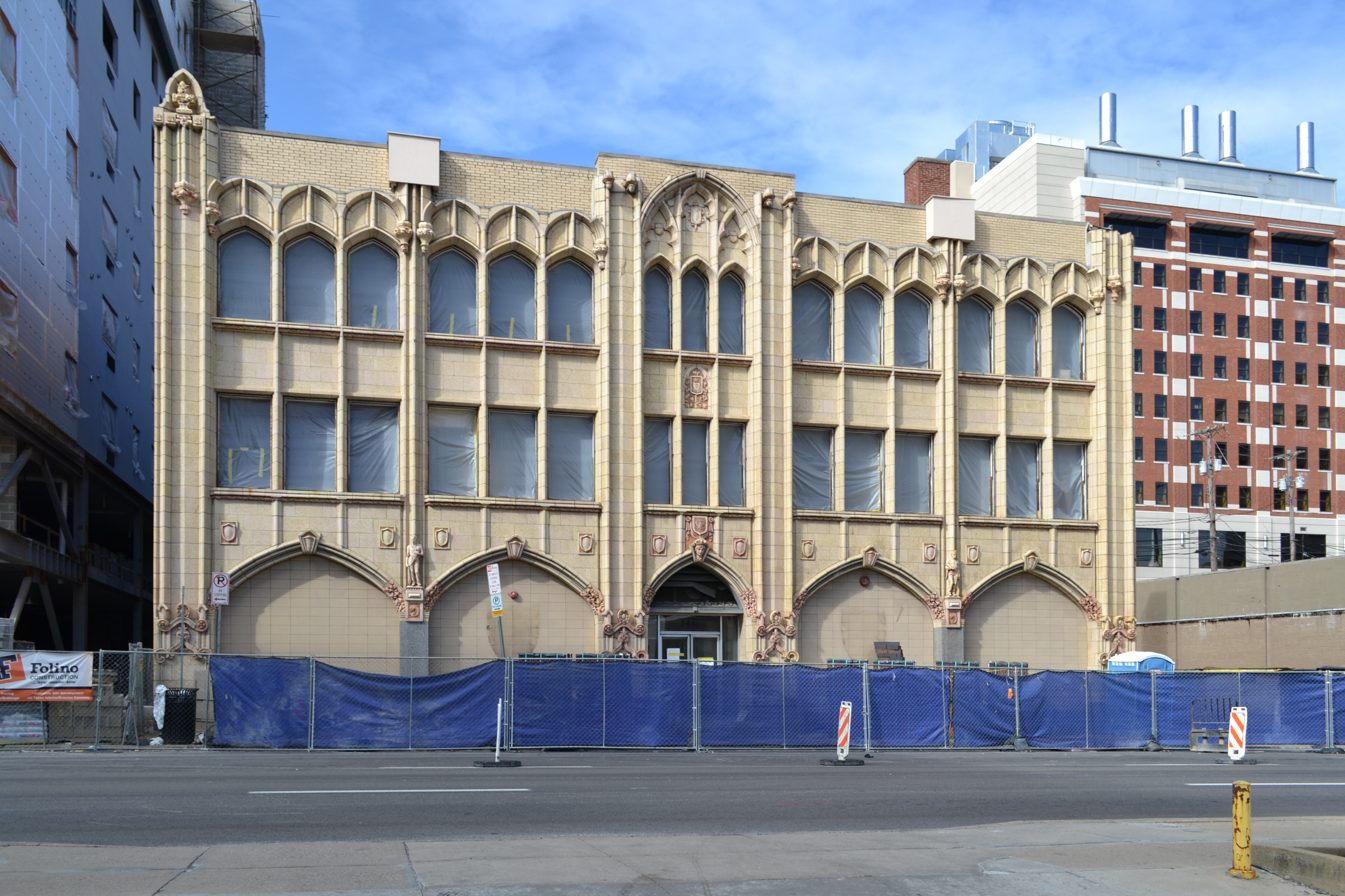
The former CFU building in Oakland, Pittsburgh

In the late fall of 1893, Croatian American journalist Zdravko V. Mužina issued a call for a convention to organize a fraternal benefit society for Americans of Croatian descent. Three hundred people met in response to the call on January 14, 1894, in Allegheny City, Pennsylvania. Only a handful of people signed up and paid dues to the new group. Mužina arranged for another meeting on September 2, 1894, which merged six Croatian societies into a new group, the Croatian Federation. This group changed its name to the National Croatian Society in 1897. In 1926, the National Croatian Society merged with the Croatian League of Illinois of Chicago, St. Joseph Society of Kansas City, Kansas, and the New Croatian Society of Whiting, Indiana, to form the Croatian Fraternal Union. In 1939, the CFU absorbed the Slovanic Croatian Union.

The CFU built a new Home Office building in the Oakland neighborhood of Pittsburgh in 1928–29. The building featured ornate Flemish Gothic terra cotta ornamentation and was nominated as a Pittsburgh historic landmark in 2018. In 1961, the organization moved to a new headquarters in Wilkins Township.

A street in Zagreb, the capital of Croatia, is called Street of the Croatian Fraternal Union. The National and University Library in Zagreb, one of Croatia's central cultural institutions, is located in that street. Josip Marohnić, founding father and first president of the CFU, also has a street named in his honor in Zagreb.

== Benefits and activities ==
The CFU offers a wide variety of insurance plans. However, it has been an important group in preserving Croatian culture in North America by supporting Croatian roots and traditional tamburitza groups. The Zajedničar, the CFU's newspaper, has been in circulation since 1904 and provides insurance information, as well as providing details about CFU cultural events from around the continent. The "Z", as it is called, began as a monthly and became a biweekly in 1909.

== Membership ==
Membership is open to anyone interested. Juvenile memberships are also available.

In the late 1960s, the CFU had 110,000 members. This declined to 100,000 members in 1979. That year, the CFU had 1,000 lodges in twenty-six states and several Canadian provinces. The CFU had 90,000 members in 1988.

== Current officers ==
=== National board ===
National president	Edward W. Pazo
Vice president/member services	Franjo Bertovic
National secretary/treasurer	Bernadette Luketich-Sikaras
Second vice president	Michael Ricci
President, board of trustees	Daniel Kochis
Secretary, board of trustees	Ruth Sepich
Member, board of trustees	Robert Luketic
	John Miksich
	John Staresinic Jr.
	Edward Sambol
	Wayne Vlasic
National president emeritus	Bernard M. Luketich

=== High Trial Board ===
President	Emil Boljkovac
Secretary	Stan Blaz
	Timothy Komara
	Robert D. Keber
	Steven Rukavina
	Mate Krpan
	Nikola Bilandzich

=== Junior Cultural Federation ===
President	Mike Ricci
1st Vice-President	Ted Sebetich Jr.
2nd Vice President	Natalie Kosta
Secretary	Robert Keber Jr.
Treasurer	Linda Spudic
Trustees	Michelle Janicki
	Timothy Komera
	Rudy Pesut
	Joe Grman
	Michael Vucinic
	Janet Craig
Board of Advisors	Donald Weakley
	Emil Ricio
	Derek Hohn
	Ivan Begg
	Virginia Michtich
Ex-Officio Advisor	Edward W. Pazo

== Lodges ==
=== United States ===
Arizona	978 – Phoenix	1002 – Tucson						
California	121 – Oakland	177 – Los Angeles	352 – Watsonville	434 – Sacramento	581 – Fresno	588 – San Pedro	612 – San Jose	619 – Roseville
	641 – San Diego	677 – Los Angeles	730 – Dinuba	900 – San Francisco	929 – Mountain View	959 – Fontana	1007 – San Francisco	1983 – Sunnyvale
	1987 – San Pedro	1989 – Sunnyvale	1991 – San Mateo	1993 – Los Angeles				
Colorado	12 – Denver	402 – Pueblo						
Connecticut	616 – Stamford							
District of Columbia	1976 – Washington	1984 – Washington						
Florida	982 – Miami							
Georgia	1014 – Atlanta							
Idaho	693 – Boise							
Illinois	9 – Chicago	18 – Joliet	32 – Chicago	75 – Waukegan	175 – Joliet	201 – Dunfermline	202 – Chicago	217 – Benld
	222 – Madison	229 – Chicago	367 – Canton	440 – Chicago	848 – Chicago	948 – Chicago	3055 – Chicago	
Indiana	57 – Whiting	154 – Chicago	170 – Merrillville	805 – Whiting				
Iowa	64 – Des Moines							
Kansas	35 – Kansas City							
Maryland	684 – Baltimore							
Michigan	69 – Caspian	259 – Hermansville	270 – Ahmeek	335 – Escanaba	351 – Detroit	533 – Battle Creek	561 – Flint	656 – Kipling
	717 – Detroit	1015 – Grand Rapids						
Minnesota	94 – Eveleth	238 – Gilbert	316 – St. Paul	355 – Ely	513 – Keewatin	550 – New Duluth	635 – Virginia	664 – Nebish
Missouri	50 – St. Louis							
Montana	84 – Anaconda	987 – Lewistown						
Nebraska	101 – Omaha							
Nevada	428 – McGill	1985 – Las Vegas						
New Jersey	362 – Hoboken	760 – Camden						
New Mexico	60 – Gallup							
New York	243 – Cementon	326 – Astoria	557 – Buffalo	789 – New York City	1981 – Astoria	1990 – New York City		
Ohio	47 – Cleveland	66 – Youngstown	136 – Lorain	182 – Warren	185 – Campbell	235 – Cleveland	310 – Columbus	337 – Euclid
	403 – Cleveland	472 – Akron	514 – Canton	563 – Dayton	570 – Brewster	598 – McDonald	600 – Massillon	614 – Newton Falls
	699 – Akron	859 – Cleveland	995 – Cleveland					
Oregon	130 – Portland							
Pennsylvania	1 – Pittsburgh	3 – McKeesport	4 – Etna	5 – Johnstown	6 – Rankin	10 – Export	13 – Steelton	19 – Pittsburgh
	34 – Pittsburgh	72 – Uniontown	79 – Dysart	80 – Smoke Run	85 – Rochester	126 – Farrell	141 – Pittsburgh	146 – Versailles
	194 – Monessen	234 – Pittsburgh	248 – Clairton	274 – Homer City	279 – Whitney	304 – Ambridge	307 – W. Brownsville	309 – Bessemer
	314 – Steelton	320 – Duquesne	327 – Donora	345 – Greensburg	354 – Cokeburg	423 – Aliquippa	432 – Yukon	508 – Greenville
	522 – West Pittsburg	528 – Republic	535 – Midland	540 – Conway	541 – Trafford	567 – Canonsburg	576 – Bethlehem	592 – Simpson
	602 – Verona	669 – Coraopolis	716 – Tire Hill	718 – Rankin	720 – Aliquippa	740 – Rices Landing	776 – Monaca	992 – Fairless Hills
Texas	1836 – Houston							
Utah	282 – Helper							
Washington	56 – Roslyn	246 – Tacoma	271 – Aberdeen	439 – Seattle	488 – Spokane	695 – Gig Harbor	867 – ESL Tacoma	1012 – Anacortes
West Virginia	2 – Benwood	523 – Warwood	595 – Weirton	606 – Bluefield				
Wisconsin	392 – West Allis	599 – Sanborn	639 – Eagle River	680 – Ashland	692 – Kenosha	993 – Mukwonago	1959 – Milwaukee	1994 – Milwaukee
	1995 – Sheboygan							
Wyoming	306 – Rock Springs	374 – Rock Springs						

=== Canada ===
Alberta	503 – Calgary	520 – Edmonton	949 – Alberta					
British Columbia	268 – Nanaimo	787 – Vancouver						
Nova Scotia	786 – Stellarton	796 – Glace Bay						
Ontario	500 – Cambridge	501 – Ottawa	512 – Mississauga	515 – Toronto	525 – Mississauga	530 – St. Thomas	531 – Simcoe	545 – Etobicoke
	617 – Welland	638 – Windsor	644 – Hamilton	648 – Kirkland Lake	650 – Toronto	679 – Thunder Bay	793 – Sudbury	874 – Huntsville
	919 – Sault Ste Marie	930 – Schumacher	936 – Bothwell	954 – Hamilton	961 – West Toronto	975 – Toronto	977 – Toronto	
Quebec	739 – Montreal	814 – Val D'Or	866 – Montreal	990 – Montreal				
Saskatchewan	521 – Saskatoon							

=== Croatia ===
Croatia	2000 – Zagreb	2001 – Ogulin	2004 – Koprivnica	2005 – Rijeka	2006 – Split	2007 – Županja
