= Pittsburgh City Paper =

Weekly newspaper

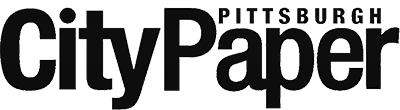
- Type: Alternative Weekly
- Format: Tabloid
- Owner: LocalMatters
- President: Donald Block
- Editor-in-chief: Ali Trachta
- News editor: Colin Williams
- Photo editor: Mars Johnson
- Launched: 1990; 36 years ago
- Ceased publication: December 31, 2025
- Relaunched: March 19, 2026
- Language: English
- Headquarters: 4 Smithfield Street, Suite 1210; Pittsburgh, Pennsylvania 15222
- City: Pittsburgh
- Country: United States
- ISSN: 1066-0062
- OCLC number: 26849157
- Website: pghcitypaper.com
- Free online archives: Yes

The Pittsburgh City Paper is Pittsburgh's leading alternative weekly newspaper which focused on local news, opinion, and arts and entertainment. It bought out In Pittsburgh Weekly in 2001. As of April 2015, City Paper was the 14th largest (by circulation) alternative weekly in the United States. Under Block Communications, it ceased publication on December 31, 2025. However, under new ownership, the Paper resumed operations on March 19, 2026 and. continues publishing new articles weekly.

== History ==
The Pittsburgh City Paper is a free publication and is distributed in most neighborhoods throughout the Greater Pittsburgh area every Wednesday, with about 70,000 copies printed weekly.

The Pittsburgh City Paper is locally owned and has no business relationship with other City Papers found in other cities such as the Washington City Paper and Philadelphia City Paper. In 2016, Steel City Media sold the City Paper to the owners of the Butler Eagle.

On May 15, 2018, City Paper terminated editor Charlie Deitch following pressure from City Paper and Butler Eagle publisher Butler Color Press after a disagreement over coverage of controversial Pennsylvania state representative Daryl Metcalfe. Deitch would go on to found the direct competitor, Pittsburgh Current, as a result.

In 2023, a subsidiary of Block Communications Inc., owner of the Pittsburgh Post-Gazette and Toledo Blade, bought the Pittsburgh City Paper. The company closed the paper at the end of 2025. The paper soon relaunched on March 19, 2026.

== See also ==
- Pittsburgh Post-Gazette
