= Pittsburgh Current =

- Type: Alternative Weekly
- Format: Tabloid
- Founder(s): Charlie Deitch, Bethany Ruhe
- Publisher: Charlie Deitch
- Managing editor: Haley Frederick
- Launched: July 11, 2018; 8 years ago
- Ceased publication: 2021
- Headquarters: 1665 Broadway Avenue; Pittsburgh, Pennsylvania 15216
- City: Pittsburgh
- Country: United States
- Price: Free
- OCLC number: 1057123446
- Website: pittsburghcurrent.com

The Pittsburgh Current was a free weekly alternative newspaper in Pittsburgh, Pennsylvania. The paper was distributed on Wednesdays and covers local news and arts. It was founded in 2018 by Charlie Deitch to promote Freedom of the press claiming his former employer Pittsburgh City Paper engaged in censorship. The paper ceased sometime in 2021.

== History ==
=== Founding ===
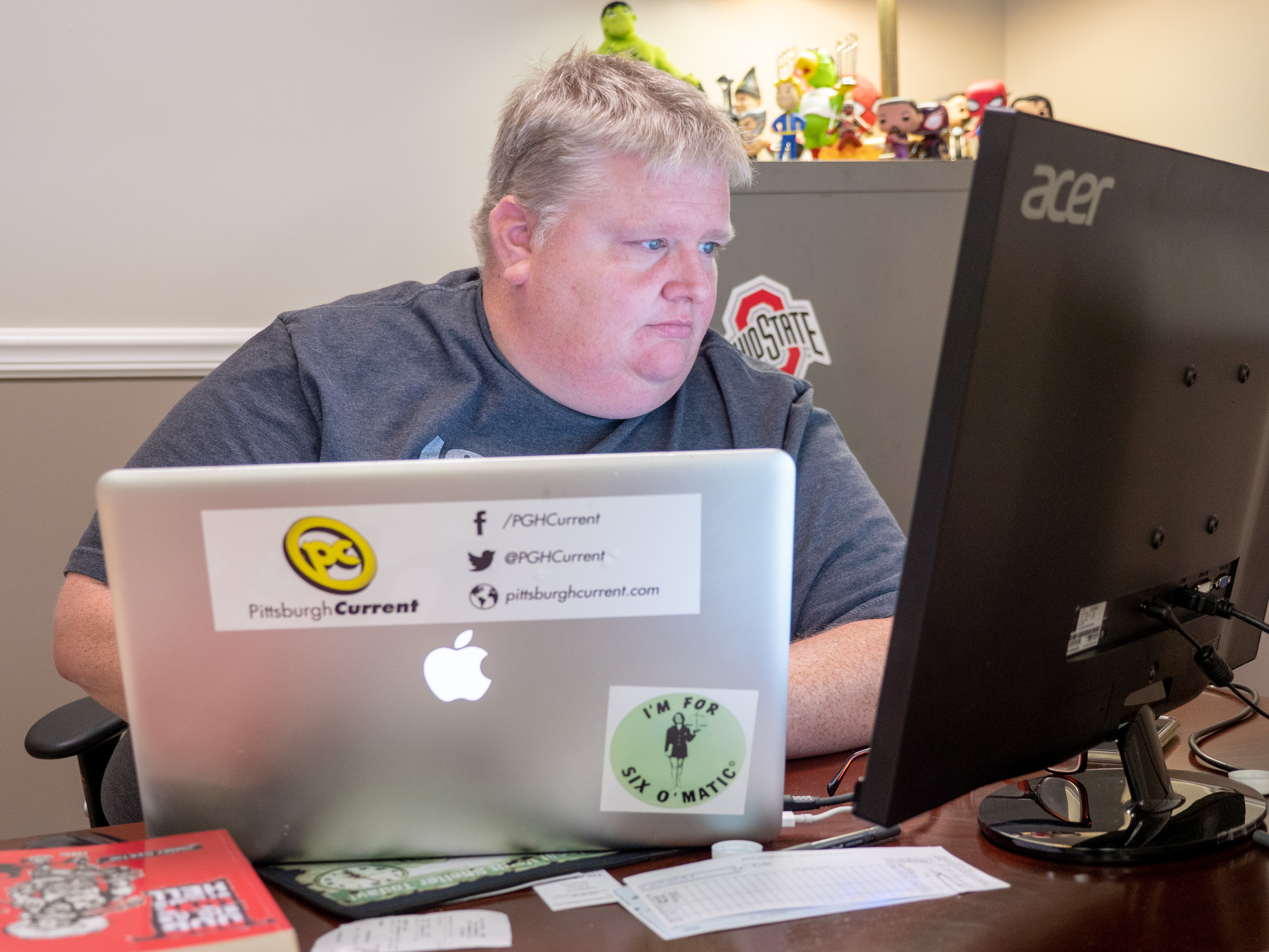
Charlie Deitch, Pittsburgh Current founder and publisher

The paper was founded by Charlie Deitch, former editor-in-chief of Pittsburgh City Paper. He alleged his May 15, 2018 firing was a result of his criticism of politician Daryl Metcalfe. The article in question, "Pennsylvania Rep. Daryl Metcalfe has Proven Himself Unfit for Office" ran on May 2, 2018. The City Paper staff, which included Deitch, brought harsh criticism against Metcalfe, 'his opinions and beliefs to be racist, xenophobic, close-minded and full of general numb-skullery'. Two days later, a published article would attack Metcalfe's pro-gun rally for attracting white supremacists.

Upon seeing the article Vernon L. Wise III, the President of Eagle Media Corp. which owned the Pittsburgh City Paper, contacted Deitch. He instructed Deitch to refocus the paper's reporting to Pittsburgh politics. Deitch pushed back saying though Metcalfe was not a Pittsburgh politician, his position in the Pennsylvania House of Representatives impacts the Pittsburgh area. Wise then fired Deitch on May 15, 2018. Deitch recalls the interaction and asserts Wise stated Metcalfe was a personal client, thus making Wise's action an act of censorship. Wise declined to comment to local press about the firing.

Deitch launched the a Kickstarter campaign on June 12, 2018, to found the creation of the Pittsburgh Current. The newspaper would copy the same format and take several staffers from Pittsburgh City Paper putting it in direct competition of his old employer. “I was mad at them for not for being the publication that I thought they should be.” Deitch stated. This was Deitch's way to combat censorship and the campaign successfully raised $21,161 from 334 backers.

The first issue of the Pittsburgh Current ran in July 2018. The paper ceased its print edition during the COVID-19 pandemic and stopped updating its website in May 2021.

The Current struggled financially. Deitch launched a journalism nonprofit separate from the Current called the Pittsburgh Institute for Nonprofit Journalism. It opened sometime 2021, and then ceased in 2024.

=== Rob Rogers Comics ===
Rob Rogers, the Pittsburgh Post-Gazette’s former editorial cartoonist, was fired on June 14, 2018. Rogers had worked at the Post-Gazette since 1993, but John Robinson Block has shifted newspapers editorial stance in a more conservative direction. The Post-Gazette had killed 19 of Rogers cartoons from March to June 2018. Roger's cartoons often made fun of President Trump. He claims this was the reason for his termination. The Pittsburgh Current picked up Rob Roger's comics for local syndication in response.
