= Zajedničar =

Newspaper of the Croatian Fraternal Union of America

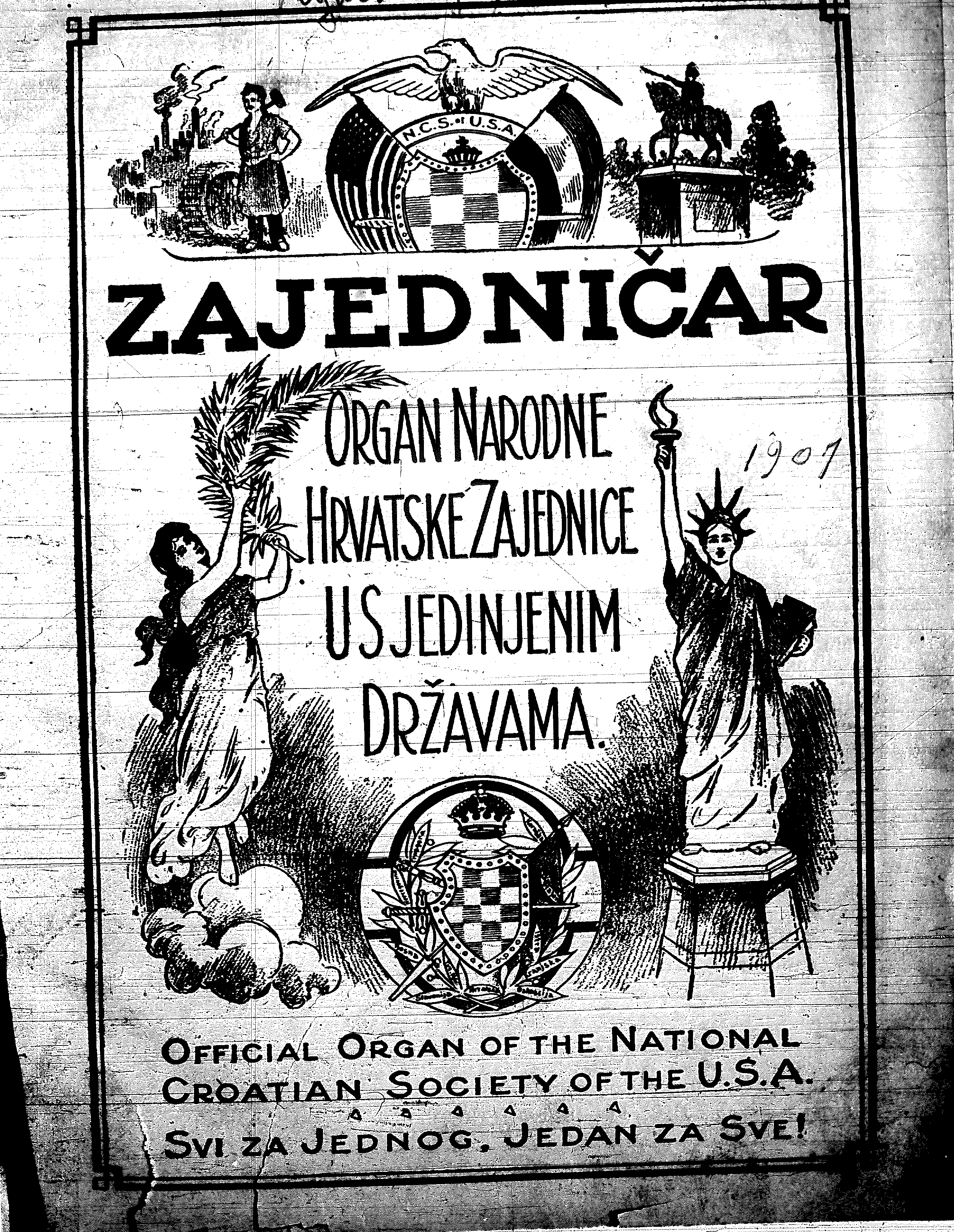
- Front page of a 1907 issue of Zajedničar
- Type: Newspaper
- Owner: Croatian Fraternal Union
- Founder: Josip Marohnić
- Founded: 1904
- Language: Bilingual (English and Croatian)
- Headquarters: Pittsburgh, Pennsylvania, United States
- OCLC number: 2269819
- Website: cfu.org/zajednicar/

Zajedničar (Fraternalist) is a newspaper of the Croatian Fraternal Union of America (CFU), a fraternal benefit society of the Croatian diaspora.

The magazine was started in 1904, during the CFU's presidency of Josip Marohnić, its founder and the first president.

Zajedničar is headquartered and printed in Pittsburgh, Pennsylvania. It is published in dual-language format with the first section in English and the second section being a full Croatian translation. Since 2009, the newspaper is also distributed in PDF format. The paper is the only ongoing Croatian-language newspaper in the United States.

Another publication called Narodni Zajedničar (People's Fraternalist) was launched by Croatian communists within the CFU in 1939, but it was short-lived and no surviving copies are known to exist. It formed part of non-English press of the Communist Party USA.
