= The Lost Throne =

2008 novel by Chris Kuzneski

- Author: Chris Kuzneski
- Genre: Thriller
- Publisher: Penguin UK, Putnam
- Publication date: 2008 (UK); 2009 (US)
- Publication place: United States
- ISBN: 0-14-103707-5
- OCLC: 237190514
- Preceded by: Sword of God
- Followed by: The Prophecy

The Lost Throne is the fourth novel by New York Times bestselling author Chris Kuzneski. Published in November 2008 by Penguin UK, the action thriller peaked at #5 on the British fiction chart and stayed in the Top 10 for four weeks. Putnam released the American hardcover in July 2009. It won the Bronze Medal for Popular Fiction at the Florida Book Awards, which is America’s most comprehensive state book awards program. The American paperback reached the New York Times mass-market bestseller list in July 2010.
