= Vinko Žganec =

Croatian ethnomusicologist (1890–1976)

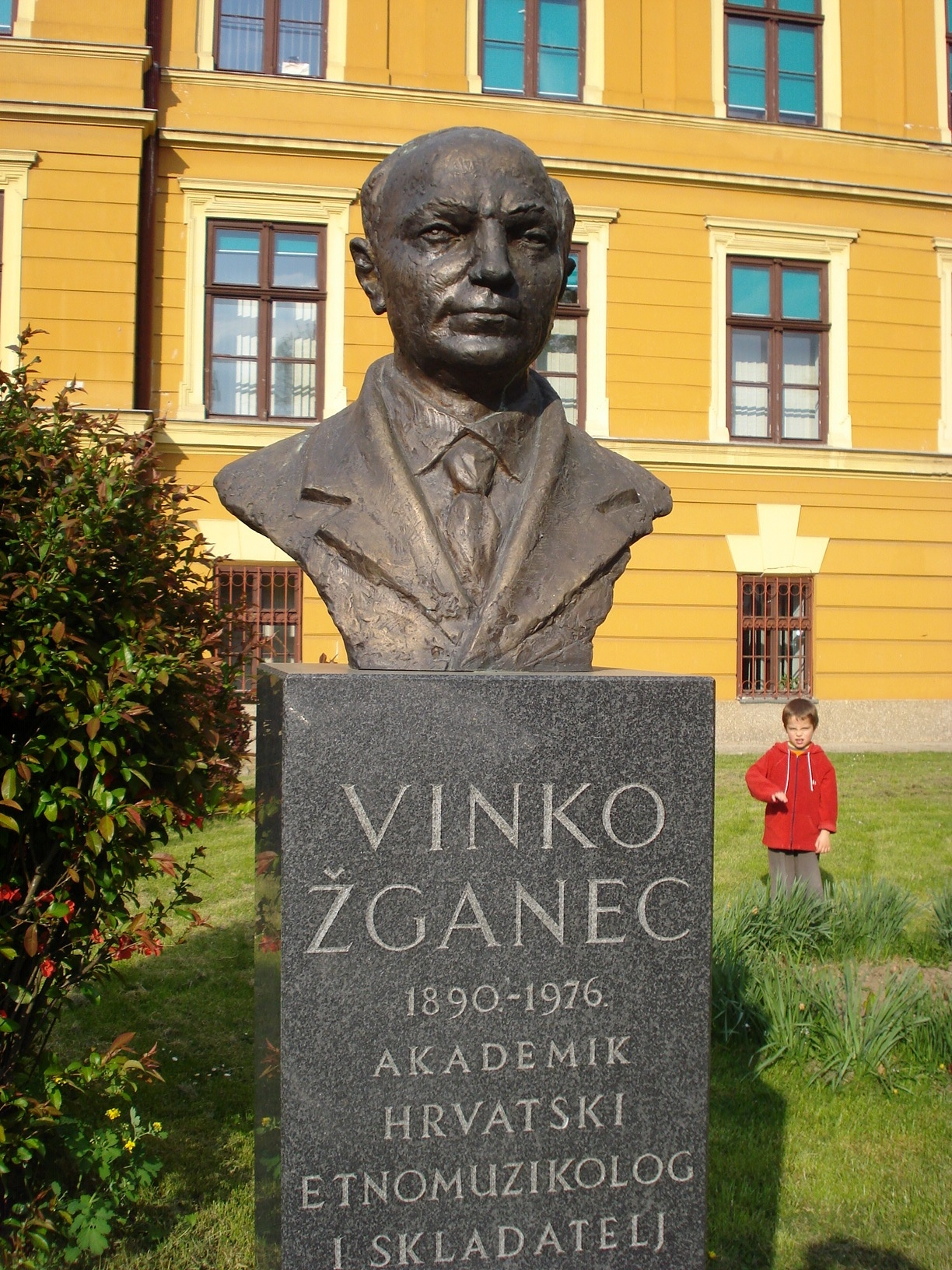
Vinko Žganec bust in Čakovec

Vinko Žganec (January 22, 1890 – December 12, 1976) was a Croatian ethnomusicologist.

Žganec was born in Vratišinec in Međimurje. He started to be interested in music early in his childhood and jotted down his first folk song in 1908. In 1916, he published his first book of Croatian folk songs from Međimurje. Later he extended the work to cover the Bunjevci Croats in Hungary and Croats from Gradišće in Austria. He studied theology and later law, becoming a Doctor of Law in 1919.

The composer and ethnomusicologist Béla Bartók kept in close contact with him while collecting folk songs along the border of Hungary and Croatia. Bartók respected Žganec because of both the accuracy of his research and the notation. Music started to be his primary focus in 1945 when he became the head of the Ethnographic Museum in Zagreb. During the span of his research, Žganec collected, recorded, and wrote down more than 19,000 songs, including many Croatian tamburica; these have been preserved for future generations to be used and studied. There is some evidence that he collected more than 25,000 songs (15,000 just from his native Međimurje). Some of them were not entirely documented.

Žganec became the first director of the Institute of Folklore Research, and was an active participant in the Folklorist Society of Croatia. He taught at the Academy of Music in Zagreb where he was a great influence on his colleagues and students. Similar to Žganec's work was that of Franjo Kuhač, another man who devoted his life to research on the national cultural heritage.
