= Josip Marohnić =

Croatian emigrant in the Americas

- Born: 12 November 1866; Hreljin, Croatia
- Died: 23 January 1921 (aged 54)
- Education: Wheaton College (Illinois)
- Occupations: publisher, writer, editor

Josip Marohnić (November 12, 1866 – January 23, 1921) was a Croatian publisher, writer, editor. He is considered to be one of the most influential Croatian emigrant in the Americas.

== Life ==
Marohnić was born in Hreljin, Croatia (then in the Austrian Empire) and lived in the United States for 28 years, where he emigrated alone in 1893 and was later joined by his wife Andrijana and daughter Josipa. He started working at a Chicago's local printing house before attending Wheaton College (Illinois). He later founded his own print house and bookstore, and became publisher, writer and editor of his newspaper "Hrvatski glasnik".

In 1897, Marohnić moved to Pittsburgh where he founded the Croatian Eastern Rite Catholic St. Nicholas Parish, the first Croatian Byzantine Rite parish in America, and invited a Croatian pastor to spiritually lead Croatian-Americans. He acted as the main accountant of the National Croatian Community (preceding the Croatian Fraternal Union founded on 11th convention) between 1897 and 1909. He was also the founding father and lifetime President of the Croatian Fraternal Union from 1912 until his death. Marohnić devoted his life to Croatians in the US and they honored him with a magnificent funeral.

Marohnić founded the "First Croatian Bookstore" in Allegheny, Pennsylvania. As an editor, he published books, manuals, grammars, dictionaries, calendars, novels, anthologies, short stories, theatrical works, humorous books, collections of poetry, various books of Croatian folklore, maps, albums, breviaries and books of religious nature.

He was the first poet among the Croatian diaspora, having published his collections "Jesenke" in 1897 and "Amerikanke" in 1900 and his "Census of Croats in America". In 1911, he was the first Croat officially invited by an American president.

He died on January 23, 1921, leaving behind his wife and four children.

== Legacy ==
A street in Trnje, Zagreb, the Croatian capital, was named after him; the street is now the site of SRCE ("Sveučilišni računski centar" - "University Computing Centre").

== See also ==
- Croatian Fraternal Union
