= Chris Kuzneski =

American novelist (born 1969)

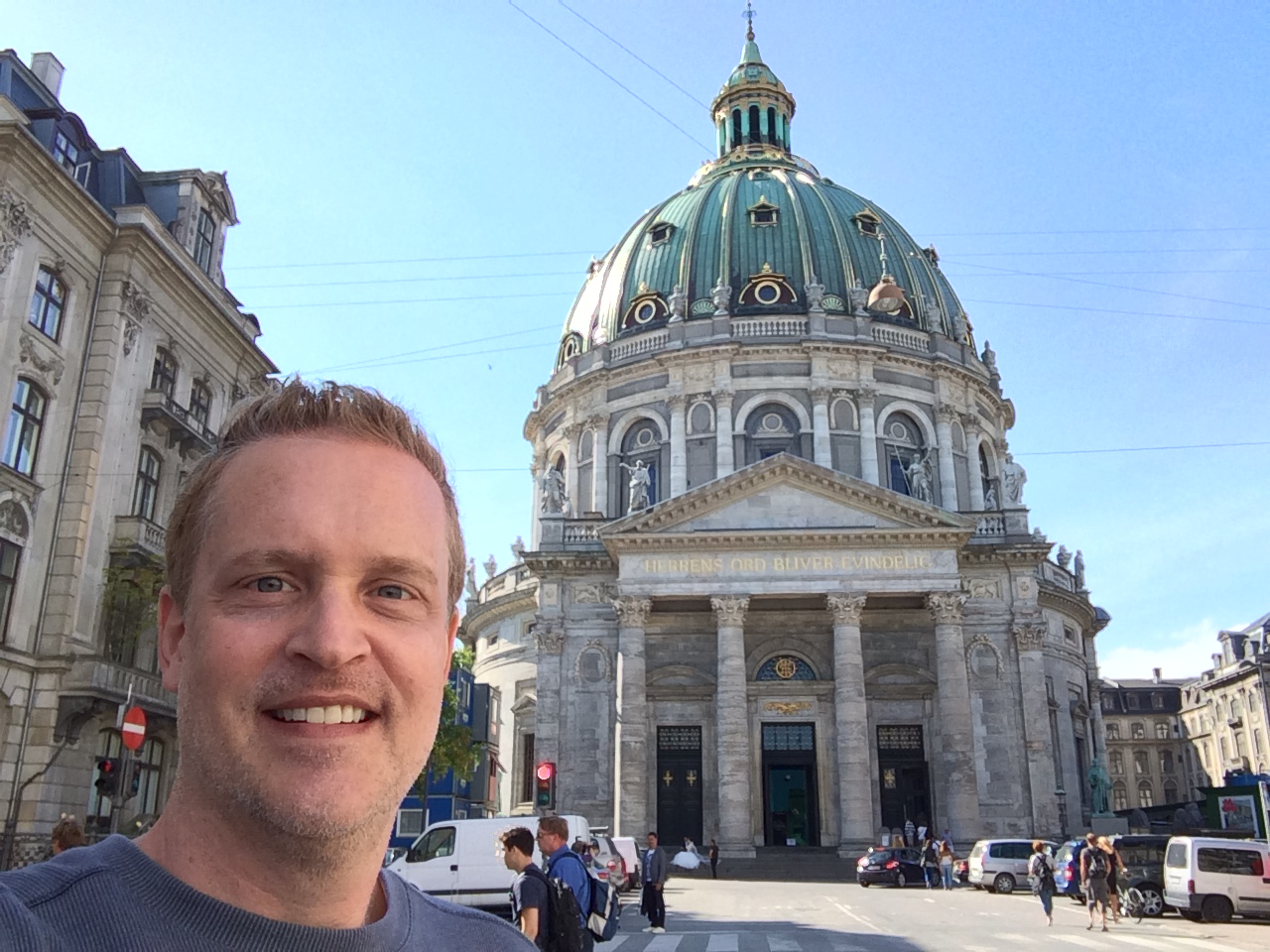
- Born: September 2, 1969 (age 57); Indiana, Pennsylvania, U.S.
- Education: Master of Arts
- Alma mater: University of Pittsburgh
- Occupation: Author
- Writing career
- Genres: Action-adventure, Action-thriller, Adventure, Mystery, Thriller, Techno-thriller
- Notable works: The Plantation; Sign of the Cross; Sword of God; The Lost Throne; The Hunters
- Website: chriskuzneski.com

Chris Kuzneski (born September 2, 1969) is an American novelist. His eleventh novel, The Prisoner's Gold, won the Thriller Award for the 2016 Book of the Year at a gala hosted by the International Thriller Writers (ITW) in New York City on July 9, 2016. His works have also been honored by the Florida Book Awards and named a Literary Guild's featured selection.

== Biographical sketch ==
Born in Indiana, Pennsylvania, Kuzneski currently lives in Tampa, Florida. In the fourth grade, he wrote The Monster Cookbook, which so impressed the librarian that it was bound and placed in the school library. He played football at the University of Pittsburgh where he received his undergraduate degree in writing and his master's degree in teaching. While studying at Pitt, he wrote for The Pitt News, the Indiana Gazette, and the Pittsburgh Post-Gazette. From 1992 until 1998, he taught English and coached football in two western Pennsylvania school districts and was selected to Who's Who Among America's Teachers. However, he knew he wanted to be an author, so he left teaching and started working on his first novel, The Plantation.

== Bibliography ==
Payne & Jones series

1. The Plantation (2000)
2. Sign of the Cross (2006)
3. Sword of God (2007)
4. The Lost Throne (2008)
5. The Prophecy (2009)
6. The Secret Crown (2010)
7. The Death Relic (2011)
8. The Einstein Pursuit (2013)
9. The Malta Escape (2018)

The Hunters series

1. The Hunters (2013)
2. The Forbidden Tomb (2014)
3. The Prisoner's Gold (2015)

The Hunters: Origins series

1. Before the Storm (2016)
