= The Prophecy (Kuzneski novel) =

2009 novel by Chris Kuzneski

- First edition (UK)
- Author: Chris Kuzneski
- Genre: Thriller
- Publisher: Penguin UK, Putnam
- Publication date: 2009 (UK); 2010 (US)
- Publication place: United States
- ISBN: 978-0399156595
- OCLC: 423582738
- Preceded by: The Lost Throne
- Followed by: The Secret Crown

The Prophecy is the fifth novel by New York Times bestselling author Chris Kuzneski. Published in October 2009 by Penguin UK, the action thriller follows the adventures of Jonathon Payne and David "D.J." Jones as they try to decipher a newly discovered manuscript written by Nostradamus. The book peaked at #4 on the British fiction list and stayed on the bestseller list for several weeks. Putnam released the American hardcover version in July 2010.
