= Foo Conner =

American activist and journalist

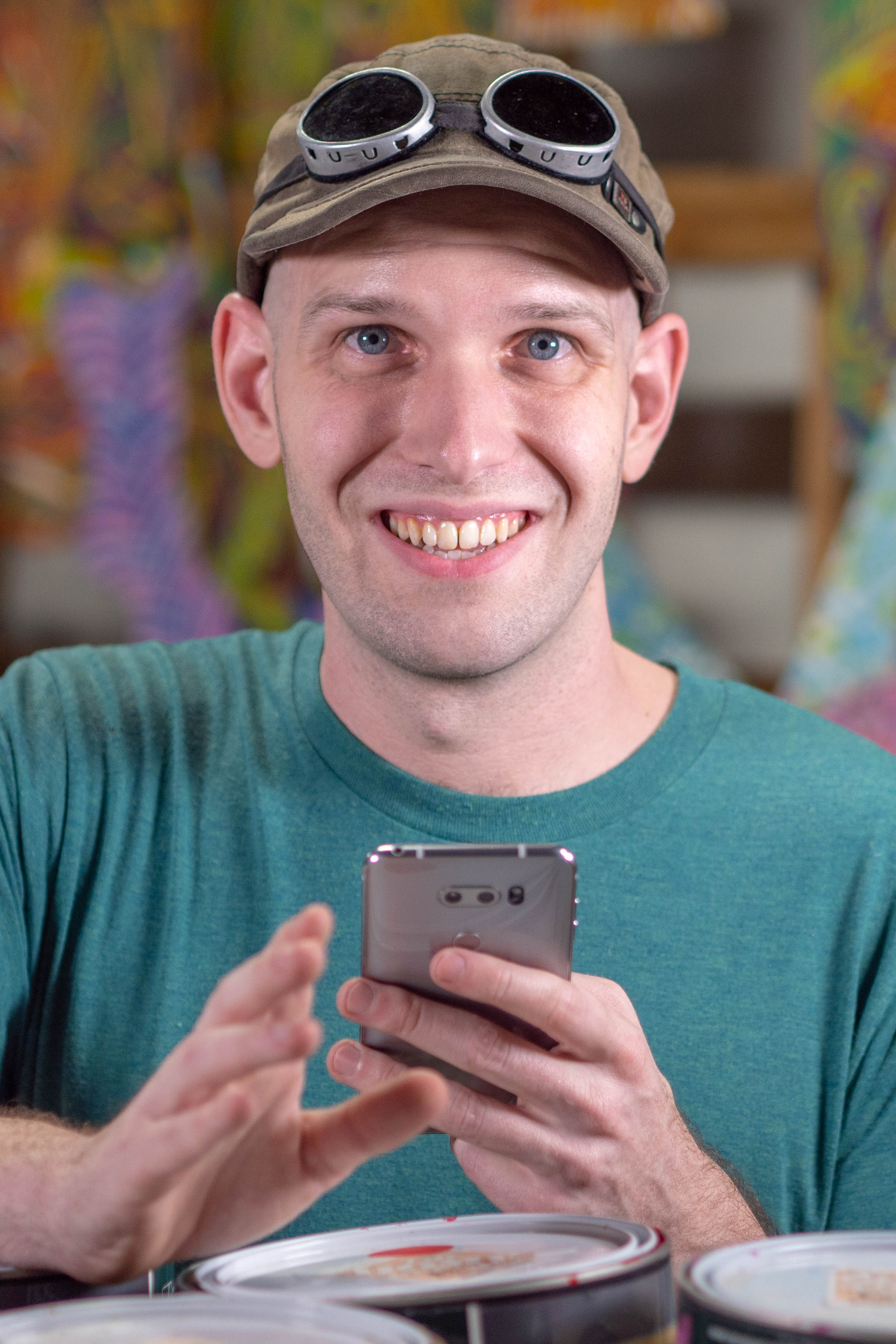
- Foo at Randyland in February 2019
- Born: Andrew Conner; September 8, 1985 (age 40); Charleston, West Virginia, U.S.
- Occupations: Activist; Entrepreneur; Journalist; Humanitarian; YouTuber
- Years active: 2001–present
- Known for: Occupy Wall Street, Randyland
- Title: CEO of Jekko; Entrepreneur-in-Residence at Carnegie Mellon University; Co-host of G3AR
- Movement: Occupy
- Father: Glenn Conner

YouTube information
- Channel: GreekGadgetGuru
- Genres: Vlogging; Gaming; Lifestyle
- Subscribers: 591,000
- Views: 57.6 million
- Last updated: August 4, 2026
- Website: foo.press

Foo Conner (born September 8, 1985) is an American activist, entrepreneur, and journalist. He is known for his work on Occupy Wall Street, Randyland, Social journalism, and as a YouTube personality.

== Personal life ==
Foo Conner was born in Charleston, West Virginia. He grew up on a small subsistence farm right outside of the city in Mink Shoals, West Virginia. His father was a photojournalist for United Press International and taught Foo the craft at an early age.

Although he has been called Foo since childhood, Conner officially changed his name to Foo in 2018. Foo squats an otherwise abandoned house to advocate for housing rights. Touring bands often play there. In February 2016, babies born in Allegheny County, Pennsylvania were gifted prints of Foo's artwork. Conner is an Entrepreneur-in-Residence at Carnegie Mellon University since 2020.

== Career ==
Conner got his start producing free punk rock festivals at Skatopia. The anti-authoritarian atmosphere of his events caught the attention of Rolling Stone. Upon hearing the call to protest, he became a core organizer for Occupy Wall Street movement speaking out against Economic inequality.

On the weekends he co-hosts the G3AR YouTube channel, where they build super hero gadgets and test them similar to MythBusters. The channel has amassed over 600,000 subscribers.

In 2015, Conner became the co-director of Randyland, an outsider art museum promoting happiness. Leaning on his skills as a photographer, he overhauled Randyland into a Selfie Museum. His curation was wildly applauded. The New York Times described it as, "an expression of joy and an extraordinary piece of public art." Conner left the museum in February 2020.

=== Occupy Wall Street ===
In 2011, Foo helped plan the Occupy movement online. He would move to Zucotti Park in the fall. Though a leaderless movement, Conner would be recognized as a core organizer and speak on behalf of the movement. During his time at Occupy, Conner played rolls in the social media strategy and coordinate street protests. Towards the end, Pulitzer Prize winning journalist Chris Hedges told Conner, "a real activist would get into the news". Conner would use his experiences and that advice to go on to found Jekko, a news website covering current events and technology news.

=== Journalism ===
Foo is a prolific journalist covering upwards of five hundred events a year through social media. Conner's society photography is reminiscent of late American photographer Bill Cunningham who took candid photos and traveled to events by bicycle. The uniqueness of the style has led other society columns to occasionally mention if Conner attends an event. In 2016, he was nominated for Blogger of the Year at Style Week Pittsburgh. He is known for his gonzo journalism "activistartist-journalist" style. His work aims for a neutral point of view. This applies to his technology commentary too, which he has been doing for over a decade.

== Awards ==
- Mayor's Public Art Award of 2019.
- April 1, 2022 was proclaimed April Foo's Day in Allegheny County.

== See also ==
- Randyland
- Occupy Wall Street
