= Sword of God (novel) =

2007 thriller novel by Chris Kuzneski

- Author: Chris Kuzneski
- Language: English
- Genre: Thriller
- Publisher: Jove, Penguin UK
- Publication date: 2007
- Publication place: United States
- ISBN: 0-515-14356-1
- OCLC: 172991814
- Preceded by: Sign of the Cross
- Followed by: The Lost Throne

Sword of God was the third novel by Chris Kuzneski. First published in September 2007 by Penguin Group (USA), the action thriller followed the exploits of Jonathon Payne and David "D.J." Jones as they slipped into the Islamic city of Mecca in order to rescue an American archaeologist. The book was endorsed by several notable authors, including Nelson DeMille, Vince Flynn, James Rollins, and Douglas Preston.

Penguin UK released the British version of Sword of God in October 2007, and the book climbed to #6 on the British bestseller list. Despite its controversial subject matter, foreign rights have sold in several Muslim nations (Turkey, Indonesia, etc.)

== Reviews ==
- From Publishers Weekly — “This globe-crossing action thriller, like its predecessor, evokes the spirit of Dan Brown with welcome doses of Lee Child’s ex-military tough-guy grit.”
- From Vince Flynn — “A non-stop locomotive of a thriller. Combines labyrinthine plot twists, global terrorism, and the darkest depths of psychological warfare in a thriller that had me burning the midnight oil 'til breakfast... Kuzneski is a master in the making.”
- From James Rollins — “Sword of God is as convincing as it is terrifying. Riveting and relentlessly paced, here is novel that will be consumed in one sitting. Chris Kuzneski proves again that he is thriller writer for the new millennium.”
- From Douglas Preston — “Reading Sword of God is like jumping on a runaway freight train hurtling toward disaster, with the fate of the world in the balance... A fabulous premise, great characters, rich settings, and mach-5 pacing. Explosive!”
