= Three Rivers Review =

US literary magazine

- Categories: Literature
- Frequency: bi-annual (1995-2008), annual (2008-present)
- Founded: 1995
- Country: United States
- Based in: Pittsburgh, Pennsylvania
- Website: Three Rivers Review

Three Rivers Review, or Three Rivers Review of Undergraduate Literature, is a literary magazine published by the University of Pittsburgh Honors College. Three Rivers Review was established in the Fall of 1995 as a student produced magazine called Thirst. It now publishes work by students at the University of Pittsburgh, University of Pittsburgh Regional campuses, and post-secondary undergraduate institutions in the Greater Pittsburgh area.

In July 2010, Three Rivers Review Volume XIV was awarded the National Program Directors' Prize for Undergraduate Literary Magazine Content by the Association of Writers & Writing Programs.
