= Payday Report =

U.S. labor and union news agency

- Covering Labor in News Deserts
- Website type: News
- Available in: English
- Headquarters: Pittsburgh, Pennsylvania, U.S.
- Area served: United States
- Founder: Mike Elk
- Website: paydayreport.com
- Commercial: Yes
- Registration: Optional
- Launched: 2016
- Current status: Active

Payday Report is an American news agency covering labor and union news. Founded in 2016 by Mike Elk, the outlet now runs as a cooperative. Their original reporting is frequently syndicated to NPR, The Guardian, and more. Payday Report is funded directly by readers via crowdfunding.

During the COVID-19 lockdowns, Payday Report received wide acclaim for tracking wildcat strikes across the United States.

== History ==
Mike Elk, a longtime labor reporter, founded Payday Report. Elk had previously worked for Politico until he was fired for attempting unionization. This resulted in a National Labor Review Board settlement in Elk's favor. The settlement, combined with crowdfunding, helped to established the news outlet in Chattanooga in 2016. It relocated to Elk's hometown Pittsburgh in 2018.

Most news outlets attach the labor beat to general reporters. However, Payday Report has been one of the few news agencies dedicated to labor reporting. According to Columbia Journalism Review this leads to a "more nuanced and solutions-based" reporting. Notable stories include the 2018 West Virginia teachers' strike and uncovering sexual misconduct at the Pittsburgh Post-Gazette.
