= Butler Eagle =

Daily newspaper published in Butler, Pennsylvania, United States

- Butler County's great daily newspaper
- Type: Daily newspaper
- Owner: Eagle Printing Company
- Founded: 1903
- Headquarters: 514 West Wayne Street Butler, PA 16001
- OCLC number: 2258809
- Website: butlereagle.com

The Butler Eagle is a daily newspaper published in Butler, Pennsylvania, United States. It serves the Pittsburgh metropolitan county of Butler.

== History ==
The family-owned paper was founded in 1903 with the merging of the Butler County Observer (originally the Evans City Times) and the original Butler Eagle. The newspaper has been owned by the Wise family since its inception. The Art Deco office building was constructed in 1924, and is still used by the Eagle. It is located at 114 West Diamond Street in downtown Butler. In 2003, printing operations were moved to a new facility in the Island neighborhood of Butler. The Erie Times is printed here and delivered daily to Erie, Pennsylvania.

== Assets ==
Other publications owned by Butler Eagle include Butler Business Matters. The company sold the Pittsburgh City Paper to Cars Holding, Inc., a subsidiary of Block Communications Inc., in January 2023. The Butler Eagle also owns an advertising company, Harmony Outdoor Ads.
