= University Times =

Newspaper in Pittsburgh, Pennsylvania

- The June 9, 2011 front page of the University Times
- Type: Bi-weekly newspaper
- Format: Tabloid
- Publisher: University of Pittsburgh
- Editor: N. J. Brown
- Staff writers: Kimberly K. Barlow; Peter Hart
- Founded: 1968
- Headquarters: 308 Bellefield Hall; Pittsburgh, PA 15260
- Circulation: 11,000
- OCLC number: 2161325
- Website: www.utimes.pitt.edu

University Times is a bi-weekly, independent newspaper published in Pittsburgh, Pennsylvania by the University of Pittsburgh since 1968. It primarily serves as the faculty and staff newspaper of the university, but is also distributed at facilities of the University of Pittsburgh Medical Center.

== History ==
University Times was first published in December 1968 under its own charter, making it an independent newspaper for the university's faculty and staff. Initially published quarterly, it was released in the months of December, March, June, and September. The newspaper was intended to replace a myriad of newsletters from individuals schools and departments in the university. An editorial in the first issue described its initial intended purpose as one that would "keep you up to date on the 'times' at Pitt" – from the changing face of the campus to the activities of the alumni, from the antics of the students to the deeper emotional involvements of education today." By the 1970s, University Times was being published bi-weekly, and by 1979, faced controversy when the university planned to end its publication because of "apparent dissatisfaction about controversial stories" when the paper ran articles about faculty disagreements with the administration and an article about a dispute between two deans. A unanimous 42–0 vote from the university faculty assembly requested the university rescind its plan to end the paper. The paper again faced controversy over the alleged censorship of a 1994 story on the first gay wedding to occur in the university's Heinz Memorial Chapel. However, Leon Haley, then publisher of the newspaper, defended the decision in saying that it was "not university policy to write stories about events at Heinz Chapel. These events are personal and private." Ken Hall, one of the men married in the ceremony, also stated that he "didn't want any notoriety or controversy to mar the occasion."

== Today ==
Currently University Times is published every other Thursday from September through July in a multi-colored, tabloid format. Still primarily serving as the faculty and staff newspaper of the university, it has a circulation of 11,000 and is distributed for free at over 80 locations in the facilities of the University of Pittsburgh and the University of Pittsburgh Medical Center located in the Oakland neighborhood of Pittsburgh, where it is published, as well in facilities located in the Shadyside, Lawrenceville, and Southside neighborhoods of the city. In addition, it is distributed outside of Pittsburgh at the university's four regional campuses in Bradford, Greensburg, Johnstown, and Titusville. University Times can also be found at the main branch of the Carnegie Library of Pittsburgh. The newspaper is also available as a mailing subscription for $25 per year. Full versions of the paper are also available for free on-line, including archived versions dating back to September 1994.

University Times incorporates news and feature articles, as well as a classified section and paid advertising. Regular features include a letters to the newspaper section, an events calendar, "Research Notes" which informs readers about funding awarded to university researchers or findings arising from university research, and "People of the Times", a feature reporting news about faculty and staff including awards, honors, accomplishments, or significant academic appointments. Special annual issues include the "Back to School Issue", which describes all of the new people, places and things at the university at the beginning of each academic year, as well as a "Books, Journals, and More" supplement that recognizes faculty and staff who have written, edited, or translated books or those who have primary responsibility for journals, electronic publications, plays, or musical compositions.

The paper is printed via a non-heatset web offset process with 85 line screen halftones.

Stories in University Times have been cited or quoted in other newspapers and press agencies, including the Pittsburgh Post-Gazette, the Pittsburgh Tribune-Review, the Chicago Tribune, and the Associated Press.

== Awards ==
Writers for University Times have won numerous awards for their contributions, including the Press Club of Western Pennsylvania's Golden Quill Award, the Golden Triangle Award from the Pittsburgh chapter of the International Association of Business Communicators, and the Robert L. Vann Award from the Pittsburgh Black Media Federation.

=== Partial list of award winners ===
Golden Quill Award, Press Club of Western Pennsylvania

- 1970, Mary Lou Burger, Spot News Reporting.
- 1983, Bruce Steele, Cultural Writing
- 2005, Bruce Steele, finalist, Cultural Writing

Golden Triangle Award, IABC/Pittsburgh

Award of Excellence

- 2008, Kimberly Barlow, Writing: Features, "Climbers Check Out Heinz Chapel"

Award of Honor

- 2008, Kimberly Barlow & Peter Hart, Writing: News, "Cleaning It Up"

Robert L. Vann Award, Pittsburgh Black Media Federation

- 2011, Peter Hart, News Feature, "Making Pitt Work: Deborah Walker"

== See also ==
- The Pitt News
