= D-Scribe Digital Publishing =

Open access electronic publishing University of Pittsburgh

Coordinates: 40.445256°N 79.927006°W

- D-Scribe Digital Publishing program of the University Library System, University of Pittsburgh
- Parent company: University Library System of the University of Pittsburgh
- Country of origin: United States
- Headquarters location: Pittsburgh
- Publication types: archives, academic journals
- Official website: digital.library.pitt.edu library.pitt.edu/publications

D-Scribe Digital Publishing is an open access electronic publishing program of the University Library System (ULS) of the University of Pittsburgh. It comprises over 100 thematic collections that together contain over 100,000 digital objects. This content, most of which is available through open access, includes both digitized versions of materials from the collections of the University of Pittsburgh and other local institutions as well as original 'born-electronic' content actively contributed by scholars worldwide. D-Scribe includes such items as photographs, maps, books, journal articles, dissertations, government documents, and technical reports, along with over 745 previously out-of-print titles published by the University of Pittsburgh Press. The digital publishing efforts of the University Library System began in 1998 and have won praise for their innovation from the leadership at the Association of Research Libraries and peer institutions.

== Major digitized collections ==
Plate 256, Purple Heron, of Pitt's digitized collection of Audubon's The Birds of America

The University Library System at the University of Pittsburgh has created various digital collections through its D-Scribe Digital Publishing program and has made them available to the public via the Internet. The following is a selection of the more prominent or larger collections available online.

=== 19th-century schoolbooks ===
A full-text digitized presentation of over 140 historic books in the 16,000 volume Neitz Old Textbook Collection. The textbooks date from the 19th century and are fully searchable.

=== Archive of European Integration ===
A digitized repository and archive of material dealing with European integration that focuses on the normalization of relations of Eastern and Western Europe following the Cold War and the integration movements in West Europe that resulted in the European Community. Nearly 30 universities throughout Europe and America contribute content to the AEI. The AEI collects both independently produced research materials and official European Community/European Union documents. Many of the digitized documents in the AEI are drawn from the University Library System's collection of EU documents received in 2007 when the library of the Delegation of the European Commission to the US in Washington, D.C. was donated to the University of Pittsburgh.

=== Audubon's Birds of America ===
The University's complete double elephant folio set of John James Audubon's The Birds of America, one of only 120 complete sets of all 435 plates in existence, was preserved and restored over a five-month process in 2000. In 2007, along with the five volume set of Audubon's Ornithological Biography, the plates were digitized at high resolution and made available in one complete online collection.

=== Darlington Digital Library ===
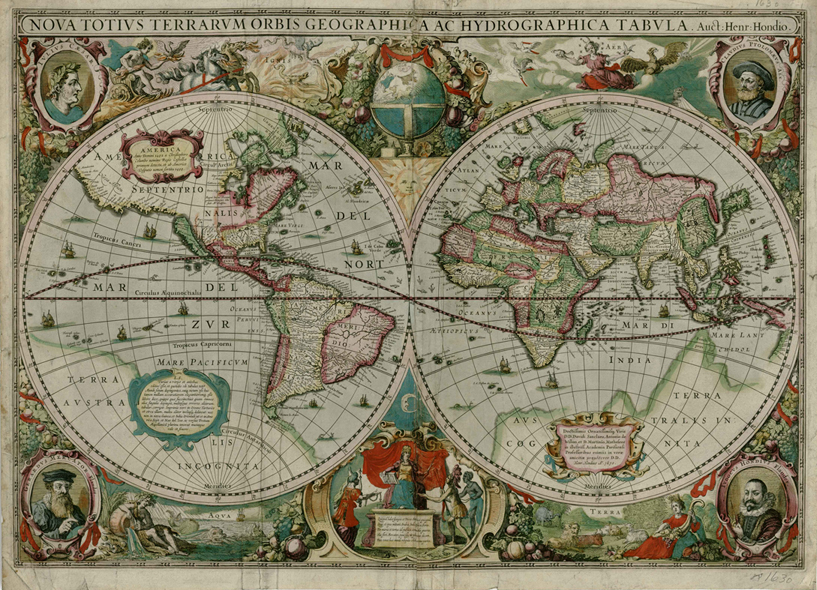
1630 map by Hendrik Hondius I that is part of the Darlington Digital Library

The Darlington Digital Library contains digitized materials from the Darlington Memorial Library. The Library is a major collection related to American history, particularly colonial American history in Western Pennsylvania. Digitized items included vintage atlases, books, broadsides, images, manuscripts, and maps.

=== Dick Thornburgh Papers ===
Former Pennsylvania governor and United States Attorney General Dick Thornburgh donated his personal papers to the University of Pittsburgh in 1998. Portions of the collection are digitized and arranged in twenty-one chronological sections, representing Thornburgh's life and career, each with introductory information about the point in time, the position held, and items of importance.

=== George Washington Manuscripts ===
A digitized collection of broadsides manuscripts, maps, images, and personal communications that depict George Washington's time in Western Pennsylvania at various points in his career.

=== Historic Pittsburgh Collection ===
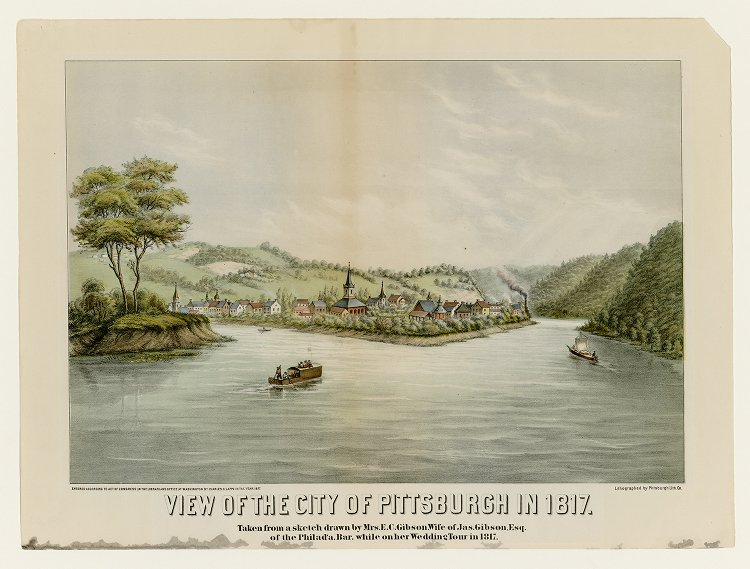
A view of the City of Pittsburgh in 1817, taken from a sketch by E. C. Gibson, is part of the Pittsburgh Prints Collection of D-Scribe's Historic Pittsburgh collection

This digital collection includes digitized historical resources on the history of Western Pennsylvania including texts, videos, maps, images, census records, and archival finding aids. Included are over 25,000 images from multiple photographic collections that originated from a digitization project funded by the Institute of Museum and Library Services and completed in 2004. The presentation represents a collaboration between Pittsburgh-area libraries, museums, and universities and includes historic material derived from those held by the University Library System, University of Pittsburgh; the Library & Archives at the Heinz History Center; Chatham University Archives; Oakmont Carnegie Library; Pittsburgh History & Landmarks Foundation; and Point Park University Archives.

=== University of Pittsburgh Press Digital Editions ===
The University of Pittsburgh Press Digital Editions is a collaboration between the University of Pittsburgh Press and the University Library System that has digitized over 745 monographs in order make them freely available to the public via the internet. Mostly out-of-print titles, the collection includes fully searchable titles from the Pitt Latin American Series; Pitt Series in Russian and East European Studies; and Composition, Literacy, and Culture.

=== Stephen Foster Sketchbook ===
A digitized and searchable presentation of Stephen Foster's sketchbook that contains 113 leaves with hand-written drafts for 64 different songs, including some unpublished ones, as well as other notations and doodles. The full sketchbook was digitized in Oxford in 2005, with the original stored in a vault at the University of Pittsburgh.

=== Other digitized collections ===
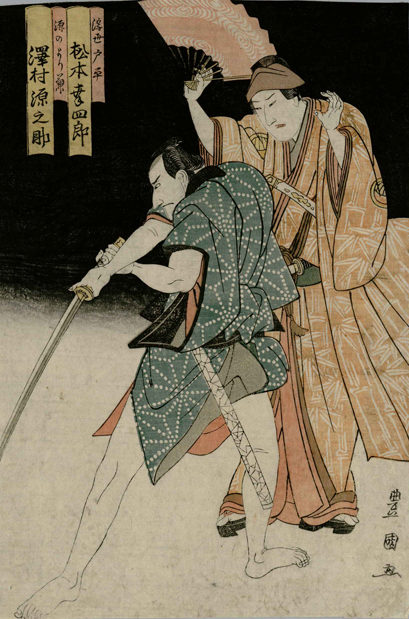
A 1790 color woodblock Japanese print by Utagawa Toyokuni depicting a night scene duel portrayed by actors Sawamura Gennosuke and Matsumoto Koshiro available in the Barry Rosensteel Japanese Print Collection

D-Scribe includes many other collections of materials and photographs. Major themes include Asian studies, labor and socialist movement, philosophy, atlases, the Carnegie Museum of Art Collection of Photographs, and historic Pittsburgh photo archives. Also included are photo archives from various conferences and industries.

==== Asian studies collections ====
The ULS has digitized a variety of titles and artwork held in the university's East Asian Library. These include the Barry Rosensteel Japanese Print Collection; Tsukioka Kōgyo, The Art of Noh, 1869-1927; and Modern China Studies.

==== Free at Last? exhibit ====
Free at Last? is an exhibit based on a collection of Allegheny County, Pennsylvania slavery manumissions discovered in 2007 by staff in the Allegheny County Recorder of Deeds Office that document the widespread existence of slavery in Western Pennsylvania up until the US Civil War period. Staged at the Heinz History Center in Pittsburgh, the exhibit focused on the original documentation coupled with interpretative panels and other artifacts to tell the story of African American slaves in Western Pennsylvania between 1792-1857. Shortly after the close of the exhibit in April 2009, the University Library System, University of Pittsburgh built a virtual exhibit with particular attention focused on the manumission documents.

==== Industry photo archives ====
D-Scribe includes photographic archives from various Western Pennsylvania companies including American Steel and Wire Company, CONSOL Energy Mining, H. J. Heinz Company, Lyon Shorb & Company, Mesta Machine Company, Otto's Suburban Dairy, Pittsburgh Railways Company, Rust Engineering Company, and Trimble Company.

==== Labor and socialist collections ====
Digitized repositories of Pittsburgh labor and socialist movements include the A.E. Forbes Communist Collection, American Left Ephemera Collection, the Cartoons of Fred Wright, the UE News Photograph Collection, the Union Switch & Signal Strike Photograph Collection, Stalinka: the Digital Library of Staliniana, as well as the Pittsburgh and Western Pennsylvania Labor Legacy project.

==== Lillian Friedberg Postcard Collection ====
A digitized collection of postcards dealing with the 1933 World's Fair in Chicago, World War II Allied and Nazi leadership propaganda, and French cartoons parodying Nazi leadership.

==== Philosophy collections ====
The ULS has digitized portions of the collected paper of prominent philosophers, including Frank P. Ramsey and Wilfrid Sellars.

== Electronic archives and repositories ==
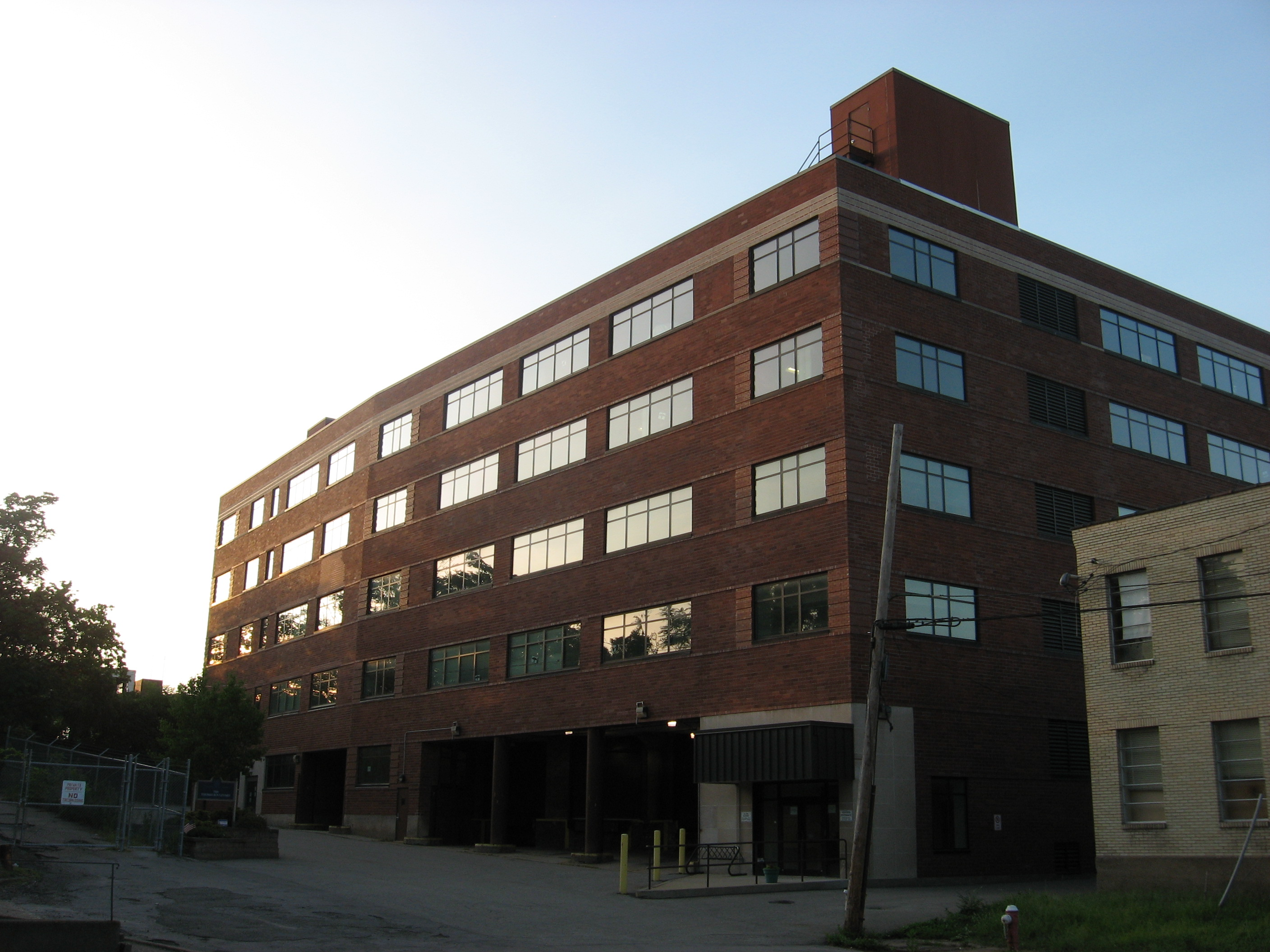
The Library Resource Facility on Thomas Boulevard is home to the Digital Research Library of the University Library System at the University of Pittsburgh

The D-Scribe Publishing Program has also developed several electronic archives and repositories. These repositories have been developed using Open Access principles, meaning that scholarly content is online, freely available, and immediately accessible to a global audience.

Archive content includes both peer-reviewed and non-refereed content; unpublished and published articles (preprints or postprints); conference proceedings; other grey literature, such as white papers, policy papers, and technical reports; multimedia content including audio, video, and images; and primary research data.

These online archives serve many needs, such as storing the scholarly works of university authors; preserving information from specific research disciplines; and disseminating new scholarly work quickly, without a lengthy publication process.

The content for these archives is drawn from a variety of sources including digitization of ULS print collections and direct author contributions from the worldwide research community. Metadata for each item published in the repository is searchable through search tools such as Google and Yahoo. Based on EPrints, free open source software developed at the University of Southampton, these subject-based repositories offer simple Web-based submission interfaces for authors and a variety of tools for readers including RSS feeds, rich citation export options, and sharing on major social networking sites.

Electronic archives created by the D-Scribe Digital Publishing Program include:

- Aphasiology Archive
- Archive of European Integration
- D-Scholarship@Pitt, the Institutional Repository of the University of Pittsburgh, including Electronic Theses and Dissertations (ETDs)
- Industry Studies Working Papers
- Minority Health and Health Equity Archive
- PhilSci-Archive, a preprint repository for the field of Philosophy of Science

== Electronic journal publishing program ==
D-Scribe also contains 40 scholarly journals published by the University Library System (ULS), University of Pittsburgh. Through this program, the ULS works with partners around the world to publish peer-reviewed, international Open Access electronic journals. Services offered include server and software hosting; graphic design services; consultation in editorial workflow management and best practices for electronic publishing; and ISSN and DOI registration. These services are offered free of charge in an effort to incentivize academic journal editors to publish their research results through free and Open Access for researchers worldwide. The ULS also publishes several subscription-based journals under a delayed open access model. The publishing platform is based on Open Journal Systems, free open source software developed by the Public Knowledge Project (PKP). As of 2016, 40 journals are published in this program, including:

- Bolivian Studies Journal
- CINEJ Cinema Journal
- Contemporaneity: Historical Presence in Visual Culture
- EMAJ Emerging Markets Journal
- Etudes Ricoeuriennes/Ricoeur Studies (ERRS)
- Excellence in Higher Education
- Health, Culture and Society
- Hungarian Cultural Studies
- International Journal of Telerehabilitation
- Japanese Language and Literature
- Journal of French and Francophone Philosophy
- Journal of Law and Commerce
- Journal of World-Systems Research
- Ledger, a journal on cryptocurrency and blockchain technology, "the first peer-reviewed journal on Bitcoin"
- Names
- Pittsburgh Journal of Technology Law & Policy
- Pittsburgh Tax Review
- Pennsylvania Libraries: Research and Practice from the Pennsylvania Library Association
- Radical Teacher
- Revista Iberoamericana, a journal of the literature, literary theory, and literary criticism in Latin American Spanish and Portuguese
- The Carl Beck Papers in Russian and East European Studies
- University of Pittsburgh Law Review.

== See also ==
- Project Euclid
