= Erpa =

Erpa may refer to:

- Erie, Pennsylvania, a city of the United States
- Erpa (river), a river of Germany
- Erpa (Cappadocia), a town of ancient Cappadocia
- ERPA, European Research Papers Archive, see Archive of European Integration
