= Betty Friedan =

American feminist writer and activist (1921–2006)

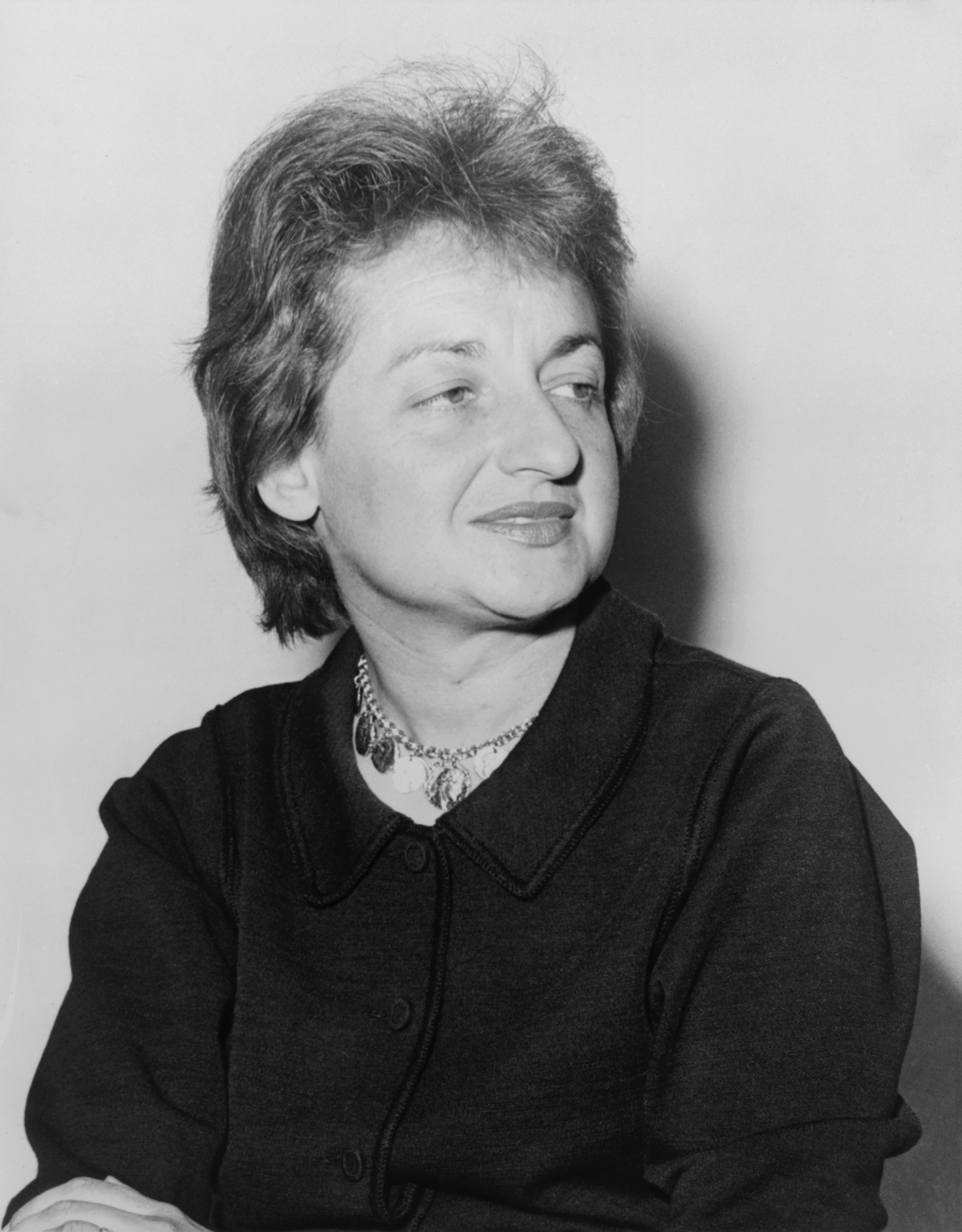
- Friedan in 1960
- Born: Bettye Naomi Goldstein; February 4, 1921; Peoria, Illinois, U.S.
- Died: February 4, 2006 (aged 85); Washington, D.C., U.S.
- Education: Smith College (BA); University of California, Berkeley
- Occupations: Writer; activist
- Notable work: The Feminine Mystique (1963)
- Spouse: Carl Friedan (m. 1947; div. 1969)
- Children: 3, including Daniel

Betty Friedan (/ˈfriːdən, friːˈdæn, frɪ-/; February 4, 1921 – February 4, 2006) was an American feminist writer and activist. A leading figure in the women's movement in the United States, her 1963 book The Feminine Mystique is often credited with sparking the second wave of American feminism in the 20th century. In 1966, Friedan co-founded and was elected the first president of the National Organization for Women (NOW), which aimed to bring women "into the mainstream of American society now [in] fully equal partnership with men."

In 1970, after stepping down as NOW's first president, Friedan organized the nationwide Women's Strike for Equality on August 26, the 50th anniversary of the Nineteenth Amendment to the United States Constitution granting women the right to vote. The national strike was successful beyond expectations in broadening the feminist movement; the march led by Friedan in New York City alone attracted over 50,000 people.

In 1971, Friedan joined other leading feminists to establish the National Women's Political Caucus. Friedan was also a strong supporter of the proposed Equal Rights Amendment to the United States Constitution that passed the House of Representatives (by a vote of 354–24) and Senate (84–8, with 7 not voting) following intense pressure by women's groups led by NOW in the early 1970s. Following Congressional passage of the amendment, Friedan advocated ratification of the amendment in the states and supported other women's rights reforms. She founded the National Association for the Repeal of Abortion Laws but was later critical of the abortion-centered positions of many liberal feminists.

Regarded as an influential author and intellectual in the United States, Friedan remained active in politics and advocacy until the late 1990s, authoring six books. As early as the 1960s Friedan was critical of polarized and extreme factions of feminism that attacked groups such as men and homemakers. One of her later books, The Second Stage (1981), critiqued what Friedan saw as the extremist excesses of some feminists.

== Early life ==
Friedan was born Bettye Naomi Goldstein on February 4, 1921, in Peoria, Illinois, to Harry and Miriam (née Horwitz) Goldstein, whose secular Jewish families were from Russia and Hungary. Harry owned a jewelry store in Peoria, and Miriam wrote for the society page of a newspaper when Friedan's father fell ill. Her mother's new life outside the home seemed much more gratifying.

As a young girl, Friedan was active in both Marxist and Jewish circles; she later wrote how she felt isolated from the latter community at times, and felt her "passion against injustice ... originated from my feelings of the injustice of anti-Semitism". She attended Peoria High School, and became involved in the school newspaper. When her application to write a column was turned down, she and six other friends launched a literary magazine called Tide, which discussed home life rather than school life.

Friedan attended the women's college Smith College in 1938. She won a scholarship prize in her first year for outstanding academic performance. In her second year, she became interested in poetry and had many poems published in campus publications. In 1941, she became editor-in-chief of SCAN (Smith College Associated News). The editorials became more political under her leadership, taking a strong antiwar stance and occasionally causing controversy. She graduated summa cum laude and Phi Beta Kappa in 1942 with a major in psychology. She lived in Chapin House during her time at Smith.

In 1943 she spent a year at the University of California, Berkeley on a fellowship for graduate work in psychology with Erik Erikson. She became more politically active, continuing to mix with Marxists (many of her friends were investigated by the FBI). In her memoirs, she claimed that her boyfriend at the time had pressured her into turning down a Ph.D. fellowship for further study and abandoning her academic career.

== Writing career ==
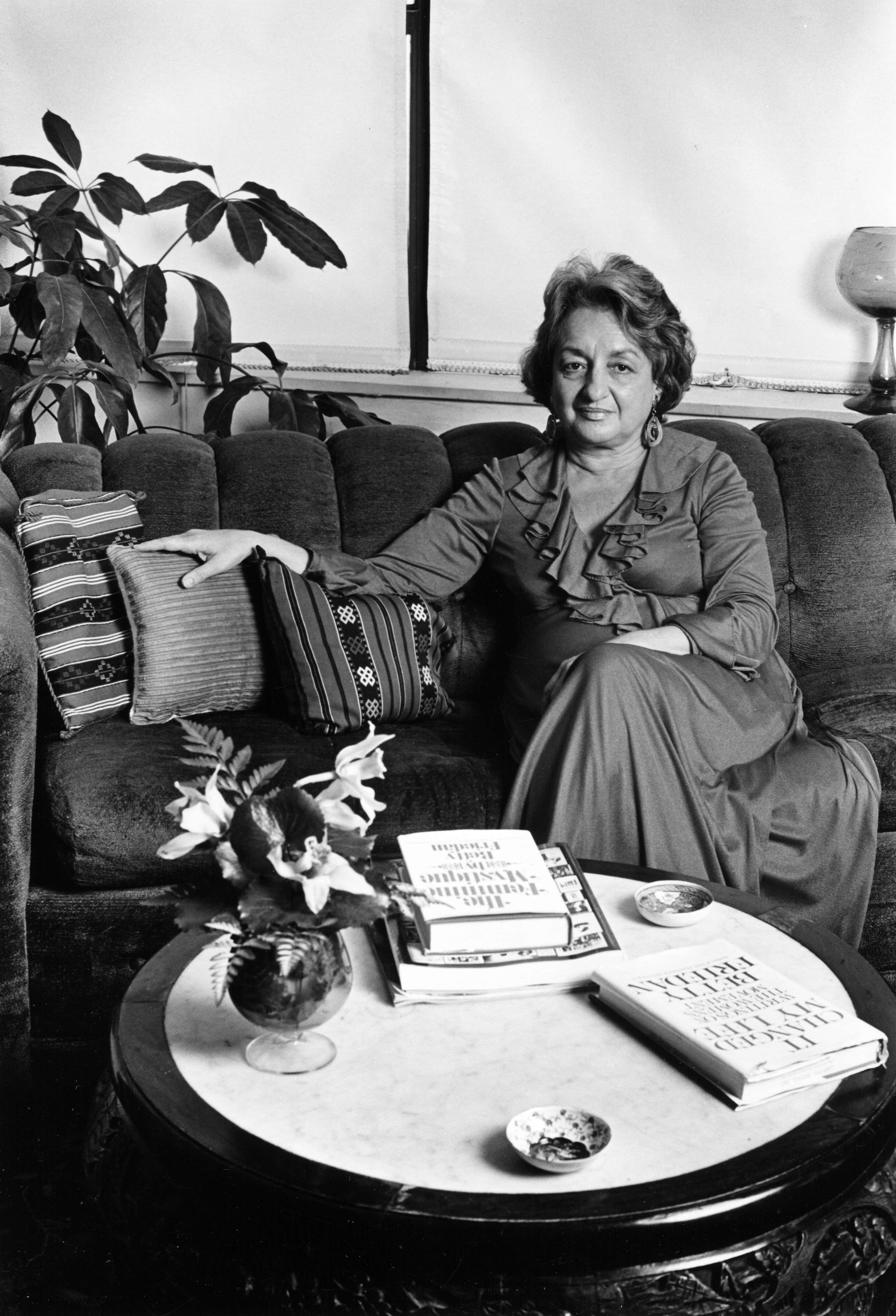
Betty Friedan photographed by Lynn Gilbert, 1981

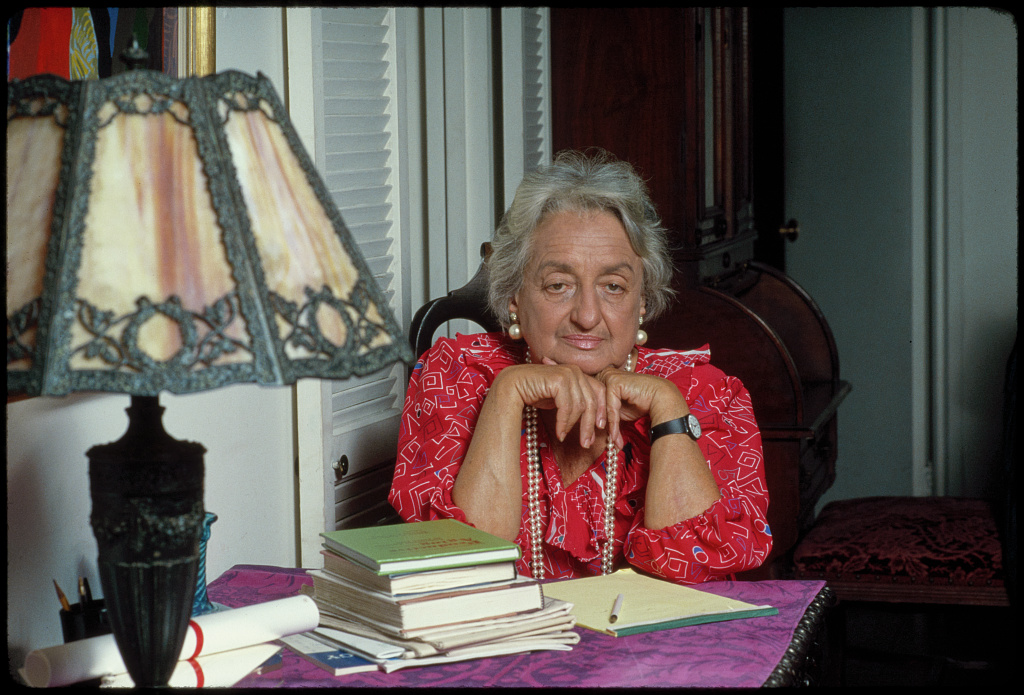
Friedan in 1987

=== Before 1963 ===
After leaving Berkeley, Betty became a journalist for leftist and labor union publications. Between 1943 and 1946 she wrote for Federated Press and between 1946 and 1952 she worked for the United Electrical Workers' UE News. One of her assignments was to report on the House Un-American Activities Committee.

By then married, Friedan was dismissed from the union newspaper UE News in 1952 because she was pregnant with her second child. After leaving UE News she became a freelance writer for various magazines, including Cosmopolitan.

According to Friedan biographer Daniel Horowitz, Friedan started as a labor journalist when she first became aware of women's oppression and exclusion, although Friedan herself disputed this interpretation of her work.

=== The Feminine Mystique ===
For her 15th college reunion in 1957 Friedan conducted a survey of college graduates, focusing on their education, subsequent experiences and satisfaction with their current lives. She started publishing articles about what she called "the problem that has no name", and got passionate responses from many housewives grateful that they were not alone in experiencing this problem.

The shores are strewn with the casualties of the feminine mystique. They did give up their own education to put their husbands through college, and then, maybe against their own wishes, ten or fifteen years later, they were left in the lurch by divorce. The strongest were able to cope more or less well, but it wasn't that easy for a woman of forty-five or fifty to move ahead in a profession and make a new life for herself and her children or herself alone.

Friedan then decided to rework and expand this topic into a book, The Feminine Mystique. Published in 1963, it depicted the roles of women in industrial societies, especially the full-time homemaker role which Friedan deemed stifling. In her book, Friedan described a depressed suburban housewife who dropped out of college at the age of 19 to get married and raise four children. She spoke of her own 'terror' at being alone, wrote that she had never once in her life seen a positive female role-model who worked outside the home and also kept a family, and cited numerous cases of housewives who felt similarly trapped. From her psychological background she criticized Freud's penis envy theory, noting a lot of paradoxes in his work, and offered some answers to women desirous of further education.

The "Problem That Has No Name" was described by Friedan in the beginning of the book:

The problem lay buried, unspoken, for many years in the minds of American women. It was a strange stirring, a sense of dissatisfaction, a yearning [that is, a longing] that women suffered in the middle of the 20th century in the United States. Each suburban [house]wife struggled with it alone. As she made the beds, shopped for groceries ... she was afraid to ask even of herself the silent question – "Is this all?"

Friedan asserted that women are as capable as men for any type of work or any career path against arguments to the contrary by the mass media, educators and psychologists. Her book was important not only because it challenged hegemonic sexism in US society but because it differed from the general emphasis of 19th- and early 20th-century arguments for expanding women's education, political rights, and participation in social movements. While "first-wave" feminists had often shared an essentialist view of women's nature and a corporatist view of society, claiming that women's suffrage, education, and social participation would increase the incidence of marriage, make women better wives and mothers, and improve national and international health and efficiency, Friedan based women's rights in what she called "the basic human need to grow, man's will to be all that is in him to be". The restrictions of the 1950s, and the trapped, imprisoned feeling of many women forced into these roles, spoke to American women who soon began attending consciousness-raising sessions and lobbying for the reform of oppressive laws and social views that restricted females.

The book became a bestseller, which many historians believe was the impetus for the "second wave" of the women's movement in the United States, and significantly shaped national and world events.

Friedan originally intended to write a sequel to The Feminine Mystique, which was to be called Woman: The Fourth Dimension, but instead wrote only an article by that title, which appeared in the Ladies' Home Journal in June 1964.

=== Other works ===
External videos
- Booknotes interview with Friedan on The Fountain of Age, November 28, 1993, C-SPAN

Friedan published six books. Her other books include The Second Stage, It Changed My Life: Writings on the Women's Movement, Beyond Gender and The Fountain of Age. Her autobiography, Life so Far, was published in 2000.

She also wrote for magazines and a newspaper:

- Columns in McCall's magazine, 1971–1974
- Writings for The New York Times Magazine, Newsday, Harper's, Saturday Review, Mademoiselle, Ladies' Home Journal, Family Circle, TV Guide, and True.

== Activism in the women's movement ==
=== National Organization for Women ===
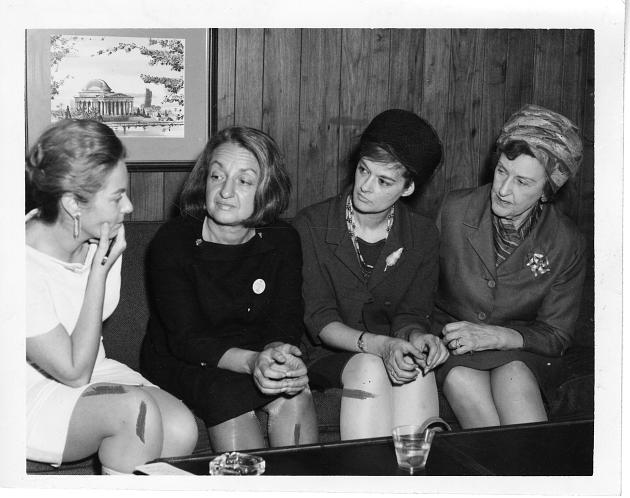
Billington, Friedan, Ireton, and Rawalt

In 1966 Friedan co-founded, and became the first president of the National Organization for Women. Some of the founders of NOW, including Friedan, were inspired by the failure of the Equal Employment Opportunity Commission to enforce Title VII of the Civil Rights Act of 1964; at the Third National Conference of State Commissions on the Status of Women they were prohibited from issuing a resolution that recommended the EEOC carry out its legal mandate to end sex discrimination in employment. They thus gathered in Friedan's hotel room to form a new organization. On a paper napkin Friedan scribbled the acronym "NOW". Later more people became founders of NOW at the October 1966 NOW Organizing Conference. Friedan, with Pauli Murray, wrote NOW's statement of purpose; the original was scribbled on a napkin by Friedan. Under Friedan, NOW fiercely advocated the legal equality of women and men.

NOW lobbied for enforcement of Title VII of the Civil Rights Act of 1964 and the Equal Pay Act of 1963, the first two major legislative victories of the movement, and forced the Equal Employment Opportunity Commission to stop ignoring, and start treating with dignity and urgency, claims filed involving sex discrimination. They successfully campaigned for a 1967 Executive Order extending the same affirmative action granted to Black people to women, and for a 1968 EEOC decision ruling illegal sex-segregated help want ads, later upheld by the Supreme Court. NOW was vocal in support of the legalization of abortion, an issue that divided some feminists. Also divisive in the 1960s among women was the Equal Rights Amendment, which NOW fully endorsed; by the 1970s, women and labor unions opposed to ERA warmed up to it and began to support it fully. NOW also lobbied for national daycare.

NOW also helped women get equal access to public places, which they sometimes did not have. For example, by the early 1950s, women were allowed inside the Oak Room and Bar during the evenings, but still barred until 3 p.m. on weekdays, while the stock exchanges operated. In February 1969, Friedan and other members of NOW held a sit-in and then picketed to protest this; the gender restriction was removed a few months later.

Despite the success NOW achieved under Friedan, her decision to pressure Equal Employment Opportunity to use Title VII of the 1964 Civil Rights Act to enforce more job opportunities among American women met with fierce opposition within the organization. Siding with arguments from the group's African American members, many of NOW's leaders accepted that the vast number of male and female African Americans who lived below the poverty line needed more job opportunities than women within the middle and upper class. Friedan stepped down as president in 1969.

In 1973, Friedan founded the First Women's Bank and Trust Company.

=== Women's Strike for Equality ===
In 1970 NOW, with Friedan leading the cause, was instrumental in the U.S. Senate's rejection of President Richard M. Nixon's Supreme Court nominee G. Harrold Carswell, who had opposed the 1964 Civil Rights Act granting (among other things) women workplace equality with men. On August 26, 1970, the 50th anniversary of the Women's Suffrage Amendment to the Constitution, Friedan organized the national Women's Strike for Equality, and led a march of an estimated 20,000 women in New York City. While the march's primary objective was promoting equal opportunities for women in jobs and education, protestors and organizers of the event also demanded abortion rights and the establishment of child-care centers.

Friedan spoke about the Strike for Equality:

All kinds of women's groups all over the country will be using this week on August 26 particularly, to point out those areas in women's life which are still not addressed. For example, a question of equality before the law; we are interested in the equal rights amendment. The question of child care centers which are totally inadequate in the society, and which women require, if they are going to assume their rightful position in terms of helping in decisions of the society. The question of a women's right to control her own reproductive processes, that is, laws prohibiting abortion in the state or putting them into criminal statutes; I think that would be a statute that we would [be] addressing ourselves to.

So I think individual women will react differently; some will not cook that day, some will engage in dialog with their husband[s], some will be out at the rallies and demonstrations that will be taking place all over the country. Others will be writing things that will help them to define where they want to go. Some will be pressuring their Senators and their Congressmen to pass legislations that affect women. I don't think you can come up with any one point, women will be doing their own thing in their own way.

=== National Association for the Repeal of Abortion Laws ===
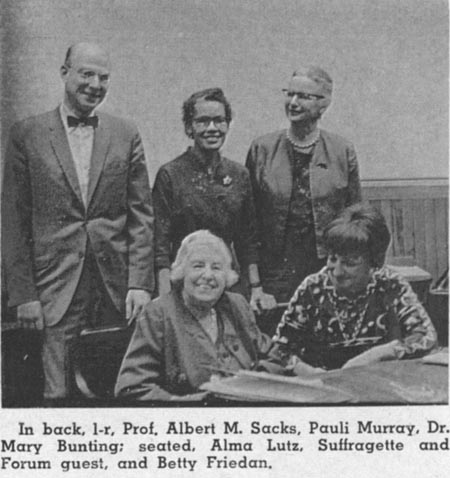
Rear, L to R, Prof. Albert M. Sacks, Pauli Murray, Dr. Mary Bunting; Seated, L to R, Alma Lutz, suffragette and Harvard Law School Forum Guest, and Betty Friedan

Friedan founded the National Association for the Repeal of Abortion Laws, renamed National Abortion Rights Action League after the Supreme Court had legalized abortion in 1973.

=== Politics ===
In 1970 Friedan led other feminists in derailing the nomination of Supreme Court nominee G. Harrold Carswell, whose record of racial discrimination and antifeminism made him unacceptable and unfit to sit on the highest court in the land to virtually everyone in the civil rights and feminist movements. Friedan's impassioned testimony before the Senate helped sink Carswell's nomination.

In 1971 Friedan, along with many other leading women's movement leaders, including Gloria Steinem (with whom she had a legendary rivalry) founded the National Women's Political Caucus.

In 1972, Friedan unsuccessfully ran as a delegate to the 1972 Democratic National Convention in support of Congresswoman Shirley Chisholm. That year at the DNC Friedan played a very prominent role and addressed the convention, although she clashed with other women, notably Steinem, on what should be done there, and how.

=== Movement image and unity ===
One of the most influential feminists of the twentieth century, Friedan (in addition to many others) opposed equating feminism with lesbianism. As early as 1964, very early in the movement, and only a year after the publication of The Feminine Mystique, Friedan appeared on television to address the fact the media was, at that point, trying to dismiss the movement as a joke and centering argument and debate around whether or not to wear bras and other issues considered ridiculous. In 1982, after the second wave, she wrote a book for the post-feminist 1980s called The Second Stage, about family life, premised on women having conquered social and legal obstacles.

She pushed the feminist movement to focus on economic issues, especially equality in employment and business as well as provision for child care and other means by which both women and men could balance family and work. She tried to lessen the focuses on abortion, as an issue already won, and on rape and pornography, which she believed most women did not consider to be high priorities.

=== Related issues ===
==== Lesbian politics ====
When she grew up in Peoria, Illinois, she knew only one gay man. She said, "the whole idea of homosexuality made me profoundly uneasy." She later acknowledged that she had been very square, and was uncomfortable about homosexuality. "The women's movement was not about sex, but about equal opportunity in jobs and all the rest of it. Yes, I suppose you have to say that freedom of sexual choice is part of that, but it shouldn't be the main issue". (Note: On equal opportunity in jobs: equal opportunity employment, access to jobs without suffering discrimination on certain grounds.) (Note: On freedom of sexual choice: human female sexuality#Feminist views, how feminism addresses a wide range of sexual issues.) She ignored lesbians in the National Organization for Women (NOW) initially, and objected to what she saw as their demands for equal time. While President of NOW, Friedan coined the term "lavender menace" during a meeting in 1969. She voiced this opinion while claiming that lesbians and homosexuality were a "threat to the feminist movement." "Homosexuality ... is not, in my opinion, what the women's movement is all about." While opposing all repression, she wrote, she refused to wear a purple armband as an act of political solidarity, considering it not part of the mainstream issues of abortion and child care.

But in 1977, at the National Women's Conference, she seconded a lesbian rights resolution "which everyone thought I would oppose" in order to "preempt any debate" and move on to other issues she believed were more important and less divisive in the effort to add the Equal Rights Amendment (ERA) to the U.S. Constitution. She accepted lesbian sexuality, albeit not its politicization. In 1995, at the United Nations Fourth World Conference on Women in Beijing, China, she found advice given by Chinese authorities to taxi drivers that naked lesbians would be "cavorting" in their cars so that the drivers should hang sheets outside their cab windows, and that lesbians would have AIDS and so drivers should carry disinfectants, to be "ridiculous", "incredibly stupid" and "insulting". In 1997, she wrote that "children ... will ideally come from mother and father." She wrote in 2000, "I'm more relaxed about the whole issue now."

In 2022 the board of trustees of the Peoria Public Schools school district considered renaming Washington Gifted School after Friedan, but a board member brought up comments by Friedan perceived to be discriminatory against LGBT people, and so another name, Reservoir Gifted Academy, was chosen for the school.

==== Abortion choice ====
She supported the concept that abortion is a woman's choice, that it shouldn't be a crime or exclusively a doctor's choice or anyone else involved, and helped form NARAL (now NARAL Pro-Choice America) at a time when Planned Parenthood wasn't yet supportive. Alleged death threats against her speaking on abortion led to the cancellation of two events, although subsequently one of the host institutions, Loyola College, invited her back to speak on abortion and other homosexual rights issues and she did so. Her draft of NOW's first statement of purpose included an abortion plank, but NOW didn't include it until the next year.

In 1980, she believed abortion should be in the context of "the choice to have children", a formulation supported by the Roman Catholic priest organizing Catholic participation in the White House Conference on Families for that year, though perhaps not by the bishops above him. A resolution embodying the formulation passed at the conference by 460 to 114, whereas a resolution addressing abortion, ERA and "sexual preference" passed by only 292–291 and that only after 50 opponents of abortion had walked out and so hadn't voted on it. She disagreed with a resolution that framed abortion in more feminist terms that was introduced in the Minneapolis regional conference resulting from the same White House Conference on Families, believing it to be more polarizing, while the drafters apparently thought Friedan's formulation too conservative.

As of 2000, she wrote, referring to "NOW and the other women's organizations" as seeming to be in a "time warp", "to my mind, there is far too much focus on abortion. ... [I]n recent years I've gotten a little uneasy about the movement's narrow focus on abortion as if it were the single, all-important issue for women when it's not." She asked, "Why don't we join forces with all who have true reverence for life, including Catholics who oppose abortion, and fight for the choice to have children?"

==== Pornography ====
She joined nearly 200 others in Feminists for Free Expression in opposing the Pornography Victims' Compensation Act. "To suppress free speech in the name of protecting women is dangerous and wrong," said Friedan. "Even some blue-jean ads are insulting and denigrating. I'm not adverse to a boycott, but I don't think they should be suppressed."

==== War ====
In 1968, Friedan signed the "Writers and Editors War Tax Protest" pledge, vowing to refuse tax payments in protest against the Vietnam War.

==== Gun violence ====
Friedan cofounded Women Against Gun Violence with Ann Reiss Lane in 1994.

== Influence ==
Friedan is credited for starting the contemporary feminist movement and writing a book that is one of the cornerstones of American feminism. Her activist work and her book The Feminine Mystique have been a critical influence to authors, educators, writers, anthropologists, journalists, activists, organizations, unions, and everyday women taking part in the feminist movement. Allan Wolf, in The Mystique of Betty Friedan writes: "She helped to change not only the thinking but the lives of many American women, but recent books throw into question the intellectual and personal sources of her work." Although there have been some debates on Friedan's work in The Feminine Mystique since its publication, there is no doubt that her work for equality for women was sincere and committed.

Judith Hennessee (Betty Friedan: Her Life) and Daniel Horowitz, a professor of American Studies at Smith College, have also written about Friedan. Horowitz explored Friedan's engagement with the women's movement before she began to work on The Feminine Mystique and pointed out that Friedan's feminism did not start in the 1950s but even earlier, in the 1940s. Focusing his study on Friedan's ideas in feminism rather than on her personal life Horowitz's book gave Friedan a major role in the history of American feminism.

Justine Blau was also greatly influenced by Friedan. In Betty Friedan: Feminist Blau wrote of the feminist movement's influence on Friedan's personal and professional life. Lisa Fredenksen Bohannon, in Woman's work: The story of Betty Friedan, went deep into Friedan's personal life and wrote about her relationship with her mother. Sandra Henry and Emily Taitz (Betty Friedan, Fighter for Woman's Rights) and Susan Taylor Boyd (Betty Friedan: Voice of Woman's Right, Advocates of Human Rights), wrote biographies on Friedan's life and works. Journalist Janann Sheman wrote a book called Interviews with Betty Friedan containing interviews with Friedan for The New York Times, Working Women and Playboy, among others. Focusing on interviews that relate to Friedan's views on men, women and the American Family, Sheman traced Friedan's life with an analysis of The Feminine Mystique.

Friedan (among others) was featured in the 2013 documentary Makers: Women Who Make America, about the women's movement.

In 2014, a biography of Friedan was added to the American National Biography Online (ANB).

== Personality ==
The New York Times obituary for Friedan noted that she was "famously abrasive", and that she could be "thin-skinned and imperious, subject to screaming fits of temperament".

Media focus would fall on feminists grading each other on personality and appearance, the source of Betty Friedan and Gloria Steinem's well-documented antipathy. In February 2006, shortly after Friedan's death, the feminist writer Germaine Greer published an article in The Guardian, in which she described Friedan as pompous and egotistic, somewhat demanding and sometimes selfish, citing several incidents during a 1972 tour of Iran.

Betty Friedan "changed the course of human history almost single-handedly." Her ex-husband, Carl Friedan, believes this; Betty believed it too. This belief was the key to a good deal of Betty's behaviour; she would become breathless with outrage if she didn't get the deference she thought she deserved. Though her behaviour was often tiresome, I figured that she had a point. Women don't get the respect they deserve unless they are wielding male-shaped power; if they represent women they will be called "love" and expected to clear up after themselves. Betty wanted to change that forever.

— Germaine Greer, "The Betty I Knew", The Guardian (February 7, 2006)

Indeed, Carl Friedan had been quoted as saying "She changed the course of history almost singlehandedly. It took a driven, super aggressive, egocentric, almost lunatic dynamo to rock the world the way she did. Unfortunately, she was that same person at home, where that kind of conduct doesn't work. She simply never understood this."

Writer Camille Paglia, who had been denounced by Friedan in a Playboy interview, wrote a brief obituary for her in Entertainment Weekly:

Betty Friedan wasn't afraid to be called abrasive. She pursued her feminist principles with a flamboyant pugnacity that has become all too rare in these yuppified times. She hated girliness and bourgeois decorum, and never lost her earthly ethnicity.

— Camille Paglia, December 29, 2006/January 5, 2007 double End of the Year issue, section Farewell, pg. 94

The truth is that I've always been a bad-tempered bitch. Some people say that I have mellowed some. I don't know.

— Betty Friedan, Life So Far

The only way for a woman, as for a man, to find herself, to know herself as a person, is by creative work of her own.

— Betty Friedan, The Feminine Mystique

== Personal life ==
She married Carl Friedan (né Friedman), a theater producer, in 1947 while working at UE News. She continued to work after marriage; first as a paid employee and, after 1952, as a freelance journalist. The couple divorced in May 1969, and Carl died in December 2005.

Friedan stated in her memoir Life So Far (2000) that Carl had beaten her during their marriage; friends such as Dolores Alexander recalled having to cover up black eyes from Carl's abuse in time for press conferences (Brownmiller 1999, p. 70). Carl denied abusing her in an interview with Time magazine shortly after the book was published, describing the claim as a "complete fabrication". She later said, on Good Morning America, "I almost wish I hadn't even written about it, because it's been sensationalized out of context. My husband was not a wife-beater, and I was no passive victim of a wife-beater. We fought a lot, and he was bigger than me."

Carl and Betty Friedan had three children, Daniel, Emily and Jonathan. She was raised in a Jewish family, but was an agnostic. (Note: "As an agnostic Jew many of whose Jewish friends had become Unitarians, she arranged a Bar Mitzvah celebration for Daniel.") In 1973, Friedan was one of the signers of the Humanist Manifesto II.

By the mid-1980s, Friedan participated in a monthly Torah study group and described a connection between her feminism and Judaism, saying that pride in her identity as a woman had also deepened her pride in her Jewish identity.

== Death ==
Friedan died of congestive heart failure at her home in Washington, D.C., on February 4, 2006, her 85th birthday. (Note: "Betty Friedan, the feminist crusader and author whose searing first book, The Feminine Mystique, ignited the contemporary women's movement in 1963 and as a result permanently transformed the social fabric of the United States and countries around the world, died yesterday, her 85th birthday, at her home in Washington. The cause was congestive heart failure, said Emily Bazelon, a family spokeswoman. ... For decades a familiar presence on television and the lecture circuit, Ms. Friedan, with her short stature and deeply hooded eyes, looked for much of her adult life like a 'combination of Hermione Gingold and Bette Davis,' as Judy Klemesrud wrote in The New York Times Magazine in 1970.")

== Papers ==
Some of Friedan's papers are held at the Schlesinger Library, Radcliffe Institute, Harvard University, Cambridge, Massachusetts.

== Awards and honors ==
- Honorary doctorate of humane letters from Smith College (1975)
- Humanist of the Year from the American Humanist Association (1975)
- Mort Weisinger Award from the American Society of Journalists and Authors (1979)
- From 1981 to 1983, Bonnie Tiburzi put on three "Women of Accomplishment" luncheons for the Wings Club honoring certain women, including Friedan.
- Honorary doctorate of humane letters from the State University at Stony Brook (1985)
- Eleanor Roosevelt Leadership Award (1989)
- Honorary doctorate of humane letters from Bradley University (1991)
- Induction into the National Women's Hall of Fame (1993)
- Honorary doctorate of letters from Columbia University (1994)
- "The 75 Most Important Women of the Past 75 Years" – Glamour magazine listed Friedan as one of them (2014)

== In media ==
Friedan was portrayed by actress Tracey Ullman in the 2020 FX limited series Mrs. America.

Friedan was portrayed by Tracee Chimo in Season 1, Episode 7 "Foie Gras" of the HBO Max series Julia. The scene, which takes place at a Public Television gala in New York, depicts a conversation between Friedan and Julia Child, in which Friedan criticizes Child's cooking show on WGBH, suggesting that it harms women.

A fictionalized version of her was a character in the Britney Spears jukebox musical Once Upon a One More Time as the 'Original Fairy Godmother' who gives the fairytale princesses 'The Feminine Mystique' to empower themselves. In the show, she is a fairy godmother who was banished from the fairytales and went to live in Flatbush to publish the book.

Friedan herself appeared in two films, including Camera Three and Happily Ever After: Fairy Tails for Every Child, in 1955 and 1995 respectively. She also narrated two television shows, "Ex Libris" and "Bicentennial Minutes".

== Books ==
- The Feminine Mystique (1963)
- It Changed My Life: Writings on the Women's Movement (1976)
- The Second Stage (1981)
- The Fountain of Age (1993)
- Beyond Gender (1997)
- Life So Far (2000)

== See also ==
- List of women's rights activists

== Notes ==
Preceded by (none)	President of the National Organization for Women; 1966–1970	Succeeded by Aileen Hernandez
