= Jackie Smith (sociologist) =

Sociology professor (born 1968)

Jackie Smith (born April 3, 1968) is an American sociologist. She specializes in Political economy and Transnational organization social movements. Since 2011, she has been Professor of Sociology at the University of Pittsburgh. Smith currently serves as editor of the Journal of World-Systems Research, an official journal of the American Sociological Association and published by the University Library System, University of Pittsburgh. She is an advocate for the Open Access movement, arguing that scholarly societies should consider publishing options beyond those of major publishers. She is a leading advocate for building the Human Rights City worldwide movement.

She received her PhD from the University of Notre Dame in 1996. From 1997 to 2005, she was a professor at the Department of Sociology at the State University of New York. In 2005, she became an associate professor of Sociology and Peace Studies at the University of Notre Dame and a faculty member at the Kroc Institute for International Peace Studies. From 2008 to 2009, she directed the Center for the Study of Social Movements and Social Change.

She has published numerous articles, and published chapters and edited numerous books.

== Selected works ==
- Jackie Smith; Ernesto Verdeja (June 15, 2013). Globalization, Social Movements, and Peacebuilding. Syracuse University Press. ISBN 978-0-8156-3321-1.
- Jackie Smith; Dawn Wiest (January 2012). Social Movements in the World-System: The Politics of Crisis and Transformation. Russell Sage. ISBN 978-0-87154-812-2.
- Jackie Smith (April 1, 2010). Social Movements for Global Democracy. JHU Press. ISBN 978-0-8018-9686-6.
- Marina Karides; Jackie Smith; Marc Becker (2008). Global democracy and the World Social Forums. Paradigm Publishers. ISBN 978-1-59451-420-3.
- Joe Bandy; Jackie Smith (2005). Coalitions across borders: transnational protest and the neoliberal order. Rowman & Littlefield. ISBN 978-0-7425-2396-8.
- Jackie Smith; Charles Chatfield; Ron Pagnucco (1997). Transnational social movements and global politics: solidarity beyond the state. Syracuse University Press. ISBN 978-0-8156-2742-5.
- Ron Pagnucco; Jackie Smith; John T. Crist (1992). Social Movement Theory and the Comparative Study of Nonviolent Collective Action. Joan B. Kroc Institute for International Peace Studies.
