= AEI =

AEI may refer to:

- Adelaide Educational Institution of South Australia
- Aei Latin-script trigraph
- AEI Music Network Inc. (Audio Environments Incorporated), which created the "Foreground Music" industry in 1971
- Albert Einstein Institute, the Max Planck Institute for Gravitational Physics, Germany
- Albert Einstein Institution, an organisation involved in non-violent methods of political resistance based in the US
- Alliance for European Integration, the ruling coalition in Moldova since the July 2009 election
- American Enterprise Institute, a conservative think tank
- Architectural Engineering Institute
- Archive of European Integration
- Associated Electrical Industries, large company in the UK (now defunct)
- Automatic Equipment Identification, as used by the railroad industry
- Average Earnings Index, British labour market measure
- Average Earnings Index (horse racing), American horse racing measure
- Atomic Energy Organization
- State Research Agency, a Spanish state agency responsible for the promotion of scientific and technical research

== See also ==
- EAI (disambiguation)
