= Second stage =

Second stage may refer to

== Spaceflight ==
- The second stage of a multistage rocket
  - Delta Cryogenic Second Stage
  - Falcon 1 second-stage
  - S-II second stage
  - Short nozzle second stage

== Other uses ==
- Second Stage Theater, theatre company in New York City
- Mariinsky Theatre Second Stage, second part of a theatre complex in Saint Petersburg, Russia
- The Second Stage, 1981 book by Betty Friedan
- Second Stage Lensmen, 1953 science fiction novel by author Edward E. Smith
- Second stage manufacturer, company that installs equipment to complete a vehicle
