= Journal of Law and Commerce =

- Discipline: Commercial law
- Language: English
- Edited by: George Balchunas

Publication details
- History: 1980–present
- Publisher: D-Scribe Digital Publishing for the University of Pittsburgh School of Law (United States)
- Frequency: Biannual

Standard abbreviations
- Bluebook: J.L. & Com.
- ISO 4: J. Law Commer.

Indexing
- ISSN: 0733-2491
- LCCN: 82643290
- OCLC no.: 7942474

Links
- Journal homepage

The Journal of Law and Commerce is a law review published by an independent student group at the University of Pittsburgh School of Law, focusing on domestic and international commercial and business law. The journal is published biannually, with recent issues available online. The journal is published by the University Library System at the University of Pittsburgh as part of its D-Scribe Digital Publishing program.

Founded in 1980, the journal's focus on commercial, business, tax, and corporate law reflects the law school's interests in those areas. The journal dedicates a portion of each volume to issues regarding the United Nations Convention on Contracts for the International Sale of Goods. Due to the international nature of this research, the journal translates these issues into several languages.

== Notable contributors ==
- E. Allan Farnsworth
- John E. Murray, Jr.
- Dick Thornburgh
- William Edward Sell
- Ruggero J. Aldisert
- Anita Hill
