= Pittsburgh Journal of Technology Law & Policy =

- Discipline: Technology law
- Language: English
- Edited by: Dana Morrison

Publication details
- History: 2000-present
- Publisher: University Library System, University of Pittsburgh (United States)
- Frequency: Biannually
- Open access: Yes

Standard abbreviations
- Bluebook: Pitt. J. Tech. L. & Pol'y
- ISO 4: Pittsburgh J. Technol. Law Policy

Indexing
- ISSN: 2164-800X
- OCLC no.: 50605066

Links
- Journal homepage; Online access

The Pittsburgh Journal of Technology Law & Policy is a biannual law review covering legal topics involving intellectual property and technology.

== Description ==
This journal is published by an independent student group at the University of Pittsburgh School of Law, with recent issues available open access online.

It is also published by the Hillman Library as part of the D-Scribe Digital Publishing Program in conjunction with the University of Pittsburgh Press.
