= EAI =

EAI may refer to:

== Organisations ==
- East Asia Institute (Korea), an independent, private think tank
- East Asia Institute (Ludwigshafen), Germany, a public research centre, part of the Ludwigshafen University of Applied Sciences
- Electronic Arts Intermix, an American art organization
- Electronic Associates, Inc., an American analog computer manufacturer
- Element AI, a former Canadian artificial intelligence company
- Engineering Animation, Inc., a defunct American visualization software company
- Excalibur Almaz Inc., former name of Manx private spaceflight company now called Excalibur Almaz Limited

== Other uses ==
- Electroacoustic improvisation, a form of free improvisation in music, formerly known as live electronics
- Email address internationalization, the move to standardise email addresses globally
- Enterprise application integration, the use of software and computer systems' architectural principles to integrate a set of enterprise computer applications
- Erythema ab igne, a skin condition caused by long-term exposure to heat

== See also ==
- AEI (disambiguation)
- Weatherhead East Asian Institute (WEAI), a community of scholars at Columbia University
