= The Fountain of Age =

The Fountain of Age is a book written by Betty Friedan, who also wrote The Feminine Mystique. It is a study of aging and how people face aging.
