= University of Pittsburgh Law Review =

- Discipline: Law review
- Language: English
- Edited by: Alec Bosnic

Publication details
- History: 1934 to present
- Publisher: University Library System, University of Pittsburgh (United States)
- Frequency: Quarterly
- Open access: Yes
- License: Creative Commons Attribution Non-Commercial No Derivatives

Standard abbreviations
- Bluebook: U. Pitt. L. Rev.
- ISO 4: Univ. Pittsburgh Law Rev.

Indexing
- ISSN: 0041-9915

Links
- Journal homepage

The University of Pittsburgh Law Review is a journal of legal scholarship edited by an independent student group at University of Pittsburgh School of Law and published by the D-Scribe Digital Publishing program at the University Library System, University of Pittsburgh. The Review is published quarterly, with recent issues available online. It is one of the 40 most-cited law reviews in the country. As of 2006, the Review received the 34th most submissions of all Law Reviews.

The University of Pittsburgh Law Review was founded in 1934, with a staff of nine. The first volume was published in March 1935, and by that fall, the staff had doubled and publication increased to four times per year. The Review occasionally sponsors a symposium at the law school, featuring speakers reflecting on topics including the 50th anniversary of Brown v. Board of Education and "Lawyers and Disability." The Law Review's 75th Volume featured a Symposium edition dedicated to the legacy of alumnus Derrick Bell. In October 2017, the Law Review organized a conference titled "Judges and Journalists: Accuracy and Access."
