= Fred Wright (cartoonist) =

American labor cartoonist (1907–1984)

- Fred Wright
- Born: June 24, 1907; Derby, England
- Died: December 29, 1984 (aged 77)
- Occupation: cartoonist
- Years active: 1939–1984
- Spouse: Patricia (m. 1939)

Fred Wright (June 24, 1907 – December 29, 1984) was an American labor cartoonist who created thousands of illustrated news strips, along with posters, leaflets, and strike placards, while working for the United Electrical, Radio and Machine Workers of America (UE). He started getting his cartoons published in the late 1930s in the National Maritime Union newspaper, The Pilot. In 1949 the UE hired him as its staff cartoonist, and he remained with the UE until his death in 1984.

== Early life ==
Wright was born in June 1907 in Derby, England. As a young child, he emigrated with his family to the U.S. He learned to draw from his grandfather, an amateur artist who worked as a striper in automobile factories. During his late teenage years, Wright began to play saxophone professionally in clip joints and resorts. He also took courses at the Art Students League of New York from the socialist painter John Sloan, whose work often depicted poverty-stricken urban neighborhoods.

According to Paul Buhle, Wright was "truly radicalized" by the Great Depression. While working as a saxophonist on cruise ships in the Caribbean, he met National Maritime Union (NMU) organizers who taught him a labor-oriented worldview. He was said to have been affected by "the deplorable conditions and injustices he observed in the West Indian colonies".

== Cartoonist ==
Wright sold his first cartoon in 1936, and soon thereafter regularly had his work published in NMU's newspaper, The Pilot. During World War II, he drew cartoons for the U.S. Army.

After being hired as the UE staff cartoonist in 1949, Wright developed the cartooning style he is best known for. In Paul Buhle's characterization, Wright's work "heralded the abandonment of the symbolic proletarian muscular giant in favor of a more workaday Joe (or Jane) fighting back against inflation, automation, and employer attacks", while his "Art Young-type philosophical approach to the difficulties of modern existence transcended socialist and class clichés without ... losing ... basic points of unfairness and exploitation."

In a book about post-WWII satire in the U.S., Stephen Kercher said that Wright

used cartoons as sharp rejoinders to the Taft-Hartley Act, McCarthyism, and other postwar onslaughts against the American labor movement. Although class-conscious, prolabor cartooning left virtually no trace in mainstream publications in the two decades following World War II, the work of Wright ... circulated widely (through Federated Press syndication) in scores of local union publications.

Besides appearing frequently in UE's newspaper, the UE News, Wright's cartoons were printed on occasion in leftist publications such as the National Guardian and Monthly Review.

Over the decades, Wright's cartoons and caricatures were collected in anthologies published by the UE. He also penned a presidential campaign satire, The Goldwater Coloring Book, which came out during the run-up to the 1964 U.S. presidential election. He experimented with early animated films, and created labor's first anti-Vietnam War cartoons in the 1960s.

As an instance of his union cartooning, he assisted a May 1982 strike by electrical workers at the UE-represented Morse Cutting Tools plant in New Bedford, Massachusetts. The plant was owned by Gulf and Western Industries. According to The New York Times, "New Bedford shops were papered with posters by Fred Wright.... The posters depicted Morse as a cow being milked by Gulf & Western."

== Death ==
Wright died of cancer on December 29, 1984. At the time, he was creating a cartoon history of the Industrial Revolution.

== Legacy ==
Gary Huck, Wright's successor as UE cartoonist, said that contrary to the dark, realistic "ash can style" of drawing that was still prevalent in the 1930s and '40s, Wright was "one of the first cartoonists in America to introduce more of a cartoony style to political cartoons and place a big emphasis on humor, keeping in mind that none of the politics are diminished." In 1989, John Nichols of The Blade described Wright as the "father of modern labor cartooning". Buhle labeled Wright the second-most widely published labor cartoonist after Art Young.

== Works ==
- Cartoons for Shop Papers: Catalogue. New York: United Electrical, Radio and Machine Workers of America. 1939. OCLC 890315854.
- Frankly, Sir, I Need More Money!. New York: United Electrical, Radio and Machine Workers of America. 1948. OCLC 13682905. Co-authored with William Cahn.
- Okay ... BLOW!. New York: United Electrical, Radio and Machine Workers of America. 1950. OCLC 32529879.
- The Goldwater Coloring Book. New York: Marzani & Munsell, Inc. 1964. OCLC 14005938.
- So Long, Partner!. New York: United Electrical, Radio and Machine Workers of America. 1975. OCLC 979928008.
- Celebrating 50 years of Democratic, Rank & File Trade Unionism: 1986 calendar. New York: United Electrical, Radio and Machine Workers of America. 1985. OCLC 37181773. "Illustrated by and dedicated to the memory of Fred Wright."
