= Christopher Chase-Dunn =

American sociologist (born 1944)

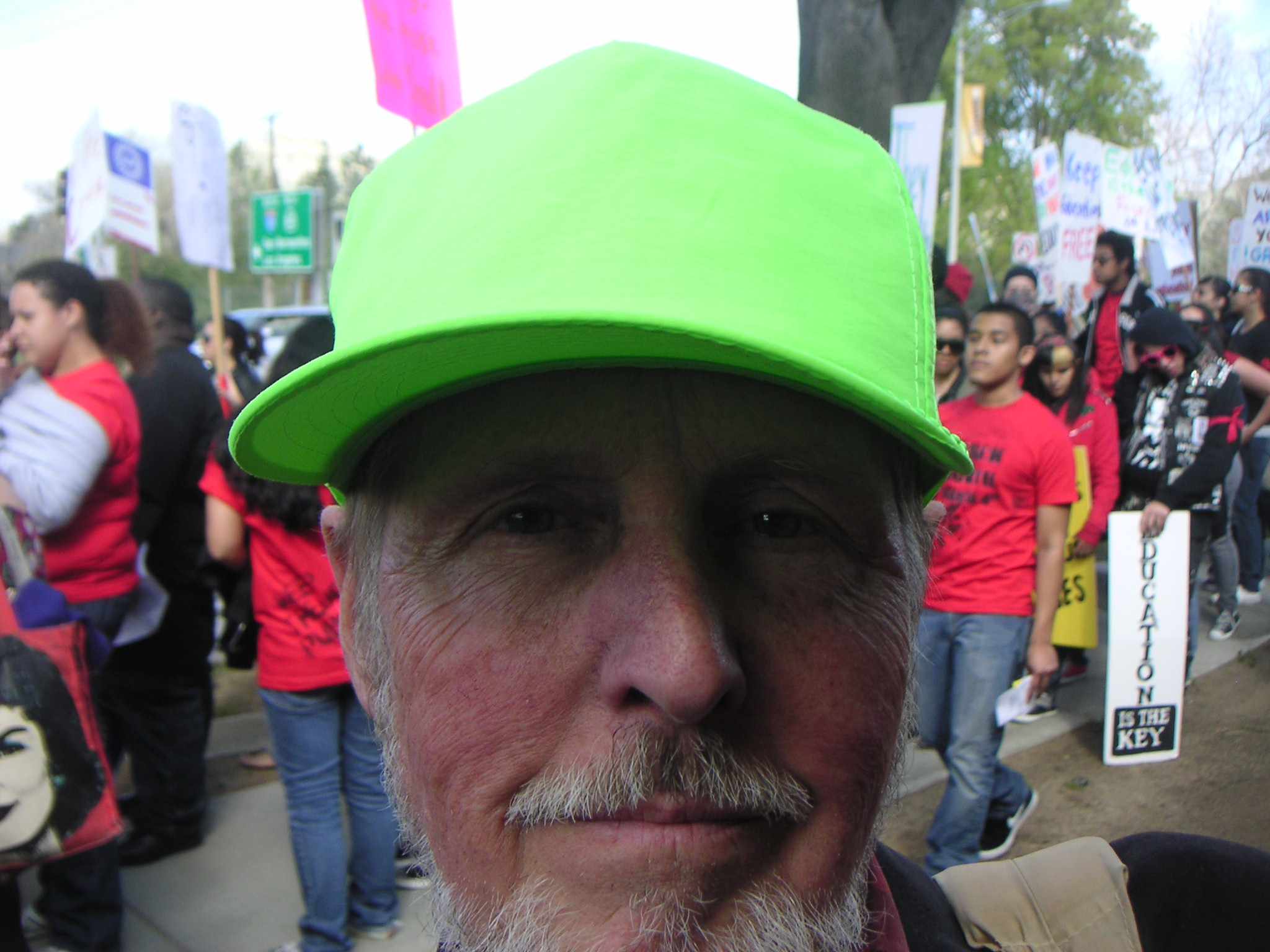
- Christopher Chase-Dunn
- Born: January 10, 1944 (age 82); Corvallis, Oregon, U.S.

Academic work
- School or tradition: World-systems
- Main interests: Systems theory, world-systems, sociology
- Notable works: Global Formation: Structures of The World-Economy (1991)

Christopher K. Chase-Dunn (born January 10, 1944, Corvallis, Oregon) is an American sociologist best known for his contributions to world-systems theory.

== Education and career ==
Chase-Dunn earned his PhD in 1975 at Stanford University (studying under John W. Meyer) and has taught at The Johns Hopkins University (1975–2000) and at the University of California, Riverside (2000–present). He is a Fellow of the American Association for the Advancement of Science and served as President (2002–06) of Research Committee 02 (Economy and Society) of the International Sociological Association from 2002 to 2006. He was chair of the Section on International Political Economy of the International Studies Association from 1984 to 1986, and chair of the Section on the Political Economy of the World-System of the American Sociological Association in 1982. He founded the Institute for Research on World-Systems at the University of California, Riverside. He is founding editor of the Journal of World-Systems Research, which is the official journal of the Political Economy of the World-System section of the American Sociological Association.

== Publications ==
Chase-Dunn is the author, co-author, editor, or co-editor of over a dozen books, including most notably Global Formation: Structures of The World-Economy, a major theoretical synthesis and restatement of the world-systems approach to the study of social change.

== Bibliography ==
- Unity on the Global Left: Critical reflections on Samir Amin's call for a New International (ed.). London: Routledge, 2021.
- Global Struggle and Social Change Movements: From Prehistory to World Revolution in the 21st Century (with Paul Almeida). Baltimore: Johns Hopkins University Press, 2020.
- Social change: Globalization from the Stone Age to the present (with B. Lerro). London: Routledge, 2016.
- Global Social Change. Historical and Comparative Perspectives (with S. B. Babones). Baltimore, Maryland: The Johns Hopkins University Press, 2006.
- Global Formation: Structures of the World Economy. London, Oxford and New York: Basil Blackwell, 1999.
- Rise and Demise. Comparing World Systems (with Th. D. Hall). Boulder, Colorado: Westview Press, 1997.
- Socialist States in the World System (ed.) Beverly Hills and London: Sage, 1982.
