= Journal of World-Systems Research =

- Discipline: Sociology
- Language: English
- Edited by: Andrej Grubačić

Publication details
- History: 1995-present
- Publisher: University Library System, University of Pittsburgh for the Political Economy of the World-System (PEWS) Section of the American Sociological Association (United States)
- Frequency: Biannual
- Open access: Yes

Standard abbreviations
- ISO 4: J. World-Syst. Res.

Indexing
- ISSN: 1076-156X
- LCCN: sn94005097
- OCLC no.: 782887960

Links
- Journal homepage

The Journal of World-Systems Research (JWSR) is a biannual, open access, peer-reviewed academic journal in the field of world-systems analysis, established in 1995 by founding editor Christopher Chase-Dunn at the Institute for World-System Research at the University of California at Riverside. As of 2015, it is published by the Political Economy of the World-System (PEWS) Section of the American Sociological Association and by the University Library System, University of Pittsburgh.

The Journal of World-Systems Research is an online, fully open access journal of the ASA Political Economy Section - by fully open, the journal does not charge either authors or readers for their articles - all costs of the journal are paid through ASA dues. The journal was one of the first online, peer-reviewed academic journals, published originally as an online archive of scholarly papers accessed using the Gopher (protocol).

JWSR develops and disseminates scholarly research from a variety of disciplines on topics that are relevant to the analysis of world-systems, especially when proceeding from several different theoretical stances and disciplines. JWSR also publishes in multiple languages to provide a mechanism for meaningful discussion between scholars in both the global north and south.

The journal describes its purpose as being:

to produce a high quality publication of world-systems research articles; to publish quantitative and comparative research on world-systems; to publish works of theory construction and codification of causal propositions; to publish data sets in connection with articles; to publish reviews of books relevant to world-systems studies; and to encourage authors to use the hypermedia advantages of electronic publication to present their research results.

The journal's current editor-in-chiefs are Devparna Roy and Daniel Pasciuti.

== Editors ==
- 1994–2000, 2000-2007 Chris Chase-Dunn
- 2000-2007 Wally Goldfrank
- 2007-2011 Andrew K. Jorgenson
- 2007-2011 Edward Kick
- 2011- Jackie Smith
- 2020-2025 Andrej Grubačić
- 2026 - Devparna Roy and Daniel Pasciuti
