= Archive of European Integration =

Electronic repository and archive

The Archive of European Integration (AEI) is an electronic repository and archive for research materials on the topic of European integration and unification. The AEI contains two types of documents:

- European Community publications intended for public distribution, published by the European Coal and Steel Community (ECSC), the European Atomic Energy Commission (Euratom), the European Economic Community (EEC), the European Communities (EC), and the European Union (EU) (all hereafter referred to as EC/EU documents), as well as related organizations such as the European Investment Bank (EIB) and the Western European Union (WEU)
- Research papers produced by private research organizations who agree to have their publications uploaded onto the AEI (see list of Contributing Institutions).

In January, 2016 the AEI contained over 41,800 EC/EU documents and more than 7,300 privately produced documents, making it the largest online repository of EU documents in the world except for EU websites.

Since the creation of the AEI in February 2003, the University Library System (ULS), University of Pittsburgh, Pennsylvania, United States has provided the technical and material support for the AEI. The ULS department of Information Technology - under the directorship of Tim Deliyannides - hosts and maintains the AEI as part of its D-Scribe Digital Publishing program. The AEI system is powered by EPrints 3, free Open Source software developed by the School of Electronics and Computer Science, University of Southampton, UK.

== History ==
The Archive of European Integration (AEI) was initiated in early 2003 by Dr. Phil Wilkin, then Social Sciences Bibliographer - and current Editor of the AEI - at the ULS, in collaboration with Dr. Michael Nentwich, Austrian Academy of Sciences, Institute of Technology Assessment, Vienna, Austria. Mr. Nentwich was then managing editor of the European Research Papers Archive (ERPA). ERPA was an Internet-based platform providing access to the papers of several research institutions focusing on European integration. ERPA featured only referred high quality series, featuring some form of refereeing, and the AEI was designed to complement ERPA by collecting research materials on European integration which did not necessarily meet ERPA's high quality standards. ERPA was archived on 1 March 2015.

In fall 2004, Barbara Sloan, then Head of Public Inquiries, Delegation of the European Union to the United States, Washington, DC, (then the Delegation of the European Commission to the United States) began working with the AEI on digitizing and uploading EC/EU documents onto the AEI. The Delegation's EU library collection, founded in the mid-1950s, is by far the largest collection of EC/EU documentation in North America. A comprehensive guide to this collection can be found at European Union Archival Collection at the University of Pittsburgh, pp. 31–41. The Delegation donated this collection - spanning years early 1950s to 2004 - to the ULS in 2007. The collection contains both a shelf section and a "research files" section. The latter consists of 650 linear shelf feet of mostly small working and staff documents arranged in folders by subject, and will provide thousands of hard to locate materials for digitization. There is a "finding aid" for the "research files" collection at Barbara Sloan European Union Document Collection.

The AEI immediately began using this collection as a source of documents to digitize and place onto the AEI. The goal was to complement the existing electronic collections on EU websites. The AEI Delegation collection contains two primary types of document formats: series and individual bound items in monographic form which most libraries would classify and place on shelves, and "internal working documents" which most libraries would not classify, making them more difficult to locate. At first the AEI, cognizant of the possibility that the EU itself might digitize large numbers of its older documents, took a conservative approach, digitizing mostly the internal working documents (COM docs) and staff working documents (SEC docs) and other select documents. Indeed, in 2009-2010 the EU did digitize and place on EU Bookshop over 2,000,000 pages of its bound documents.

In 2011-2012 the AEI adopted a new, long-range policy regarding digitization, for several reasons. First, the AEI learned that it was unlikely that the EU would perform more large-scale digitization. Consequently, the AEI could develop a true "archive" where the goal would be to digitize as many documents as resources allowed.

Second, the two EU websites containing the bulk of EC/EU documentation - EU Bookshop and EUR-Lex: Access to European Union Law - contained only a portion of these documents. In EU Bookshop, many of the annuals and series there are not complete runs. Either they do not contain earlier documents from the 1950-60s, and/or volumes are missing throughout the run. Eur-Lex contains a considerable number of full text COM documents published 1990-2000 and nearly all 2001-present, but very few which were published before 1990. Despite their importance for research purposes, there is no comprehensive list of COM documents for the early years. Two indexes published 1976-1986 listed all COM docs, but there is no available written record which contains the titles of previous COM docs. The AEI Delegation collection contains nearly all of these documents which are missing from the EU Bookshop and Eur-Lex, which it will digitize.

Third, navigating the EU Bookshop during large parts of the day is very slow, and much slower on older computers. In order to make documents easily available, the AEI decided to download annual and serial documents from the EU Bookshop and place them on the AEI, thereby furnishing full runs of all in one place. In most cases these runs will go from earliest volume up through 2000. It is likely all these runs will be completed sometime in 2017. Here are some examples (NOTE: some annuals and serials have been only partially uploaded):

Annual reports - located on Browse by EU Annual Reports - about 900 have been located. Examples:

- Joint Annual Report on Individual ACP Member States, 2002-2011 (312 items) (under heading ACP/AASM)
- European Agricultural Guidance and Guarantee Fund, 1973-2013 (87 items) (under heading AGRICULTURE)
- Report of the Auditor, Audit Board and Court of Auditors, 1954-2003 (91 items) (under heading BUDGET AND FINANCING)
- Operation of Nuclear Power Plants, 1974-2000 (26 items) (under heading ENERGY)
- Pre-accession reports on candidate countries, 1998–present (181 items) (under heading ENLARGEMENT)
- "General Reports on the Activities of..." European Atomic Energy Community (Euratom), European Coal and Steel Community (ECSC), European Economic Community (EEC), European Communities (EC), European Union (EU), 1953-2011 (157 items) (under heading GENERAL)
- Investment in Coalmining and Iron and Steel, 1951-2003 (59 items) (under heading INDUSTRY)
- Manual of the Common Assembly (ECSC)/Manual of the European Parliamentary Assembly/Manual of the European Parliament, 1956-67 (13 items) (under heading INSTITUTIONS)
- Review of the Council's Work, 1960-1999 (46 items) (under heading INSTITUTIONS)
- Synopsis of the Court (of Justice), 1971-2013 (39 items) (under heading INSTITUTIONS)
- Comparative Tables of the Social Security System, 1959-1989 (30 items) (under heading SOCIAL)
- Inventory of Taxes, 1965-2000 (17 items) (under heading TAXATION)
- Eurostat documents 1950s to mid-1900s (scattered throughout Browse by EU Annual Reports) - each title will include word Statistics or -Statistics at end of title). Although many of these are series, they are placed on the Annual Report page to keep all Eurostat publications together

Series and periodicals - located on Browse by EU Series and Periodicals - about 180 have been located: Examples:

- EEC/AASM/ACP Consultative Assembly Session Documents, 1961-1982 (111 items) (under heading ACP/AASM)
- Newsletter on the Common Agricultural Policy/Green Europe//Green Europe Newsletter, 1963-1998 (290 items) (under heading AGRICULTURE)
- The Economic Situation in the Community Quarterly, 1958-1978 (108 items) (under heading ECONOMIC AND FINANCE)
- Graphs and Notes on the Economic Situation in the Community, 1959-1978 (226 items) (under heading ECONOMIC AND FINANCE)
- Vocational Training Informational Bulletin, 1974-2009 (110 items( (under heading EDUCATION AND VOCATIONAL TRAINING)
- Europe Information - Development, 1978-2010 (140 items) (under heading EXTERNAL/DEVELOPMENT)
- Bulletins of the EC/EEC/EU and the ECSC, 1954–1995, (573 items) as well as Bulletin Supplements, 1961-2001 (288 items) (under heading GENERAL)
- Assembly of Western European Union-Proceedings, 1955-1999 (255 items) (under heading GENERAL)
- Council Press Releases, 1975-2003 (992 items) (under heading GENERAL)
- Council Press Releases: Council Meetings, 1975-1993 (1430 items) (under heading GENERAL)
- European Parliament Session and Working Documents, 1958-1995 (2836 items) (under heading GENERAL)
- Speeches, 1946-1999 (1988 items) (under heading GENERAL)
- Results of the Business Survey carried out among Managements in the Community, 1962-1998 (289 items) (under heading INDUSTRY)
- Debates: Common Assembly/European Parliamentary Assembly/European Parliament Session and Working documents, 1950s-1985 (530 items) (under heading INSTITUTIONS)
- Information Note - Social Situation in the Community (High Authority, ECSC), 1958-1968 (74 items) (under heading SOCIAL)
- Social Security for Migrant Workers, 1965-1990 (65 items) (under heading SOCIAL)
- Women of Europe, 1977-2000 (204 items) (under heading SOCIAL).

Institutional newsletters and information bulletins - such as institutional and DG newsletters, etc. (scattered throughout Browse by EU Series and Periodicals) - over 100 have been located.

Numerous documents not part of any series. Mostly one-off documents Commission working documents and reports.

== Supporters ==
- European Studies Center, University of Pittsburgh Center for International Studies
- European Union Studies Association

== See also ==
- European Integration
- Historical Archives of the European Union in Florence
