= Herpha =

Town of ancient Cappadocia

Coordinates: 38°40′08″N 36°13′14″E

Herpha (Ancient Greek: Ἧρπα), also known as Erpha and Herpa and Erpa, was a town of ancient Cappadocia, inhabited during Hellenistic, Roman, and Byzantine times.

Strabo says that King Ariarathes built dams to control rivers, including the Carmalas near Herpa. His goal was to block the river and create a controlled water basin. However, when the dam broke, the water rushed out violently and caused serious flooding downstream, damaging parts of Cilicia near Mallos and destroying land and settlements. Because of the destruction, the affected communities later appealed to the Romans, and Ariarathes was forced to pay compensation.

Its site is located at the crossing of the Karmalas on the main road, Asiatic Turkey.
