= The Second Stage =

1981 book by Betty Friedan

- Author: Betty Friedan
- Subject: Feminism
- Publisher: Summit Books
- Publication date: 1981
- Pages: 344
- ISBN: 978-0-671-41034-6
- OCLC: 7717510
- Dewey Decimal: 305.420973
- LC Class: HQ1426 .F847

The Second Stage is a 1981 book by American feminist, activist and writer Betty Friedan, best known for her earlier book The Feminine Mystique, widely credited with having begun second-wave feminism in the United States. Regarded as an influential author and intellectual in the United States, as early as the 1960s Friedan was critical of polarized and extreme factions of feminism that attacked groups such as men and homemakers. One of her later books, The Second Stage critiqued what Friedan saw as the extremist excesses of some feminists.

== Summary ==
Friedan contends that "first stage" of feminism, a movement intended to liberate women from their traditional role as only mothers and house-wives, was coming to an end with the deadline for the ratification of the Equal Rights Amendment, and that it was time to take feminism to a new stage, which could better deal with the issues of a new generation of women.

Issues discussed include: the double enslavement of women at work and at home, the social evolution of masculinity, political backlash to feminist lobbying, developments in the field of management and leadership, and the need to recognize the social and economic value of traditional female occupations.
