= UE News =

UE News (1939–1952) is the tabloid newspaper of the United Electrical, Radio and Machine Workers of America.
