= Hillman Library =

Flagship library of the University of Pittsburgh

Coordinates: 40°26′33″N 79°57′15″W

Hillman Library of the University Library System (ULS), University of Pittsburgh
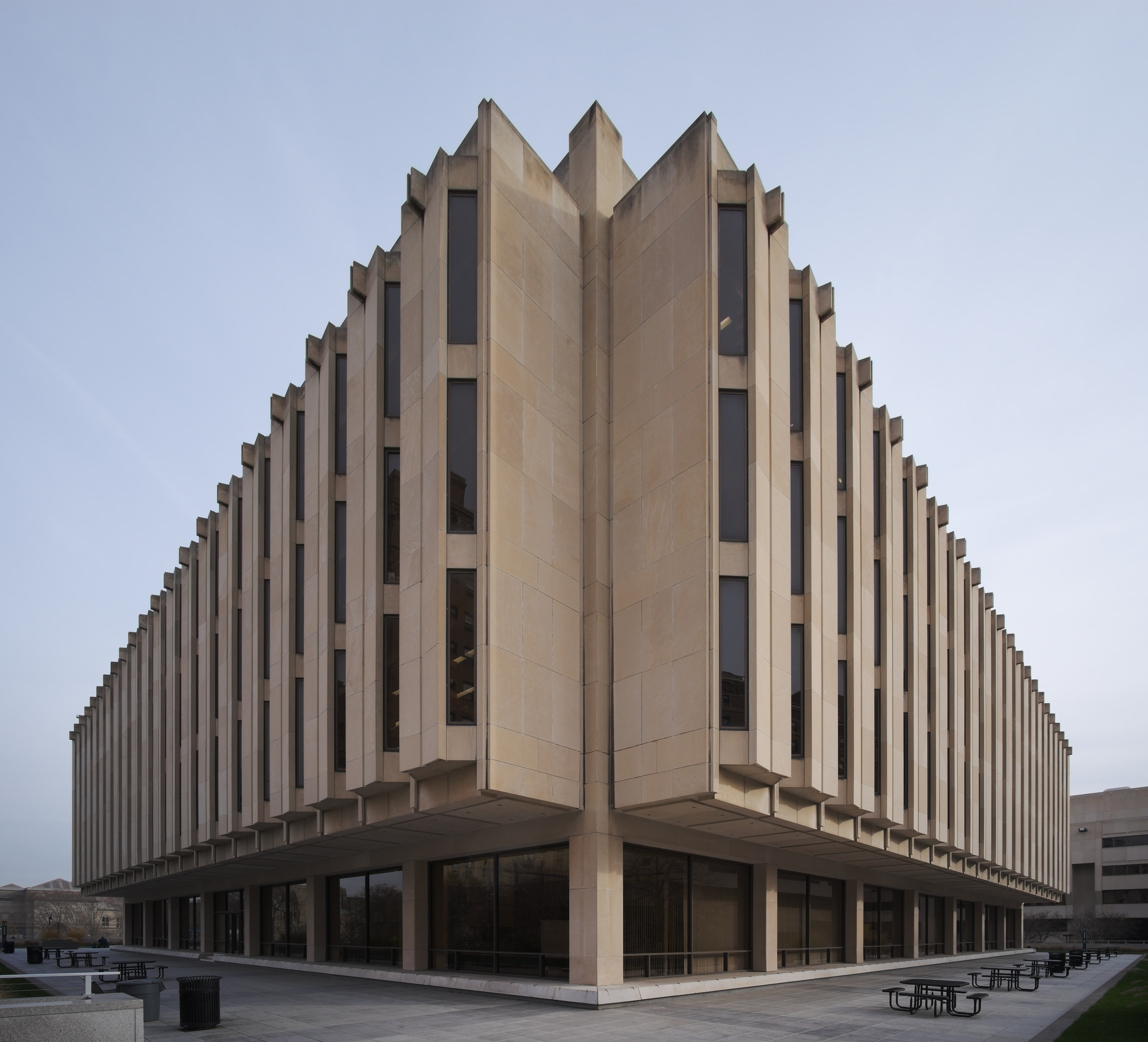
- Location: Pittsburgh
- Established: January 8, 1968 (Hillman)
- Branches: 15

Collection
- Size: 7,124,077 volumes (FY 2014)

Access and use
- Circulation: 170,594 (university wide)

Other information
- Budget: $31.9 million
- Employees: 302 (FTE staff)
- Website: www.library.pitt.edu

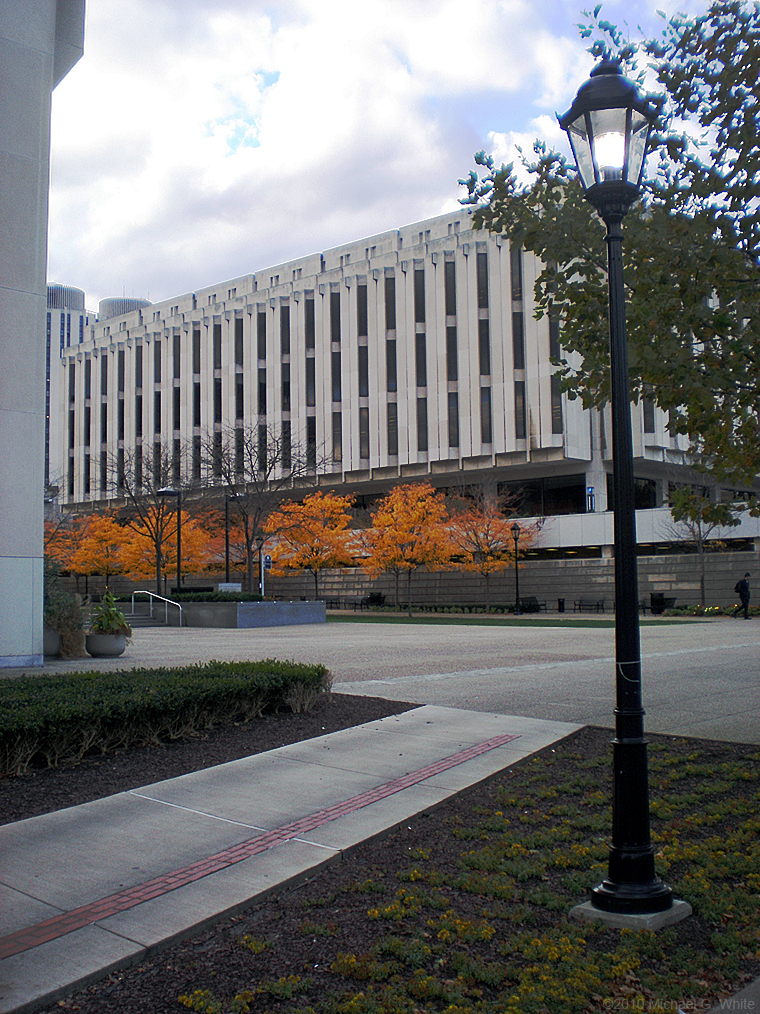
Hillman Library. The red bricks extending to the lower left represent the location of the outfield wall of the former Forbes Field.

Hillman Library is the largest library and the center of administration for the University Library System (ULS) of the University of Pittsburgh in Pittsburgh, Pennsylvania, United States. Located on the corner of Forbes Avenue and Schenley Drive, diagonally across from the Cathedral of Learning, Hillman serves as the flagship of the approximately 7.1 million–volume University Library System at Pitt.

== University Library System ==
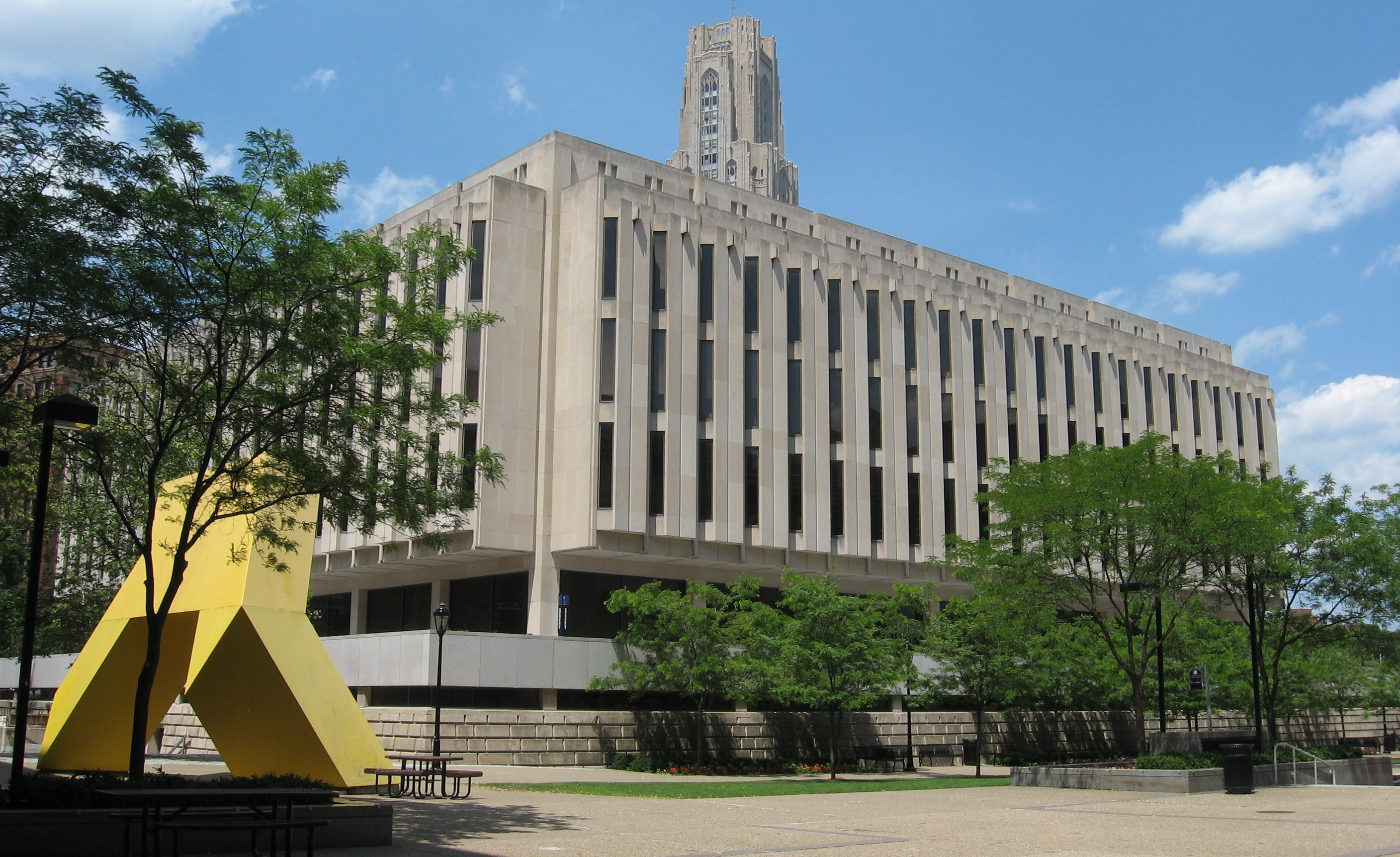
Hillman Library from across Forbes Quadrangle. Tony Smith's Light Up! sculpture can be seen at the bottom left and the top floors of the Cathedral of Learning can be seen peaking above it at center.

The University Library System (ULS) is the University of Pittsburgh's largest library organization and is administered by the Hillman University Librarian and Director, ULS. The organization in its current form dates back to 1982, when the University combined the administration of its libraries for the Graduate Schools of Business, Public and International Affairs, and the School of Library and Information Sciences with that of the Hillman Library and its branches. From the early 1980s the library system adopted many new services and resources alongside the evolution of computer technology including, most notably, the installation and unveiling of its first online catalog based on the NOTIS integrated library system.

In addition to the Hillman Library, the ULS includes the following libraries and collections on the Pittsburgh campus:

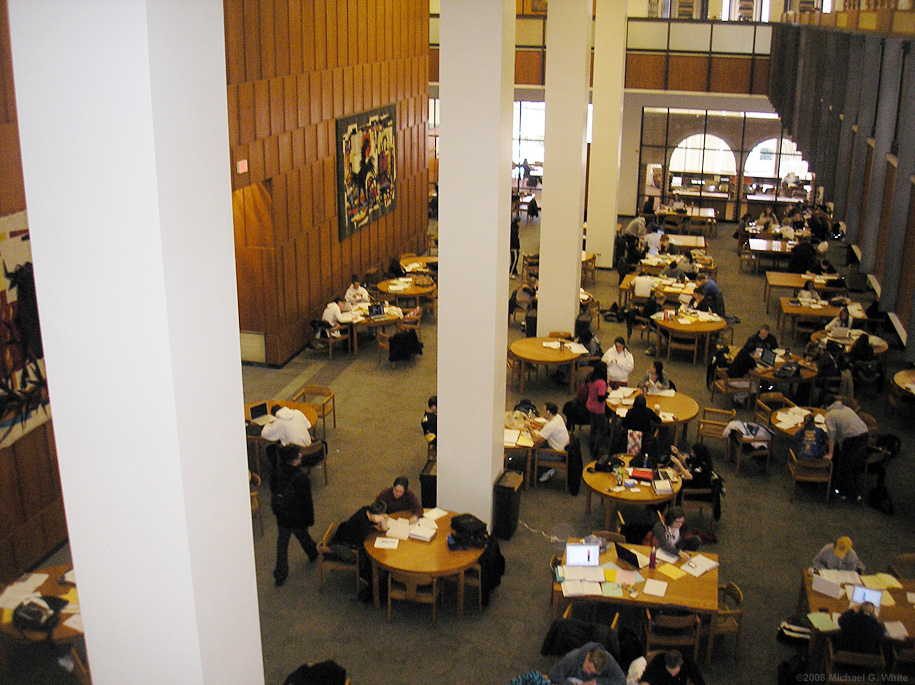
Study area inside Hillman Library. A pair of Virgil Cantini tapestries can be seen hanging on the wall to the left.

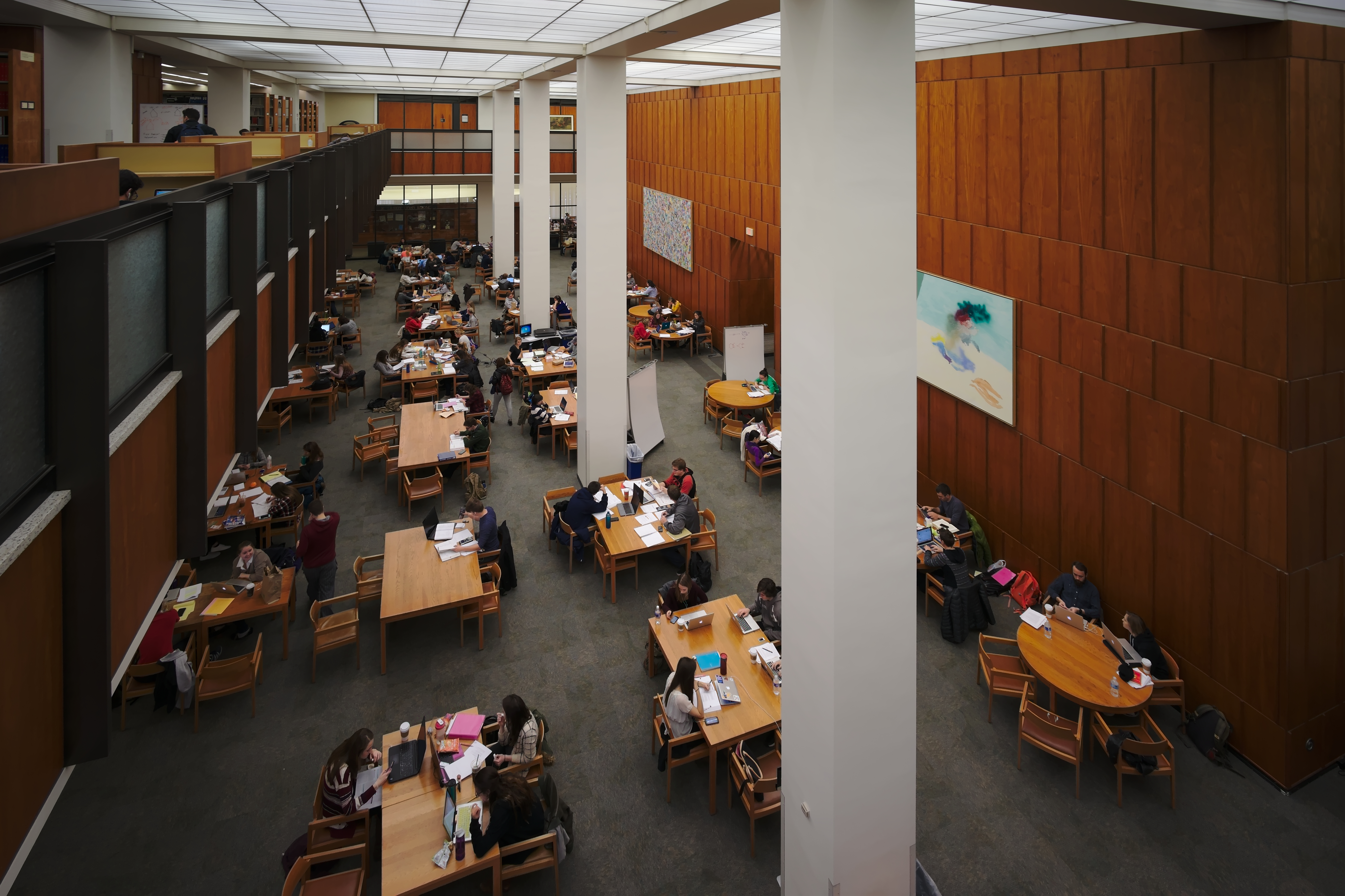
Another study area inside Hillman Library. Another pair of tapestries can be seen hanging on the wall to the right.

- Allegheny Observatory Library
- Archives Service Center
- Center for American Music
- Chemistry Library
- Bevier Engineering Library
- Frick Fine Arts Library
- Langley Library (biological sciences, behavioral neuroscience)
- Library Resource Facility
- Music Library

The Library Resource Facility, located three miles from the heart of the Pittsburgh campus, houses many of the ULS' back-office operations in addition to the Archives Service Center and the Library Collections Storage Unit, a high-density book storage facility with a capacity of 2.7 million volumes. The libraries on the University's four regional campuses at Bradford, Greensburg, Johnstown, and Titusville also belong to the ULS.

A member of the Association of Research Libraries, the ULS ranks 22nd out of the ARL's 126 member libraries, placing it in the top 20% of North America's largest academic libraries and is the 29th largest overall library in the United States. The ULS has been commended for its use of technology, including the digitization of its unique collection and improving the accessibility of its online resources. Duane Webster, executive director emeritus of the Association of Research Libraries, notes that the ULS has "transformed not only [its own] school's library but also the future of research libraries." The ULS has also been noted for its publication of new digital content in its D-Scribe Digital Publishing program.

The ULS partners with other University of Pittsburgh libraries including the Barco Law Library and the Health Sciences Library System, both located on the Pittsburgh campus. The ULS shares a single online system with these partner libraries, collaborates with them to provide facilitated access to all collections, and cooperates on other projects to serve the University.

== History ==
Hillman Library was built on land that had bordered Forbes Field and was donated in the 1950s to Pitt by coal magnate J. Hartwell Hillman, Jr. When Forbes Field was razed in 1971, three other buildings were planned as a cluster for the site: Wesley W. Posvar Hall, David L. Lawrence Hall, and the University of Pittsburgh School of Law.

Design of Hillman Library was led by Celli-Flynn and Associates who served as coordinating architects. Kuhn, Newcomer & Valentour served as associated architects with Harrison & Abramovitz acting as consulting architects to the university. Dolores Miller and Associates consulted on the interior design, and Keyes Metcalf served as a library consultant. Construction began in June 1965, and the library opened on January 8, 1968, while its formal dedication was held on September 6, 1968. It is named for John H. Hillman, Jr. Both the Hillman family and the Hillman Foundation gave millions toward its construction. The facade consists of Indiana Limestone alternated with rows of oriel windows, which were designed by Max Abramovitz The building's podium wall is intended to echo the Renaissance-style rusticated stone base of the Carnegie Library across Schenley Plaza. The interior was modeled on the style of Mies van der Rohe with warm teak and black-metal framing. Floor-to-ceiling windows that were placed at a bay window angle in order to be inconspicuous on the plane surface of the outer wall while still providing light. With five floors, seating for 1,539 students, and holding 1.9 million volumes, Hillman is the largest of the 17 libraries on the Pitt campus. In 1996, architect Celli-Flynn and Associates and Kuhn, Newcomer & Valentour won the Timeless Award for Enduring Design from the Pittsburgh chapter of the American Institute of Architects for its design of Hillman Library. In 2013, the library began transferring some book collections from Hillman Library to the university's Thomas Boulevard Library Resource Facility in the Point Breeze neighborhood of the city in order to make room for renovations that will add additional seating and group-study rooms to the library. In addition, in the Fall of 2013, the library expanded its hours so that it will be open around the clock from Sunday morning to Friday night. Hillman Library is currently undergoing a phased floor-by-floor renovation with an estimated total project cost of $60 million to $100 million.

== Holdings, special collections, and rooms ==
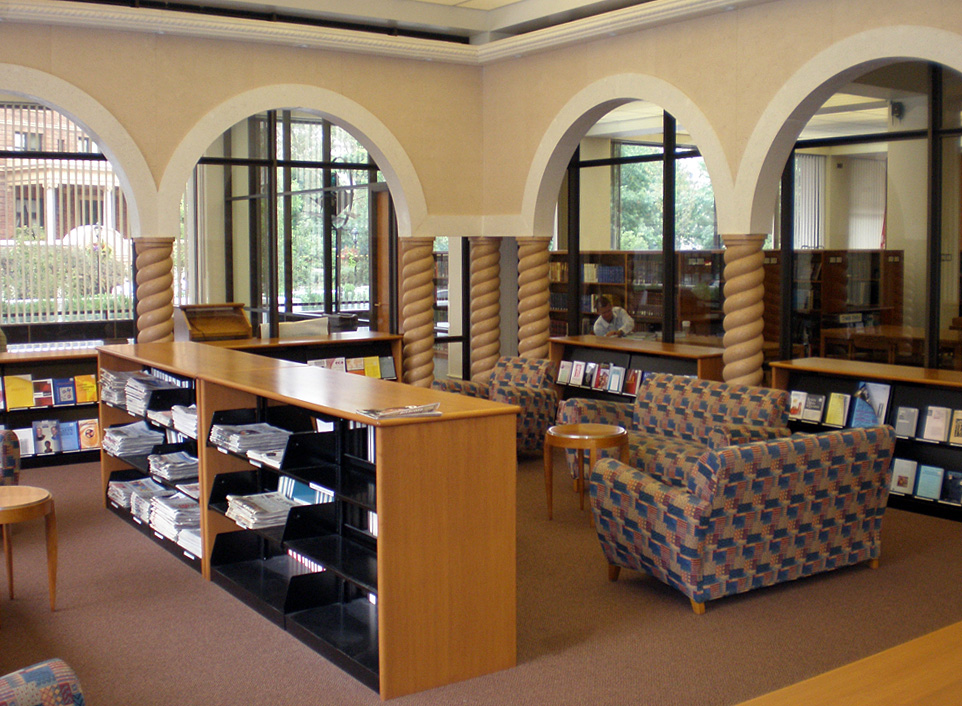
The Latin American Reading Room

Hillman Library, which serves as the flagship and central administrative library of the University of Pittsburgh's University Library System, holds approximately 1.5 million volumes of the 7.1 million total ULS volume collection. It also contains over 200 computer stations, a study capacity for 1500 users, and houses various special collections, themed rooms, and specialized technology study areas. $12.9 million in additional renovations to Hillman was approved in July, 2013.

Hillman Library contains many different collections and reading spaces. Among them are:

- African-American Collection
- Alldred Collection
- Alliance College Polish Collection
- Archives of Scientific Philosophy
- Buhl Social Work Collection
- Cup & Chaucer Café
- Curtis Theater Collection
- Dick Thornburgh Room
- East Asian Library
- The Gertrude and Philip Hoffman Judaic Collection
- GIS (Geographic Information Service)

- Government Publications Collection
- K. Leroy Irvis Reading Room
- Japan Information Center
- Eduardo Lozano Latin American Collection
- Map Collection
- Media Resources (Film/Video Collection)
- Microforms Collection
- Nesbitt Collection of Children's Literature
- Periodicals Collection
- Special Collections
- Stark Listening Center

Specialized named rooms include the A. J. Schneider Reading Room, the Amy E. Knapp Room, the K. Leroy Irvis Room, the Latin American Reading Room, and the Thornburgh Room.

=== A. J. Schneider Reading Room ===
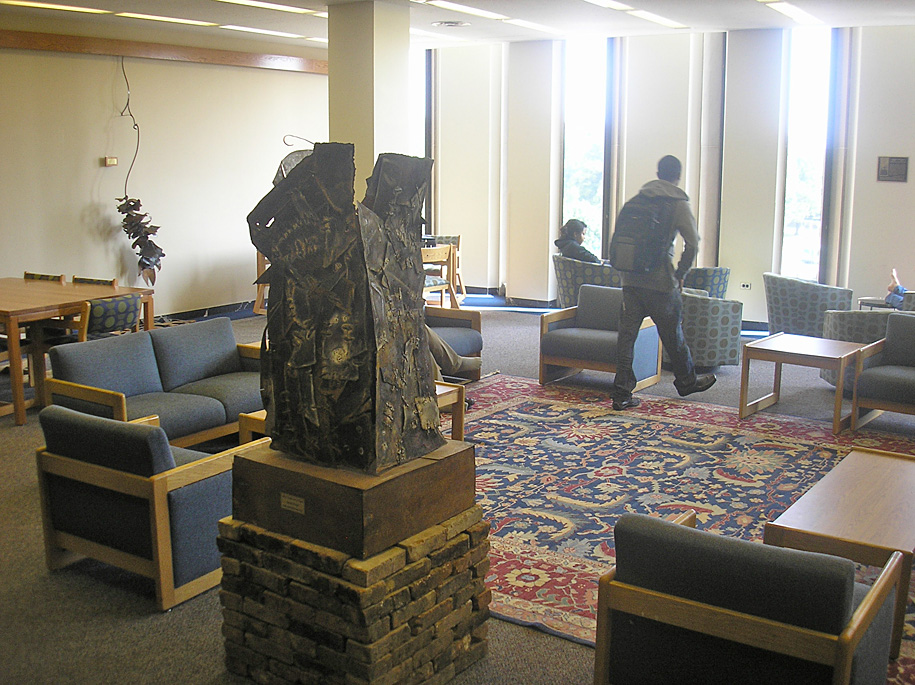
A. J. Schneider Reading Room

The A. J. Schneider Reading Room on the third floor of Hillman Library was created by the Schneider family in the late 1990s in memory of their late son, A. J., a 1993 Pitt alumnus who died in a 1996 military helicopter accident. The family also created the A. J. Schneider Studio Arts Award which for Pitt studio art students. Winning entries from an annual student art exhibition are displayed in the reading room for a one-year period.

=== Amy E. Knapp Room ===
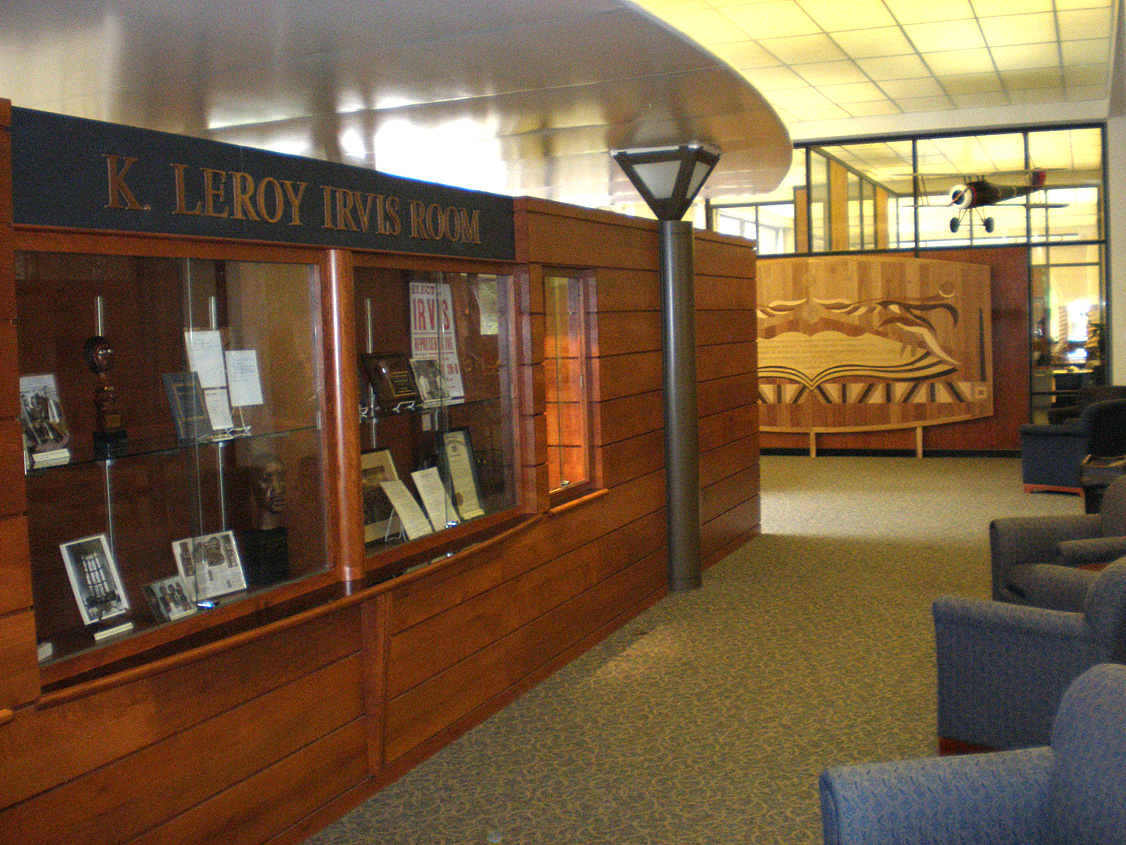
K. Leroy Irvis Reading Room

The Amy E. Knapp Room is a seminar room on the ground floor of Hillman Library that was dedicated on December 15, 2008 in honor of Amy Knapp, a Pitt alumnae, ULS librarian, and School of Information Sciences adjunct professor who died from cancer in 2008. The room features a plaque and portrait etching in honor of Knapp. In addition to the room, the Dr. Amy E. Knapp Award was also created to recognize individuals' service to ULS and the community.

=== K. Leroy Irvis Room ===
The K. Leroy Irvis Room is a first floor reading room that is also home to the archives of K. Leroy Irvis who was the first African American to serve as a speaker of the house in any state legislature in the United States since Reconstruction. Irvis represented Pittsburgh in the Pennsylvania House of Representatives from 1958 to 1988. Included in the archives are Irvis' personal papers, legislative materials, campaign literature, photographs, and newspaper clippings. The 21,000 square foot room was designed by architect Howard Graves to reflect Ivis, including his fondness of airplanes which is reflected in the ceiling design. Ludwig Mies van der Rohe's 1929 Barcelona Pavilion was used as a benchmark reference for the project. The room includes a gallery, reading area, reception area, archive storage, and administration and office space.

=== Latin American Reading Room ===
The Latin American Reading Room located on the first floor of Hillman Library is the home to the Eduardo Lozano Latin American Collection. Designed by Peruvian native Victor Beeltran to be reminiscent of a Spanish courtyard, the room has windows on three sides and contains sand-colored arches and Solomonic columns reminiscent of Churrigueresque.

=== Thornburgh Room ===
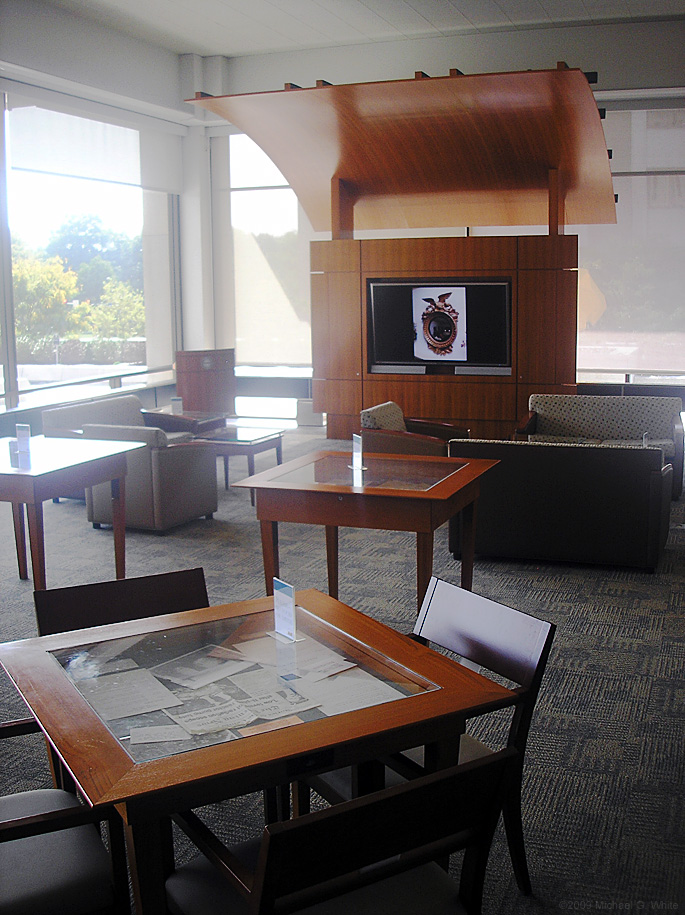
Dick Thornburgh Room

The Dick Thornburgh Room contains artifacts from the Dick Thornburgh Archives Collection and adjoins the Jay Waldman Seminar Room.

== Art ==
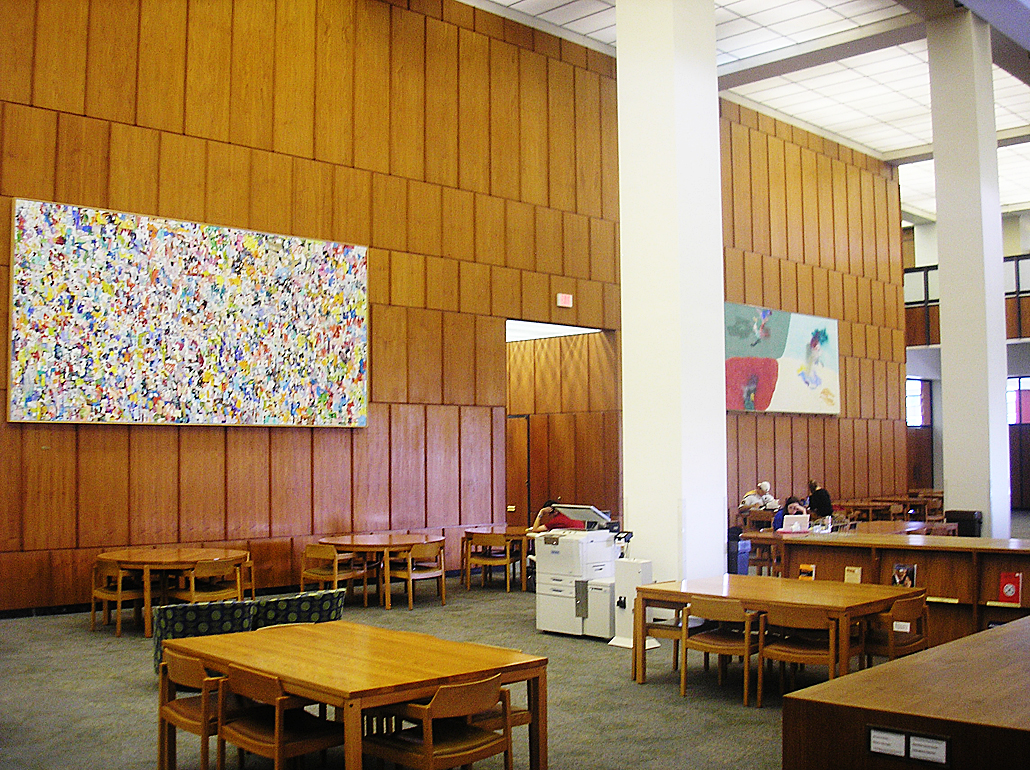
First floor study area with various works of art

A rotating selection of John James Audubon prints from the university's copy of The Birds of America, one of only 120 complete collections in existence, is on view in the library's ground floor display case. Individual plates from this collection are exhibited for two weeks at a time in order of plate number. Many other graphic and sculptural works are nestled among the stairways and study areas on the building's upper floors, some of which are on loan from the Carnegie Museum of Art.

Several works of Virgil Cantini are in the library, including a wood and metal sculpture of an arrow-pierced St. Sebastian, located in the first floor stairwell, and a wooden sculpture of the Virgin Mary holding a lamb. Flanking the wall opposite the first floor reference desk are two abstract works: "Modern Warfare" by Kes Zapkus and "Arcing Light" by Albert Stadler. A bronze 1934 self-portrait by Ivan Meštrović can be found on the ground floor. A large bust of Confucius by Chinese artist Li Guangyu and a stone sculpture, "The Sound of Autumn", by Masayuki Nagare are on the second floor. Near the special collections reading room on the third floor is a selection of early 20th century illustrations in watercolor, charcoal and crayon created to accompany the work of mystery writer Mary Roberts Rinehart. Also on the third floor are works by winners of the A.J. Schneider Studio Arts Award, selected from among entries in the annual student exhibition. Winners agree to allow their work to be displayed for one year in the reading room.

In addition, a folk music concert series entitled The Emerging Legends Series is performed in The Cup & Chaucer café on the ground floor of Hillman Library. The series, a collaboration between the University of Pittsburgh Library System and Calliope: The Pittsburgh Folk Music Society, is free and open to the public.

Tony Smith's 1971 painted steel sculpture Light Up can be found outside Hillman library in Forbes Quad between the library and Posvar Hall.

== Woodruff medal ==
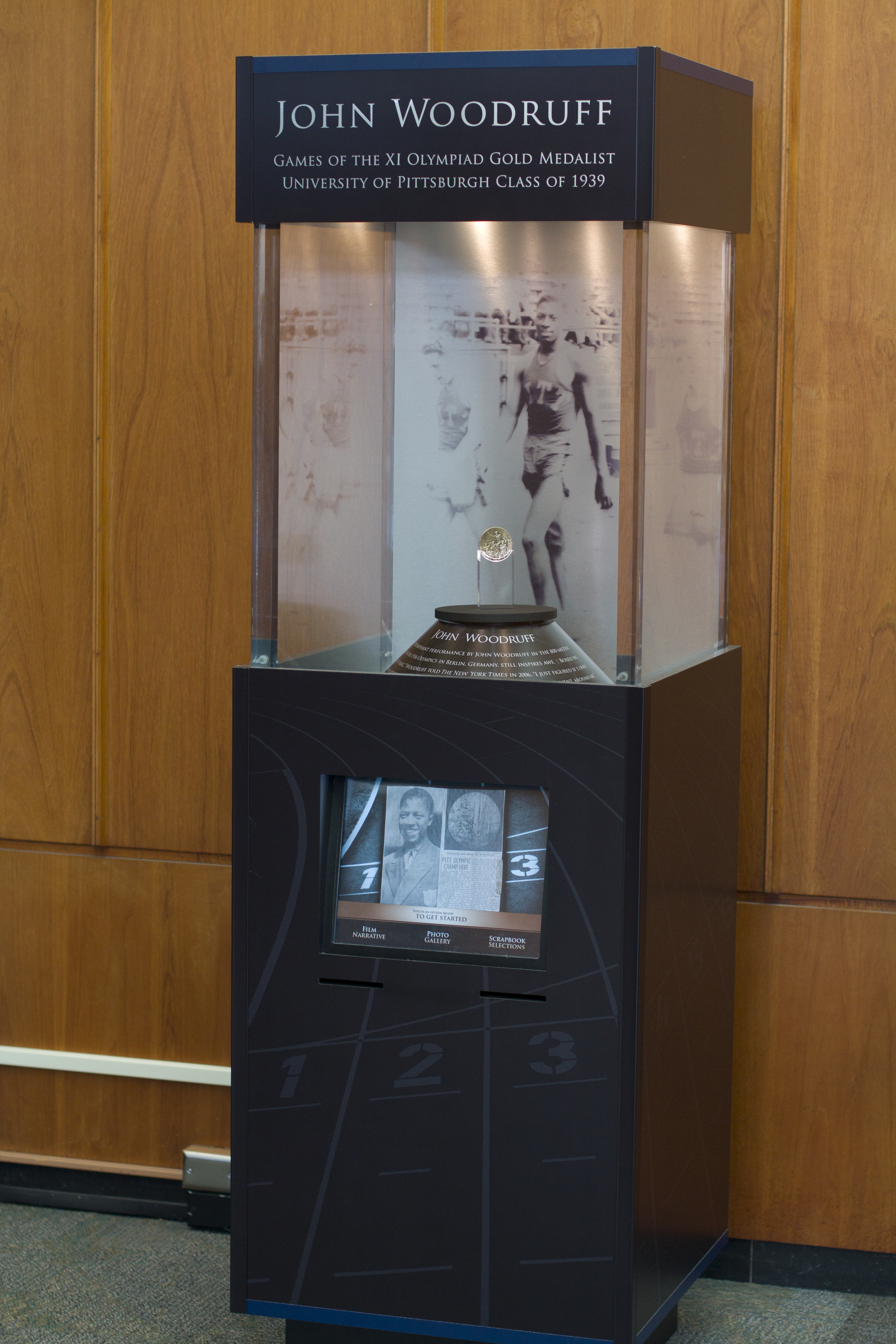
Display case containing John Woodruff's 1936 Summer Olympics gold medal

1936 Berlin Summer Olympics track and field 800-meter gold medalist John Woodruff, a 1939 alumnus of the University of Pittsburgh, donated his gold medal to the university in 1990. Woodruff insisted on it being displayed in the university's library where it would be appreciated not just as an athletic achievement, but in its social and historical context. For years the medal was displayed in an inconspicuous location on the ground floor of Hillman Library. Woodruff's 800 m win in the 1936 games was the first for an African American in front of Adolf Hitler and was achieved in what has been called "the most daring move seen on a track" when he stopped in mid-race in order to break out of a pack of runners and then retook the lead in a sprint to the finish, thereby becoming the first American to achieve gold in 800 m in 24 years. In 2008, the medal was removed for loan to the United States Holocaust Memorial Museum in Washington, D.C., where it was part of the exhibit "State of Deception: The Power of Nazi Propaganda." After the medal's return to the university, it was placed in a new, six-foot tall wood-and-glass display on the first floor of the library. The display was unveiled during a dedication ceremony on October 14, 2011, in commemoration of the 75th anniversary of Woodruff's win. The medal, appraised at $250,000, is securely housed under bulletproof glass on a rotating illuminated pedestal. The display also contains interactive multi-media content including a touchscreen that features film narratives, a photo gallery, and selections of the Woodruff family's personal scrapbook.

== Literary associations ==
Hillman Library is a primary setting for The Mysteries of Pittsburgh, a novel by Pitt alumnus Michael Chabon, who won the Pulitzer Prize for Fiction in 2001.

== Gallery ==
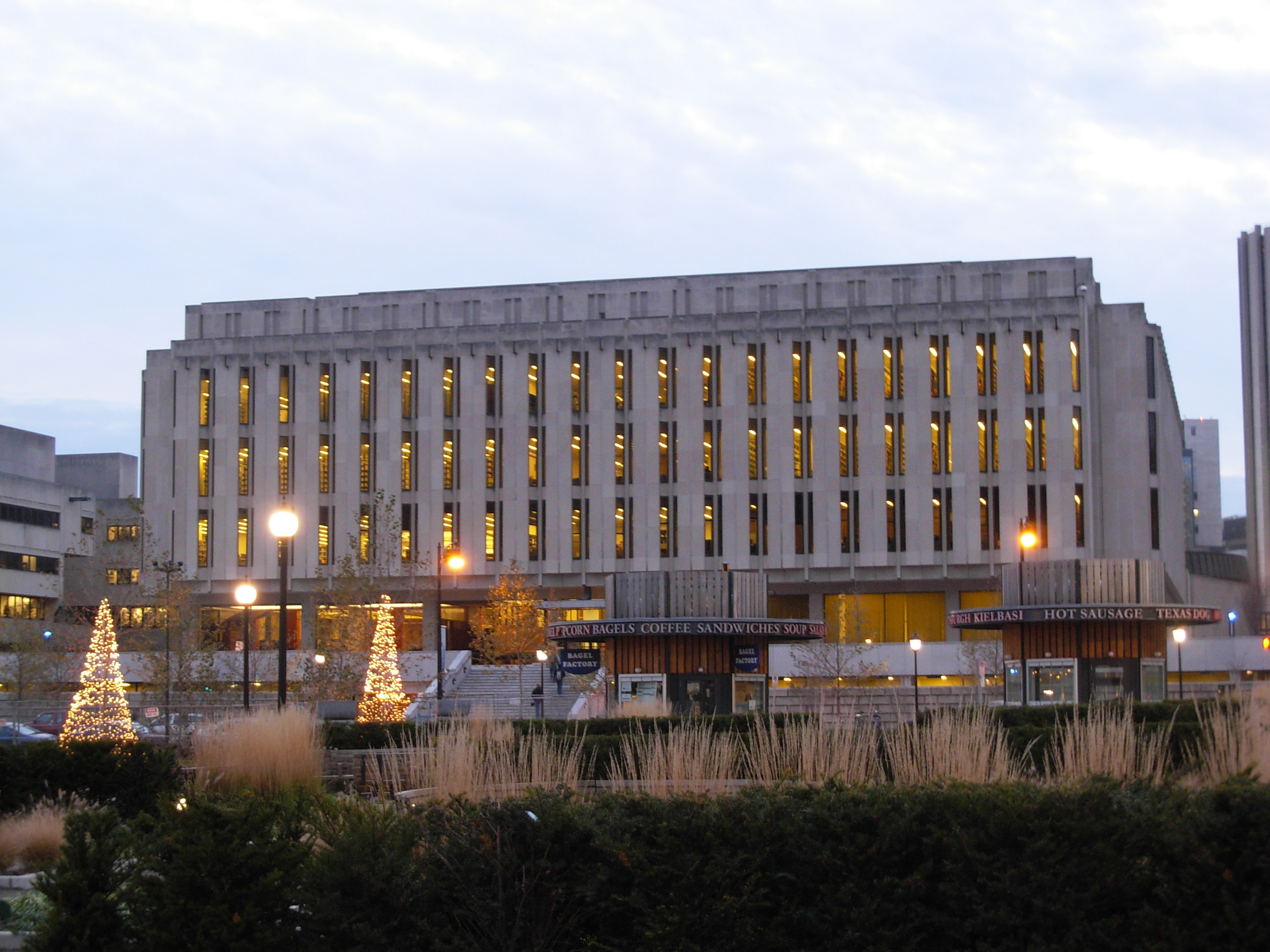

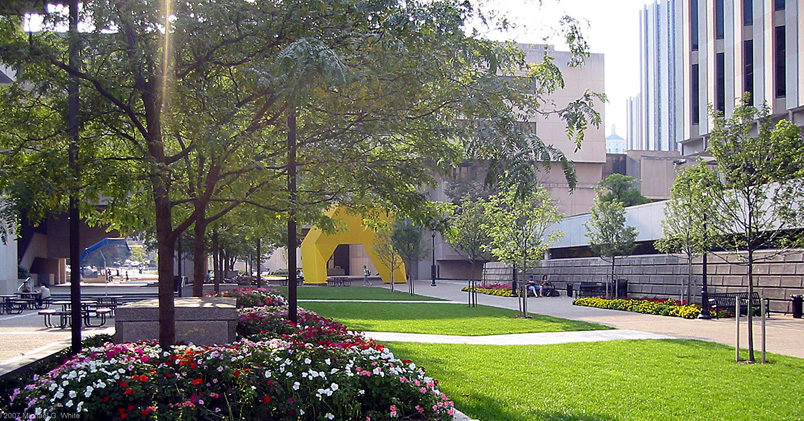
Forbes Quad. The side of Hillman Library can be seen on the right.

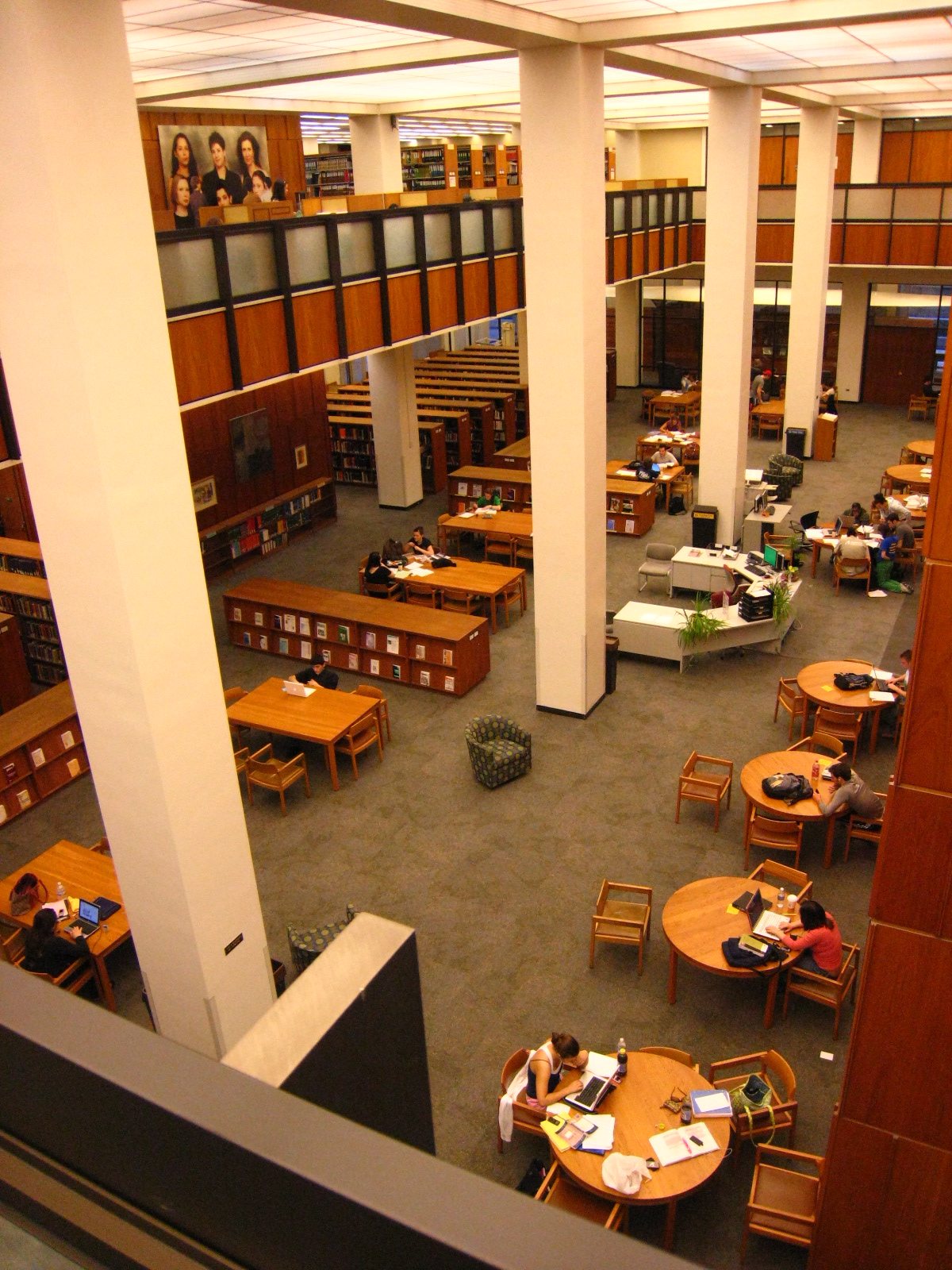
Study area on the first floor, which has since been renovated.

== Notes ==
| Preceded by School of Information Sciences Building | University of Pittsburgh buildings Hillman Library; Constructed: 1965-1968 | Succeeded by David Lawrence Hall |
