= Veterans Health Administration =

Health service for former United States military personnel

U.S. Department of Veterans Affairs Veterans Health Administration
- Logo

Agency overview
- Formed: 1865; 161 years ago
- Preceding agency: Veterans Health Service
- Jurisdiction: Federal government of the United States
- Headquarters: Veteran Affairs Building 810 Vermont Avenue NW., Washington, D.C., US; 38°54′03″N 77°02′05″W
- Employees: 350,790 (2021)
- Annual budget: FY2022: $97.5 billion USD (appropriated); FY2023: $113.3 billion USD (advance appropriation); FY2023: $122.7 billion USD (budget request)
- Agency executives: John Figueroa, Acting Under Secretary of Veterans Affairs for Health; Steven L. Lieberman, MD, Principal Deputy Under Secretary for Health
- Parent department: United States Department of Veterans Affairs
- Website: www.va.gov/HEALTH/

The Veterans Health Administration (VHA) is the component of the United States Department of Veterans Affairs (VA) led by the under secretary of veterans affairs for health that implements the healthcare program of the VA through a nationalized healthcare service in the United States, providing healthcare and healthcare-adjacent services to veterans through the administration and operation of 146 VA Medical Centers (VAMC) with integrated outpatient clinics, 772 Community Based Outpatient Clinics (CBOC), and 134 VA Community Living Centers (VA Nursing Home) Programs. It is the largest division in the department, and the second largest in the entire federal government, employing over 350,000 employees. All VA hospitals, clinics and medical centers are owned by and operated by the Department of Veterans Affairs (as opposed to private companies), and all of the staff employed in VA hospitals are federal employees. Because of this, veterans that qualify for VHA healthcare do not pay premiums or deductibles for their healthcare but may have to make copayments depending on the medical procedure. VHA is not a part of the US Department of Defense (DoD) Military Health System.

Many evaluations have found that by most measures VHA care is equal to, and sometimes better than, care provided in the private sector, when judged by standard evidence-based guidelines. A 2009 Congressional Budget Office report on the VHA found that "the care provided to VHA patients compares favorably with that provided to non-VHA patients in terms of compliance with widely recognized clinical guidelines — particularly those that VHA has emphasized in its internal performance measurement system. Such research is complicated by the fact that most users of VHA's services receive at least part of their care from outside providers."

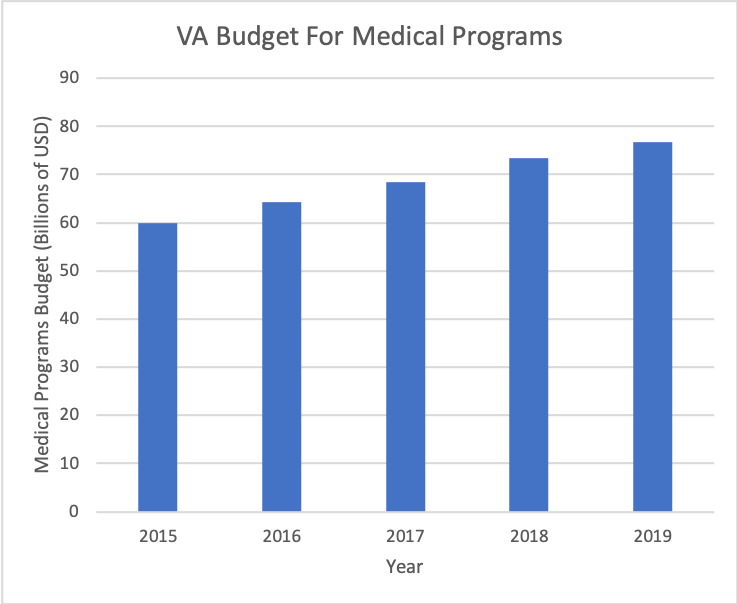
Medical Program Budget Allocation 2015–2019. Data comes from VA budget submissions.

== History ==
The first Federal agency to provide medical care to veterans was the Naval Home in Philadelphia, Pennsylvania. The home was created in 1812 and was followed by the creation of Soldiers Home in 1853 and St. Elizabeth's Hospital in 1855. Congress created the National Home for Disabled Volunteer Soldiers in 1865 in response to the high number of Civil War casualties. These homes were initially intended to be room and board for disabled veterans. However, by the late 1920s, the homes were providing a level of care comparable to hospital care.

President Hoover created the Veterans Administration (VA) in 1930 to consolidate all veteran services. General Omar N. Bradley was appointed to VA administrator and Bradley appointed Major General Paul Hawley as director of VA medicine, both in 1945. Hawley successfully established a policy that affiliated new VA hospitals with medical schools. Hawley also promoted resident and teaching fellowships at VA hospitals. Ultimately, Hawley was responsible for starting the hospital-based research program at the VA. Bradley resigned in 1947. However, upon resignation, 97 hospitals were in operation and 29 new hospital had been built. As a result, the VA health system was able to serve a much larger population of veterans than it had served in previous years.

In 1988, President Reagan signed the Department of Veterans Affairs Act, which elevated the VA to Cabinet-level, then becoming known as the Department of Veterans Affairs. The Department of Veterans Affairs oversees the Veterans Health Administration.

In the mid-1980s the VHA was criticized for their high operative mortality. To that end, Congress passed Public Law 99–166 in December 1985 which mandated the VHA to report their outcomes in comparison to national averages and the information must be risk-adjusted to account for the severity of illness of the VHA surgical patient population. In 1991 the National VA Surgical Risk Study (NVASRS) began in 44 Veterans Administration Medical Centers. By December 31, 1993, there was information for 500,000 non-cardiac surgical procedures. In 1994 NVASRS was expanded to all 128 VHA hospitals that performed surgery. The name was then changed to the National Surgical Quality Improvement Program.

Beginning in the mid-1990s VHA underwent what the agency characterizes as a major transformation aimed at improving the quality and efficiency of care it provides to its patients. That transformation included eliminating underutilized inpatient beds and facilities, expanding outpatient clinics, and restructuring eligibility rules. A major focus of the transformation was the tracking of a number of performance indicators—including quality-of-care measures—and holding senior managers accountable for improvements in those measures.

=== 1993-2000: Dr. Kenneth W. Kizer and VHA Reform ===
The Clinton Healthcare Plan was a health care reform proposed by the Clinton Administration. Even though the reform was not successful, a task force was created in response to the Clinton Healthcare Reform proposal to determine if the VA was ready for managed care. The negative results of market research forced the VA system to re-evaluate its current operations. Research revealed that three out of four veterans would leave the VA network if a national healthcare system were adopted. They also found that there was a high demand for primary care throughout the VA system. Research showed that many VA facilities believed that 55 percent of patients would choose to receive primary care at the VA facility if a primary care system was fully implemented in 1993. The study also showed that the VA facilities believed that 83 percent of veterans would choose to receive primary care at the VA if fully implemented by 1998. These results made it clear to the administration that it was time for a reform. As a result, the VA issued a directive in 1994, that required all VA healthcare facilities to have primary care teams by year 1996. As a result, percentage of patients receiving primary care at the VA increased from 38 percent to 45 percent to 95 percent, during 1993, 1996, and 1999. This mandate served as the foundation for the VA reorganization under Dr. Kenneth W. Kizer.

Dr. Kizer, a physician trained in emergency medicine and Public Health, was appointed by President Bill Clinton as Director of U.S. Veterans Health Administration in 1994. He was hired to update and modernize the VA health system in order to eliminate negative perception and to align the system with current market trends. Core issues included advancements in technology and biomedical knowledge, aging and socioeconomically disadvantaged Medicare patients, coordinating care, and rising healthcare costs. There was much opposition to a major reform. Many legislators preferred an incremental change over a wide-scale reform. However, Kizer was known as being very innovative. To publicize his vision he expressed his mission and vision of the "new VHA" and outlined seven key principles to guide change. His ultimate goal was to provide coordinated, high quality care at a low cost.

He launched his reorganization plan in 1995 by decentralizing the VA system. He organized all VA operating units into 22 geographic based networks known as Veterans Integrated Service Networks (VISNs). This allowed networks to manage themselves and adapt to the demographics of their location. Patients were then assigned to a group of doctors who would provide coordinated care. One director was hired for each VISN network. Instead of hiring all directors internally, a third of the newly hired VISN directors were hired outside of the VA system. The directors were responsible for meeting performance goals and improving upon measurable key efficiency and quality indicators. Directors monitored performances and reports were generated to show each network's performance. Some of these indicators included chronic disease quality, prevention performance, patient satisfaction ratings, and utilization management.

The reform also changed the procedure for allocating funds to the various VISNs. Historically, funds were distributed between hospitals based on historical costs. However, it was found that this method affected efficiency and quality of services. Therefore, funding for each VISN was distributed based on the number of veterans seen in each network, rather than on historical values.

The New England Journal of Medicine conducted a study from 1994–2000 to evaluate the efficacy of the healthcare reform. They gathered the results of the evaluated key indicators from each of the networks and interpreted the results. There were noticeable improvements, compared with the same key indicators used for the Medicare fee for service system, as soon as two years after the reorganization. These improvements continued through year 2000. These results indicate that the changes made throughout the VA healthcare system, under the leadership of Kizer, did improve the efficiency and quality of care in VA healthcare system.

=== Veterans Health Administration scandal of 2014 ===
In 2014, Congress passed the Veterans Access, Choice, and Accountability Act, commonly known as simply the Choice Act. VA Secretary Robert Wilkie assured veterans that the VA wouldn't be privatized and that veterans would still be able to get the same quality of care they had been receiving. In May 2014, major problems with scheduling timely access to medical care became public. According to a retired doctor at the center interviewed by CNN, at least 40 veterans died waiting for care at the Phoenix, Arizona Veterans Health Administration facilities. An investigation of delays in treatment throughout the Veterans Health Administration system was conducted by the Veterans Affairs Inspector General, but it only found six deaths during the delay. On May 30, 2014, Secretary of Veterans Affairs Eric Shinseki resigned from office due to the fallout from the scandal. Despite the negative exposure and the subsequent vows by Washington lawmakers to take action, the major problems still exist.

On June 24, 2014, Senator Tom Coburn, Republican from Oklahoma, and a medical doctor, released a report called Friendly Fire: Death, Delay, and Dismay at the VA which detailed the actions and misconduct of employees of the Department of Veteran Affairs. The report is based on yearlong investigations conducted by Senator Coburn's office on Veterans Health Administration facilities across the nation. The report details the many veterans who have died waiting for health care as a result of the VA misconduct. Secret waiting lists, poor patient care, the millions of dollars that are intended for health care that has gone unspent every year and reports of bonuses paid out to employees who have lied and covered up statistics are also detailed in the report.

However, a VA Inspector General's report issued on August 26, 2014, reported that six, not forty, veterans had died experiencing “clinically significant delays” while on waiting lists to see a VA doctor, and in each of these six cases, “we are unable to conclusively assert that the absence of timely quality care caused the deaths of these veterans.”

=== 2014 - present: Improving care, MISSION Act/Community Care, expansion of Mental Health eligibility ===
With the Choice Act in place, wait times (and ultimately care) at VHA facilities began to improve. According to a study conducted by the Journal of the American Medical Association (JAMA) in 2014, the average wait times to receive health care were 22.5 for VHA and 18.7 days for the private sector. However, by 2017, VHA wait times were significantly shorter than wait times to see a private doctor dropping to 17.7 days for VHA, while the wait for a private doctor increased to 29.8 days. Based on the successes of the original program, Congress expanded the eligibility of the program by passing the John S. McCain III, Daniel K. Akaka, and Samuel R. Johnson VA Maintaining Internal Systems and Strengthening Integrated Outside Networks (MISSION) Act of 2018 (Pub. L. 115–182 (text) (PDF), S. 2372, 132 Stat. 1393), which permanently codified the Choice Act features access (wait time and travel distance) standards into a new Veterans Community Care Program. It also established several additional criteria that qualify the Veteran to receive community care, such as if a Veteran needs a service not available at any VA facility (i.e., maternity care for women), a Veteran lives in a U.S. state (Alaska, Hawaii, New Hampshire) or territory (Guam, American Samoa, Northern Mariana Islands, U.S. Virgin Islands) without a full-service VA medical facility, or it is in the best medical interest of the Veteran, based on Veteran and provider agreement. Additional regulations issued by VA also changed the access standards that would make a Veteran eligible reducing the time from 30 days to 20 days of a request or at a facility within 30 minutes of average driving for a primary care appointment or 28 days and 60 minutes for a specialty appointment.

In 2018, as a result of the passage of the 2018 Consolidated Appropriations Act, VHA was allowed to combat veterans and victims of military sexual trauma who were discharged administratively with an other than honorable discharge (OTH) to access mental health treatment in VA or community care facilities. it also allowed all veterans with a discharge that would typically bar veterans' health care and benefits to petition the Secretary (through the Veterans Benefits Administration) to determine whether or not the character of their discharge is a complete bar to benefits. Even if VBA makes a determination that they are ineligible for monetary and educational benefits, they may still find that such a Veteran is eligible for health care benefits for any service-connected disability.

== Structure ==
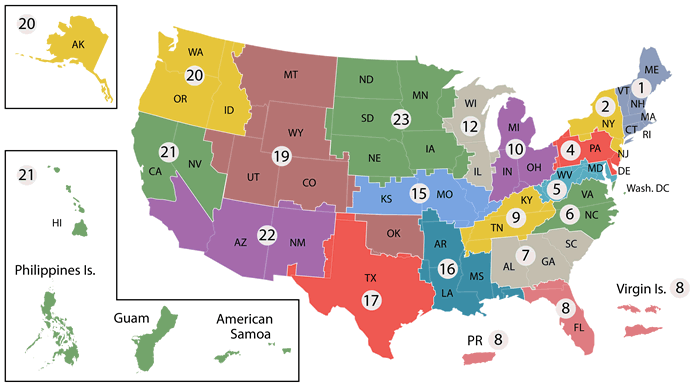
Map of the 21 VHA service regions, called Veterans Integrated Service Networks.

The system is divided into 22 distinct service regions, called Veterans Integrated Services Network (VISN), that provide funding and care to the systems 1,293 medical centers and their associated clinics. Funding for each VISN is based on the anticipated number of Veterans enrolled in care within the covered region. When a VISN sees a large influx of number of Veterans, the funding levels for that region will increase proportionally, while other areas may see a decrease (especially if they are losing Veteran population). As of 2021, the Desert Pacific Network (VISN 22) was the largest region by population, with over 1.7 million total veterans (2018 estimate), while the Pacific Northwest Network (VISN 20) is the largest by geography -- 817,417 sq mi (2,117,100 km^{2}), including the highly rural state of Alaska.

Doctors who work in the VHA system are typically paid less in core compensation than their counterparts in private practice. However, VHA compensation includes benefits not generally available to doctors in private practice, such as lesser threat of malpractice lawsuits, freedom from billing and insurance company payment administration, and the availability of the government's open-source electronic records system VistA. Currently the VHA is experiencing a physician shortage and as of 2018 10% of jobs in the VHA remain unfilled. This shortage can be especially harmful to veterans as a quarter of veterans live in rural areas, which are most vulnerable to a shortage since they are already isolated and it can be hard to get access to the healthcare they need. However, since 2018, these shortages have been decreasing steadily, with the greatest need being mental health providers and nursing corps.

== Funding ==
The funding the VA receives is split into mandatory, which is an amount of spending dictated by law, and discretionary spending, which is spending that can be adjusted year to year. VHA's budget is part of the discretionary spending and is by far the largest portion of the department, reaching nearly 90% of the department's annual amount allocated annually by Congress in FY2022. For FY2022, the department's budget requested a total of $269.9 billion USD, of which $97.5 billion USD was allocated for various VHA programs, including $58.8 billion to support direct care in VA facilities, and $23.4 billion in support of community care claims. This was an increase of 10% over the FY 2021 appropriations, which were under $250 billion USD.

== Initiatives ==
The VHA has expanded its outreach efforts to include men and women veterans and homeless veterans.

The VHA, through its academic affiliations, has helped train thousands of physicians, dentists, and other health professionals. Several newer VA medical centers have been purposely located adjacent to medical schools.

The VHA support for research and residency/fellowship training programs has made the VA system a leader in the fields of geriatrics, spinal cord injuries, Parkinson's disease VA.gov | Veterans Affairs, and palliative care.

The VHA has initiatives in place to provide a "seamless transition" to newly discharged veterans transitioning from Department of Defense health care to VA care for conditions incurred in the Iraq War or war in Afghanistan.

The Veterans Health Administration Office of Research and Development's research into developing better-functioning prosthetic limbs, and treatment of PTSD are also heralded. The VHA has devoted many years of research into the health effects of the herbicide Agent Orange used by military forces in the Vietnam War.

The VHA has also adopted Boston University's Project RED program, designed to improve the discharge process for veterans in hopes that, by educating patients, the VHA will experience a reduced number of readmission among veterans and provide more information on telerehabilitation.

=== Use of electronic records ===
VHA is especially praised for its efforts in developing a low cost open source electronic medical records system VistA which can be accessed remotely (with secure passwords) by health care providers. With this system, patients and nurses are given bar-coded wristbands, and all medications are bar-coded as well. Nurses are given wands, which they use to scan themselves, the patient, and the medication bottle before dispensing drugs. This helps prevent four of the most common dispensing errors: wrong med, wrong dose, wrong time, and wrong patient. The system, which has been adopted by all veterans' hospitals and clinics and continuously improved by users, has cut the number of dispensing errors in half at some facilities and saved thousands of lives.

At some VHA medical facilities, doctors use wireless laptops, putting in information and getting electronic signatures for procedures. Doctors can call up patient records, order prescriptions, view X-rays or graph a chart of risk factors and medications to decide treatments. Patients have a home page that have boxes for allergies and medications, records every visit, call and note, and issues prompts reminding doctors to make routine checks. This technology has helped the VHA achieve cost controls and care quality that the majority of private providers cannot achieve. The Veterans Health Administration Office of Research and Development's research into developing better-functioning prosthetic limbs, and treatment of PTSD are also heralded. The VHA has devoted many years of research into the health effects of the herbicide Agent Orange used by military forces in Vietnam.

== Services ==
=== Eligibility ===
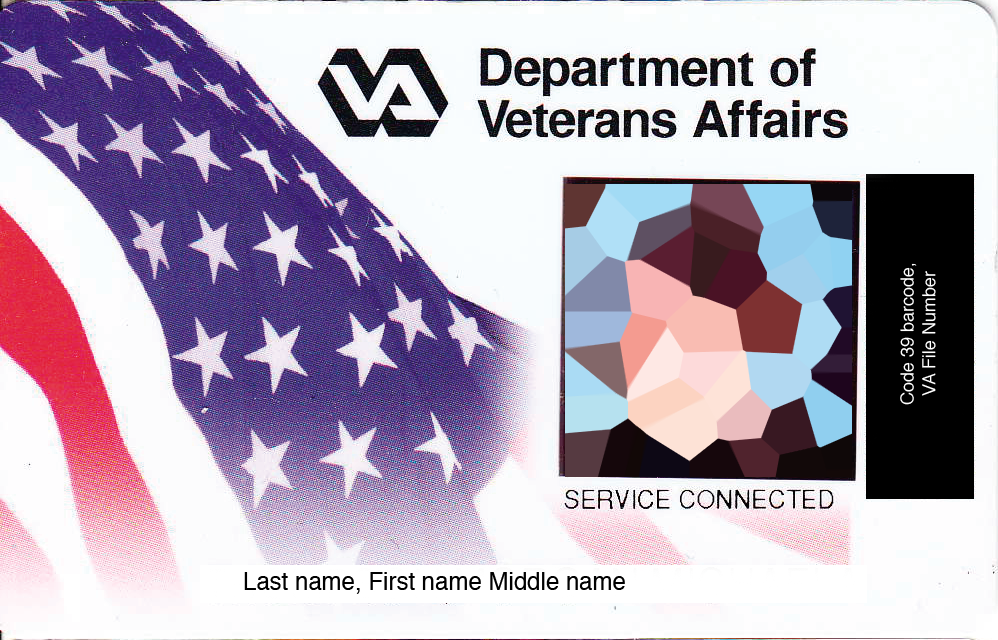
A VA Veteran identification VIC card for Veterans eligible for VA health care benefits

To be eligible for VA health care benefit programs one must have served in the active military, naval or air service and separated under any condition other than dishonorable. Current and former members of the Reserves or National Guard who were called to active duty (other than for training only) by a federal order and completed the full period for which they were called or ordered to active duty also may be eligible for VA health care.

The minimum duty requirements are that veterans who enlisted after September 7, 1980, or who entered active duty after October 16, 1981, must have served 24 continuous months or the full period for which they were called to active duty in order to be eligible. The minimum duty requirement may not apply to veterans who were discharged for a disability incurred in the line of duty, for a hardship or "early out." The VA determines the minimum requirements when the veteran enrolls for VA health care benefits.

To apply for entry into the VA health care system the veteran must complete VA Form 10-10EZ, Application for health care benefits.

Eligible veterans will receive a VA Veterans Health Identification Card (VHIC) formerly Veteran identification card (VIC) for use at all VA medical facilities.

By federal law, eligibility for benefits is determined by a system of eight priority groups. Retirees from military service, veterans with service-connected injuries or conditions rated by VA, and Purple Heart recipients are within the higher priority groups.

Current and former members of the Reserves and the National Guard who were called to active duty (other than for monthly drills and annual training) by a federal executive order may be eligible for VA health care benefits.

Veterans without rated service-connected conditions may become eligible based on financial need, adjusted for local cost of living. Veterans who do not have service-connected disabilities totaling 50% or more may be subject to copayments for any care they received for nonservice-connected conditions.

=== Medical Care ===
==== Primary & Specialty Care ====
Primary care is provided through what is referred to as Patient Aligned Care Teams (PACT). PAC Teams provide accessible, patient-centered care and are managed by primary care providers with the active involvement of other clinical and non-clinical staff. Veteran patients will be at the center of a "teamlet," which will include a primary care provider, RN care manager, LPN/health tech, and a medical support assistant (MSA). This teamlet is supported by a broader "team," which includes social workers, dieticians, pharmacists, and mental health specialists.

General care includes health evaluation and counseling, disease prevention, nutrition counseling, weight control, smoking cessation, and substance abuse counseling and treatment as well as gender-specific primary care, e.g., cervical cancer screens (Pap smears), breast cancer screens (mammograms), birth control, preconception counseling, Human Papillomavirus (HPV) vaccine and menopausal support (hormone replacement therapy). This care is provided mainly by VA-owned hospitals but may also be done in VA-owned community-based outpatient clinics (CBOC). VA hospitals are also capable of providing emergency care, although a Veteran can go to any hospital in an emergency.

VHA also provides management and screening of a number of chronic conditions includes heart disease, diabetes, cancer, glandular disorders, osteoporosis and fibromyalgia as well as sexually transmitted diseases such as HIV/AIDS and hepatitis. Rehabilitation, home care, and long-term care referrals are given to those in need of rehabilitation therapies such as physical therapy, occupational therapy, speech-language therapy, exercise therapy, recreational therapy, and vocational therapy.

VA also provides some home health care through its Skilled Home Health Care Services (SHHC) and Homemakers and Home Health Aide Services (H/HHA) programs. SHHC services are in-home services provided by specially trained personnel, including nurses, physical therapists, occupational therapists and social workers. Care includes clinical assessment, treatment planning and treatment provision, health status monitoring, patient and family education, reassessment, referral and follow-up. H/HHA Services are personal care and related support services that enable frail or disabled Veterans to live at home.

If the need arises, veterans are eligible for transplant service. VA has sixteen transplant centers across the country that provides solid organ transplants for most major organs, such as the heart, lung and kidneys, Patients will be referred to these transplant centers by their Primary Care Team. Travel to these centers is either free of charge to the Veteran or is reimbursed to them upon completion.

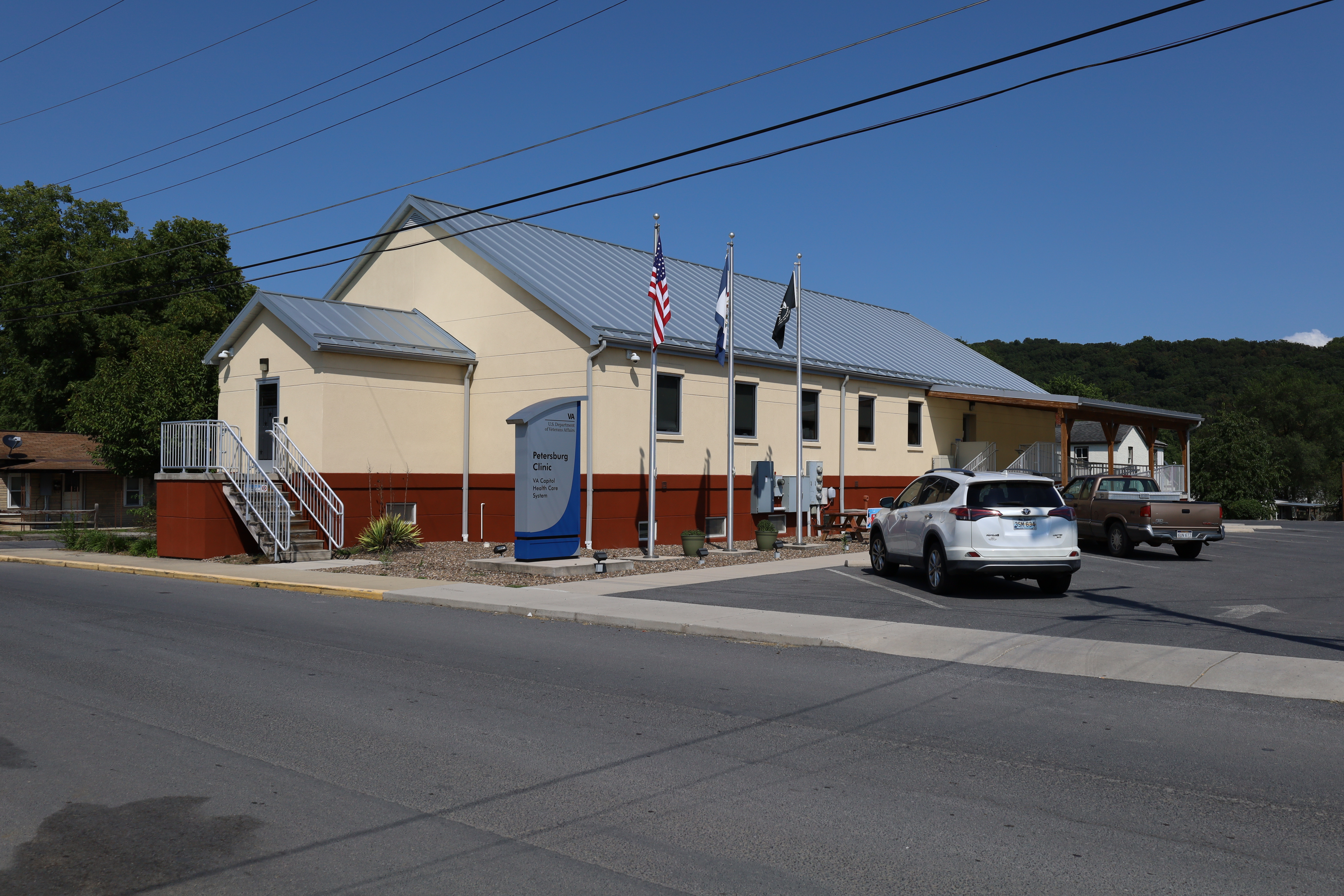
Outpatent clinic in Petersburg, West Virginia

==== Mental health ====
Mental health treatment includes evaluation and assistance for issues such as depression, mood, and anxiety disorders; intimate partner and domestic violence; elder abuse or neglect; parenting and anger management; marital, caregiver, or family-related stress; and post-deployment adjustment or post-traumatic stress disorder (PTSD). Veterans who may also have experienced sexual harassment or sexual assault, known as military sexual trauma (MST) during their service are also eligible for service. VHA provides free, confidential counseling and treatment for MST-related mental and physical health conditions. The percentage of patients with a mental illness was 15 percent in 2007. The percentage of veterans with mental illnesses has trended up. The VHA allocated an extra $1.4 billion per year to mental health program between 2005 and 2008. Mental health services in 2006 were evaluated as a part of the Mental Health Strategic Plan. The report concluded:

"Quality of care at the VA was shown to be better than the private sector. The VA had a higher level of performance then the private sector for 7 out of 9 indicators. In fact, they "exceeded private plan performance by large margins....Patients did not indicate improvement in their conditions. However, they had a very favorable opinions of their care.

In 2009, the VA implemented an initiative called Suicide Assessment and Follow-Up Engagement: Veteran Emergency Treatment (SAFE VET) to identify and treat veterans at risk of suicide by providing care coordination for outpatient mental health services and community-based support.

===== PTSD =====
Veteran Affairs utilization rates among Iraqi and Afghanistan-war veterans in the mid-Atlantic region with PTSD diagnosis between 2002 and 2008 were tracked using ICD-9 codes of those newly diagnosed. When compared to veterans already being treated, veterans new to VA treatment program were less likely to complete follow up visits, and had fewer medication-possession days (74.9 days versus 34.9 days); also long wait times hindered VA medical utilization. Limitations to this study included: type of treatment intervention was not delineated; only looked at PTSD treatment over a short period of time (180 days).

Another study found there was an increase in demand of the VA health system among veterans. Nearly 250,000 veterans were identified between 2001 and 2007; Iraq and Afghanistan war veterans had a 40 percent utilization rate, compared to only 10 percent of Vietnam veterans. Veterans were categorized into three groups: non-mental health diagnosis, non-PTSD mental diagnosis, and PTSD mental diagnosis. The most prevalent diagnosis was PTSD. The typical veteran affected by PTSD was male, from the Army or Marines, and a lower-ranked officer. Veterans with PTSD had a high utilization of the VA system at over 91 percent.

While this was a comprehensive study, there is more to be studied and understood about the effects of PTSD on returning veterans from active combat. A major limitation is that this study only captured the utilization of veterans within the VA health system. There was no data on veterans who sought medical services outside of the VA health system. We can have a better understanding of the mental health needs of veterans returning to civilian life. Moreover, it would be beneficial to explore and examine how utilization of mental health services is affected by the stigma that persists among veterans. Additional awareness of medical resources available to veterans can help to erase the stigma of seeking mental health treatment.

==== Women Veterans Programs ====
With the population of women veterans projected to rise from 1.6 million in 2000 to 1.9 million in 2020, the VA has worked to integrate quality women's medical services into the VA system. However, studies show that 66.9 percent of women who do not use the VA for women's services consider private practice physicians more convenient. Also, 48.5 percent of women do not use women's services at the VA due to a lack of knowledge of VA eligibility and services.

Women's care at VHA hospitals and clinics include reproductive health care such as limited maternity care, infertility evaluation and limited treatment, sexual problems, tubal ligation, urinary incontinence, and others. VHA is prohibited from providing either in-vitro fertilization or abortion services. Maternity and pregnancy care is usually provided in non-VA contracted hospitals at VA expense; care is usually limited to a mother. (VA may furnish health care services to a newborn child of a woman Veteran who is receiving maternity care furnished by VA for not more than seven days after the birth if the Veteran delivered the child in (1) a VA facility, or (2) another facility pursuant to a VA contract for services relating to such delivery).

==== Dental Care ====
For VA dental care a veteran must have a service-connected compensable dental disability or condition. Those who were prisoners of war (POWs) and those whose service-connected disabilities have been rated at 100 percent or who are receiving the 100 percent rate by reason of individual unemployability (IU) are eligible for any needed dental care, as are those veterans actively engaged in a 38 USC Chapter 31 vocational rehabilitation program and veterans enrolled who may be homeless and receiving care under VHA Directive 2007–039.

=== Non-Medical Programs ===
==== Family Caregivers Program ====
VA's Family Caregivers Program provides support and assistance to caregivers of post 9/11 Veterans and Servicemembers being medically discharged. Eligible primary Family Caregivers can receive a stipend, training, mental health services, travel and lodging reimbursement, and access to health insurance if they are not already under a health plan care. Each state has their own criteria and board members for approval, denial, and appeal.

As part of this program, VHA also will provide respite supportive care to Veterans on a short-term basis to give the caregiver planned relief from the physical and emotional demands associated with providing care. Respite care can be provided in the home or other institutional settings.

==== Residential Care ====
The Domiciliary Care Program of the Department of Veterans Affairs provides residential rehabilitative and clinical care to veterans who have a wide range of problems, illnesses, or rehabilitative care needs which can be medical, psychiatric, substance use, homelessness, vocational, educational, or social. The Domiciliary Care Program provides a 24-hour therapeutic setting utilizing a peer and professional support environment. The programs provide a strong emphasis on psychosocial rehabilitation and recovery services that instill personal responsibility to achieve optimal levels of independence upon discharge to independent or supportive community living. The VA Domiciliary Care Program also provides rehabilitative care for homeless veterans. Eligibility is extended to veterans whose annual gross household income does not exceed the maximum annual rate of VA pension or to veterans who the Secretary of Veterans Affairs determines have no adequate means of support. The copays for extended care services apply to domiciliary care.

VA also provides nursing home services to Veterans through VA owned and operated Community Living Centers (CLC), State Veterans' Homes, owned and operated by the states, and the community nursing home program. Each program has admission and eligibility criteria specific to the program. Nursing home care is available for enrolled Veterans who need nursing home care for a service-connected disability, or Veterans or who have a 70 percent or greater service-connected disability and Veterans with a rating of total disability based on individual unemployability. VA provided nursing home care for all other Veterans is based on available resources.

The Vet Center Program was established by Congress in 1979 in response to the readjustment problems that a significant number of Vietnam-era veterans were continuing to experience after their return from combat. In subsequent years, Congress extended eligibility to all combat veterans who served on active duty from previous conflicts. All community based Vet Centers provide readjustment counseling, outreach services and referral services to help veterans make a satisfying post-war readjustment to civilian life. Services are also available for their family members for military related issues. Vet Centers are staffed with small multidisciplinary teams some of whom are combat veterans themselves.

==== VA travel reimbursement ====
Veterans may be eligible for mileage reimbursement or special mode transport in association with obtaining VA health care services if the veteran has a service-connected rating of 30 percent or more, or is traveling for treatment of a service-connected condition, receives a VA pension, the veteran's income does not exceed the maximum annual VA pension rate, the veteran is traveling for a scheduled compensation or pension examination, is in certain emergency situations. has a medical condition that requires a special mode of transportation and travel is pre-authorized, as are certain non-veterans when related to care of a veteran (caregivers, attendants and donors).

=== Other Specialized Care ===
==== OEF/OIF/OND Care Management Team ====
The Operation Enduring Freedom/Operation Iraqi Freedom/Operation New Dawn (OEF/OIF/OND) Care Management Team helps returning service members achieve a smooth transition of health care services. A specialized OEF/OIF/OND care management team provides case management and care coordination for all severely ill, injured and impaired combat veterans, including those suffering from:

- Mental illness
- Traumatic brain injury
- Spinal cord injury
- Blindness
- Burns
- Amputation
- Terminal Illness/Injury
- Polytrauma
- Other conditions not mentioned above that cause significant impairment to daily living

==== Intimate Partner Violence Prevention ====
VHA also programs for women (and men) veterans who are victims of intimate partner violence (IPV). A 2017 study found that nearly one in five VHA women had experienced IPV in the preceding year, and research has shown that many military women reporting IPV experiences in the past year use VHA primary care as their main source of healthcare. VHA does not have an upper age limit for IPV screening, acknowledging that IPV is not limited by age. However, it is believed that early detection is helpful towards allowing victims to access much needed resources earlier and thus the U.S. Preventive Services Task Force suggests providers especially regularly screen women of childbearing age for IPV. The best care is provided when practitioners do not make assumptions about IPV on the basis of an individual's sexual orientation or other factors.

No matter one's age, there are chronic health risks associated with IPV victimization, for both men and women. Early detection is key to providing effective support systems to victims in the armed forces and reducing potential negative health consequences that are associated with such violence.

Barriers to disclosure of IPV to providers in the VHA include lack of universal routine screening, patients not being comfortable about disclosure, and individual concerns over potential negative consequences on benefits or personal items, depending on how info is shared or used. Barriers to providing the most effective responses to IPV cases include providers lacking time and information to help, and untrained personnel creating more harm than good.

== Evaluations ==
"Patients routinely rank the veterans system above the alternatives", according to the American Customer Satisfaction Index. In 2008, the VHA got a satisfaction rating of 85 for inpatient treatment, compared with 77 for private hospitals. In the same report VHA outpatient care scored 3 points higher than for private hospitals.

"As compared with the Medicare fee-for-service program, the VA performed significantly better on all 11 similar quality indicators for the period from 1997 through 1999. In 2000, the VA outperformed Medicare on 12 of 13 indicators."

A study that compared VHA with commercial managed care systems in their treatment of diabetes patients found that in all seven measures of quality, the VHA provided better care.

A RAND Corporation study in 2004 concluded that the VHA outperforms all other sectors of American health care in 294 measures of quality. Patients from the VHA scored significantly higher for adjusted overall quality, chronic disease care, and preventive care, but not for acute care.

A Harvard Medical School-led study shows that cancer care provided by the Veterans Health Administration for men 65 years and older is at least as good as, and by some measures better than, Medicare-funded fee-for-service care obtained through the private sector.

== Controversies ==
=== Coronavirus (COVID-19) ===
In the midst of the coronavirus disease 2019 (COVID-19) outbreak, 5,000,000 masks meant for hospitals of the Veterans Health Administration were seized by FEMA and redirected to the Strategic National Stockpile, stated Richard Stone, Executive in Charge, Veterans Health Administration. After an appeal from Veterans Affairs Secretary Robert Wilkie to FEMA, the agency provided the VA with 500,000 masks.

According to documents obtained by BuzzFeed News, at VA's Greater LA Healthcare System, medical personnel caring for patients who had tested positive for COVID-19 would receive only a single surgical mask per shift rather than the N95 respirators recommended by the Centers for Disease Control and Prevention. Those working in parts of the hospital without positive COVID-19 cases would be issued only a single surgical mask each week. The American Federation of Government Employees (AFGE) has filed an Occupational Safety and Health Administration (OSHA) complaint with the Department of Labor regarding safety or health hazards at VA facilities.

Veterans Affairs lists current statistics on confirmed infections and deaths due to COVID-19. As of May 5, 2020, VA has 9,771 confirmed cases and 771 deaths.

=== Under second Trump administration ===
New policies, implemented under the second Trump administration in response to an executive order, allow VA medical staff to decline care for patients based on personal characteristics, marital status, and political affiliation.

== See also ==
- Veterans benefits for post-traumatic stress disorder in the United States
- EBenefits
- Gerontology
- Rehabilitation Research and Development Service
