= Vietnam veteran =

Soldiers who served during the Vietnam War

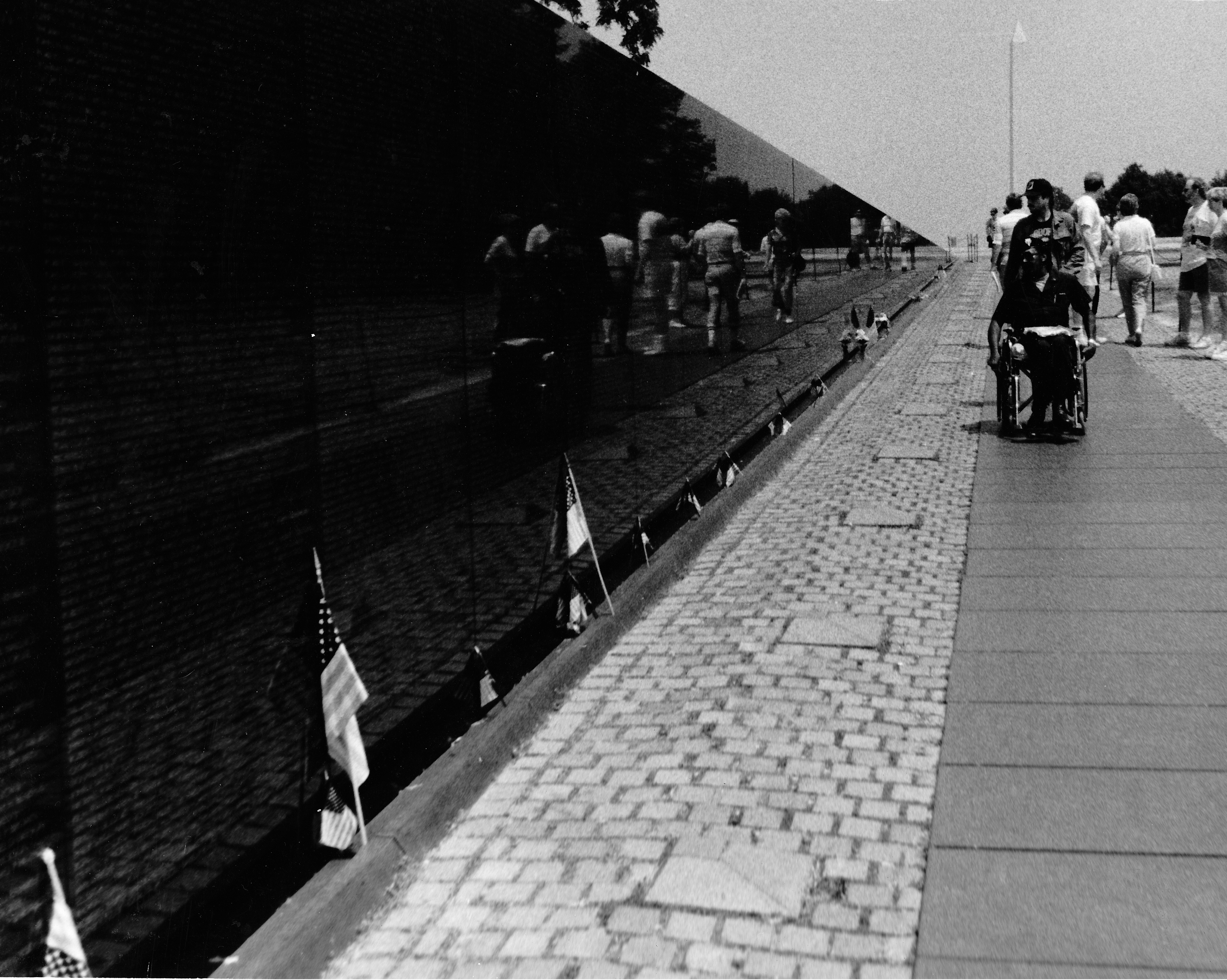
The Vietnam Veterans Memorial in Washington D.C., with a veteran in a wheelchair to the right

A Vietnam veteran is an individual who performed active ground, naval, or air service in the Republic of Vietnam, or served the country as a nurse during the Vietnam War.

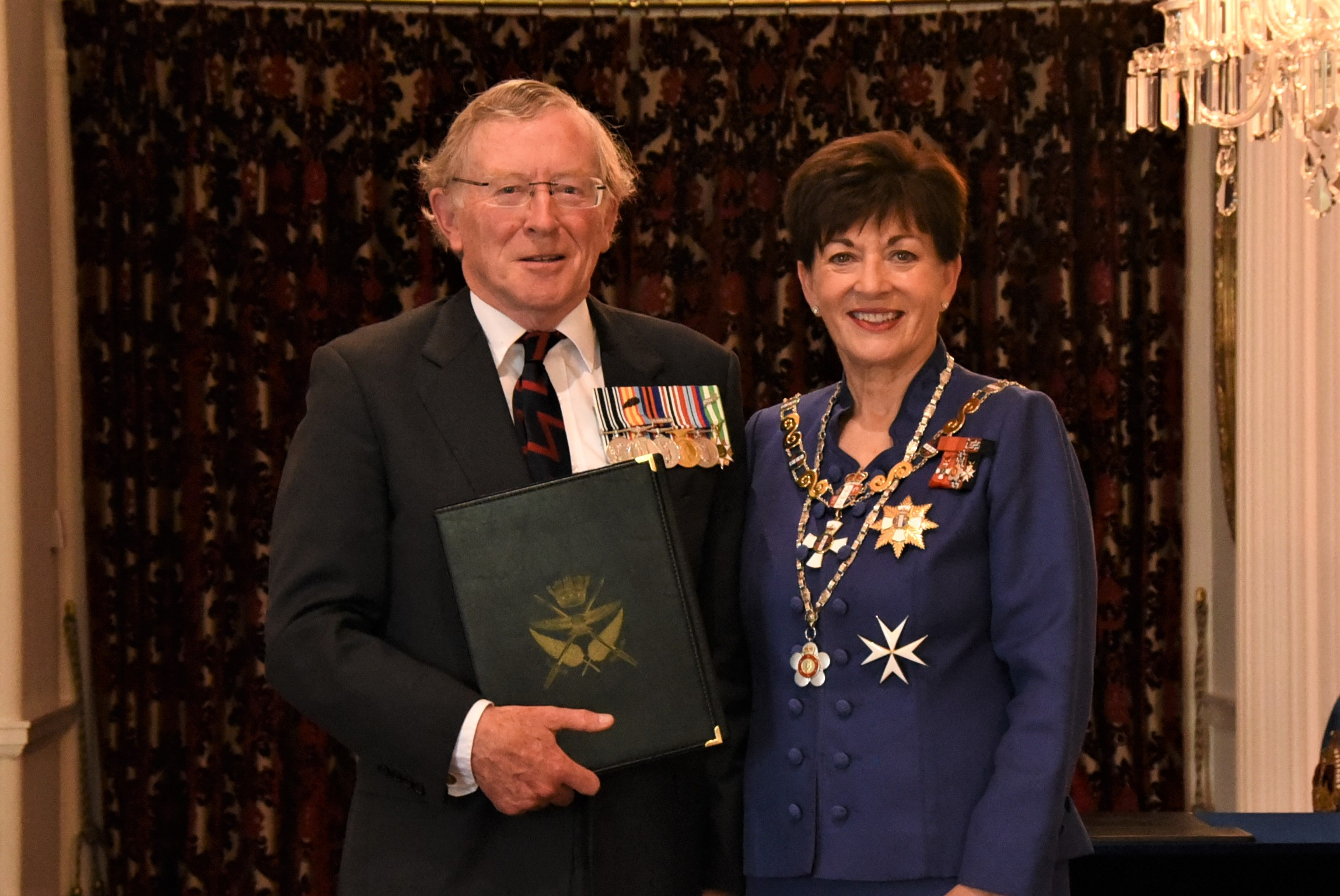
New Zealand Army veteran Rob Munro (left), receiving a Mention-in-dispatch award from Governor-General Patsy Reddy for action in Vietnam.

The term has been used to describe veterans who served in the armed forces of South Vietnam, the United States Armed Forces, and other South Vietnam–backed allies, whether or not they were stationed in Vietnam during their service. However, the more common usage distinguishes between those who served "in-country" and those who did not serve in Vietnam by referring to the "in-country" veterans as "Vietnam veterans" and the others as "Vietnam-era veterans." Regardless, the U.S. government officially refers to all as "Vietnam-era veterans."

In the United States, the term "Vietnam veteran" is not typically used in relation to members of the People's Army of Vietnam or the Viet Cong (also known as the National Liberation Front) due to the United States' alliance with South Vietnamese forces.

However, in many parts of east and southeast Asia, the term "Vietnam veteran" may also apply to allies of the North Vietnamese, including the People's Army of Vietnam, the Viet Cong (National Liberation Front), the People's Liberation Army of China, and the Korean People's Army of North Korea.

== South Vietnamese veterans ==
While the exact numbers are not entirely known, it is estimated that several million served in the South Vietnamese armed forces, the vast majority in the Army of the Republic of Vietnam (ARVN). From 1969 to 1971, there were around 22,000 ARVN combat deaths per year. The army reached its peak strength of about 1,000,000 soldiers in 1972. The official number of South Vietnamese personnel killed in action was 220,357.

Following the North Vietnamese victory on April 30, 1975, South Vietnamese veterans were arrested and detained in labor camps in desolate areas. The veterans and their families were detained without trial for decades at a time. After being released, they faced significant discrimination from the Communist government. A significant proportion of the surviving South Vietnamese veterans left the country for Western countries including the United States and Australia, either by or through the Humanitarian Operation (HO).

== U.S. veterans ==
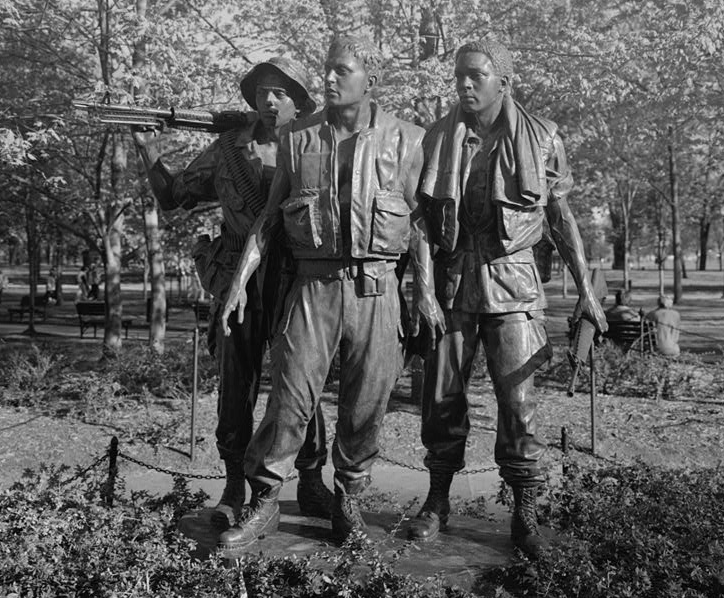
The Frederick Hart bronze statue Three Soldiers at the Vietnam Veterans Memorial in Washington D.C.

According to the U.S. Department of Labor, the Vietnam Era Veterans' Readjustment Assistance Act of 1974 (VEVRAA) states, "A Vietnam era veteran" is a person who:

- served on active duty anywhere in the world for a period of 180+ days, any part of which occurred between August 5, 1964, and May 7, 1975, and was discharged or released with anything other than a dishonorable discharge;
- was discharged or released from active duty for a service-connected disability if any part of such active duty was performed between August 5, 1964, and May 7, 1975."

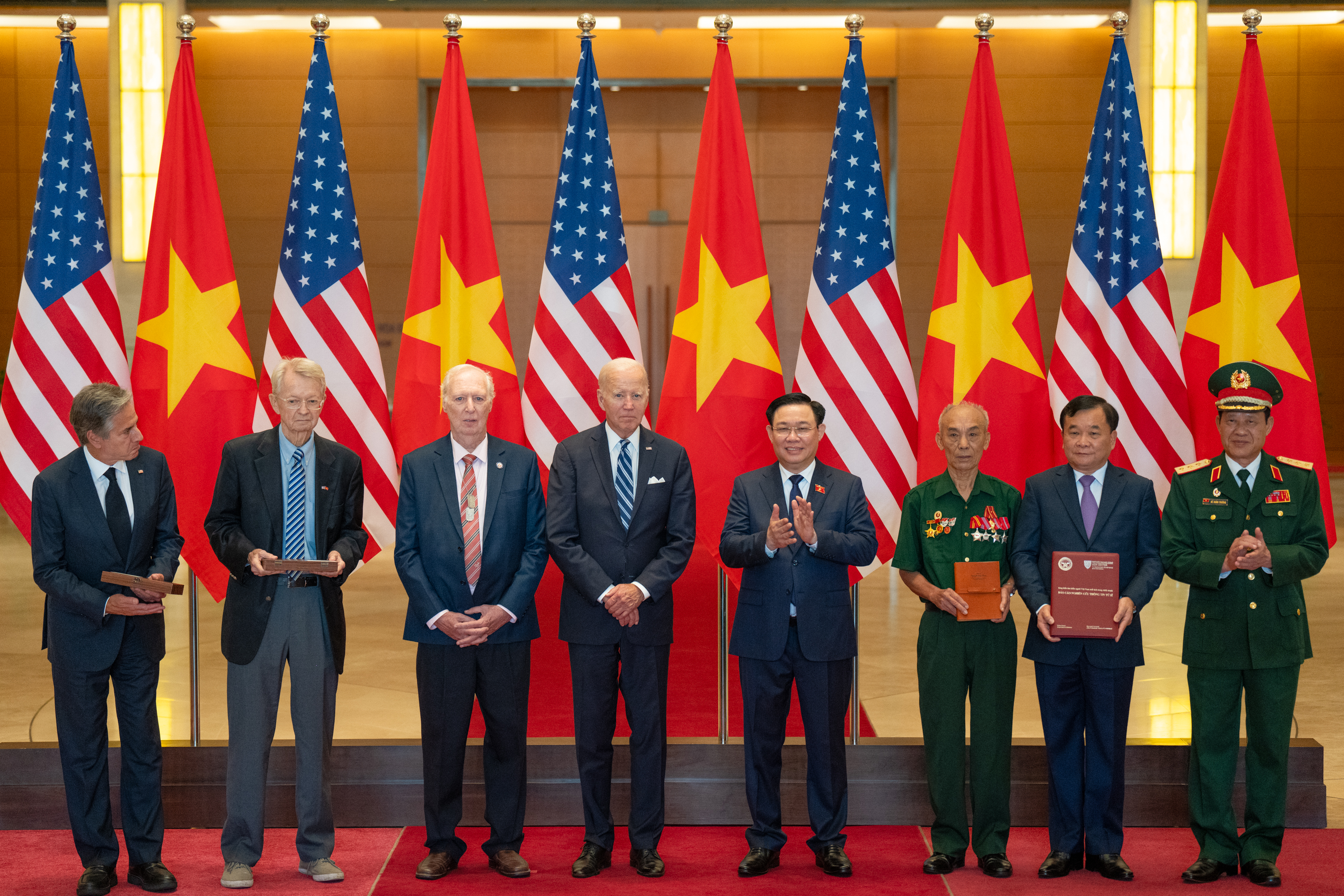
President of the United States Joe Biden and Chairman of the National Assembly of Vietnam Vương Đình Huệ presided over an exchange of artifacts ceremony between Vietnamese and American veterans in 2023.

In 2004, the U.S. Census Bureau reported there were 8.2 million Vietnam-era veterans who were living in the United States, with 2.59 million of them being reported to have actually served "in-country." More than 58,000 U.S. military personnel died as a result of the conflict. That includes deaths from all categories including deaths while missing, captured, non-hostile deaths, homicides, and suicides. The Department of Veterans Affairs recognizes veterans that served in the country, then known as the Republic of Vietnam, from February 28, 1961, to May 7, 1975, as being eligible for such programs as the department's Readjustment Counseling Services program, also known as the Vet Centers. The Vietnam War was the last American war in which the U.S. government employed conscription.

American servicemen who served between January 9, 1962, and May 7, 1975, are presumed to have been exposed to herbicides, such as Agent Orange.

=== PTSD ===
Many Vietnam veterans suffered from post-traumatic stress disorder (PTSD) in unprecedented numbers, with PTSD affecting as many as 15.2% of Vietnam veterans. The condition became a focus of clinical study in the 1980s, including The Trauma of War: Stress and Recovery in Viet Nam Veterans (1985), which described post-traumatic stress disorder in Vietnam veterans through clinical cases and discussed approaches to treatment. Referred to as the first "pharmacological war" in history, the U.S. war in Vietnam was so called because of the unprecedented level of psychoactive drugs that U.S. servicemen used. The U.S. military had routinely provided heavy psychoactive drugs, including amphetamines, to American servicemen, which left them unable to process adequately their war traumas at the time. The U.S. armed forces readily distributed large amounts of "speed" (stimulants), in the form of Dexedrine (dextroamphetamine), an amphetamine twice as strong as Benzedrine, to American servicemen. Soldiers embarking on long-range reconnaissance missions or ambushes, according to standard military instruction, were supposed to be given 20 milligrams of dextroamphetamine for 48 hours of combat readiness. But this instruction for heavy drugs was rarely followed: the drug was issued, according to veterans, "like candies," with little or no attention paid to the dose and frequency of administering the drug. In the period 1966–1969, the U.S. military provided 225 million tablets of stimulants, mostly dextroamphetamine, according to a 1971 report by the Select Committee on Crime of the U.S. House of Representatives. According to a member of a long-range reconnaissance platoon, the drugs "gave you a sense of bravado as well as keeping you awake. Every sight and sound was heightened. You were wired into it all and at times you felt really invulnerable." Servicemen who participated in infiltrating Laos, a secret intervention by the United States in the Laotian Civil War, on four-day missions received 12 tablets of an opioid (Darvon), 24 tablets of codeine (an opioid analgesic), and 6 pills of dextroamphetamine. Also, those serving in special units departing for a tough, long mission were injected with steroids.

However, pumping the soldiers with speed and heavy anti-psychotics like Thorazine (chlorpromazine) came with a price that veterans paid later. By alleviating the symptoms, the anti-psychotics and narcotics offered temporary relief. However, these serious drugs administered in the absence of professional psychiatric supervision and proper psychotherapy merely suppressed the problems and symptoms, but veterans years later often experienced those problems untreated and amplified. This is a large part of the reason why very few servicemen, compared to previous wars, required medical evacuation due to combat-stress breakdowns, but PTSD levels among veterans after the war are at unprecedented levels compared to previous wars.

== US nurses ==
Between 1955 and 1975, around 7,000 American women travelled to South-East Asia to serve their country as nurses. These women were often young, and either followed their fathers, brothers or husbands to war, or went of their own accord, driven by their own beliefs or passion for medicine. 90% of these women were there voluntarily and were fresh out of nursing school, aged around 23. A few of the Army nurses were also men.
Once there, they were quickly exposed to harsh conditions (for which they had rarely been trained), such as 12–14 hour shifts, challenging weather conditions and mortar attacks. These circumstances likely triggered trauma in all of them and, as was later discovered, PTSD.

In the early 1970s, women who were able to return home were not recognised as veterans, as they had not been directly on the front line. This made it difficult, or even impossible, for them to readjust to normal everyday life. In the years that followed, however, Army nurses gained increasing recognition and were accorded the respect they deserved.

Nine nurses died in Vietnam, two of whom were male: Captain Eleanor Alexander, Second Lieutenant Carol Drazba, First Lieutenant Pamela Donovan, Lieutenant Colonel Annie Graham, Second Lieutenant Elizabeth Jones, First Lieutenant Sharon Lane, First Lieutenant Jerome Olmsted, Second Lieutenant Hedwig Orlowski, First Lieutenant Kenneth Shoemaker, and Captain Mary Klinker, USAF.

== Veterans from other nations ==
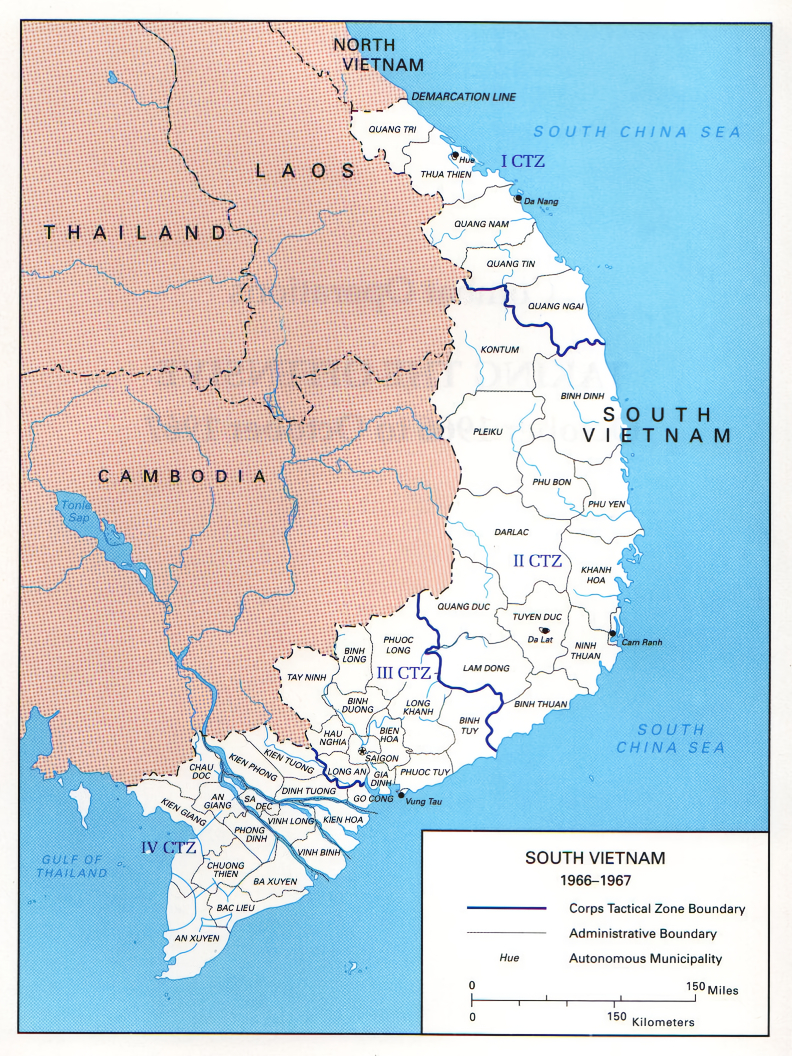
South Vietnam military regions, 1967

Nationals of other nations fought in the American-led anti-communist coalition, usually as armed forces of allied nations, such as Australia, New Zealand, Thailand, and South Korea, but sometimes as members of the U.S. Armed Forces. The Republic of China (Taiwan), Spain, and the Philippines contributed assistance in non-combat roles.

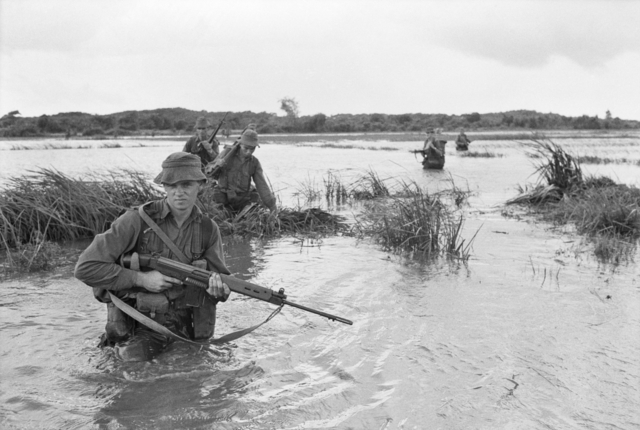
Members of the Royal Australian Regiment during a patrol in September 1967

=== Australian veterans ===
Australia deployed approximately three battalions of infantry, one regiment of Centurion tanks, three RAAF Squadrons (2SQN Canberra Bombers, 9SQN Iroquois Helicopters, and 35 SQN Caribou Transports), 2 batteries of Royal Australian Artillery and a Special Air Service Regiment (SASR) Squadron. The Royal Australian Navy (RAN) performed a variety of operational tasks at sea, ashore and in the air. The 1st Australian Task Force consisted of Army, Navy, and Air Force personnel and commanded all Australian operations from 1966 until 1972. 1st Australian Logistic Support Group (1 ALSG) was 1 ATF's ground support unit, composed of engineer, transport, ordnance, medical, and service corps units. Australian Army training teams followed the withdrawal of combat forces in 1971. According to the Australian Government Nominal Roll of Vietnam Veterans 13,600 members of the Royal Australian Navy, 41,720 members of the Australian Army, and 4,900 members of the Royal Australian Air Force served in Vietnam from 1962 to 1975. According to official statistics, 501 personnel died or went missing in action during the Vietnam War and 2,400 were wounded.

=== Canadian veterans ===
During the Vietnam era, more than 30,000 Canadians served in the U.S. Armed Forces; 110 Canadians died in Vietnam, and seven are listed as missing in action. Fred Griffin, a military historian with the Canadian War Museum, estimated in Vietnam Magazine (Perspectives) that approximately 12,000 of these personnel served in Vietnam. Most of these were Canadians who lived in the United States. The military of Canada did not participate in the war effort.

=== New Zealand veterans ===
Initially, New Zealand provided a 25-man team of RNZE engineers from 1964 to 1965. In May 1965, New Zealand replaced the engineers with a 4-gun artillery battery (140 men) which served until 1971. 750 men served with the battery during this time. In 1967 the first of two rifle companies of infantry, designated Victor Company, arrived shortly thereafter followed by Whiskey company. Over 1,600 New Zealand soldiers saw action in these companies, over 5 years and 9 tours. Also in 1967 a military medical team consisting of RNZAF, RNZN, and RNZAMC medical staff arrived and remained until 1971. (This team was additional but separate from the civilian medical team that had arrived in 1963 and left in 1975.) In 1968 an NZSAS troop arrived, serving 3 tours before their withdrawal. Most New Zealanders operated in Military Region 3 with 1 ATF, in Nui Dat in Phuoc Thuy Province, North East of Saigon. RNZAF flew troops and supplies, did helicopter missions (as part of RAAF), or worked as Forward Air Controllers in the USAF. Other New Zealanders from various branches of service were stationed at 1 ALSG in Vung Tau and New Zealand V Force Headquarters in Saigon. At the height of New Zealand's involvement in 1968, the force was 580 men. Along with the United States and Australia, New Zealand contributed 2 combined-service training teams to train ARVN and Cambodian troops from 1971 until 1972. New Zealand and Australian combat forces were withdrawn in 1971. New Zealand's total contribution numbered nearly 4,000 personnel from 1964 until 1972. 37 were killed and 187 were wounded. As of 2010, no memorial has been erected to remember these casualties. Like the United States and Australia, the New Zealand veterans were rejected by the people and the government after returning and did not receive a welcome home parade until 2008. The Tribute also included a formal Crown Apology. Despite high mortality rates among New Zealand Vietnam veterans attributed to Agent Orange, the New Zealand Government has been accused of ignoring the issue until only recently. The New Zealand documentary "Jungle Rain: The NZ Story Of Agent Orange and the Vietnam War" (2006) discusses the Agent Orange issue in depth.

=== South Korean veterans ===
South Korea deployed approximately two army divisions (Capital Mechanized Infantry Division, 9th Infantry Division), one Marine Corps Brigade (2nd Marine Brigade) and other support units.

Throughout the Vietnam War, South Korea sent approximately 320,000 servicemen to Vietnam. At the peak of their commitment, in 1968, South Korea maintained a force of approximately 48,000 men in the country. All troops were withdrawn in 1973. About 5,099 South Koreans were killed and 10,962 wounded during the war.

=== Thai veterans ===
Thailand sent nearly 40,000 volunteer soldiers to South Vietnam during the war and peaked at 11,600 by 1969. Units included the elite Queen's Cobras and the renowned Black Panther Division of the Royal Thai Army Volunteer Force. The Royal Thai Air Force provided personnel transport and supply runs in liaison with the Republic of Vietnam Air Force and the United States Air Force (USAF). The Royal Thai Navy also contributed personnel. The last of the Thai troops left Vietnam in April 1972, with 351 killed and 1,358 wounded.

=== Philippine veterans ===
The Philippines sent the "Philippine Civic Action Group" (PHILCAG-V), which entered Vietnam in September 1966, to set up operations in a base camp in Tay Ninh Province northwest of Saigon. The non-combat force included an engineer construction battalion, medical and rural community development teams, a security battalion, and a logistics and headquarters element. The team's strength peaked at 2068. Even though the role of PHILCAG-V was humanitarian, 9 personnel were killed and 64 wounded throughout their 40-month stay through sniper attacks, land mines, and booby traps. The team left Vietnam in 1969.

=== Chinese veterans ===
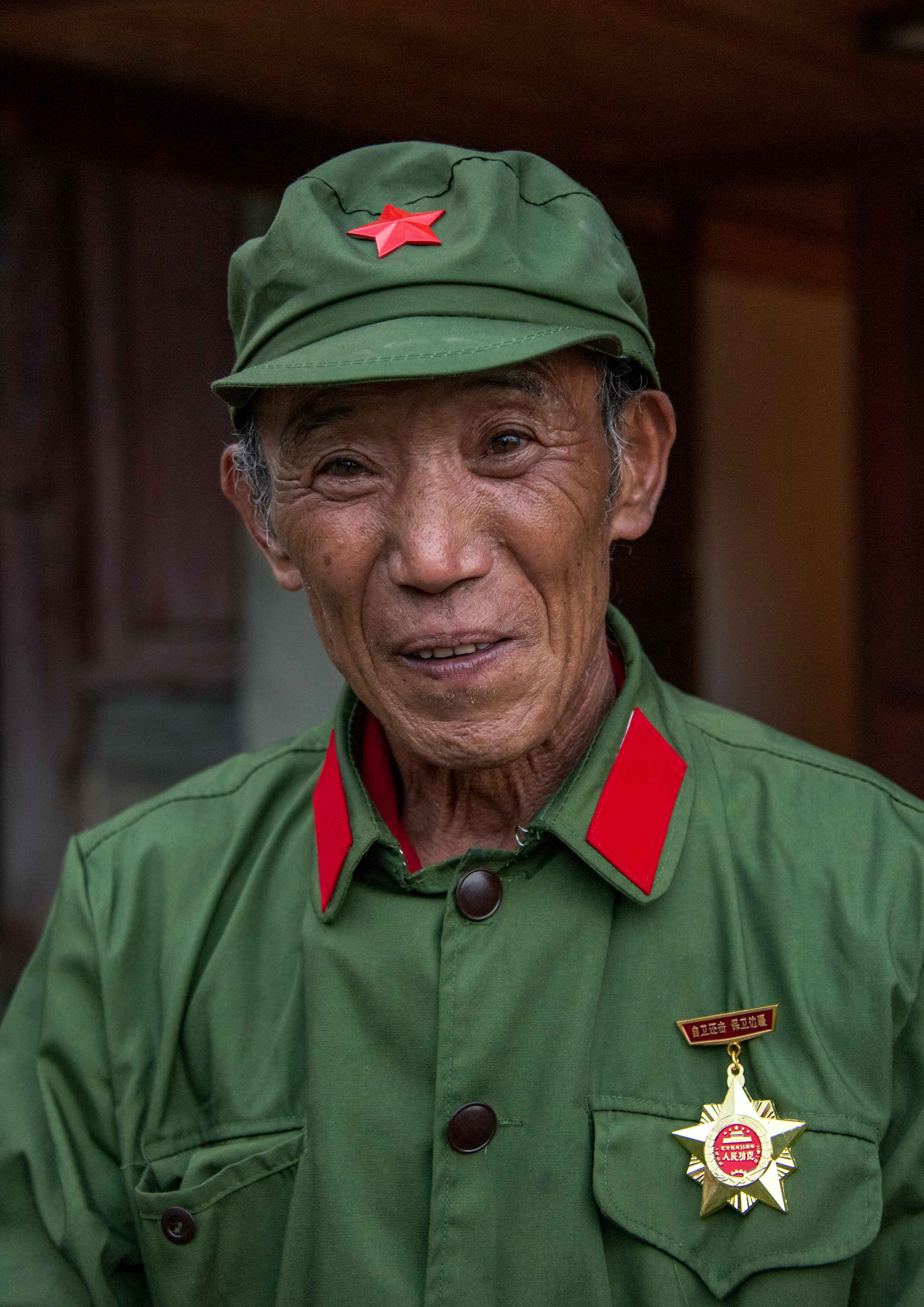
A Chinese Vietnam veteran of the People's Liberation Army

The People's Republic of China deployed the most foreign troops to assist North Vietnam, with nearly 320,000 troops of the People's Liberation Army. The logistical support provided by China allowed for continuous operations and guerrilla warfare tactics used by the North Vietnamese forces, regardless of American-led attempts to stop the flow of resources down the "Ho Chi Minh trail" to South Vietnam (Republic of Vietnam). American forces were unable to retaliate against Chinese targets, as it was believed that by doing so, America would escalate the already strained effects of the Cold War, and believed it would invite retaliation by the Soviet Union.

=== USSR veterans ===
The Soviet Union deployed roughly 4,500 soldiers, technicians, and pilots to Vietnam, surreptitiously, to help turn the war in favor of the North. Whilst their presence was never acknowledged by the USSR or any of its successor nations, Soviet involvement was an open secret. The Soviet Union's policy on the units deployed was to label them "military consultants." This deployment resulted in the development of the North Vietnamese air force, then it was formed against the United States' involvement in the war. From 1975 to 2002, forty-four Soviet servicemen were killed in Vietnam, mainly in aviation accidents. The military collaboration at Cam Ranh Base was continued by the later government of Russia until 2002.

== Stereotypes ==
There are persistent stereotypes about Vietnam veterans as psychologically devastated, bitter, homeless, drug-addicted people, who had a hard time readjusting to society, primarily because of the uniquely divisive nature of the Vietnam War in the context of U.S. history. That social division has expressed itself by the lack both of public and institutional support for the former servicemen that would normally be expected by returning combatants. In a material sense also, veterans benefits for Vietnam-era veterans were dramatically less than those enjoyed after World War II. The Vietnam-Era Veterans' Readjustment Assistance Act of 1974, as amended, 38 U.S.C. § 4212, was meant to try to help the veterans overcome the issues.

In 1979, Public Law 96-22 established the first Vet Centers, after a decade of effort by combat vets and others who realized that Vietnam veterans in America and elsewhere (including Australia) were facing specific kinds of readjustment problems, later identified as post-traumatic stress (PTS). Veterans, particularly in Southern California, were responsible for many of those early lobbying and subsequent Vet Center treatment programs. They founded one of the first local organizations by and for Vietnam veterans in 1981, now known as Veterans Village. Other notable organizations that were founded then included the International Society for Traumatic Stress Studies and the National Organization for Victim Assistance. The organizations continue to study and/or certify post-traumatic stress disorder responders and clinicians. To find closure, thousands of former American soldiers have visited and some have decided to move permanently to Vietnam to confront the psychological and physical remnants of the Vietnam War. They participate in the removal of unexploded mines and bombs, help people affected by Agent Orange, teach English to the Vietnamese and conduct Vietnam War battlefield tours for tourists.

== In popular culture ==
The Vietnam veteran has been depicted in fiction and film of variable quality. A major theme is the difficulties of soldiers readjusting from combat to civilian life. This theme had occasionally been explored in the context of World War II in such films as The Best Years of Our Lives (1946) and The Men (1950). However, films featuring Vietnam veterans constitute a much larger genre.

The first appearance of a Vietnam veteran in a film seems to be The Born Losers (1967) featuring Tom Laughlin as Billy Jack. Bleaker in tone are such films as Hi, Mom! (1970) in which vet Robert De Niro films pornographic home movies before deciding to become an urban guerrilla, The Strangers in 7A where a team of former paratroopers blow up a bank and threaten to blow up a residential apartment building, The Hard Ride (1971) and Welcome Home, Soldier Boys (1972) in which returning vets are met with incomprehension and violence.

In many films, like Gordon's War (1973) and Rolling Thunder (1977), the veteran uses his combat skills developed in Vietnam to wage war on evil-doers in America. This is also the theme of Taxi Driver (1976) in which Robert De Niro plays Vietnam veteran Travis Bickle who wages a one-man war against society whilst he makes plans to assassinate a presidential candidate. This film inspired John W. Hinckley to make a similar attempt against President Ronald Reagan. In a similar vein is First Blood (1982), which stars Sylvester Stallone in the role of John Rambo, a Vietnam vet who comes into conflict with a small-town police department.

Such films as Welcome Home, Johnny Bristol (1972), and The Ninth Configuration (1979) were innovative in depicting veterans suffering from post-traumatic stress disorder before this syndrome became widely known. In Born on the Fourth of July (1989), Tom Cruise portrays disenchanted Vietnam veteran Ron Kovic who, wounded in action and requiring the use of a wheelchair, leads rallies against the war. A more recent example is Bruce Dern's portrayal of a down-and-out veteran in the film Monster (2003). B-movies that feature Vietnam veterans with an emphasis on action, violence, and revenge, belong into the exploitation subgenre called "vetsploitation."

In television, the first Vietnam veteran to be a regular character in a U.S. dramatic series was Lincoln Case on Route 66. Case, played by Glenn Corbett, was introduced in 1963, long before the major U.S. buildup in Vietnam. "Linc" Case was initially portrayed as an angry, embittered man, not only because of his harrowing wartime experiences (which included being taken prisoner and escaping a POW camp) but also because of his grim childhood and continuing estrangement from much of his family. The show depicted his effort to make peace with himself and others.

In the 1980s and 1990s, service in Vietnam was part of the backstory of many TV characters, particularly in police or detective roles. The wartime experiences of some of these characters, such as MacGyver, Rick Simon of Simon & Simon, or Sonny Crockett on Miami Vice, were mentioned only occasionally and rarely became central to story lines. To a degree, writing in a Vietnam background provided a logical chronology, but also served to give these characters more depth, and explain their skills, e.g. MacGyver having served in a bomb disposal unit. China Beach, which aired in the late 1980s, was the only television program that featured women who were in Vietnam as military personnel or civilian volunteers.

Thomas Magnum of Magnum, P.I., Stringfellow Hawke of Airwolf, and the characters of The A-Team were characters whose experiences in Vietnam were more frequently worked into plot lines. They were part of an early 1980s tendency to rehabilitate the image of the Vietnam vet in the public eye.

The documentary In the Shadow of the Blade (released in 2004) reunited Vietnam veterans and families of the war dead with a restored UH-1 "Huey" helicopter in a cross-country journey to tell the stories of Americans affected by the war. Mr. Nelson, Did You Kill People? (2026), directed by Japanese filmmaker Shinya Tsukamoto, is a co-production between Japan, the United States, Thailand, and Vietnam. It follows U.S. veteran Allen Nelson, who suffers with severe PTSD following the Vietnam War. It won the Leoncino d'Oro Award at the 83rd Venice International Film Festival.

An example in print is Marvel Comics' Punisher (Frank Castle). Castle learned all of his combat techniques from his time as a Marine as well as from his three tours of combat during Vietnam. It is also where he acquired his urge to punish the guilty, which goes on to be a defining trait in Castle's character.

== See also ==
- Post-traumatic stress disorder
- Post-traumatic stress disorder and substance use disorders
- Vietnam Veterans of America
- Vietnam Veterans Memorial
