= Journal of Rehabilitation Research and Development =

- Discipline: Rehabilitation medicine
- Language: English

Publication details
- Former names: Bulletin of Prosthetics Research, Journal of Rehabilitation R&D
- History: 1964–2017
- Publisher: United States Department of Veterans Affairs (United States)
- Frequency: 10/year
- Open access: Yes
- License: Public domain
- Impact factor: 1.043 (2015)

Standard abbreviations
- ISO 4: J. Rehabil. Res. Dev.

Indexing
- CODEN: JRRDEC
- ISSN: 0748-7711 (print); 1938-1352 (web)
- LCCN: 84646003
- OCLC no.: 10988482
- Journal of Rehabilitation R&D
- ISSN: 0742-3241
- Bulletin of Prosthetics Research
- ISSN: 0007-506X

Links
- Journal homepage

The Journal of Rehabilitation Research and Development was a peer-reviewed open access medical journal published by the Rehabilitation Research and Development Service of the Veterans Health Administration Office of Research and Development. It covered research on rehabilitation medicine. It published ten issues in print and electronic formats each year. The journal's website contains the full archive dating back to 1964. The journal was established in 1964 as the Bulletin of Prosthetics Research, obtaining its latest name in 1983. In 2017, the journal announced that it would cease publication, to be replaced with a community organised through the open access publisher PLOS.

== Abstracting and indexing ==
The journal has been abstracted and indexed by:

- Academic OneFile
- Academic Search Premier
- CINAHL
- Current Contents/Social & Behavioral Sciences
- Current Contents/Clinical Medicine
- EMBASE
- Engineering Index
- PubMed/MEDLINE/Index Medicus
- Referativny Zhurnal
- Science Citation Index Expanded
- Social Sciences Citation Index

According to the Journal Citation Reports, the journal had an impact factor of 1.043 in 2015.
