= Flag and seal of the Department of Veterans Affairs =

Official flag and seal of the U.S. Department of Veterans Affairs

Flag of the United States Department of Veterans Affairs (VA)
- The flag of the Department of Veterans Affairs; adopted in 2012.
- Proportion: 1:1.9
- Adopted: 2012
- Design: The official seal of the United States Department of Veterans Affairs on a dark blue field. The flag typically includes a golden fringe. See design specifications and symbolism for more information.
- Designed by: David E. Gregory

The seal of the United States Department of Veterans Affairs (VA) is used by various cabinet members to authenticate official documents, awards, publications, certifications, reports, and regulations, including the secretary. The current seal, adopted in 1989, originates from the previously administered, Veterans Administration and Veterans' Bureau government agencies. When the Veterans Administration became the Department of Affairs, the former seal was changed accordingly to the presently used seal. The flag of the United States Department of Veterans Affairs (VA) embodies the seal of the department on a blue field.

When the time came for a redesign of the seal in 1989, a 225,000 employee-wide contest was held in order to find a suitable design. The final design originated from an Indianapolis Veterans Affairs Medical Center employee, who focused on direct traditional symbolism to convey the department's mission. When chosen, two changes were made to the design: one being the addition of the pentagon of yellow stars atop the bald eagle, and the other being the change of the words "USA" to "United States of America". The Veterans Affairs flag flies outdoors and indoors at VA department installments throughout the United States.

== Design specifications and symbolism ==
The Veterans Affairs seal incorporates many forms of symbolism: a bald eagle (the national bird) representing the American people and their respective freedoms, five golden stars in a pentagon representing the according branches of the United States military; U.S. Army, Navy, Airforce, Marine Corps, and the Coast Guard, (Note: The current seal does not include an additional star for Space Force, established by Former President Donald J. Trump in December, 2019.) each of which the department serves, and two flags (the Betsy Ross and National flag) representing America's history from the Thirteen Colonies to modern-day. A golden cord or rope binds the seal. The eagle additionally holds a golden tassel to represent veterans' sacrifices to the country. The colors of the Veterans Affairs seal borrow from the flag of the United States and the "natural colors of the earth", constituting the United States' commitment to those who have served. The words "DEPARTMENT OF VETERANS AFFAIRS" are present on the top of the seal, and "UNITED STATES OF AMERICA" on the bottom.

Seal of the United States Department of Veterans Affairs (VA)
- The current seal of the Department of Veterans Affairs. See design specifications and symbolism for more information.

Versions
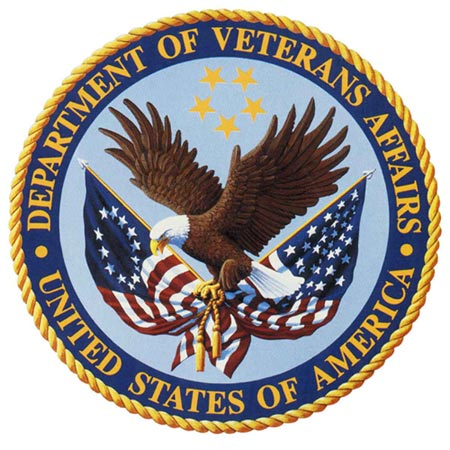
- An earlier version from 1989 - 2012 with shaded colors.
- Adopted: 1989
- Earlier version: 1989 - 2012 seal

Design specifications for the departmental seal.

Design specifications for the Veterans Affairs flag incorporating the official departmental seal.

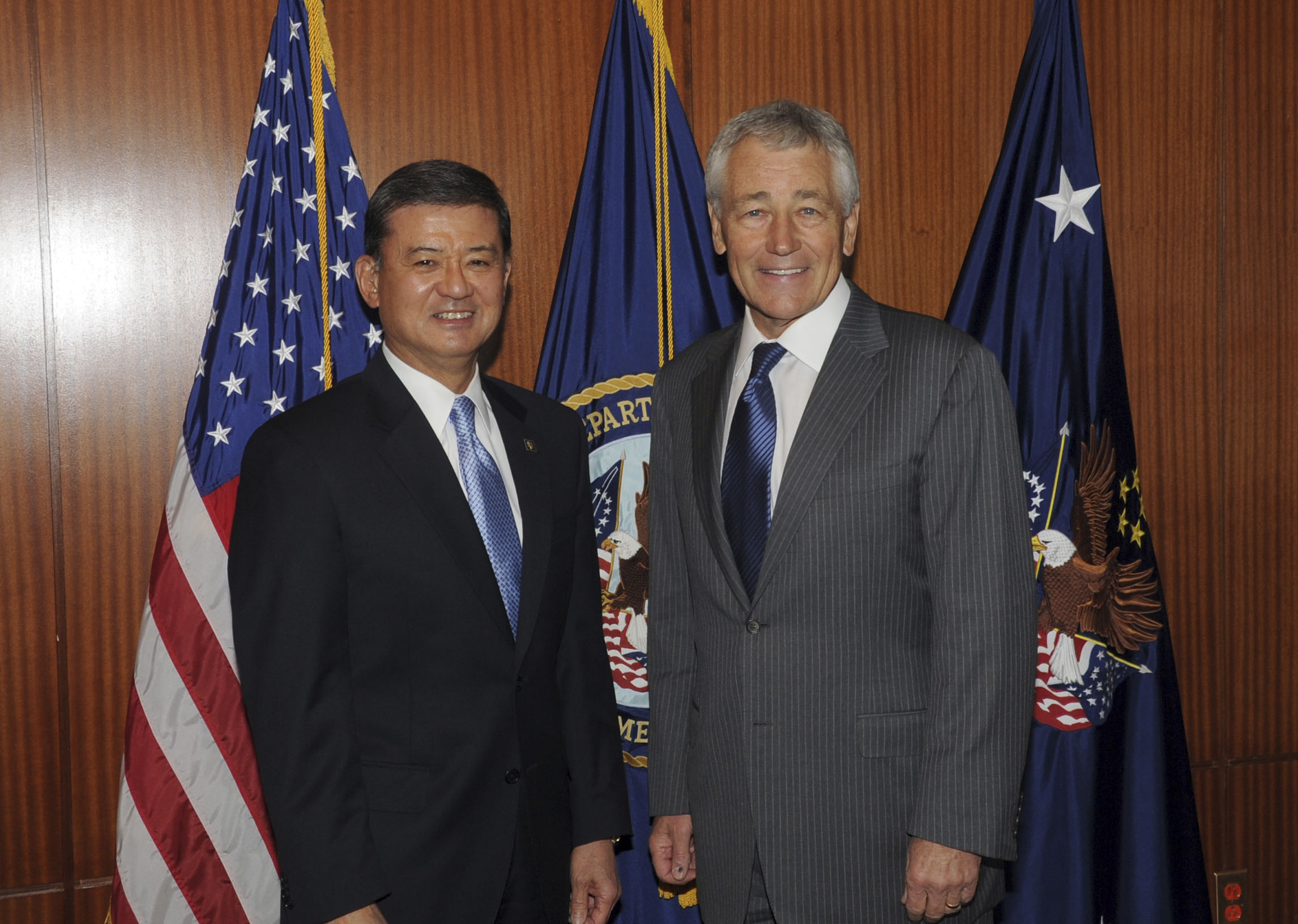
Former Secretary of Veterans Affairs, Eric Shinseki, and former Secretary of Defense Chuck Hagel at the Department of Veterans Affairs in Washington, D.C. The departmental flag is behind them, as well as the Secretary of Veterans Affairs flag, signifying the presence of the secretary.

The flag of the United States Department of Affairs incorporates the seal centered on an "Old Glory Blue" field. (Note: The flag is 24 inches (61 cm) in diameter for 3:5 and 30 inches (76 cm) for 5:8.) Veterans Affairs flags are typically fringed with gold.

When the seal was redesigned in March 1989 from the original submission, two changes were commissioned, one being the addition of a pentagon of yellow stars above or atop the eagle, and the other was the change of the words "USA" to its lengthened version, "United States of America".

== Use and guidelines ==
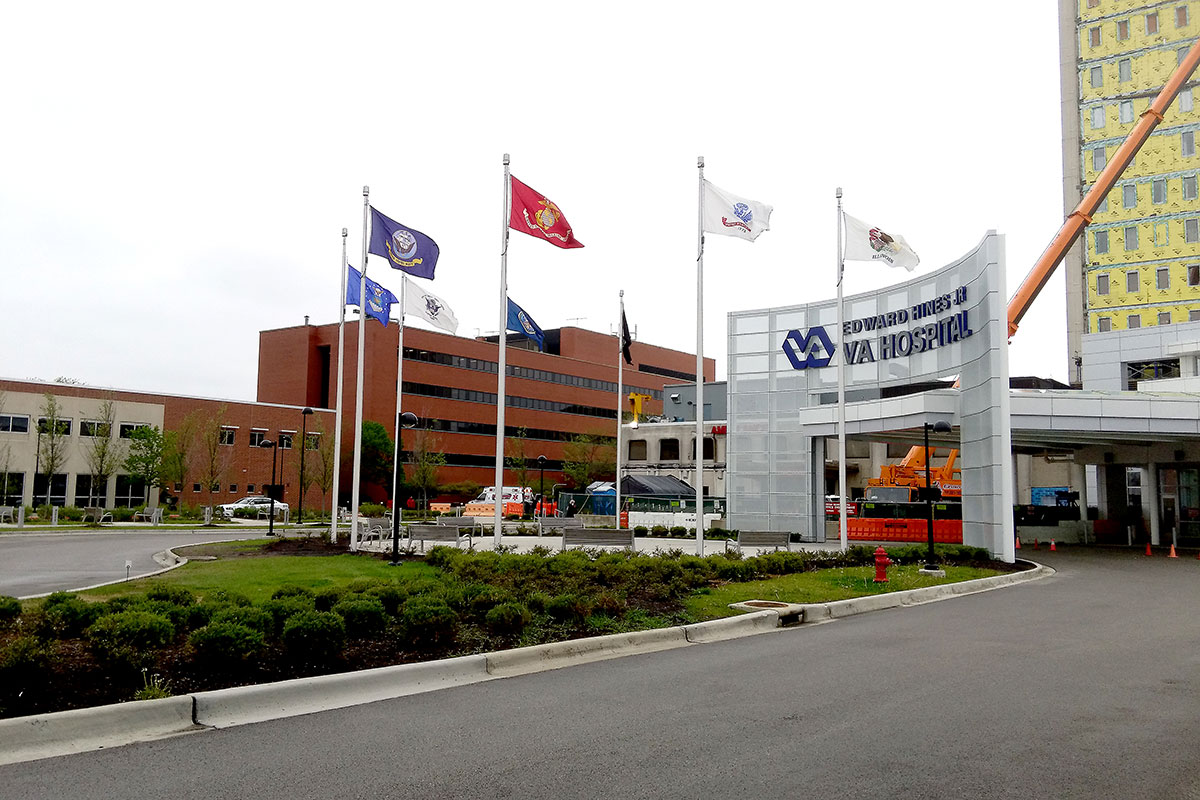
Edward Hines Jr. Veterans Administration Hospital in Maywood, Illinois, with the United States military branches' flags and Veterans Affairs flag.

As designated by Veterans Affairs, the seal may only be used in an official capacity. Use of the seal in other capacities such as on souvenirs, gifts, and calendars, toys, and matchbook covers is prohibited. Unauthorized usage of the seal in designated capacities may precede for criminal prosecution.

== History ==
=== Veterans Administration (1930-1989) ===
The seal of the Veterans Administration, created following President Herbert Hoover's 1930 decision to establish the agency, consisted of an outstretched bald eagle atop a shield with thirteen vertical stripes for the Thirteen Colonies. The 48-star United States flag along with the United States Jack was draped to the right and left of the shield, as well as a rifle (the United States Army) and an anchor (the United States Navy) diagonally behind the shield, with the bottom of the anchor overlapping with the bottom left of it. (Note: The Veterans Administration seal depicts a rifle and anchor to represent United States Army and United States Navy veterans. Further representation of other branches was added to the Department of Veterans Affairs newly designed seal in 1989.) The seal was inscribed on the outer portion with "VETERANS ADMINISTRATION". The date of the administration's creation, "1930", is inscribed at the lower portion of the seal. The seal is then surrounded by a golden rope.

In 1946, the administration's seal was modified: the two flags and belt motif were removed, and the anchor was repositioned. This version was continued in use to the creation of the United States Department of Veterans Affairs in 1989.

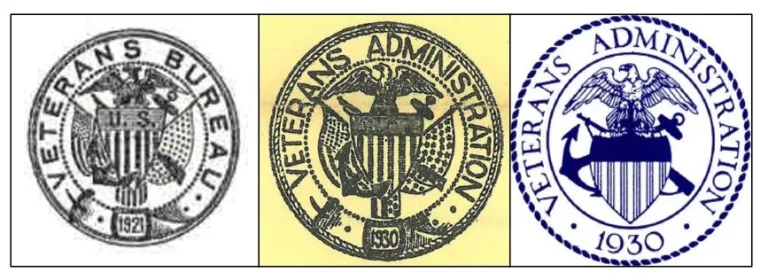
The respective historical seals of the Veterans Bureau and Veterans Administration.

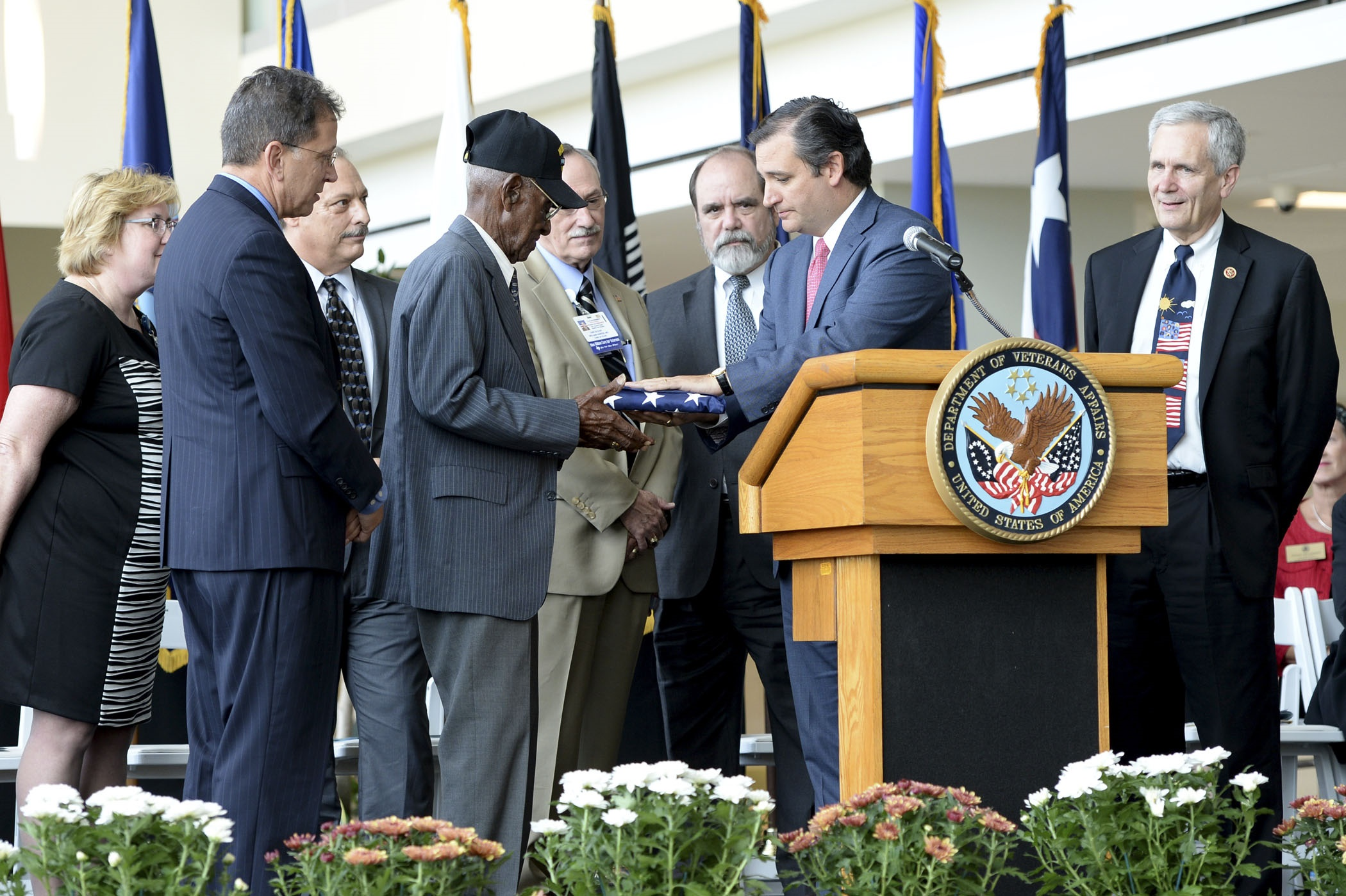
United States Senator Ted Cruz presents an American flag to World War II Veteran, Richard Overton, during the opening ceremony for the Austin Outpatient Clinic in Austin, Texas. The Veterans Affairs seal is present on the face of the pedestal.

=== Veterans Bureau (1921-1930) ===
The seal of the Veterans Bureau, the first organization of Veterans Affairs, was adopted in 1921 with the bureau's creation. The seal included an eagle atop a shield of thirteen vertical stripes for the Thirteen Colonies, with the Flag of the United States and Naval Jack shown accordingly to each side of the shield. An anchor, for the Navy, and a rifle, for the Army, stood diagonally in a cross behind the shield, with the lower end of the anchor overlapping with it. The words, "VETERANS BUREAU" lay on the outer rim of the seal in bold lettering. The bar atop the shield of the first version bore "U.S.", later removed. The Bureau seal also included "1921" instead of "1930", the year the Veterans' Bureau was founded.

== Secretaries of Veterans Affairs ==
Numerous other flags represent the according Veterans Affairs department ranks, including Secretary, Deputy Secretary, Assistant Secretary, and Under Secretary. These flags are flown in reference to their respective positions in the VA cabinet.

Flags of the Secretaries of Veterans Affairs

The flag of the Secretary of Veterans Affairs

The flag of the Deputy Secretary of Veterans Affairs

The flag of the Assistant Secretary of Veterans Affairs

The flag of the Director of the United States National Cemetery System

The flag of the Under Secretary of Veterans Affairs

=== Secretary ===
The flag of the Secretary of Veterans Affairs consists of a dark blue (navy) field, with the seal of the department without the outer rim and inscription. Four white stars dot the four corners of the flag. The flag is typically flown with a dark blue and gold tassel. One variation of the flag includes yellow stars rather than white.

=== Deputy Secretary ===
The flag of the Deputy Secretary of Veterans Affairs incorporates the seal of the department without the outer rim and inscription. The flag is scarlet, with four white stars, one in each corner. The flag is typically flown with scarlet and gold tassels. Another variation consists of the same design but with a dark blue field.

=== Assistant Secretary / Director of the United States National Cemetery System ===
The flag of the Assistant Secretary of Veterans Affairs / Director of the United States National Cemetery System consists of a white or light blue field with the departmental seal. The flag is typically flown with white or light blue and gold tassels. The Assistant Secretary has the white variation, while the Director of the National Cemetery System has the light blue variation.

=== Under Secretary (Health, Benefits, Memorial Affairs) ===
The flag of Under Secretaries of Veterans Affairs (and others of the same or related rank) includes a one-half, diagonally divided color scheme, the upper portion is scarlet, and the lower is white. In the center is the seal with no outer rim, aligned with four stars, two white in the red portion, and two red in the white portion. The flag is generally flown with scarlet and gold tassels.

== Notes ==
1. The current seal does not include an additional star for Space Force, established by Former President Donald J. Trump in December, 2019.
2. The flag is 24 inches (61 cm) in diameter for 3:5 and 30 inches (76 cm) for 5:8.
3. The Veterans Administration seal depicts a rifle and anchor to represent United States Army and United States Navy veterans. Further representation of other branches was added to the Department of Veterans Affairs newly designed seal in 1989.
