= Veteran identification card =

Veterans Identification Card
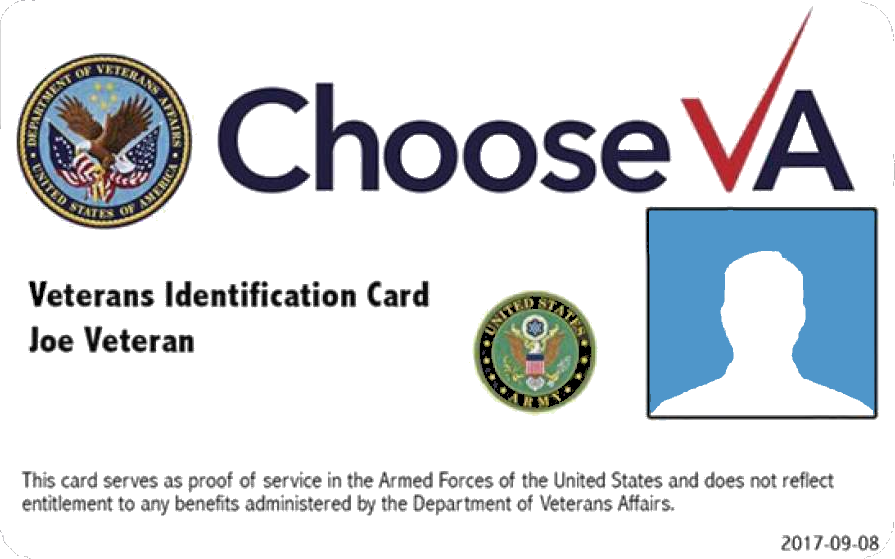
- A sample 2017-issued Veterans Identification Card (VIC) for a US Army veteran.

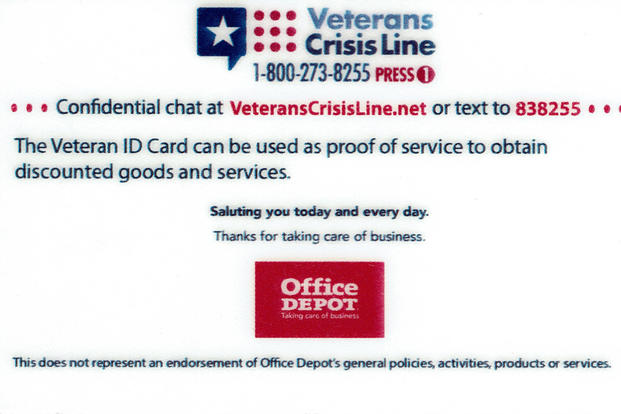
- The reverse of the card, bearing the logo of Office Depot (the card's manufacturer) and a telephone number for the Veterans Affairs crisis hotline.
- Issued by: US Department of Veterans Affairs
- First issued: January 2018
- Purpose: Identification
- Eligibility: US military veterans
- Expiration: Never
- Cost: Free

The Veterans Identification Card (VIC) is an identification card issued by the United States Department of Veterans Affairs (VA) to former military personnel as part of the Veterans Identification Card Act of 2015. The VIC allows veterans to demonstrate proof of service without the need for carrying their DD214, namely for discounts on goods and services offered by private individuals or organizations to veterans.

Until 2022, VICs were manufactured by Office Depot on behalf of the VA; the branding logo of the former is printed on the back of the card. It differs from a Veteran Health Identification Card (VHIC) or a DoD Uniformed Services or retiree ID Card as it cannot be used as proof of eligibility for any federal benefits and does not grant access to military installations.

== Eligibility ==
To qualify for a VIC, a veteran must have served in the US military (including the reserve components) and have received a discharge of honorable or general under honorable conditions. Those with an uncharacterized or unknown discharge may also qualify, provided a review by the VA to ascertain their eligibility determines they are eligible to receive one.

In 2022, the VIC was made digital only, with physical cards discontinued.
