= Rehabilitation Research and Development Service =

Research funding service

The Veterans Health Administration Office of Research and Development's Rehabilitation Research and Development (RR&D) Service funds research to improve or restore function in veterans who have become disabled because of injury or disease. As the population of Veterans with disabilities increases, in part, due to improved survival following catastrophic events, the need for research increases.

The fundamental goal of rehabilitation is to maximize functional recovery. Additional goals include integrating the Veteran back into the family, work environment, and society. This often means teaching compensatory techniques; implementing innovative therapy interventions; and providing adaptive equipment, advanced prosthetic equipment, and neural prosthetic devices.

== Program Scope ==
RR&D's areas of emphasis are broad and expansive, encompassing basic scientific research that has strong implications for translation into clinical practice, as well as rehabilitation strategies, interventions, and techniques, including prosthetic devices and the reintegration of Veterans into all facets of civilian life. Specific research areas include, but are not limited to, prosthetics, orthotics, orthopedics, musculoskeletal disorders, rehabilitation engineering, chronic disease, dementias and psychiatric disorders, sensory systems, communication disorders, spinal cord injury and dysfunction regeneration and restoration, neurological dysfunction, traumatic brain injury, vocational rehabilitation, disabilities as a consequence of aging, and rehabilitation outcomes.

== Organizational Units ==
=== Journal of Rehabilitation Research and Development ===
The Journal of Rehabilitation Research and Development (JRRD) is a peer-reviewed rehabilitation journal sponsored by RR&D. The journal is an international publisher of original research funded by both VA and outside sources. In support of the RR&D mission, JRRD disseminates research in 31 topic areas that will inform the treatment process, stimulate debate on healthcare challenges, and advance patient care.

=== Merit Review Program ===
The RR&D Investigator-Initiated Research Merit Review Program is the principal mechanism for competitive funding of VA rehabilitation research. The program coordinates an independent panel of scientists who evaluate research proposals and provide funding recommendations based on the scientific merit and feasibility of the proposed research and the significance and importance of the proposed research to the RR&D mission.

=== Centers of Excellence ===
RR&D Centers of Excellence (COEs) are specialized research units within various VA medical centers. The COE designation is awarded to facilities competitively, based on a scientific review of submitted proposals and the conformance with the following criteria: relevance of the proposed research to the Veteran population, capability of applicant to meet intended outcome of proposed research program, potential contribution of proposed research to the field of rehabilitation, long-term management of impairment, and impact on overall quality-of-life issues for Veterans with disabilities.

As of June 2010, there are currently 14 COEs nationwide. Funding for COEs is for 5 years.

== See also ==
- United States Department of Veterans Affairs
- Journal of Rehabilitation Research and Development
