= Veterans Health Administration Office of Research and Development =

U.S. government agency

Agency overview
- Formed: About 1925
- Parent agency: Veterans Health Administration, United States Department of Veterans Affairs
- Child agency: Biomedical Laboratory Research and Development Service, the Clinical Science Research and Development Service (including the Cooperative Studies Program), the Health Services Research and Development Service, and the Rehabilitation Research and Development Service, and as a number of ORD-Wide Programs and Funded Field Centers.
- Website: http://www.research.va.gov/

The Veterans Health Administration Office of Research and Development (ORD) is the research and development agency of the Veterans Health Administration in the United States Department of Veterans Affairs. The department focuses on biomedical and health care research for the care of veterans and wounded soldiers, and has a budget of $1.018 billion in the requested 2012 budget, in addition to $710 million derived from federal and non-federal grants from other agencies.

ORD performs intramural research in association with the VA hospitals, and over 70% of its investigators also provide direct patient care. Its achievements include research into prosthetic limbs and mental health issues such as substance use, post-traumatic stress disorder, and depression. It also publishes the Journal of Rehabilitation Research and Development.

The office has existed since about 1925.

== Departments ==
ORD consists of four "Research and Development Services", which are the Biomedical Laboratory Research and Development Service, the Clinical Science Research and Development Service (including the Cooperative Studies Program), the Health Services Research and Development Service, and the Rehabilitation Research and Development Service, as well as a number of ORD-Wide Programs and Funded Field Centers.

== Achievements ==
ORD's historical achievements include that VA researchers in the 1960s performed the first successful liver transplant. Three VA researchers have won the Nobel Prize in Physiology or Medicine: Ferid Murad shared the prize in 1998 for nitric oxide signaling in the cardiovascular system, and Andrew Schally and Rosalyn Yalow shared the prize in 1977 for studies of peptide hormones.
