= Vietnam Era Veterans' Readjustment Assistance Act =

1974 act of the US Congress

- Long title: An Act to prohibit employment discrimination against certain veterans, to require affirmative action in employment by federal contractors, and for other purposes.
- Acronyms (colloquial): VEVRAA
- Enacted by: the 93rd United States Congress

Citations
- Public law: Pub. L. 92–540: § 503
- Statutes at Large: 86 Stat. 1074

Codification
- Titles amended: 38 U.S.C. § 4212

Legislative history
- Introduced in the House as H.R. 12828 on February 1, 1972; Committee consideration by House Veterans’ Affairs; Senate Veterans’ Affairs; Passed the House on (Passed by voice vote); Passed the Senate on (Passed by voice vote); Signed into law by President Richard Nixon on October 24, 1972

The Vietnam Era Veterans' Readjustment Assistance Act of 1974 (or VEVRAA) is an act of the 93rd United States Congress enacted on 3 December 1974 related to employment discrimination against Vietnam-era veterans, disabled veterans, and any other veterans who served active duty time in a war event that qualifies for a campaign badge.

== Overview ==
The current version of the law requires that employers with federal contracts or subcontracts of $150,000 or more provide affirmative action to employ and promote qualified veterans who are recently separated, disabled, or who served on active duty during a war or in a campaign or expedition for which a campaign badge has been authorized.

If covered by the act, a veteran who believes that a contractor is not fulfilling its VEVRAA employment obligations may file a complaint with the Department of Labor’s Office of Federal Contract Compliance Programs.

A Vietnam era veteran was defined as a person who:

- Served on active duty for more than 180 days, any part of which occurred between August 5, 1964, and May 7, 1975, and did not receive a dishonorable discharge;
- Was discharged/released from active duty for a service-connected disability if any part of such active duty was performed between August 5, 1964, and May 7, 1975;
- Served on active duty for more than 180 days, as well as served in the Republic of Vietnam between February 28, 1961, and May 7, 1975.

The law now applies to any veteran who served on active duty during a war, including the Vietnam War and the Gulf War, which is defined as beginning on August 2, 1990, with no fixed end date.

A special disabled veteran is a person who is entitled to compensation under laws administered by the Department of Veterans Affairs for a disability rated at 30 percent or more. If it has been determined that the individual has a serious employment disability, or was discharged/released from active duty because of a service-connected disability, that changes to 10 or 20 percent.

As a part of affirmative action, federal contractors and subcontractors are required to list with the local state employment service all employment openings except for executive and top management jobs, jobs which the contractor expects to fill from within, and jobs lasting 3 days or less.
