= Department of Veterans Affairs Act =

Department of Veterans Affairs Act of 1988
- Long title: An Act to establish the Veterans' Administration as an executive department, and for other purposes.
- Enacted by: the 100th United States Congress
- Effective: October 25, 1988

Citations
- Public law: 100-527
- Statutes at Large: 102 Stat. 2635

Legislative history
- Introduced in the House as H.R. 3471 by Jack Brooks (D-TX) on October 13, 1987; Committee consideration by House Government Operations and Senate Governmental Affairs; Passed the House on November 17, 1987 (399-17); Passed the Senate on July 12, 1988 (84-12); Reported by the joint conference committee on October 3, 1988; agreed to by the House on October 6, 1988 (voice vote) and by the Senate on October 18, 1988 (voice vote); Signed into law by President Ronald Reagan on October 25, 1988

The Department of Veterans Affairs Act of 1988 (Pub. L. 100–527) changed the former Veterans Administration, an independent government agency established in 1930, primarily at that time to see to needs of World War I, into a Cabinet-level Department of Veterans Affairs. It was signed into law by President Ronald Reagan on October 25, 1988, but actually came into effect under the term of his successor, George H. W. Bush, on March 15, 1989.

This bill passed into law over the objection of some of President Reagan's fellow Republicans, who were committed to preventing the U.S. federal government from expanding further. Many Republicans along with most Democrats ultimately supported it on the basis that it was really more of a reorganization than an expansion of government as the new department was in reality going to be doing very few things that the former Veterans Administration had not already been doing. There was the further consideration that military veterans constitute a large and powerful voting bloc and could easily be offended at the perceived slight that opposition to the bill might have implied.
