= EBenefits =

eBenefits (sometimes referred to as "My eBenefits") was a web portal managed jointly by the United States Department of Veterans Affairs (VA) and the United States Department of Defense (DoD) to provide Service members, Veterans and eligible dependents the ability to manage their VA and DoD benefits, claims, and military documents online. The eBenefits portal offers two main services: a customizable workspace that provides personalized and secure VA & DoD information and more than 45 self-service tools and a catalog of links to military and Veteran benefits on other web sites. There is also a mobile eBenefits version that is accessible via mobile device or tablet. However, many Veterans have encountered trouble with the site regarding lack of updates or inaccessible information. The site is well laid out, but this is offset by the fact that many of the links take you to error messages.

According to VA, as of November 2012, more than 2.1 million Service members, Veterans and eligible family members are registered to use the eBenefits site. Since April 2010, there have been over 14 million views for pending disability claim status through the site.

VA's Veterans Benefits Administration (VBA) manages the eBenefits web portal with DoD. VBA is the agency responsible for overseeing VA programs that provide financial and other forms of assistance to Veterans, their dependents, and survivors. The portal supports VBA's Veterans Relationship Management System (VRM) initiative, a multi-year project whose goal is to improve the speed, accuracy, and consistency of the healthcare and benefits service and information that Veterans and their families receive from VA.

== Project history ==
The President's Commission on Care for America's Returning Wounded Warriors (also known as the Dole/Shalala Commission) recommended the creation of a web portal that would serve wounded, injured and ill Service members as well as Veterans, their families, and their caregivers. According to the Commission, the portal should provide a single-sign on, central access point to online benefits and related services. The Commission was established by U.S. President George W. Bush through Executive Order 13426 on March 6, 2007. As a result of the Commission's recommendation, the eBenefits site was inaugurated in 2009.
