= United States Department of Veterans Affairs =

Department of the United States federal government

- Seal of the Department of Veterans Affairs

- Flag of the Department of Veterans Affairs

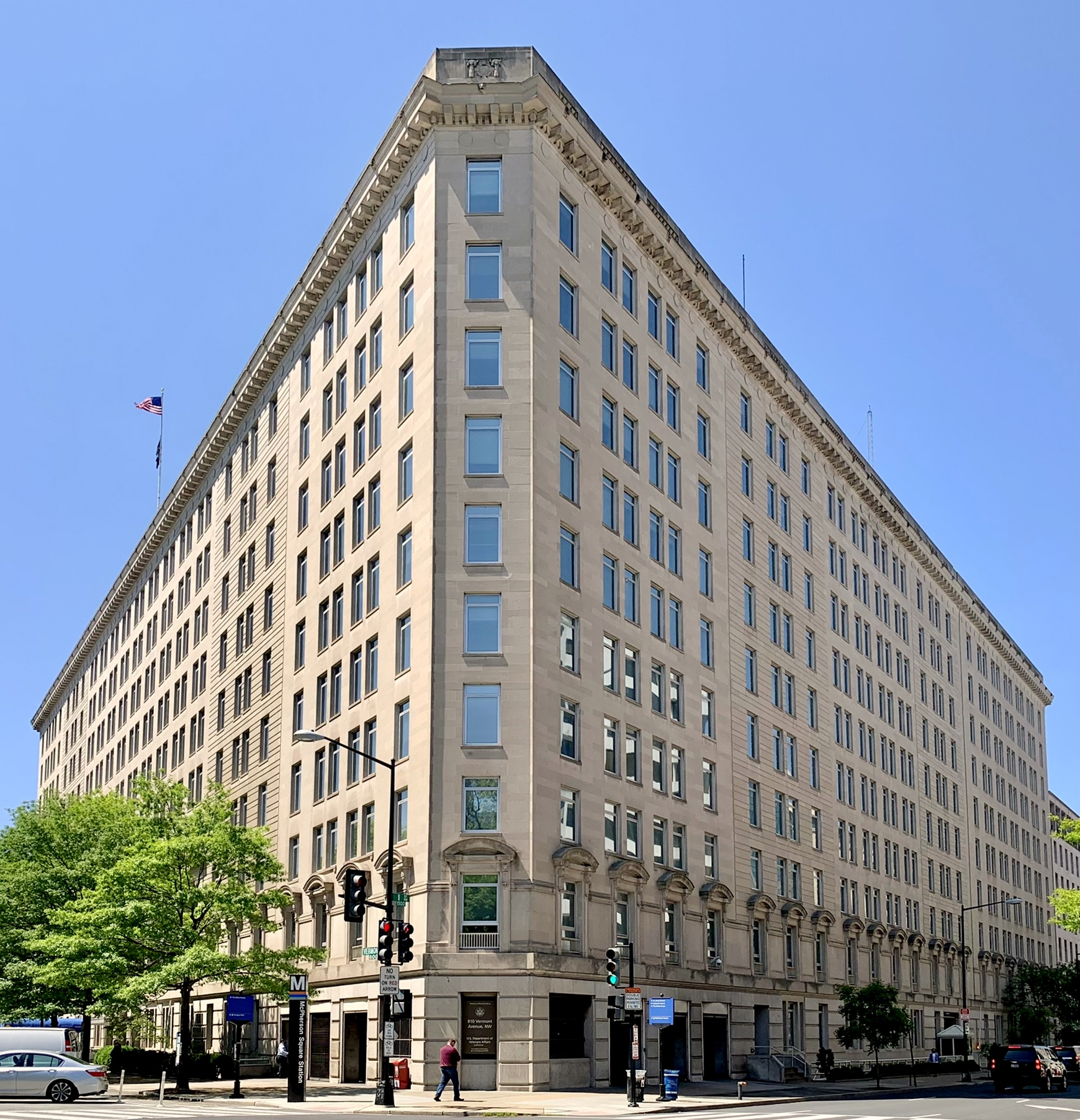
- Washington, D.C. Headquarters

Agency overview
- Formed: July 21, 1930; 96 years ago
- Preceding agency: Veterans' Administration
- Jurisdiction: United States federal government
- Headquarters: Veteran Affairs Building 810 Vermont Avenue NW Washington, D.C., U.S.; 38°54′04″N 77°02′06″W
- Employees: 412,892 (June 2020)
- Annual budget: FY 2024: $307.31 billion (appropriated); FY 2025: $339.51 billion (requested)
- Secretary responsible: Doug Collins
- Deputy Secretary responsible: Paul Lawrence
- Child agencies: Veterans Health Administration; Veterans Benefits Administration; National Cemetery Administration; Board of Veterans' Appeals
- Website: va.gov

The United States Department of Veterans Affairs (VA) is a Cabinet-level executive branch department of the federal government charged with providing lifelong healthcare services to eligible military veterans at the 170 VA medical centers and outpatient clinics located throughout the country. Non-healthcare benefits include disability compensation, vocational rehabilitation, education assistance, home loans, and life insurance. The VA also provides burial and memorial benefits to eligible veterans and family members at 135 national cemeteries.

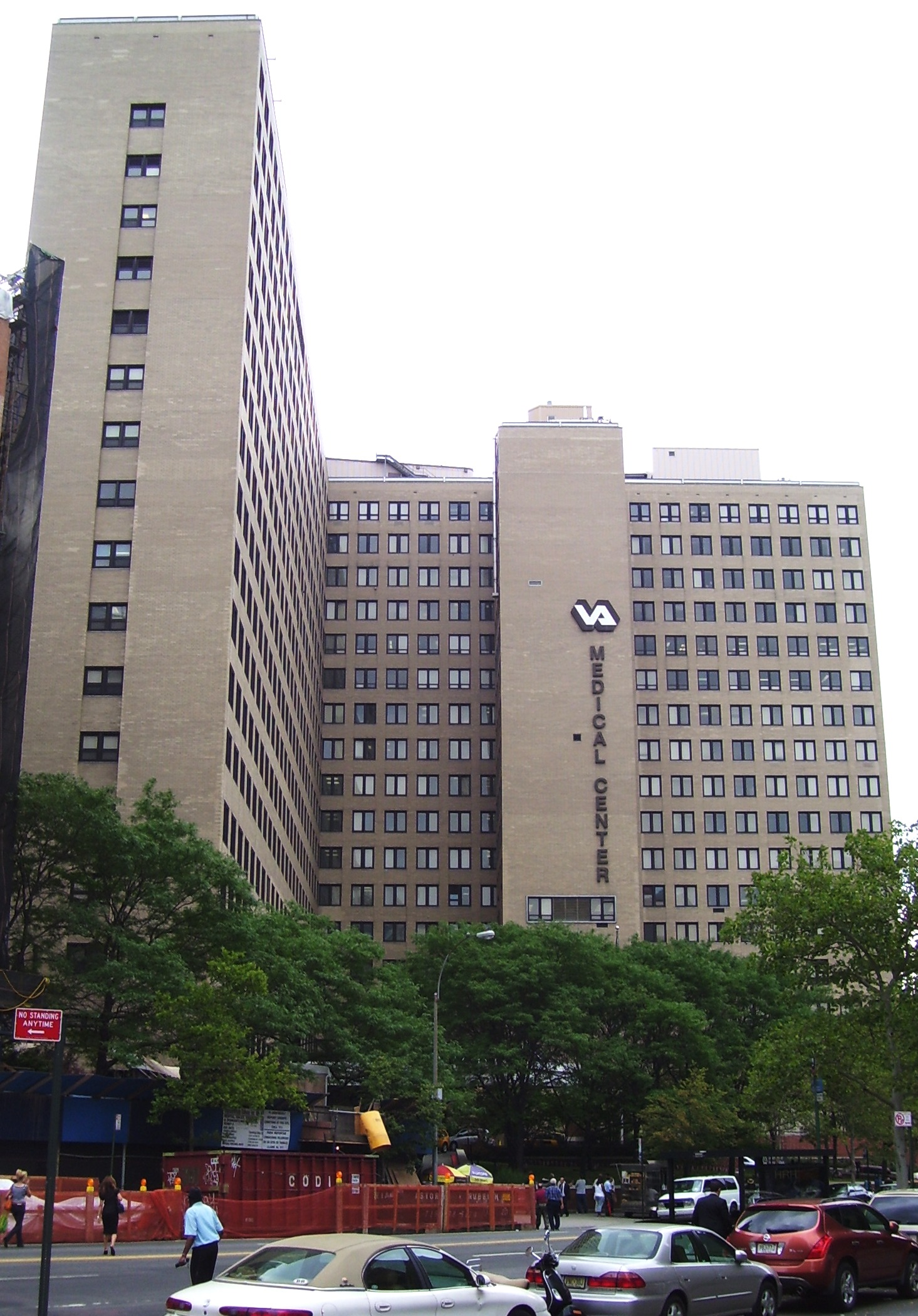
VA Medical Center in Manhattan, New York City

While veterans' benefits have been provided by the federal government since the American Revolutionary War, a veteran-specific federal agency was not established until 1930, as the Veterans' Administration. In 1982, its mission was expanded to include caring for civilians and people who were not veterans in case of a national emergency. In 1989, the Veterans' Administration became a cabinet-level Department of Veterans Affairs. The president appoints the secretary of veterans affairs, who is also a cabinet member, to lead the agency.

As of June 2020, the VA employed 412,892 people at hundreds of Veterans Affairs medical facilities, clinics, benefits offices, and cemeteries. In fiscal year 2016 net program costs for the department were $273 billion, which includes the VBA Actuarial Cost of $106.5 billion for compensation benefits. The long-term "actuarial accrued liability" (total estimated future payments for veterans and their family members) is $2.491 trillion for compensation benefits; $59.6 billion for education benefits; and $4.6 billion for burial benefits.

== History ==
The history and evolution of the U.S. Department of Veterans Affairs are inextricably intertwined and dependent on the history of America's wars, as wounded former soldiers and other U.S. military veterans are the population the VA cares for. The list of wars involving the United States from the American Revolutionary War to the present totals ninety-nine wars. The majority of the United States military casualties of war, however, occurred in the following eight wars: American Revolutionary War (est. 8,000), American Civil War (218,222), World War I (53,402), World War II (291,567), Korean War (33,686), Vietnam War (47,424), Iraq War (3,836), and the War in Afghanistan (1,833). It is these wars that have primarily driven the mission and evolution of the VA. The VA maintains a detailed list of war wounded, as it is this population that comprises the VA care system.

=== Origins ===
The Continental Congress of 1776 encouraged enlistments during the American Revolutionary War by providing pensions for soldiers who were disabled. Three weeks after passing the law compensating the injured, the Continental Congress in September 1776 also approved a resolution awarding grants of public land to all who served in the Continental Army for the duration of the conflict. Direct medical and hospital care given to veterans in the early days of the U.S. was provided by the individual states and communities. In 1811, the first domiciliary and medical facility for veterans was authorized by the federal government but not opened until 1834. In the 19th century, the nation's veterans assistance program was expanded to include benefits and pensions not only for veterans but also their widows and dependents.

Prior to the end of the American Civil War in 1865, Delphine Baker, a volunteer nurse during the war, rallied support to petition the federal government to create a national home for Civil War veterans, based on the U.S. Soldiers Home in Washington, D.C., and the Naval Asylum in Philadelphia for U.S. active-duty veterans. The bill establishing the National Home for Disabled Volunteer Soldiers was passed on March 3, 1865. The very next day, President Abraham Lincoln vouched for the mission of the future facilities in his second inaugural address:

With malice toward none; with charity for all; with firmness in the right, as God gives us to see the right, let us strive on to finish the work we are in; to bind up the nation's wounds; to care for him who shall have borne the battle, and for his widow, and his orphan—to do all which may achieve and cherish a just and a lasting peace, among ourselves, and with all nations.

The middle section of that quote would later form the guiding principle for the future Department of Veterans Affairs.

While domiciliary care for Civil War veterans was managed by the National Home system at 11 various campuses, the pension benefits was split amongst various agencies in the federal government. Throughout the mid-to-late 19th Century, the Bureau of Pensions managed financial benefits to veterans, widows and dependent children. With the completion of the Civil War and an expansion of eligibility in 1890, pension numbers soared, from 303,000 to 966,000 in 1893. Eventually the workforce had to be housed in a new purpose-built home, the Pension Bureau building, which housed the organization from 1885 to 1926.

Furthermore, many state veterans' homes were established. Since domiciliary care was available at all state veterans homes, incidental medical and hospital treatment was provided for all injuries and diseases, whether or not of service origin. Indigent and disabled veterans of the Civil War, Indian Wars, Spanish–American War, and Mexican Border periods, as well as discharged regular members of the Armed Forces, were cared for at these homes.

=== Veterans' Bureau ===
The United States' entrance into World War I in 1917 caused a massive increase in veterans, overwhelming the federal system. When the Republican nominee for president, Warren G. Harding, accepted his party's nomination to the 1920 presidential election, he issued a promise to the more than four million Americans who served in the war:

It is not only a duty, it is a privilege to see that the sacrifices made shall be requited, and that those still suffering from casualties and disabilities shall be abundantly aided and restored to the highest capabilities of citizenship and enjoyment.

At the time of the election, dissatisfaction with the benefits programs for World War I veterans ran rampant throughout the country. To receive benefits, veterans had to navigate through three different federal agencies: the Bureau of War Risk Insurance (BWRI) for insurance and compensation, the U.S. Public Health Service (PHS) for medical and hospital care, and the Federal Board for Vocational Education for rehabilitation, education, and job training. Veterans from previous conflicts continued to rely on the Bureau of Pensions and National Homes for Disabled Volunteer Service for their compensation and medical care respectively.

After winning the election, President Harding appointed a committee in April 1921 to identify a solution. On August 8, 1921, Harding signed Public Law 67-47, popularly known as the Sweet Act, which established the Veterans' Bureau, which absorbed the War Risk Bureau and the Rehabilitation Division of the Federal Board for Vocational Education. In 1922, it gained a large number of veterans' hospital facilities from the Public Health Service, most of which had been recently established on former U.S. Army bases.

One of the landmark measures included in the new law was removing the burden of proof for two disabilities that veterans claimed – tuberculosis and neuropsychiatric disorders. While the legislation only applied to those two categories, it was groundbreaking in establishing presumptive conditions for future claims.

Charles Forbes led the fledgling agency through its initial two years, before resigning in 1923. His replacement, former brigadier general Frank T. Hines took on director of the Veterans' Bureau. By the 1920s, the various benefits were administered by three different federal agencies: the Veterans' Bureau, the Bureau of Pensions, and the National Home for Disabled Volunteer Soldiers.

Typists, Veterans Administration, Central Office Washington D.C. 20 May 1924 , photo LOC

The United States final federal consolidation of veteran government entities came on July 21, 1930, when President Herbert Hoover signed Executive Order 5398, merging all three agencies into the Veterans' Administration. Hines, who had remained in charge of the Veterans' Bureau for seven years, was named the first administrator of Veterans Affairs, a job he held until 1945 when he was replaced by General Omar Bradley.

=== World War II ===
In 1940, with war already raging in Europe and Asia, VA began preparing for potential American involvement in the conflict. Hines informed Congress that the agency was coordinating with the War Department to assist in the event of a national emergency with both hospital bed space and highly trained medical staff.

Following the Japanese attack on Pearl Harbor and America's entry into World War II, the U.S. Army's need for physicians and other healthcare professionals was acute. As the surgeon general of the Army, Maj. Gen. Norman T. Kirk, bluntly reported, "It was difficult during the past year to secure the additional Medical Corps officers needed to meet the requirements of the increasing Army since there are not sufficient physicians available to meet both military and civilian medical needs."

The military's demand for healthcare professionals drained staff from the civilian medical community and VA alike. Between 1942 and mid-1944, 16 percent of VA employees were furloughed for military service. A December 1943 agreement between Secretary of War Henry L. Stimson and the VA's administrator paved the way for a collaborative use of limited medical personnel. Their solution included inducting select VA doctors and dentists into the Army but allowing them to remain at VA facilities. While detailed to VA, Army personnel wore a distinctive shoulder sleeve insignia designed by the Heraldic Section of the Army's Office of the Quartermaster General. One of the most notable to wear this patch was Gen. Omar N. Bradley.

The close of World War II resulted in not only a vast increase in the veteran population but also a large number of new benefits enacted by Congress for veterans of the war. In addition, during the late 1940s, the VA had to contend with aging World War I veterans. During that time, "the clientele of the VA increased almost fivefold with an addition of nearly 16,000,000 World War II veterans and approximately 4,000,000 World War I veterans." Prior to World War II, in response to scandals at the Veterans Bureau, programs that cared for veterans were centralized in Washington, D.C. This centralization caused delays and bottlenecks as the agency tried to serve World War II veterans. As a result, the VA went through a decentralization process, giving more authority to the field offices.

The Servicemen's Readjustment Act, commonly known as the GI Bill, was signed into law on June 22, 1944, by President Franklin D. Roosevelt. "The United States government began serious consolidated services to veterans in 1930. The GI Bill of Rights, which was passed in 1944, had more effect on the American way of life than any other legislation—with the possible exception of the Homestead Act."

Unlike previous legislation, the GI Bill stipulated that all benefits were to be managed by the VA. Further educational assistance acts were passed for the benefit of veterans of the Korean War.

=== Promotion to Department of Veterans Affairs ===
The Department of Veterans Affairs Act of 1988 (Pub. L. 100–527) changed the former Veterans' Administration, an independent government agency established in 1930 into a Cabinet-level Department of Veterans Affairs. It was signed into law by President Ronald Reagan on October 25, 1988, but came into effect under the term of his successor, George H. W. Bush, on March 15, 1989.

The reform period of 1995 to 2000 saw the Veterans Health Administration (VHA) dramatically improve care access, quality, and efficiency. This was achieved by leveraging its national integrated electronic health information system (VistA) and in so doing, implementing universal primary care, which increased patients treated by 24%, had a 48% increase in ambulatory care visits, and decreased staffing by 12%. By 2000, the VHA had 10,000 fewer employees than in 1995 and a 104% increase in patients treated since 1995, and had managed to maintain the same cost per patient-day, while all other facilities' costs had risen by over 30% to 40% during the same period.

Authored by Senator Jim Webb, the Post-9/11 Veterans Educational Assistance Act of 2008 doubled the GI Bill's college benefits and provided a 13-week extension to federal unemployment benefits. The new GI Bill more than doubled the value of the benefit from $40,000 to about $90,000. In-state public universities are essentially covered to provide full scholarships for veterans under the new education package. For those veterans who served at least three years, a monthly housing stipend was also added to the law. Congress and President Barack Obama extended the new GI Bill in August 2009 at a cost of roughly $70 billion over the next decade. The Department of Defense (DoD) allows individuals who, on or after August 1, 2009, have served at least six years in the Armed Forces and who agree to serve at least another four years in the U.S. Armed Forces to transfer unused entitlement to their surviving spouse. Service members reaching 10-year anniversaries could choose to transfer the benefit to any dependents, such as their spouse or children.

In May 2014, critics of the VA system reported problems with scheduling timely access to medical care. In May 2014, a retired doctor said that veterans died because of delays in getting care at the Phoenix, Arizona, Veterans Health Administration facilities. An investigation of delays in treatment in the Veterans Health Administration system conducted by the Veterans Affairs Inspector General of 3,409 veteran patients found that there were 28 instances of clinically significant delays in care associated with access or scheduling. Of these 28 patients, six were deceased. The same OIG report stated that the Office of Investigations had opened investigations at 93 sites of care in response to allegations of wait time manipulations, and found that wait time manipulations were prevalent throughout the VHA. On May 30, 2014, Secretary of Veterans Affairs Eric Shinseki resigned from office due to the fallout from the scandal, saying he could not explain the lack of integrity among some leaders in VA healthcare facilities. "That breach of integrity is irresponsible, it is indefensible, and unacceptable to me. I said when this situation began weeks to months ago that I thought the problem was limited and isolated because I believed that. I no longer believe it. It is systemic. I was too trusting of some and I accepted as accurate reports that I now know to have been misleading with regard to patient wait-times," Shinseki said in a statement.

In September 2017, the VA declared its intent to abolish a 1960s conflict of interest rule prohibiting employees from owning stock in, performing service for, or doing any work at for-profit colleges; arguing that, for example, the rule prohibits VA doctors from teaching veterans at for-profit universities with special advantages for veterans. In 2018, the VA instead established a process for employees to seek waivers of the policy based on individual circumstances.

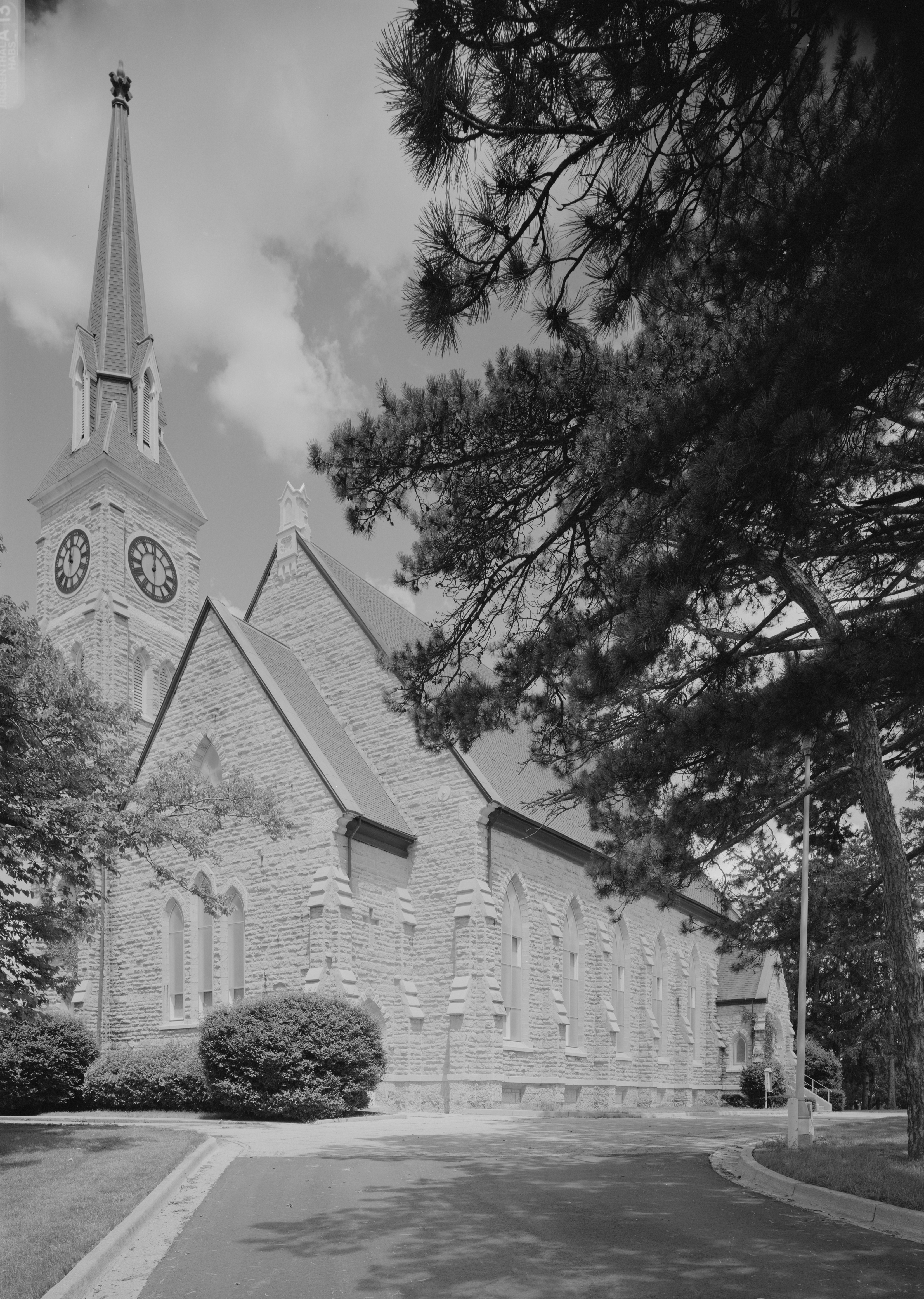
National Home for Disabled Volunteer Soldiers, Dayton, Ohio

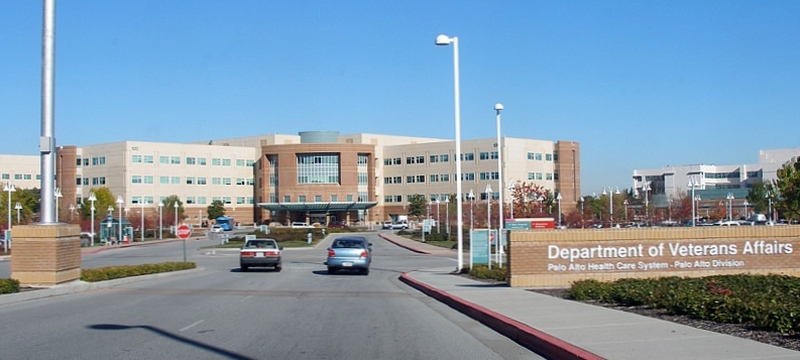
VA Medical Center in Palo Alto, California

In 2023, the VA adopted a new mission statement: "To fulfill President Lincoln's promise to care for those who have served in our nation's military and for their families, caregivers, and survivors." The VA's previous mission statement, established in 1959, was "To fulfill President Lincoln's promise ‘to care for him who shall have borne the battle, and for his widow, and his orphan’ by serving and honoring the men and women who are America's veterans."

The VA increased its staff by more than 60,000 in 2023 and 2024 to address more than a million burn pit–related claims following passage of the Honoring our PACT Act of 2022. More than 80,000 VA employees, including many of those hired under PACT Act funding, were targeted in 2025 to be fired by President Donald Trump and the Department of Government Efficiency, which would delay benefits for affected veterans.

== Functions ==
The VA's primary function is to support veterans in their time after service by providing benefits and support.

Providing care for non-veteran civilian or military patients in case hospitals overflowed in a crisis was added as a role by Congress in 1982, and became known as the VA's "fourth mission" (besides the three missions of serving veterans through care, research, and training). It can provide medical services (reimbursed from other federal agencies) to the general public for major disasters and emergencies declared by the president of the United States, and when the secretary of health and human services activates the National Disaster Medical System. During disasters and health emergencies, requests for VA assistance are made by state governors to the Federal Emergency Management Agency or the Department of Health and Human Services, which then relay approved requests to the VA. The VA is also allowed to provide paid medical care on an emergency basis to non-veterans. On March 27, 2020, the VA made public its COVID-19 response plan within its medical facilities to protect veterans, their families, and staff.

One initiative in the department is to prevent and end veterans' homelessness. The VA works with the United States Interagency Council on Homelessness to address these issues. The USICH identified ending veterans' homelessness by 2015 as a primary goal in its proposal Opening Doors: Federal Strategic Plan to Prevent and End Homelessness, released in 2010; amendments to the 2010 version made in 2015 include a preface written by U.S. Secretary of Labor Thomas E. Perez that cites a 33% reduction in veteran homelessness since the creation of the Opening Doors initiative. The prominent role of the Department of Veterans Affairs and its joined up approach to veteran welfare are such that they have been deemed to distinguish the U.S. response to veteran homelessness internationally.

The General Services Administration (GSA) has delegated authority to the VA to procure medical supplies under the VA Federal Supply Schedules Program for both the VA itself and other government agencies.

== Organization ==
The Department of Veterans Affairs is headed by the secretary of veterans affairs, appointed by the president with the advice and consent of the Senate.

The twelfth and current secretary of veterans affairs is Doug Collins, who was selected by President Donald Trump and sworn into office by associate justice Clarence Thomas on February 5, 2025. The deputy secretary of veterans affairs position is currently vacant with the retirement of Thomas G. Bowman on June 15, 2018. The third listed executive on the VA's official web site is its chief of staff (currently Pamela J. Powers); the chief of staff position does not require Senate confirmation. In addition to secretary and deputy secretary, the VA has ten more positions requiring presidential appointment and Senate approval.

The department has three main subdivisions, known as administrations, each headed by an undersecretary:

- Veterans Health Administration (VHA): responsible for providing health care in all its forms, as well as for biomedical research (under the Office of Research and Development), Community Based Outpatient Clinics (CBOCs), Regional Medical Centers (VAMC), and Readjustment Counseling Services (RCS) Vet Centers.
- Veterans Benefits Administration (VBA): responsible for initial veteran registration, eligibility determination, and five key lines of business (benefits and entitlements): Home Loan Guarantee, Insurance, Vocational Rehabilitation and Employment, Education (GI Bill), and Compensation & Pension
- National Cemetery Administration: responsible for providing burial and memorial benefits, as well as for maintenance of VA cemeteries

There are assistant secretaries of veteran affairs for: Congressional and Legislative Affairs; Policy and Planning; Human Resources and Administration; and Operations, Security and Preparedness. Other Senate-approved presidential nominees at the VA include the Chief Financial Officer; Chairman of the Board of Veterans' Appeals; General Counsel; and Inspector General.

As of 2017, the VA employs 377,805 people, of whom 338,205 are nonseasonal full-time employees. The American Federation of Government Employees represents 230,000 VA employees, with VA matters addressed in detail by the National VA Council.

About one fourth of VA employees are veterans.

=== Veterans Benefits Administration ===
The VA, through its Veterans Benefits Administration (VBA), provides a variety of services for veterans, including disability compensation, pension, education, home loans, life insurance, vocational, rehabilitation, survivors' benefits, health care, and burial benefits.

The Department of Labor (DOL) provides job development and job training opportunities for disabled and other veterans through contacts with employers and local agencies.

The PACT Act, signed into law in 2022, significantly expanded VA health care and benefits for veterans exposed to burn pits, Agent Orange, and other toxic substances. The VA has referred to the law as "perhaps the largest health care and benefit expansion in VA history.".

=== National Cemetery Administration ===
In 1973, the Department of Veterans Affairs assumed responsibility for the National Cemetery System (NCS), with the exception of Arlington National Cemetery, which was transferred from the Department of the Army. This was made official by Public Law 93-43, also known as the National Cemeteries Act of 1973.

Five years later, Congress established the State Cemetery Grants Program under Public Law 95-476. The National Cemetery Administration now administers this program, which provides assistance to states and U.S. territories in establishing, expanding, and improving veterans cemeteries.

The National Cemetery Administration (NCA) is a division of the Department of Veterans Affairs (VA) responsible for providing burial and memorial benefits to eligible veterans and their families. Its primary mission is to honor veterans and their service to the nation by ensuring they receive dignified and respectful interments in national cemeteries.

Key responsibilities of the NCA include:

1. Operation and Maintenance: The NCA manages and maintains national cemeteries across the United States, ensuring they are well-kept and respectful places of remembrance.
2. Burial Services: The administration provides burial options, including in-ground casket burials, columbarium niches for cremated remains, and in some cases, private family plots.
3. Headstones and Markers: The NCA furnishes headstones, markers, and medallions for the graves of eligible veterans, regardless of whether they are buried in a national cemetery, a state veterans cemetery, or a private cemetery.
4. Memorial Programs: The NCA administers programs such as the Presidential Memorial Certificate program, which provides certificates bearing the President's signature to honor the memory of deceased veterans.
5. Expansion and Development: The NCA is involved in the planning and development of new national cemeteries to ensure that burial options remain available to veterans and their families in various regions of the country. The NCA's overarching goal is to provide a final resting place that honors the service and sacrifice of veterans, ensuring their legacy is preserved for future generations.

=== Center for Women Veterans ===
The Center for Women Veterans (CWA) was established within the Department of Veterans Affairs by Public Law 103-446 in November 1994. The center's mission is to:

- Monitor and coordinate the VA's delivery of health care, benefits, and programs for women veterans
- Advocate for cultural transformation (within VA and in the general public) in recognizing the service and contributions of women veterans and women in the military
- Raise awareness of the responsibility to treat women veterans with dignity and respect.

Center for Women Veterans activities include monitoring and coordinating delivery of benefits and services to women veterans; coordinating with Federal, state, and local agencies and organizations and non-government partners which serve women veterans; serving as a resource and referral center for women veterans, their families, and their advocates; educating VA staff on women' military contributions; ensuring that outreach materials portray and target women veterans; promoting recognition of women veterans' service with activities and special events; and coordinating meetings of the Advisory Committee on Women Veterans. CWA has held summits and forums for female veterans and created social media campaigns and exhibits to highlight women's military service. CWA offers a Women Veterans Call Center (1-855-829-6636) to assist female U.S. military veterans with VA services and resources. In 2018, the Center for Women Veterans launched the "I Am Not Invisible" photography project, featuring individual portraits, to highlight and represent the contributions, needs, and experiences of America's two million women veterans.

== Costs for care ==
The VA categorizes veterans into eight priority groups and several additional subgroups, based on factors such as service-connected disabilities, and their income and assets (adjusted to local cost of living).

Veterans with a 50% or higher service-connected disability as determined by a VA regional office "rating board" (e.g., losing a limb in battle, PTSD, etc.) are provided comprehensive care and medication at no charge. Veterans with lesser qualifying factors who exceed a pre-defined income threshold have to make co-payments for care for non-service-connected ailments and prescription medication. VA dental and nursing home care benefits are more restricted.

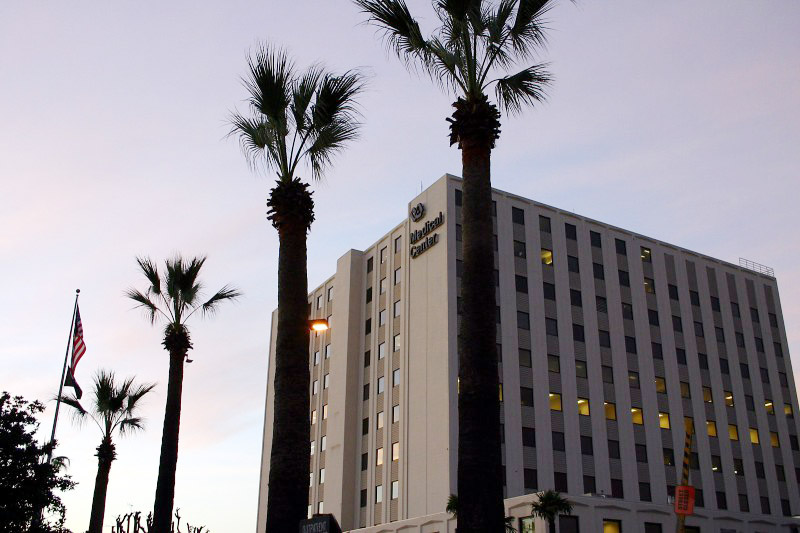
VA Medical Center in Long Beach, California

Reservists and National Guard personnel who served stateside in peacetime settings or have no service-related disabilities generally do not qualify for VA health benefits.

The VA's budget has been pushed to the limit in recent years by the war on terrorism. In December 2004, it was widely reported that VA's funding crisis had become so severe that it could no longer provide disability ratings to veterans in a timely fashion. This is a problem because until veterans are fully transitioned from the active-duty TRICARE healthcare system to VA, they are on their own with regard to many healthcare costs.

The VA's backlog of pending disability claims under review (a process known as "adjudication") peaked at 421,000 in 2001, and bottomed out at 254,000 in 2003, but crept back up to 340,000 in 2005. As of 2025, the backlog of pending disability claims was 178,003.

These numbers are released every Monday.

No copayment is required for VA services for veterans with military-related medical conditions. VA-recognized service-connected disabilities include problems that started or were aggravated due to military service. Veteran service organizations such as the American Legion, Veterans of Foreign Wars, and Disabled American Veterans, as well as state-operated Veterans Affairs offices and County Veteran Service Officers (CVSO), have been known to assist veterans in the process of getting care from the VA.

In his budget proposal for fiscal year 2009, President George W. Bush requested $38.7 billion—or 86.5% of the total Veterans Affairs budget—for veteran medical care alone.

In the 2011 Costs of War report from Brown University, researchers projected that the cost of caring for veterans of the war on terror would peak 30–40 years after the end of combat operations. They also predicted that medical and disability costs would ultimately total between $600 billion and $1 trillion for the hundreds of thousands treated by the Department of Veterans Affairs.

== Freedom of Information Act processing performance ==
In a 2015 Center for Effective Government analysis of 15 federal agencies which receive the most Freedom of Information Act (United States) (FOIA) requests (using 2012 and 2013 data, the most recent years available), the VA earned a D by scoring 64 out of a possible 100 points, i.e. did not earn a satisfactory overall grade, for facilitating FOIA requests.

== Related legislation ==
- 1944: Mustering-out Payment Act PL 78–225
- 1944: Servicemen's Readjustment Act PL 78–346
- 1944: Veterans' Preference Act PL 78–359
- 1952: Veterans' Readjustment Assistance Act PL 82–550
- 1974: Vietnam Veterans' Readjustment Assistance Act
- 1988: Department of Veterans Affairs Act PL 100–527
- 2006: Veterans Benefits, Health Care, and Information Technology Act of 2006 PL 109-461: requires (in part) that the VA prioritizes veteran-owned and Service-Disabled Veteran-Owned Small Businesses (VOSB and SDVOSB) when awarding contracts to small businesses.
- 2013: FOR VETS Act of 2013 Pub. L. 113–26 (text) (PDF)
- 2013: Veterans Paralympic Act of 2013 (H.R. 1402; 113th Congress) Pub. L. 113–59 (text) (PDF)
- 2014: Veterans Access, Choice, and Accountability Act of 2014 (H.R. 3230; 113th Congress) Pub. L. 113–146 (text) (PDF)
- 2017: Veterans Appeals Improvement and Modernization Act of 2017
- 2022: Honoring our Promise to Address Comprehensive Toxics (PACT) Act of 2022

== See also ==
- Department of Veterans Affairs Under Secretary's Award in Health Services Research
- eBenefits
- Independent Living Program
- Supportive Services for Veteran Families (SSVF)
- United States Department of Veterans Affairs Police
- Veterans Health Information Systems and Technology Architecture (VistA)
