= List of University of Pittsburgh faculty =

This list of University of Pittsburgh faculty includes instructors, researchers, and administrators of the University of Pittsburgh, a state-related research university located in Pittsburgh, Pennsylvania, United States.

== Arts and entertainment ==
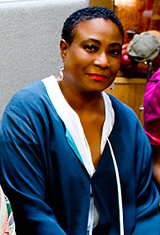
Geri Allen was director of the Jazz Studies Program at Pitt until her death in 2017.

- Geri Allen (A&S 1983G, faculty 2013–2017) – jazz composer, educator, and pianist
- F. Curtis Canfield (faculty 1967–73) – theater director and drama professor
- Caitlin Clarke – theater and film actress; theatre teacher
- David Dalessandro (administrator) – screenwriter of 2006 thriller Snakes on a Plane
- Nathan Davis (faculty 1969–2013) – jazz musician
- Terrance Hayes (MFA 1997, faculty 2013–present) – poet whose books have won such awards as the National Book Award for Poetry and the National Poetry Series
- Chuck Kinder (faculty 1980–2014) – novelist
- Carl Kurlander (faculty) – Hollywood screenwriter, television writer/producer, and author
- Jeanne Marie Laskas (MFA 1986, faculty 2001–present) – journalist/writer, author of Concussion, GQ correspondent
- Nicole Mitchell (faculty 2019–2022) – jazz flautist and composer
- Joe Negri (faculty) – jazz guitarist and educator
- Ed Ochester – professor, poet, and editor
- Rob Penny – professor, poet, and playwright
- Christopher Rawson (faculty) – writer and theater critic
- Ed Roberson (A&S 1970, faculty) – poet
- Rebecca Skloot (MFA, faculty) – freelance science writer; best selling author; specializes in science and medicine
- Terry Smith – art historian, art critic, and artist
- Jack Stauber – YouTuber, musician, singer-songwriter, designer, and animator
- Chad Taylor (faculty 2024–present) – jazz drummer
- Franklin Toker (faculty) – architectural historian and author

== Business and economics ==
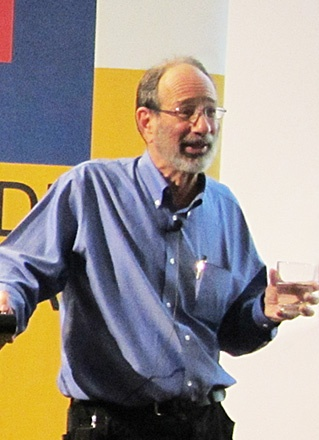
Al Roth conducted much of his Nobel Prize-winning work in economics while at Pitt.

- Alvin E. Roth (faculty 1982–1998) – Nobel Prize-winning economist; Andrew W. Mellon Professor of Economics
- Jagdish Sheth (Katz 1962, 1966; faculty 1973–1974) – business consultant; Albert Frey Professor of Marketing

== History ==
- Barbara Stern Burstin (faculty) – Holocaust scholar and author
- Paul Russell Cutright (PhD, faculty) – American historian and biologist
- Robert Donnorummo – senior research associate and associate director of the Center for Russian and East European Studies
- Seymour Drescher (faculty) – historian known for his work on Alexis de Tocqueville and slavery
- Hugh Kearney (faculty) – British historian
- Irina Livezeanu (faculty) – historian of Eastern Europe and the Holocaust
- Patrick Manning (faculty) – specialist in world and African history, including migration and the African diaspora
- David Montgomery (former faculty) – historian specializing in U.S. labor history
- Diego Olstein (PhD, faculty) – chair of the history department (as of March 2023), known for his work on Medieval Europe and world history
- Marcus Rediker (faculty) – George Washington Book Prize and Merle Curti Award-winning historian

== History and philosophy of science ==
- Michael R. Dietrich (PhD 1991, faculty) – professor, History and Philosophy of Biology
- John Earman (Emeritus Distinguished Professor) – philosopher of Physics, collaborator on the hole argument
- James G. Lennox (emeritus professor) – History and Philosophy of Biology
- Edouard Machery (PhD 2004, faculty) – Distinguished Professor, History and Philosophy of Psychology
- Stephen Manuck – Distinguished Professor of Psychology
- Sandra Mitchell (PhD 1987, faculty) – Distinguished Professor, History and Philosophy of Biology
- John D. Norton (PhD 1981, faculty) – Distinguished Professor, History and Philosophy of Physics
- Robert Olby (emeritus professor) – History of Biology

== Philosophy ==
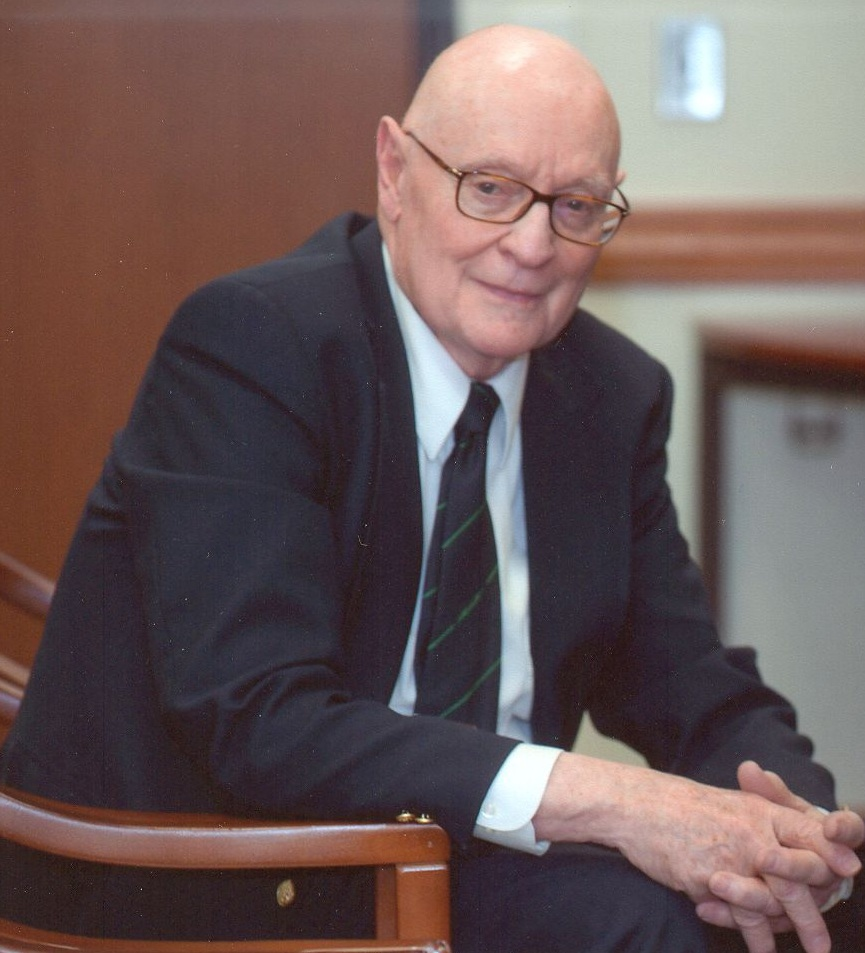
Philosophy professor Nicholas Rescher

- Nuel Belnap – logician and philosopher known for his work on the philosophy of logic, temporal logic and structural proof theory
- Robert Brandom (faculty) – philosopher ("the Iron City Kant") and author of Making it Explicit
- James F. Conant – philosopher who has written about the philosophy of language, ethics, and metaphilosophy; known for writings on Wittgenstein and his association with the New Wittgenstein interpretation
- David Gauthier – Canadian-American neo-Hobbesian philosopher; author of Morals By Agreement; philosophy department chairman
- Adolf Grünbaum – professor and philosopher of science elected into the American Academy of Arts and Sciences
- John Haugeland – professor and philosopher whose work has focused on the philosophy of mind, cognitive science, phenomenology, and Heidegger; coined the term "Good Old Fashioned Artificial Intelligence"
- Carl G. Hempel – University Professor of Philosophy and notable proponent of logical positivism
- John McDowell – philosopher, author of Mind and World
- Nicholas Rescher – professor and philosopher; advocate of pragmatism and process philosophy; namesake of the Rescher Prize in Philosophy
- Wilfrid Sellars – philosopher and critic of foundationalist epistemology whose work is the foundation and archetype of what is sometimes called the "Pittsburgh School"
- Rudolph H. Weingartner – philosopher and former provost of the university (1987–1989), Guggenheim Fellow

== Politics, law, and activism ==
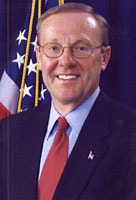
D. Michael Fisher, Distinguished Jurist in Residence at the Pitt Law

- Ruggero J. Aldisert – judge on the United States Court of Appeals for the Third Circuit; adjunct professor at University of Pittsburgh School of Law
- D. Michael Fisher (Law) – senior U.S. federal judge of the United States Court of Appeals for the Third Circuit
- David Garrow (Law, 2011–present) – law professor and historian who won the 1987 Pulitzer Prize for Biography; writes about the history of the United States Supreme Court and the history of the Civil Rights Movement
- Eugene Allen Gilmore (Law 1940–1942) – vice governor-general of the Philippine Islands 1922–1929; twice served as acting governor-general of the Philippines
- Paul Y. Hammond (Graduate School of Public and International Affairs) – Distinguished Service Professor, specialist in American foreign policy and national security studies
- Carla Hayden – 14th Librarian of Congress; first woman and first African-American to hold the post
- David J. Hickton (Law 1981) – staff director and senior counsel to the House Select Subcommittee on the Coronavirus Crisis, former U.S. attorney for the Western District of Pennsylvania, director and founder of the University of Pittsburgh Institute for Cyber Law, Policy and Security
- Christopher Hitchens – deceased author, journalist, and polemicist; taught several semesters at Pitt as a visiting professor
- Walter H. Lowrie (Col 1826, faculty 1846–1851) – chief justice of the Pennsylvania Supreme Court
- J. Warren Madden (Law faculty) – served on the US Court of Claims; first chair of the National Labor Relations Board; received the Medal of Freedom in 1947
- Raymond Tshibanda (faculty) – president of the Liberal Christian Democrats Union of the Democratic Republic of the Congo

== Science, medicine, and technology ==
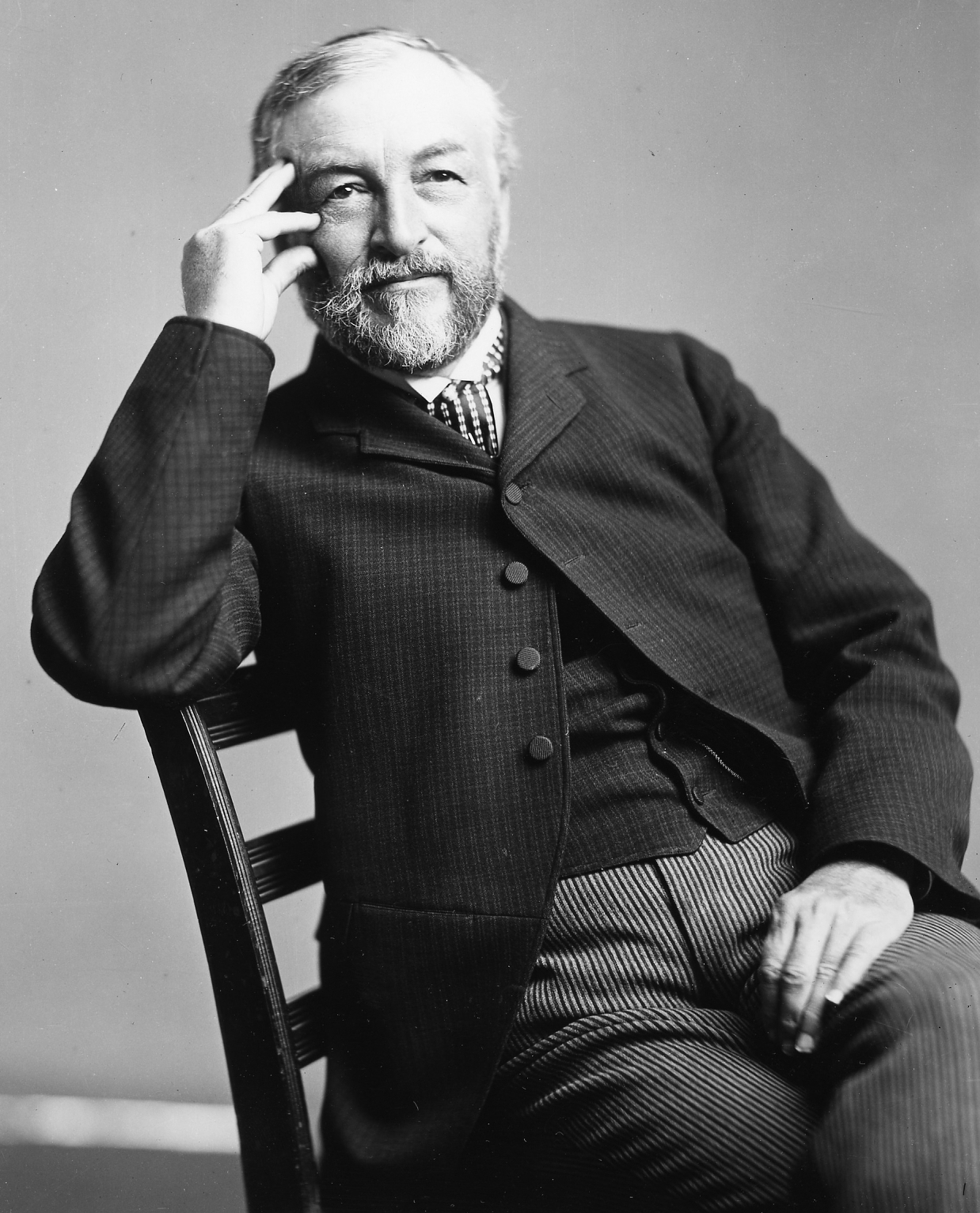
Professor Samuel Pierpont Langley was a leading astronomer, physicist, inventor, aviation pioneer, and also served as the head of the Smithsonian Institution.

- George Frederick Barker (faculty 1864–?) – scientist who studied early incandescent lighting; president of the American Association for the Advancement of Science and American Chemical Society
- Jeremy M. Berg (faculty) – Eli Lilly Award in Biological Chemistry-winning biochemist known for his work on zinc finger proteins
- Francois Boller – neurologist
- John Alfred Brashear – astronomer; succeeded James Keeler as Director of the Allegheny Observatory; later Pitt's Chancellor; maker of astronomical and scientific instruments; developer of silvering methods that would become the standard for telescope mirrors
- David M. Brienza (faculty) – bioengineer specializing in wheelchair design and ulcer prevention
- William A. Cassidy – geologist noted for his work on Antarctic meteorites, founder and former leader of ANSMET
- Yuan Chang – virologist; pathologist; co-discoverer of the cause of Kaposi's sarcoma, a deadly cancer commonly found in AIDS patients
- David I. Cleland (A&S 1954, KGSB 1958, faculty) – engineer and educator; "father of project management"
- Ellen Cohn – associate dean at the University of Pittsburgh School of Health and Rehabilitation Sciences
- Rory A. Cooper (faculty 1994–present) – bioengineer and inventor, holds numerous patents on wheelchair technology
- Sheila Corrall (faculty) – professor of Library and Information Science and first president of the Chartered Institute of Library and Information Professionals
- John Charles Cutler (faculty) – former deputy director of the Pan American Sanitary Bureau; led a U.S. Public Health Service research team in a controversial experiment which infected about 1500 citizens of Guatemala with syphilis and gonorrhea in the late 1940s
- Thomas Detre (faculty) – psychiatrist; transformative leader within the University of Pittsburgh Medical Center, 1973–2010
- Erik Erikson (faculty 1951–1960) – developmental psychologist and psychoanalyst known for his theory on psychosocial development and for coining the phrase "identity crisis"
- Kai T. Erikson (faculty 1959–1963) – sociologist; authority on the social consequences of catastrophic events; 76th president of the American Sociological Association
- Reginald Aubrey Fessenden – inventor, chemist, and sonar pioneer; developed insulation for electrical wires; built first wireless telephone; transmitted the first audio radio broadcast; head of electrical engineering at Western University of Pennsylvania
- Bernard Fisher (MD, faculty) – pioneer breast cancer researcher
- Ida M. Flynn (1942–2004) – computer scientist, textbook author, and professor
- Diana E. Forsythe – anthropologist noted for her work on artificial intelligence and medical informatics
- Freddie Fu (faculty) – sports medicine expert
- David Geller (faculty) – hepatobiliary surgical oncologist who helped to pioneer laparoscopic liver resections
- George Otto Gey (A&S 1921, faculty) – scientist who first propagated the HeLa cell line
- Thomas Hales – mathematics professor; provided proof of the Kepler Conjecture

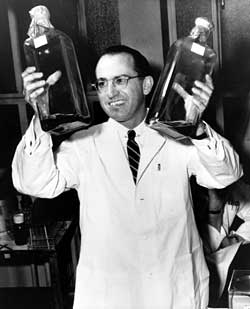
Jonas Salk and his team of Pitt scientists developed the world's first polio vaccine at the university's Virus Research Lab, located in what is now Salk Hall.

- David Halliday (A&S 1938, MS 1939, PhD 1941, faculty 1946–2010) – physicist widely known for his physics textbooks, Physics and Fundamentals of Physics
- D.A. Henderson (faculty) – 1986 National Medal of Science; directed World Health Organization's Global Smallpox Eradication Campaign
- Irene Jakab – native of Hungary; psychiatrist and humanist; member of the faculties of Harvard University, the University of Pittsburgh and the McLean Hospital
- Niels Kaj Jerne (faculty 1962–1966) – Nobel Prize-winning immunologist credited for describing the production of monoclonal antibodies
- Rosella Kanarik (1909–2014) – mathematics professor
- Panayotis Katsoyannis – biochemist; discoverer of synthetic insulin
- James E. Keeler – astronomer; director of Allegheny Observatory, 1891–1898; discovered that Saturn's rings were not solid but made of particles; interred in the observatory crypt
- Allen Kent (faculty 1963–1992) – pioneer of information science, founded Pitt's Department of Information Science
- Charles Glen King (MS, PhD, faculty) – biochemist; isolated vitamin C
- Samuel Pierpont Langley – astronomer, physicist, inventor, aviation pioneer, professor of astronomy at the Western University of Pennsylvania; his 1890 publication of infrared observations at the Allegheny Observatory was used to make the first calculations on the greenhouse effect
- Margaret McFarland – child psychologist who researched the meaning of the interactions between mothers and children
- Maud Menten – pathologist at Pitt, 1923–1950; helped devise the Michaelis–Menten equation in the field of enzyme kinetics
- Patrick S. Moore – virologist and epidemiologist; co-discoverer of the cause of Kaposi's sarcoma, a deadly cancer commonly found in AIDS patients
- Eugene Nicholas Myers – leader in the treatment of head and neck cancer
- Herbert Needleman – pediatrician and child psychiatrist known for research studies on the neurodevelopmental damage caused by lead poisoning
- Ezra T. Newman (faculty) – physicist known for Newman-Penrose formalism, Kerr-Newman solution, Heaven, and null foliation theory
- Jack Paradise (faculty) – pediatrician; a leading researcher of the placement of tympanostomy tubes in children with persistent otitis media
- Thomas Parran, Jr. – physician; first dean of the University of Pittsburgh School of Public Health after serving as U.S. Surgeon General, 1936–1948
- Mark M. Ravitch (faculty 1969–1989) – professor of surgery
- Robert Resnick (1940–1956) – physicist widely known for his physics textbook Fundamentals of Physics written with David Halliday
- Renã A. S. Robinson – researcher into ion-mobility spectrometry and time-of-flight mass spectrometry, proteomics, Alzheimer's disease
- Carlo Rovelli (1990–2000, affiliated 2000–present) – theoretical physicist in the field of quantum gravity; among the founders of the loop quantum gravity theory; has worked in the history and philosophy of science; affiliated professor in the university's Department of History and Philosophy of Science

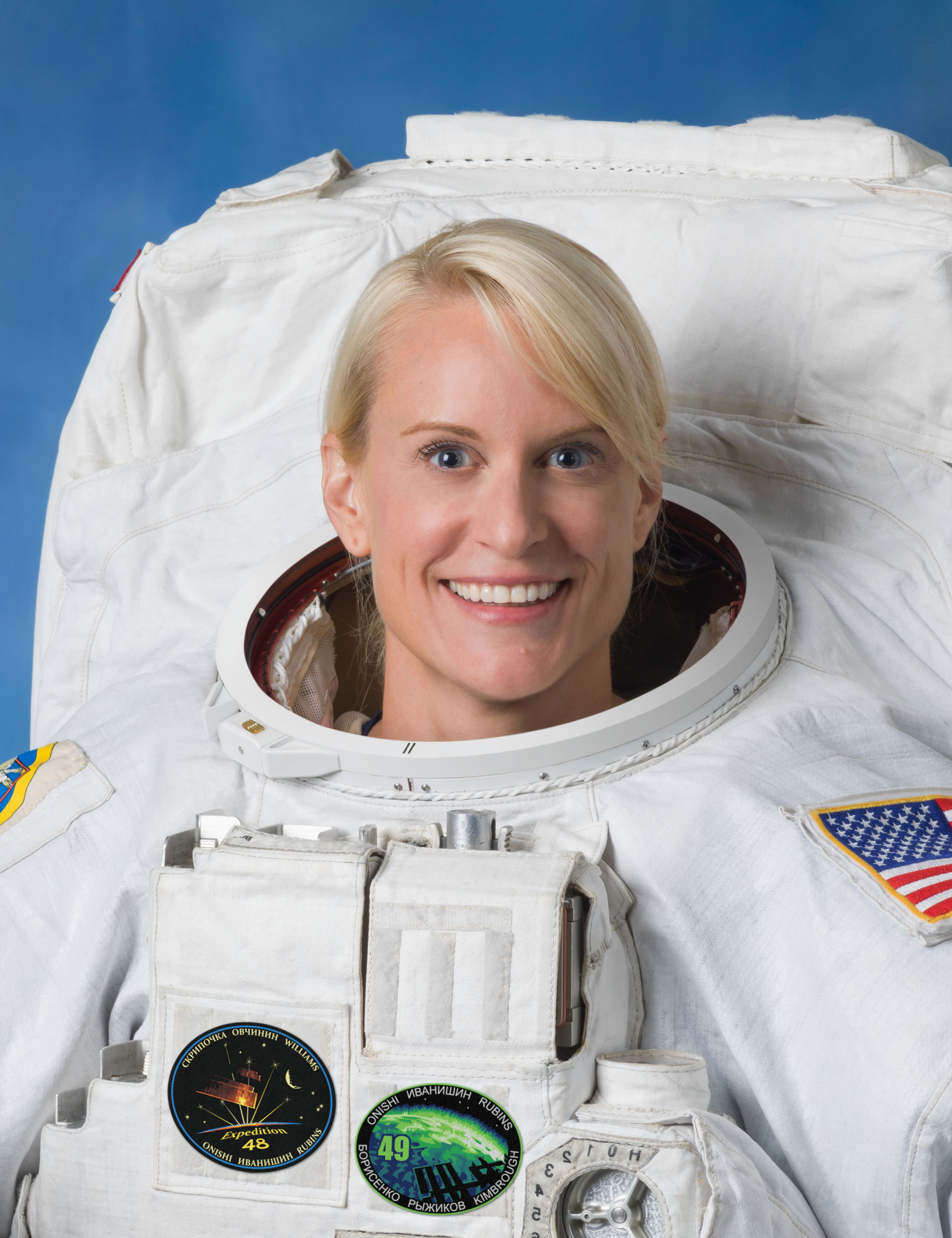
Former astronaut Kate Rubins is a microbiologist and Pitt's inaugural director of the Trivedi Institute for Space and Global Biomedicine.

- Kathleen Rubins (2026-present) – microbiologist and former astronaut
- Peter Safar – physician, CPR pioneer; three-time nominee for the Nobel Prize; established Pitt's Anesthesiology Department
- José-Alain Sahel – ophthalmologist and leading vision researcher who founded the Vision Institute in Paris
- Jonas Salk – physician, head of Pitt Virus Research Lab, developer of the polio vaccine
- Jeffrey H. Schwartz – anthropologist; elected president of the World Academy of Art and Science
- David Servan-Schreiber – physician, neuroscientist, and New York Times best-selling author
- Mary Margaret Speer (PhD math 1935) – mathematician
- Benjamin Spock – writer of child development books
- Thomas Starzl – transplant pioneer, 2004 National Medal of Science recipient
- Ernest J. Sternglass – physicist and author, known for his research on the health risks of low-level radiation and digital medical imaging technologies
- Amy Wagner – professor in Department of Physical Medicine and Rehabilitation
- David H. Waldeck – chemistry professor
- William E. Wallace (PhD Chem 1941 & faculty) – physical chemist and Guggenheim Fellow who worked on the Manhattan Project
- Cyril Wecht (A&S 1952, Med 1956, LLB 1962, faculty) – controversial forensic pathologist
- J. Scott Yaruss (faculty) – American Speech-Language-Hearing Association fellow; stuttering researcher

== Other ==
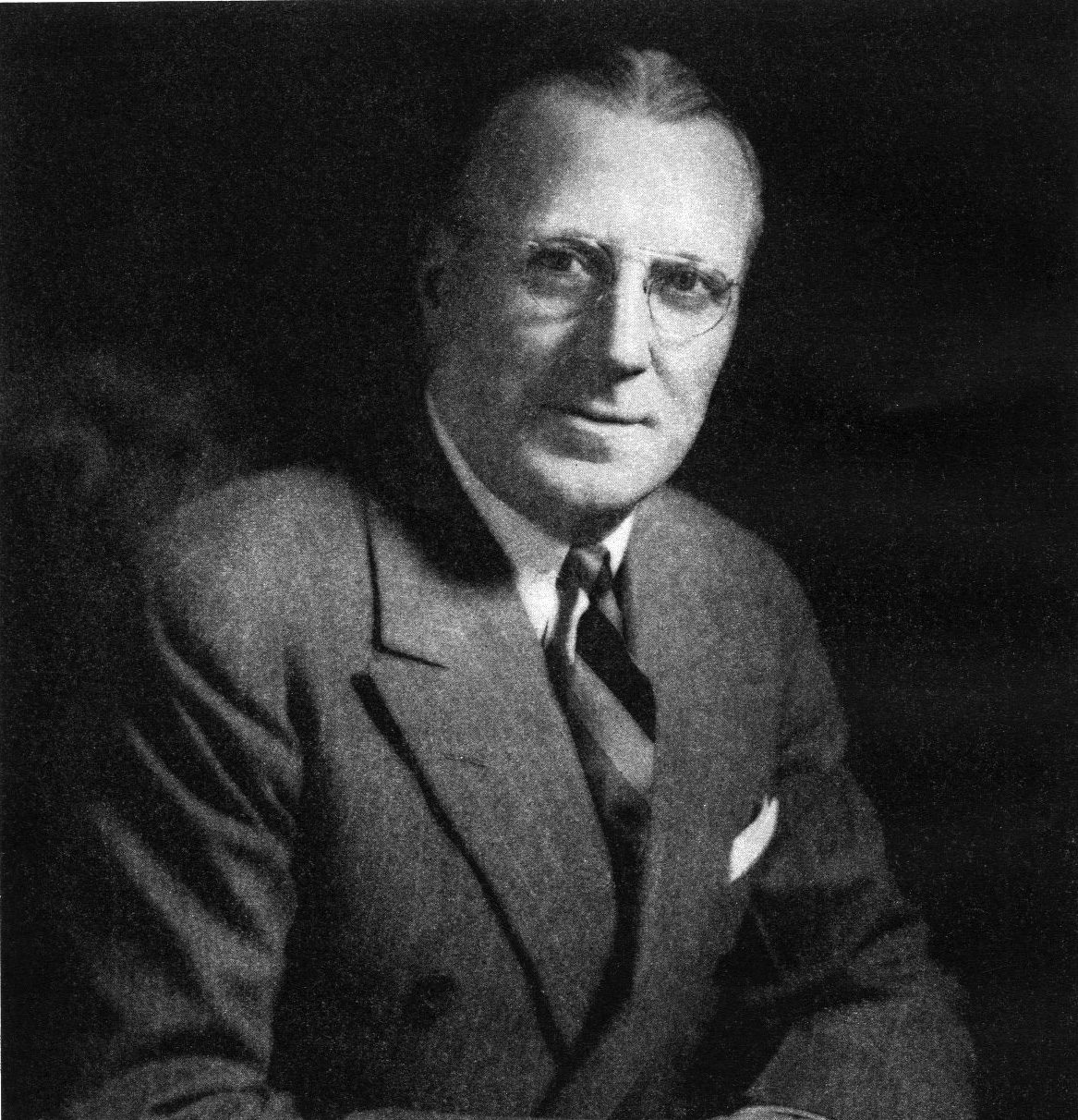
Jock Sutherland served both as a professor of dentistry and a national championship-winning, hall-of-fame football coach at the university.

- Thyrsa Amos (faculty 1919–1941) – dean of women and professor of Education; founder and first president of the Pennsylvania Association of Deans of Women; founder of the Lambda Sigma; president of the National Association of Deans of Women (NADW)
- Kathleen M. Blee (faculty) – gender and race sociologist
- Kathleen Musante DeWalt – director of the Center for Latin American Studies – University of Pittsburgh
- Joseph W. Eaton (faculty 1959–2012) – sociologist who published widely in the fields of social work, sociology, public health, and public and international affairs
- Daniel Everett (1988–1999) – linguist
- John Henry Hopkins (faculty 1820s) – eighth presiding bishop of the US Episcopal Church
- Michael Lovell (ENGR 1989, '91, '94, ENGR faculty) – former chancellor of University of Wisconsin-Milwaukee; president of Marquette University
- Johnny Majors – head football coach at the University of Pittsburgh 1973-76 and 1993–96; National Championship in 1976
- John Markoff (faculty) – historical democratization sociologist
- Fred Rogers (faculty SIS) – creator and host of Mister Rogers' Neighborhood
- Jock Sutherland (A&S, faculty) – Hall of Fame football coach; All-American Football player; Pitt Professor of Dentistry
- Glenn Scobey Warner – "Pop" Warner; head football coach at the University of Pittsburgh, 1915–1923; coached his teams to 33 straight major wins and three national championships (1915, 1916 and 1918)

== See also ==
- List of University of Pittsburgh alumni
