= Ellen Cohn =

American speech-language pathologist and educator

Ellen R. Cohn
- Education: Douglass College, Rutgers University (BA); Vanderbilt University (MS); University of Pittsburgh (PhD)
- Known for: Founding editor of the International Journal of Telerehabilitation
- Awards: Fellow of the American Speech-Language-Hearing Association (2013); Fellow of the American Telemedicine Association (2025); National Academies of Practice, Speech-Language Pathology Academy, Professional Member (inducted 2025)
- Scientific career
- Fields: Speech-language pathology Telerehabilitation; Communication
- Workplaces: University of Pittsburgh; University of Maryland Global Campus
- Thesis: A multiview videofluoroscopic study of Passavant's ridge in patients with and without velopharyngeal insufficiency (1980)

Ellen R. Cohn is an American speech-language pathologist and educator. She was a professor of communication science and disorders at the University of Pittsburgh and an associate dean in its School of Health and Rehabilitation Sciences. She is a part-time instructor in the university's Department of Communication and Rhetoric and an adjunct professor at the University of Maryland Global Campus.

Cohn's early research was on speech in people with cleft palate. She later turned to telerehabilitation, the use of telecommunication to deliver rehabilitation services at a distance. In 2008 she founded the International Journal of Telerehabilitation, which she edits with Jana Cason. She has also worked on disability law programs, educational technology and diversity in university teaching. She is a Fellow of the American Speech-Language-Hearing Association (ASHA) and of the American Telemedicine Association (ATA), and in 2025 she was inducted into the National Academies of Practice.

== Education ==
Cohn earned a bachelor's degree at Douglass College of Rutgers University in 1974 and a master's degree at Vanderbilt University in 1975. She completed her PhD at the University of Pittsburgh in 1980. Her dissertation was a multiview videofluoroscopic study of Passavant's ridge in patients with and without velopharyngeal insufficiency. Passavant's ridge is a bulge on the wall of the pharynx. A 1979 paper from this work found that the ridge was the main structure closing or narrowing the passage between the throat and nose during speech in 37 percent of the patients studied. Her early papers were published under the name Ellen Rassas Glaser.

== Career ==
=== Cleft palate research ===
Cohn began her career as a speech-language pathologist at the University of Pittsburgh's Cleft Palate-Craniofacial Center. With the radiologist M. Leon Skolnick and Betty Jane McWilliams, she studied ways of assessing velopharyngeal function in people with cleft palate. A 1981 study of 48 patients with repaired clefts compared four methods and found that videofluoroscopy agreed best with what the patients' speech predicted. Other papers looked at the limits of the barium pharyngogram and at the use of a barium coating of the nasopharynx in lateral videofluoroscopy.

Skolnick and Cohn wrote Videofluoroscopic Studies of Speech in Patients with Cleft Palate (Springer-Verlag, 1989). The book describes the equipment and methods of multiview videofluoroscopy and how to read the results. She also started a free online archive of the Cleft Palate Journal for the years 1964 to 1989, working with the University of Pittsburgh's library system, which hosts it. Cohn is a member of the specialty review board of the Cleft Palate-Craniofacial Journal. With Karen Golding-Kushner she wrote the chapter on telepractice speech intervention in the textbook Cleft Palate Speech Intervention Across the Lifespan (2026), edited by Linda Vallino-Napoli and Dennis Ruscello.

=== University of Pittsburgh ===
At the university, Cohn directed the Speech and Hearing Clinic and was clinical coordinator for the master's program in speech-language pathology. She later moved into administration in the School of Health and Rehabilitation Sciences, serving first as assistant dean for instruction and then as associate dean for instructional development. She was also interim director of the school's undergraduate rehabilitation program, and she became a full professor in the Department of Communication Science and Disorders.

Cohn has also held posts outside her own school. She had a secondary appointment in the School of Pharmacy, and she is an affiliate member of the McGowan Institute for Regenerative Medicine. For the School of Law she co-wrote two programs, a certificate in disability law and a Master of Studies in Law concentration in disability law. She was elected secretary of the University Senate in 2006, for a one-year term.

Cohn moved to part-time teaching in the university's Department of Communication and Rhetoric, where her courses have included organizational and nonverbal communication. She is also an adjunct professor at the University of Maryland Global Campus.

=== Telerehabilitation and telepractice ===
Cohn was a co-investigator at the Rehabilitation Engineering Research Center on Telerehabilitation at Pittsburgh, which was funded by the National Institute on Disability and Rehabilitation Research. With Sajeesh Kumar of the University of Tennessee Health Science Center, she edited Telerehabilitation (Springer, 2013), part of the publisher's Health Informatics series. The book has chapters on telerehabilitation in speech-language pathology, audiology, occupational therapy and the military, among other areas.

Cohn chaired the Telerehabilitation Special Interest Group of the American Telemedicine Association. In 2011 she was the lead author of a report by the group's licensure portability working group. It described how state-by-state licensing makes it hard for therapists to treat clients across state lines. She also served on the ATA board of directors and was one of the authors of the association's 2017 principles for delivering telerehabilitation services.

Within ASHA, Cohn founded Special Interest Group 18 on telepractice, which was established in October 2010, and she served as its coordinator. Much of her writing on telepractice deals with ethics and state licensure. Her 2019 article with the occupational therapist Jana Cason, "Ethical Considerations for Client-Centered Telepractice", received an ASHA Editor's Award.

Part of her telepractice work concerns people who use augmentative and alternative communication (AAC). In 2012 she set up and moderated a working group on tele-AAC at a research symposium of the International Society for Augmentative and Alternative Communication in Pittsburgh. The group, which included Nerissa Hall and Michelle L. Gutmann, wrote a resolution calling for more research on tele-AAC and for training in how to provide it. Cohn, Hall, Gutmann and Jenifer Juengling-Sudkamp later edited Tele-AAC: Augmentative and Alternative Communication Through Telepractice (2020) and the textbook Fundamentals of AAC: A Case-Based Approach to Enhancing Communication (2023).

At a March 2022 workshop of the National Academies of Sciences, Engineering, and Medicine, Cohn spoke about using telepractice to assess speech, language and swallowing disorders in adults. The workshop was held at the request of the Social Security Administration to examine telehealth in disability evaluations. She also co-wrote a chapter on ethical questions raised by new technologies for a 2026 book on artificial intelligence, extended reality and automation in speech-language pathology.

=== International Journal of Telerehabilitation ===
Cohn founded the International Journal of Telerehabilitation (IJT) in 2008. It grew out of the Rehabilitation Engineering Research Center on Telerehabilitation, and its first issue came out in September 2009. IJT is an open access journal indexed in PubMed and Scopus. The University of Pittsburgh's library system published it until January 2025, when it moved to Hawaii Pacific University. Cohn and Jana Cason are its co-editors-in-chief.

After Russia invaded Ukraine in February 2022, Cohn worked with the university library's publishing office to help Ukrainian scientists publish their research. IJT published a special issue in May 2022 with work on hybrid e-rehabilitation services from the V.M. Glushkov Institute of Cybernetics. It appeared one week after the first submission arrived. Cohn also helped the same research group find a publisher for an e-book, which was issued by Iowa State University Digital Press.

=== Diversity in higher education ===
Cohn was a fellow of the provost's faculty diversity seminar at the university in 2005. The seminar helped faculty add more diverse perspectives to their courses. With two other fellows, Jerome Branche and John W. Mullennix, she edited Diversity Across the Curriculum: A Guide for Faculty in Higher Education (2007). Cohn edited the health sciences section. In 2023 she co-edited Diversity in Higher Education Remote Learning: A Practical Guide with Paula K. Davis and Branche. The book deals with inclusive teaching in online and hybrid courses.

Her other books include two textbooks. With John W. Gareis she wrote Communication as Culture: An Introduction to the Communication Process, which reached its fifth edition in 2024. With Shelly S. Chabon she edited The Communication Disorders Casebook: Learning by Example (2011), a collection of clinical cases. A second edition, with Dorian Lee-Wilkerson as a third editor, was published by Plural Publishing in 2025.

=== Educational technology ===
Cohn has also written about the use of technology in university teaching. In 2004 she and five Pittsburgh colleagues reported in EDUCAUSE Quarterly on an audit of how a failure of the campus network would affect academic units. Faculty members from a subcommittee of the provost's Council on Academic Computing had carried out interviews at 25 sites in 2001.

In another 2004 article, she and the law professor Bernard Hibbitts proposed a "lifetime personal web space". The idea was that every citizen would be given a personal web space at birth and keep it for life. They presented it as a step beyond the electronic portfolio, which hundreds of universities were then studying or using. A 2010 article by Cohn argued that online courses should be planned so they keep running during emergencies such as an influenza pandemic. It set out ways to make courses "disruption-resistant".

== Community work ==
Outside the university, Cohn served two terms as president of the Ladies Hospital Aid Society in Pittsburgh, from 1988 to 1990 and from 1996 to 1997. The society was formed in 1898 to create a hospital in the city where Jewish patients could be treated and Jewish doctors could practice, and it later raised money for Montefiore Hospital.

== Recognition ==
Cohn was named a Fellow of ASHA in 2013. In 2025 she was inducted into the Speech-Language Pathology Academy of the National Academies of Practice, a body of health professionals from many fields. The same year the American Telemedicine Association inducted her into its College of Fellows.

== Selected books ==
- Skolnick, M. Leon; Cohn, Ellen R. (1989). Videofluoroscopic Studies of Speech in Patients with Cleft Palate. New York: Springer-Verlag. ISBN 978-0-387-96958-9.
- Branche, Jerome; Mullennix, John W.; Cohn, Ellen R., eds. (2007). Diversity Across the Curriculum: A Guide for Faculty in Higher Education. Bolton, MA: Anker Publishing. ISBN 978-1-933371-28-3.
- Chabon, Shelly S.; Cohn, Ellen R., eds. (2011). The Communication Disorders Casebook: Learning by Example. Upper Saddle River, NJ: Pearson. ISBN 978-0-205-61012-9.
- Kumar, Sajeesh; Cohn, Ellen R., eds. (2013). Telerehabilitation. Health Informatics. London: Springer. doi:10.1007/978-1-4471-4198-3. ISBN 978-1-4471-4197-6.
- Hall, Nerissa; Juengling-Sudkamp, Jenifer; Gutmann, Michelle L.; Cohn, Ellen R., eds. (2020). Tele-AAC: Augmentative and Alternative Communication Through Telepractice. San Diego: Plural Publishing. ISBN 978-1-63550-145-2.
- Hall, Nerissa; Juengling-Sudkamp, Jenifer; Gutmann, Michelle L.; Cohn, Ellen R., eds. (2023). Fundamentals of AAC: A Case-Based Approach to Enhancing Communication. San Diego: Plural Publishing. ISBN 978-1-63550-353-1.
- Davis, Paula K.; Cohn, Ellen R.; Branche, Jerome C., eds. (2023). Diversity in Higher Education Remote Learning: A Practical Guide. Cham: Palgrave Macmillan. doi:10.1007/978-3-031-31214-4. ISBN 978-3-031-31213-7.
- Gareis, John W.; Cohn, Ellen R. (2024). Communication as Culture: An Introduction to the Communication Process (5th ed.). Dubuque, IA: Kendall Hunt.
- Chabon, Shelly S.; Cohn, Ellen R.; Lee-Wilkerson, Dorian, eds. (2025). The Communication Disorders Casebook: Learning by Example (2nd ed.). San Diego: Plural Publishing. ISBN 978-1-63550-409-5.
