= Elizabeth Krupinski =

Professor of Medical Imaging

Elizabeth Anne Krupinski
- Education: Cornell University; Montclair State University; Temple University
- Scientific career
- Workplaces: University of Arizona; Emory University

Elizabeth Anne Krupinski (born December 4, 1960) is a Professor and Vice Chair for Research of Radiology & Imaging Sciences at Emory University. She works on the perception of medical images and decision-making. Dr. Krupinski is a Fellow of SPIE, Fellow of the Society Imaging Informatics in Medicine (SIIM), Fellow of the American Telemedicine Association(ATA) and Fellow of the American Institute for Medical & Biological Engineering (AIMBE). She has previously served as Chair for the SPIE Medical Imaging Conference, Chair of SIIM, President of the American Telemedicine Association, President of the Medical Image Perception Society (MIPS) and Vice President of the Society for Education and the Advancement of Research in Connected Health (SEARCH).

== Early life and education ==
Krupinski studied experimental psychology at Cornell University, and graduated in 1984. She moved to Montclair State University for her graduate studies, where she was named most outstanding student in arts and sciences. Krupinski earned a doctorate in experimental psychology at Temple University in 1990, where she was a Dean's Fellow.

== Career and research ==
She served as Professor in the Department of Radiology, Psychology and Public Health at Arizona State University from 1992. In 2013, she was elected President of the Medical Image Perception Society, a group of academics who study the process of information perception and recognition in medical images. Since 2015, Krupinski has served as Professor at Emory University, where she is based in the Department of Radiology. She serves a Vice Chair for Research and leads the Imaging Implantation Division. Her research considers medical decision-making and telemedicine, and the future of medical imaging.

Medical images are used by physicians to make decisions about diagnosis and treatment, a process which involves visual inspection and interpretation. These two aspects make use of perception and cognition. As medical imaging has become more significant in the training of physicians, Krupinski has called for better understanding of how clinicians interact with images. Image interpretation is an art; and Krupinski looks to optimise the presentation of medical images to both educate trainees and ensure better patient outcomes. It is estimated the mistakes in assessing medical images accounts for almost 30 % of the errors in radiology. With the rise of artificial intelligence in assessing medical images, Krupinski has called for the need for a balance of human intelligence. She serves as Co-Director of the Southwest Telehealth Resource Center.

She was inducted into the College of Fellows of both the American Institute for Medical and Biological Engineering and SPIE in 2017. She was awarded the American Telemedicine Association award for Individual Leadership. Krupinski is an executive editor for the Journal of Telemedicine and Telecare. She is also a new editor-in-chief for the Journal of Digital Imaging.

== Awards and honors ==
- Fellow, American Institute for Medical and Biological Engineering
- Fellow, SPIE
- American Telemedicine Association's Individual Leadership Award
- Distinguished Investigator, Academy of Radiology Research

== Selected publications ==
- Krupinski, Elizabeth A. (2019). The Handbook of Medical Image Perception and Techniques. Cambridge University Press. ISBN 978-1-107-19488-5.
- Krupinski, Elizabeth A. (March 2014). "Telemedicine, Telehealth, and Mobile Health Applications That Work: Opportunities and Barriers". The American Journal of Medicine. 127 (3): 183–187. doi:10.1016/j.amjmed.2013.09.032. PMID 24384059.
- Krupinski, Elizabeth A. (August 2009). "Overview of telepathology, virtual microscopy, and whole slide imaging: prospects for the future". Human Pathology. 40 (8): 1057–1069. doi:10.1016/j.humpath.2009.04.006. PMID 19552937.
