= Brubaker (disambiguation) =

Brubaker is a 1980 American prison drama film.

Brubaker may also refer to:

- Brubaker Box, kit car model designed by Curtis Brubaker
- Brubaker (surname), a surname
- Howard Brubaker, a character in the film The April Fools
