= Brienza (surname) =

Brienza is a surname. Notable people with the surname include:

- David M. Brienza (born 1964), American professor
- Fabrizio Brienza (born 1969), Italian model and actor
- Franco Brienza (born 1979), Italian footballer
- Nicola Brienza (born 1980), Italian basketball coach
