= Bicycle Health =

Virtual opioid use disorder treatment company

- Type: Medication assisted treatment provider
- Industry: Healthcare
- Founded: 2017
- Founder: Ankit Gupta
- Headquarters: Boston
- Area served: 25 states in United States
- Key people: Ankit Gupta (Founder and CEO), Chris Norris (CTO), Justin Guadagno (CCO)
- Website: https://www.bicyclehealth.com/

Bicycle Health is a virtual medication assisted treatment provider for opioid use disorder (OUD). The Boston-based company was started in 2017 and was named a TIME 100 Most Influential Company in 2022.

== History ==
Bicycle Health was founded in 2017 by Ankit Gupta. Initially the company operated a clinic in Redwood City, California, but during the COVID-19 pandemic, it began providing virtual treatment methods.

The company's seed round of funding was led by SignalFire and other angel investors in May 2020. In June 2022, it raised $50 million in series B funding round, bringing its total fundraise to date to $83 million. The round was led by InterAlpen Partners and other investors like Questa Capital, Frist Cressey Ventures, City Light Capital and Cobalt Ventures.

Bicycle Health has partnerships with several insurance companies including Aetna, Blue Cross/Blue Shield, Cigna (Evernorth), Medicaid and UnitedHealth Group#UnitedHealthcare. It has also collaborated with emergency telehealth provider, Tele911, clinician mental health provider, Marvin and healthcare technology company, Bamboo Health.

In January 2022, Bicycle Health became a council member of the ATA Action Founding Advocacy launched by The American Telemedicine Association.

== Description ==
Bicycle Health provides opioid use disorder, specifically the suboxone (buprenorphine) therapy, via telemedicine. It also offers medication management, support groups, at-home drug testing, patient monitoring and care coordination. As of October 2022, Bicycle Health has served 18,000 patients by its services in 29 states.

The company was recognized as one of the TIME100 Most Influential Company in March 2022.
