= Computationally Advanced Infrastructure Partnerships Center =

Technology center at Rutgers University

The Computationally Advanced Infrastructure Partnerships (CAIP) Center (formerly the Center for Advanced Information Processing) is an advanced technology center at Rutgers University. The center was established in 1985 with the support of the New Jersey Commission on Science and Technology to build upon research in computer-oriented disciplines and to foster collaboration between the university and industry.

The center conducts ongoing research in such fields as VLSI, machine vision, virtual reality, robotics, and software engineering. Much of the research produced by the center is of international significance. The Man-Machine Interface Laboratory has received international recognition in the academic and popular literature for its achievements in virtual rehabilitation The center has collaborated with the Department of Homeland Security and other agencies in developing algorithms for machine-assisted baggage searches, weapons detection and identification, and emergency communications.
