= Brubaker (surname) =

Brubaker is a surname. Notable people with this surname include:

- Bill Brubaker (1910–1978), American baseball player
- Bruce Brubaker, American pianist, recording artist
- Bruce Brubaker (baseball) (born 1941), American pitcher
- Christine Brubaker, Canadian actress
- Clifford E. Brubaker, American academic
- Ed Brubaker (born 1966), American comic writer
- Harold J. Brubaker (born 1946), politician
- Howard Brubaker (1882−1957), American magazine editor and writer
- J. T. Brubaker (born 1993), American baseball player
- James D. Brubaker (1937–2023), American actor
- Jeff Brubaker (born 1958), American ice hockey player
- Rockne Brubaker (born 1986), American pair skater
- Rogers Brubaker (born 1956), sociologist
