= Virtual reality in telerehabilitation =

Method in telerehabilitation

Virtual reality in telerehabilitation is a method used first in the training of musculoskeletal patients using asynchronous patient data uploading, and an internet video link. Subsequently, therapists using virtual reality-based telerehabilitation prescribe exercise routines via the web which are then accessed and executed by patients through a web browser. Therapists then monitor the patient's progress via the web and modify the therapy asynchronously without real-time interaction or training.

== Background ==
The computer technology that allows development three-dimensional virtual environments consists of both hardware and software. The current popular, technical, and scientific interest in virtual environments is inspired, in large part, by the advent and availability of increasingly powerful and affordable visually oriented, interactive, graphical display systems and techniques lacking only sense and sensibility.

The term "virtualized reality" (VR) was coined and introduced in a paper by Kanade. The traditional virtual reality world is typically constructed using simplistic, artificially created computer-aided design (CAD) models. VR starts with the real-world scene and virtualizes it. Virtual reality is a practical, affordable technology for the practice of clinical medicine, and modern, high-fidelity virtual reality systems have practical applications in areas ranging from psychiatry to surgical planning and telemedicine. Through VR's capacity to allow the creation and control of dynamic 3-dimensional, ecologically valid stimulus environments within which behavioral response can be recorded and measured, it offers clinical assessment and rehabilitation options not available with traditional methods.

== Application ==
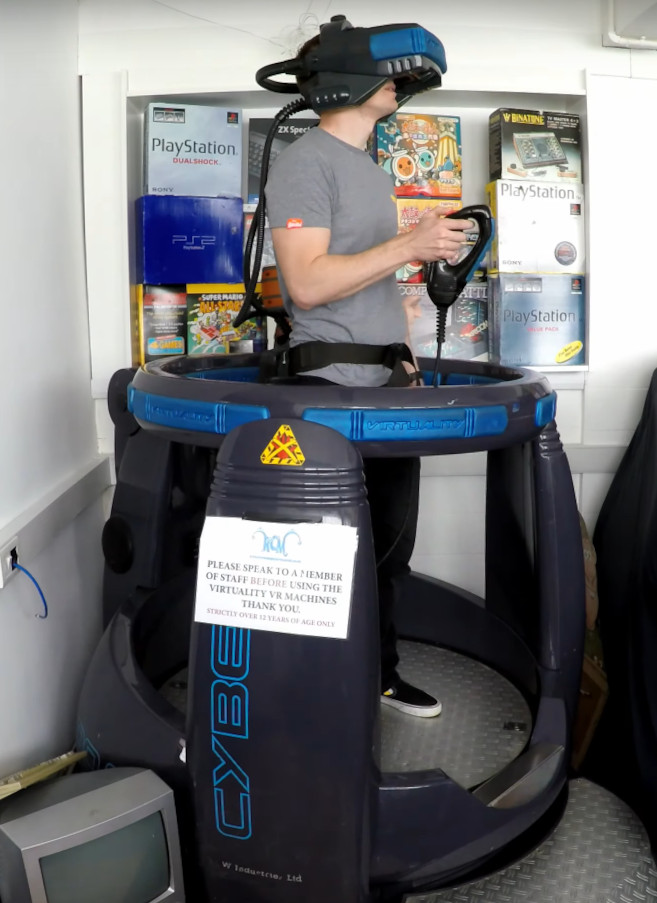

The value of VR systems for the investigation and rehabilitation of cognitive and perceptual impairments and current and potential applications of VR technology address six neurorehabilitation issues. Korean researchers developed and assessed the value of a new rehabilitation training system to improve postural balance control by combining virtual reality technology with an unfixed bicycle. The system was effective as a training device; in addition, the technology might have a wider applicability to the rehabilitation field.

Tracy and Lathan investigated the relationship between motor tasks and participants' spatial abilities by training participants within a VR based simulator and then observing their ability to transfer training from the simulator to the real world. The study demonstrated that subjects with lower spatial abilities achieved significant positive transfer from a simulator based training task to a similar real world robotic operation task.

Virtual environments were applied to assess the training of inexperienced powered wheelchair users and demonstrated that the two virtual environments represent a potentially useful means of assessing and training novice powered wheelchair users. A recently completed project at the University of Strathclyde has resulted in the development of a wheelchair motion platform which, in conjunction with a virtual reality facility, can be used to address issues of accessibility in the built environment.

Many cases have applied virtual reality technology to telemedicine and telerehabilitation service development. Because telemedicine focuses principally on transmitting medical information, VR has potential to enhance the practice. One significant advancement is the use of VR in telerehabilitation to help patients overcome geographic and mobility barriers by enabling them to engage in therapy remotely. This is particularly important in regions with limited access to healthcare services, where VR-based telerehabilitation can significantly improve patient outcomes without requiring physical attendance at medical facilities. State of the art of VR-based telemedicine applications is used in remote or augmented surgery as well as in surgical training, both of which are critically dependent on eye–hand coordination. Recently, however, different researchers have tried to use virtual environments in medical visualization and for assessment and rehabilitation in neuropsychology.

Case studies for VR applications were conducted that were internet deliverable and they identified technical, practical, and user challenges of remote VR treatment programs. To improve understanding of deficits in autism and in left visual-spatial neglect, Trepagnier et al. investigated face gaze behavior in autism and right hemisphere stroke, using virtual reality and gaze sensing technology.

An at-home stroke telerehabilitation service was developed using virtual reality haptics. Researchers from Rutgers University and Stanford University developed a virtual reality-based orthopedic telerehabilitation system.

The use of virtual reality technologies in the rehabilitation of patients with vestibular system disorders and in the provision of remote medical consultation for those patients. He stated that an appropriately designed VR experience could greatly increase the rate of adaptation in these patients.

== Accessibility ==
While VR enables greater accessibility for some, it also carries the risk of exclusion for others, particularly those without adequate resources to access VR technology and those with disabilities that restrict them from the use of virtual reality in telerehabilitation.

Remote VR treatment programs require both a stable access to the internet and varying VR equipment. With one third of the world population not having any access to the internet, the access to remote VR treatment programs might be limited. At the same time, the price of the VR headset combined with the specialized accessories for the remote VR treatment programs may exacerbate existing economic disparities in healthcare.

Epilepsy is a chronic neurological disorder that is typically the case of recurrent seizures. These seizures are sudden, temporary alterations of brain function that cause involuntary movements, sensations, or changes in consciousness. These epileptic episodes can be triggered by various light patterns. With VR being a bright screen so close to the eyes, epilepsy patients are generally excluded from VR telerehabilitation due to the concern that using it may trigger seizures.

== Statistics ==
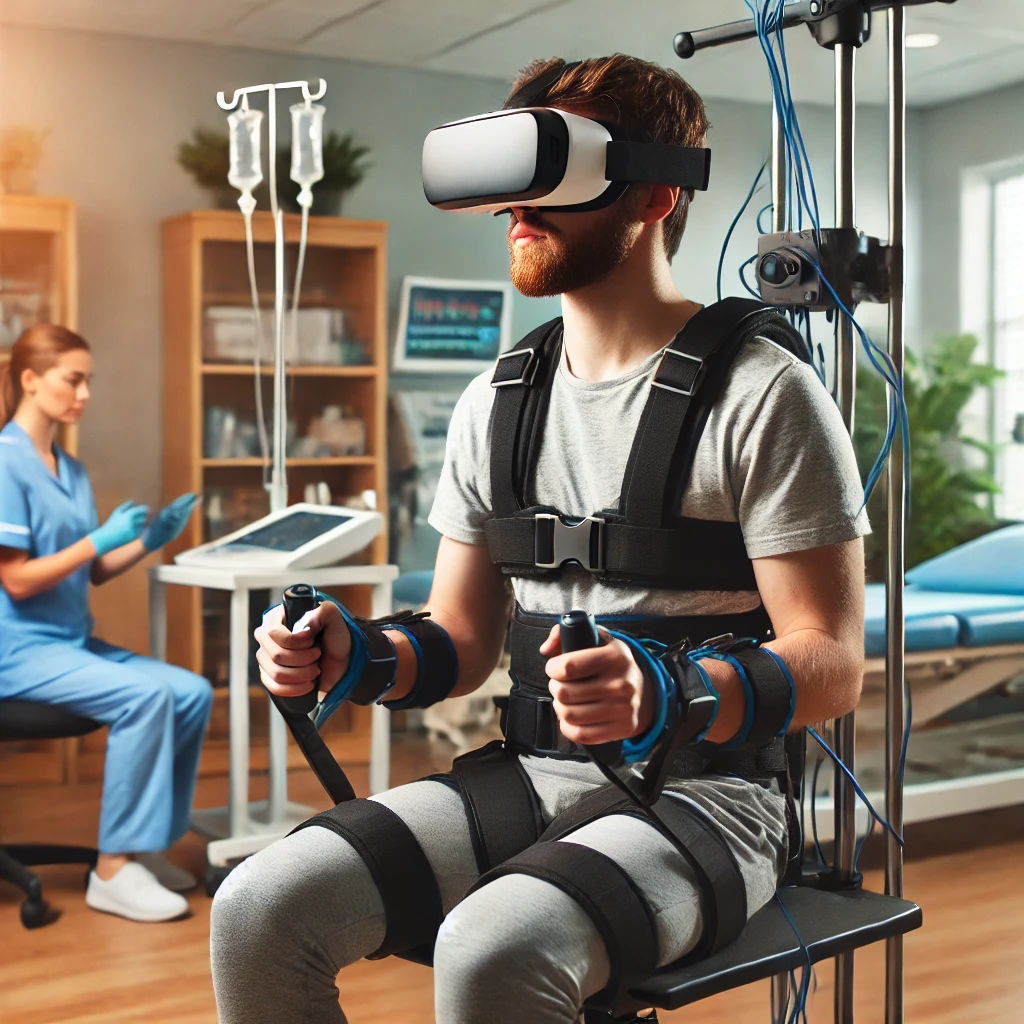

Telerehabilitation has made a huge improvement in rehab accessibility and efficiency. For instance, in fields such as Musculoskeletal Rehabilitation, Stroke Recovery, Parkinson's Disease, and Chronic Pain Management in Cancer Patients, improvements have been quite apparent.

Musculoskeletal Rehabilitation:

Virtual Reality plays a part in musculoskeletal rehab. Studies show that 80% of patients using VR for muscle and joint issues reported better mobility and pain relief. Because VR makes exercises more immersive, patients are more likely to stick with their routines, which speeds up their recovery.

Stroke Recovery:

Virtual reality has made a huge difference in patients who have had recent strokes. Patients who participated in VR therapy reportedly improved their motor function abilities by 20% after just four weeks. Since Virtual Reality boosts neuroplasticity, which allows the brain the ability to rewire itself, this greatly impacts the patient in a positive manner. By having patients do controlled movements in VR, it will allow them to regain control of their bodily functions faster and more efficiently. This is life-changing as this in many cases will allow the patient to be able to perform everyday tasks once again.

Parkinson's Disease:

Patients with Parkinson's Disease who engage in VR-based rehabilitation have shown a 30% reduction in fall risk along with notable improvements in gait speed and balance. Since older adults with Parkinson's have a much greater risk of falling, this statistic remains very important. With this VR technology patients can practice balance and coordination in simulated virtual environments without the risk of falling and injuring themselves, making this method more safe and effective.

Chronic Pain Management in Cancer Patients

Virtual Reality therapy has provided much comfort and relief to cancer patients who have reported unbearable pain. According to data from Cedars-Sinai Medical Center, patients using Virtual Reality reported a decrease of about 1.7 points on the pain scale compared to those who were going through traditional pain management methods such as watching relaxing TV channels or listening to soothing music. This means that the immersive VR provides therapy for patients through a distraction method. Putting their focus on the Virtual environments rather than their pain makes it a lot easier to deal with. This also results in the patient's mental well-being improving significantly during the therapy sessions.

== See also ==
- Computationally Advanced Infrastructure Partnerships Center
