= J. Scott Yaruss =

American speech pathology expert

J. Scott Yaruss is a professor of communicative sciences and disorders at Michigan State University and president of Stuttering Therapy Resources, Inc., a specialty publishing company that develops materials to help speech-language pathologists help people who stutter.

Yaruss was formerly an associate professor at University of Pittsburgh School of Health and Rehabilitation Sciences and co-director of Stuttering Center of Western Pennsylvania.

Yaruss's research focuses on assessing and addressing the adverse impact experienced by people who stutter. He is co-author of the Overall Assessment of the Speaker's Experience of Stuttering (OASES) and several therapy guides, all published by Stuttering Therapy Resources.

In December 2005, Yaruss was named a fellow by the American Speech-Language-Hearing Association (ASHA). In November 2025, Yaruss received ASHA Honors. These awards are made to ASHA members made significant contributions of a national or international nature to their professions. The status of fellow and honors are retained for life and reflect the highest honors awarded by ASHA.
