= Detre =

Detre may refer to:

- László Detre (microbiologist) (1874–1939), Hungarian physician who suggested the concept of antigens
- László Detre (astronomer) (1906–1974), Hungarian astronomer
- Thomas Detre (1924-2010), Hungarian-American psychiatrist and "visionary" academic leader
- 1538 Detre, an asteroid named after the astronomer
- Detre Bebek (14th–15th century), a palatine in the Kingdom of Hungary (hu:Bebek Detre)
- Constant Detré (1891–1945), Hungarian-French artist
