= David M. Brienza =

American scientist

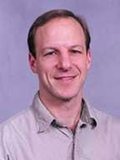
- Born: October 21, 1964 (age 61); New Rochelle, New York
- Education: University of Notre Dame University of Virginia

David M. Brienza is a professor of rehabilitation science at the University of Pittsburgh School of Health and Rehabilitation Sciences. He holds additional professorial appointments in bioengineering and electrical engineering.

== Biography ==
Brienza earned a B.S. from the University of Notre Dame in Electrical Engineering (1986) and a M.S. (1988) and Ph.D. (1991) in Electrical Engineering from the University of Virginia. From 1987 to 1991, he worked as a research assistant at the Rehabilitation Engineering Center at the University of Virginia, and in 1991 he joined the faculty of the University of Pittsburgh.

Currently, he is the director of the Seating and Soft Tissue Biomechanics Laboratory, and continues to actively pursue research and development in the areas of wheelchair cushions, pressure sore and ulcer prevention, soft tissue biomechanics, telerehabilitation technology and wheelchair technology.

== Selected publications ==
- Kim, JB and Brienza, DM; Development of a remote accessibility assessment system through three-dimensional reconstruction technology. Journal of Rehabilitation Research and Development 2006; 43(2): 257–272.
- Jan, YK and Brienza DM. Technology for Pressure Ulcer Prevention. Topics in Spinal Cord Injury. Spring 2006; 11(4): 30–41.
- Jan YK, Brienza DM, and Geyer MJ. Analysis of week-to-week variability in skin blood flow measurements using wavelet transforms. Clinical Physiology and Functional Imaging 2005; 25(5): 253–262.
- Brienza DM, Geyer MJ, and Jan YK. A comparison of changes in rhythms of sacral skin blood flow in response to heating and indentation. Archives of Physical Medicine and Rehabilitation. 2005 June; (86)6: 1245–1251.
- Brienza, David M. PhD; Geyer, Mary Jo PhD, PT, CWS, CLT-LANA. Using Support Surfaces to Manage Tissue Integrity. Advances in Skin & Wound Care. 18(3):151-157, April 2005
- Geyer MJ, Jan YK, Brienza DM, and Boninger ML. Using wavelet analysis to characterize the thermoregulatory mechanisms of sacral skin blood flow. Journal of Rehabilitation Research and Development 2004; 41(6):797-806.
