= Telerehabilitation =

Delivery of rehabilitation services over the internet

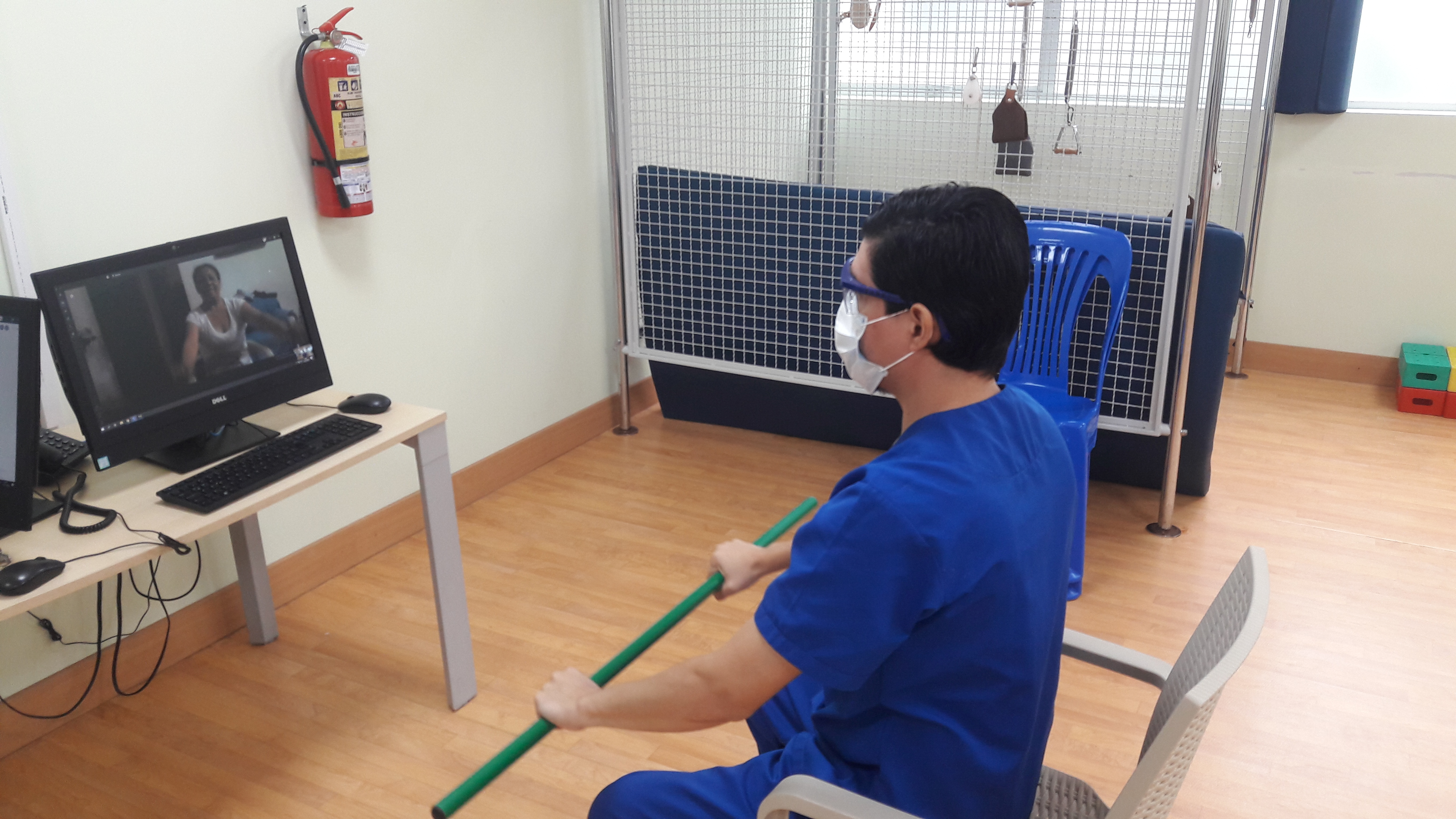
Doctor performing telerehabilitation.

Telerehabilitation (or e-rehabilitation is the delivery of rehabilitation services over telecommunication networks and the internet. Telerehabilitation allows patients to interact with providers remotely and can be used both to assess patients and to deliver therapy. Fields of medicine that utilize telerehabilitation include: physical therapy, occupational therapy, speech-language pathology, audiology, and psychology. Therapy sessions can be individual or community-based. Types of therapy available include motor training exercises, speech therapy, virtual reality, robotic therapy, goal setting, and group exercise.

Commonly used modalities include webcams, videoconferencing, phone lines, videophones and webpages containing rich Internet applications. The visual nature of telerehabilitation technology limits the types of rehabilitation services that can be provided. Telerehabilitation is therefore often combined with other modalities such as in-person therapy.

Important areas of telerehabilitation research include the investigation of new and emerging rehabilitation modalities as well as comparisons between telerehabilitation and in-person therapy in terms of patient functional outcomes, cost, patient satisfaction, and compliance.

As of 2006, only a few health insurers in the United States will reimburse for telerehabilitation services. If the research shows that tele-assessments and tele-therapy are equivalent to clinical encounters, it is more likely that insurers and Medicare will extend coverage to certain telerehabilitation services as was the case during the pandemic (see also Occupational Therapy).

== Technologies ==
1. Plain old telephone service (POTS) with videophones/phones in telerehabilitation
  There are several types of connections used with real time exchanges. Plain old telephone service (POTS) uses standard analog telephone lines. Videophones are used with POTS lines and include a camera, display screen, and telephone. Videophones use telephone lines that are available in most homes, so are easy to set up; however small display screens make them problematic for individuals with vision problems. This can be solved by using a large screen or television as a screen.
2. Videotelephony/Videotelephony in telerehabilitation
  The use of improved quality video-assisted telecommunication devices, such as videoconferencing, webcams and telepresence to assist in treatments.
3. Virtual reality/Virtual reality in telerehabilitation
  Virtual reality in telerehabilitation is one of the newest tools available in that area. This computer technology allows the development of three-dimensional virtual environments.
4. Motion technology/Motion technology in telerehabilitation
5. Web-based approaches/Web-based approaches in telerehabilitation
  Applications that run over the internet, just as if they were installed in your computer (called Rich Internet Applications), represent a new direction in software development. A person subscribes to the website rather than purchase the software. Any updates or changes to the software system are instantly available to all subscribers. The applications can be accessed from any location where one has access to an internet connected computer. Likewise, a patient's data is accessible from where ever the therapist is located. Neither the application nor the patient's data is tied to one computer.
6. Sensors and body monitoring/Sensors and body monitoring in telerehabilitation
7. Haptic technology/Haptic technology in telerehabilitation
8. Artificial intelligence/Artificial intelligence in telerehabilitation
9. Wireless technology/Wireless technology in telerehabilitation
10. PDAs/PDA in telerehabilitation
11. Mobile telephony/Mobile telephony in telerehabilitation
12. Electronic medical records/Electronic medical record telerehabilitation
13. Mobile apps/Mobile apps telerehabilitation
14. Rehabilitation Robotics with telerehabilitation integrated into the therapeutic intervention (e.g., teleevaluation, telesupport, telemonitoring)

== Clinical applications ==
=== Speech-language pathology ===
The clinical services provided by speech-language pathology readily lend themselves to telerehabilitation applications due to the emphasis on auditory and visual communicative interaction between the client and the clinician. As a result, the number of telerehabilitation applications in speech-language pathology tend to outnumber those in other allied health professions. To date, applications have been developed to assess and/or treat acquired adult speech and language disorders, stuttering, voice disorders, speech disorders in children, and swallowing dysfunction. The technology involved in these applications has ranged from the simple telephone (Plain Old Telephone System – POTS) to the use of dedicated Internet-based videoconferencing systems.

Early applications to assess and treat acquired adult speech and language disorders involved the use of the telephone to treat patients with aphasia and motor speech disorders (Vaughan, 1976, Wertz, et al., 1987), a computer controlled video laserdisc over the telephone and a closed-circuit television system to assess speech and language disorders (Wertz et al., 1987), and a satellite-based videoconferencing system to assess patients in rural areas (Duffy, Werven & Aronson, 1997). More recent applications have involved the use of sophisticated Internet-based videoconferencing systems with dedicated software which enable the assessment of language disorders, the treatment of language disorders, and the assessment and treatment of motor speech disorders following brain impairment and Parkinson's disease. Speech and language therapy can also be effectively delivered via video for people with aphasia. Collectively, these studies have revealed positive treatment outcomes, while assessment and diagnoses have been found to be comparable to face-to-face evaluations.

The treatment of stuttering has been adapted to a telerehabilitation environment with notable success. Two Australian studies (Harrison, Wilson & Onslow, 1999; Wilson, Onslow & Lincoln, 2004) involving the distance delivery of the Lidcombe program to children who stutter have utilized the telephone in conjunction with offline video recordings to successfully treat several children. Overall, the parents and children responded positively to the program delivered at a distant. Using a high speed videoconferencing system link, Sicotte, Lehoux, Fortier-Blanc and Leblanc (2003) assessed and treated six children and adolescents with a positive reduction in the frequency of dysfluency that was maintained six months later. In addition, a videoconferencing platform has been used successfully to provide follow-up treatment to an adult who had previously received intensive therapy (Kully, 200).

Reports of telerehabilitation applications in paediatric speech and language disorders are sparse. A recent Australian pilot study has investigated the feasibility of an Internet-based assessment of speech disorder in six children (Waite, Cahill, Theodoros, Russell, Busuttin, in press). High levels of agreement between the online and face-to-face clinicians for single-word articulation, speech intelligibility, and oro-motor tasks were obtained suggesting that the Internet-based protocol had the potential to be a reliable method for assessing paediatric speech disorders.

Voice therapy across a variety of types of voice disorders has been shown to be effectively delivered via a telerehabilitation application. Mashima et al. (2003) using PC based videoconferencing and speech analysis software compared 23 patients treated online with 28 persons treated face-to-face. The authors reported positive post treatment results with no significant difference in measures between the traditional and videoconferencing group, suggesting that the majority of traditional voice therapy techniques can be applied to distance treatment.

Although obvious limitations exist, telerehabilitation applications for the assessment of swallowing function have also been used with success. Lalor, Brown and Cranfield (2000) were able to obtain an initial assessment of the nature and extent of swallowing dysfunction in an adult via a videoconferencing link although a more complete evaluation was restricted due to the inability to physically determine the degree of laryngeal movement. A more sophisticated telerehabilitation application for the assessment of swallowing was developed by Perlman and Witthawaskul (2002) who described the use of real-time videofluoroscopic examination via the Internet. This system enabled the capture and display of images in real-time with only a three to five second delay. There has been considerable research into the assessment and treatment of dysphagia via telerehabilitation, including cost analyses, leading to the establishment of sustainable telerehabilitation services.

There continues to be a need for ongoing research to develop and validate the use of telerehabilitation applications in speech-language pathology in a greater number and variety of adult and paediatric communication and swallowing disorders.

=== Occupational therapy ===
Occupational Therapy Practitioners (OTP), work with people across the lifespan in order to facilitate independence, establish or rehabilitate roles, habits and routines. Occupational Therapy can be administered through means of telehealth, and since telehealth is often being performed in the clients' own environment, carry-over and efficacy of interventions is often increased. There are many types of occupational therapy intervention that can be provided through telehealth. Many positive outcomes have been reported across multiple intervention areas including: motor learning/relearning, ADL/IADL retraining (following CVA, TBI, Cancer, joint replacement, etc), functional cognitive training, home modification assessments, vision rehabilitation, pediatric therapies and family training. It is safe to consider telehealth as an emerging practice area for OTPs with evidence of efficacy mounting from various areas of practice.

Following the COVID-19 Pandemic, Medicare and many private insurance companies swiftly adopted Telehealth as a reimbursable option for provision of occupational therapy services, although Telehealth has been used for many years prior especially in rural areas. As the public health emergency is due to expire, many advocates of telehealth are working towards establishing more permanent measures to protect telehealth as a reimbursed service. The American Occupational Therapy Association (AOTA) and World Federation of Occupational Therapists (WFOT) are both in support of Telehealth as a means to provide care. Most importantly, OTPs themselves are in support of making telehealth a permanent option for service delivery. Telehealth is a promising adjunct to in-person treatment for persons receiving occupational therapy services.

=== Physical therapy ===
For individuals with shoulder pain specifically, research shows that telerehabilitation can be just as effective as in-person physical therapy. Effective interventions given in telerehabilitation for shoulder pain include exercises for shoulder mobility and strength. In addition, it has been found that telerehabilitation, especially for long term treatment such as chronic shoulder pain, is cost and time effective compared to in person therapy. However, one drawback is that manual therapy and the use of modalities, which are important parts in treatment of shoulder pain, are not possible.

Types of Physical rehabilitation therapies delivered through telerehabilitation include strengthening exercises, motor retraining, goal setting, virtual reality, robotic therapy, community-therapy.

Motor strengthening exercises are the most commonly implemented modality. In motor training exercises, a provider guides a patient through performing different motions and activities in order to regain strength and function. Motor training through telerehabilitation has consistently been shown to produce equivalent functional outcomes compared with in-person therapy. However, many patients require in-person therapy initially before transitioning to telerehabilitation.

Goal setting has been used in remote areas where cost and provider availability prohibit access to physical therapy. Patients work with a therapist to set personal goals and track their progress through sessions. Goal setting telerehabilitation has been shown to produce increased patient satisfaction and improvement in activities of daily living compared with a control group receiving no therapy.

Virtual reality therapy involves the use of a sensor to detect movement and a virtual environment displayed on either a screen or headset. Patients perform therapeutic movements that correspond to tasks within the virtual environment. This provides an immersive environment for the patient and allows computerized monitoring of patient progress. Studies that compared virtual reality with motor training exercises have shown equal or better outcomes with virtual reality.

Robotic therapy typically involves the use of hand and foot strengthening robots which provide resistance training and assist the patient with performing movements. Robotic devices can also obtain precise data on patient movements and usage statistics and transmit them to providers for evaluation. Robotic therapy has even been combined with virtual reality telerehabilitation to create a virtual environment which responds to robotic movements. Robotic telerehabilitation studies have shown patient improvement from baseline but equivalent functional outcomes compared with motor training exercises.

Community therapy is used to deliver education and therapy to patients remotely, either through group exercise sessions or through kiosks. Community therapy tends to have lower patient compliance than individualized therapy, but can deliver similar results if appropriately utilized.

=== Chronic respiratory disease ===
Telerehabilitation for chronic respiratory disease

The latest evidence suggests that primary pulmonary rehabilitation and maintenance rehabilitation delivered through telerehabilitation for people with chronic respiratory disease reaches outcomes similar to centre-based rehabilitation. While there are no safety issues identified, the findings are based on evidence limited by a small number of studies.

=== Cardiovascular disease ===
Telerehabilitation for cardiovascular disease

A systematic review of ten studies to measure the effectiveness of telerehabilitation as a means to reach "cardiac rehabilitation" has shown to be considered as an effective and appropriate measure to increase participation in underdeveloped areas. The issue noted in the review was the technical drawbacks of broadband and limited internet connectivity, which limited the participation of willing participants of the study. Addressing this technological gap could help showcase the potential impact of telerehabilitation on cardiac rehabilitation accessibility and participation as well as person-centered, health, and economic outcomes.

=== Axial Spondyloarthritis ===
Telerehabilitation for Axial Spondyloarthritis

There is limited evidence for telerehabilitation in Axial Spondyloarthritis. A recently published study concluded that telerehabilitation was effective on disease activity, mobility and function in patients with Axial Spondyloarthritis. It also concluded that telerehabilitation can be safely applied in patients with Axial Spondyloarthritis, but studies comparing face-to-face and supervised exercises with telerehabilitation are needed.

=== Stroke survivors ===
==== Telerehabilitation for stroke survivors ====
In a 2018 systematic review of 15 studies it was found that there were no significant differences in given tests and measures between telerehabilitation and control groups when it came to post stroke care. This was supported through tests such as Barthel Index, Berg Balance Scale, Fugl-Meyer Upper Extremity, and Stroke Impact Scale. Furthermore, the study goes on to conclude that "Telerehabilitation can be a suitable alternative to usual rehabilitation care in post stroke care especially in remote or underserved areas. Larger studies are needed to evaluate the health-related quality of life and cost-effectiveness with the ongoing improvements in telerehabilitation networks."

==== Standards and training requirements ====
1. Telerehabilitation standards
2. Reimbursement policies/Reimbursement in telerehabilitation
3. Legislative activities/Legislative activities in telerehabilitation
4. Ethics and privacy issues/Ethics and privacy issues in telerehabilitation
5. Clinical and technology training issues

== History ==
In 1999, D.M. Angaran published "Telemedicine and Telepharmacy: Current Status and Future Implications" in the American Journal of Health-System Pharmacy. He provided a comprehensive history of telecommunications, the internet and telemedicine since the 1950s. The Department of Defense (DoD) and the National Aeronautics and Space Administration (NASA) spearheaded the technology in the United States during the Vietnam War and the space program; both agencies continue to fund advances in telemedicine.

Three early adopters of telemedicine were state penitentiary systems, rural health care systems, and the radiology profession. Telemedicine makes business sense for the states because they do not have to pay for security escorts to have a prisoner receive care outside the prison. Rural telemedicine in the United States is heavily subsidized through federal agency grants for telecommunications operations, starting in the 1990s. Most of this funding comes through the Health Services Research Administration and the Department of Commerce. Some state universities have obtained state funding to operate tele-clinics in rural areas. However, few (if any) of these programs are known to financially break-even, mostly because of reimbursement challenges. For instance, the Medicare program for people over age 65 (the largest payer) has been very restrictive about paying for telehealth. This appears to be changing, as in response to the health access challenges during the COVID-19 pandemic, new opportunities for telehealth have emerged within many healthcare networks, including for rehabilitation services.

In contrast, the Veterans Administration is relatively active in using telemedicine for people with disabilities. There are several programs that provide annual physical exams or monitoring and consultation for veterans with spinal cord injuries. Similarly, some state Medicaid programs (for poor people and people with disabilities) have pilot programs using telecommunications to connect rural practitioners with subspecialty therapists. A few school districts in Oklahoma and Hawaii offer school-based rehabilitation therapy using therapy assistants who are directed by a remote therapist. The National Rehabilitation Hospital in Washington DC and Sister Kenny Rehabilitation Institute in Minneapolis provided assessment and evaluations to patients living in Guam and American Samoa. Cases included post-stroke, post-polio, autism, and wheel-chair fitting.

An argument can be made that "telerehabilitation" began in 1998 when NIDRR funded the first RERC on tele-rehabilitation. It was awarded to a consortium of biomedical engineering departments at the National Rehabilitation Hospital and The Catholic University of America, both located in Washington, DC; the Sister Kenny Rehabilitation Institute in Minnesota; and the East Carolina University in North Carolina. Some of this early research work, and its motivation, is reviewed in Winters (2002). The State of Science Conference held in 2002 convened most of military and civilian clinicians, engineers, and government officials interested in using telecommunications as a modality for rehabilitation assessment and therapy; a summary is provided in Rosen, Winters & Lauderdale (2002). The conference was attended by the incoming president of the American Telemedicine Association (ATA). This led to an invitation by ATA to the conference attendees to form a special interest group on telerehabilitation. NIDRR funded the second 5-year RERC on telerehabilitation in 2004, awarding it to the University of Pittsburgh. This RERC was renewed in 2010. The 21-chapter book Telerehabilitation (2013) provides a good summary of the work of these RERCs and various colleagues, covering a wide variety of tele-applications in various rehabilitation fields plus policy issues.

In 2001, O. Bracy, a neuropsychologist, introduced the first web based, rich internet application, for the telerehabilitation presentation of cognitive rehabilitation therapy. This system first provides the subscriber clinician with an economical means of treating their own patients over the internet. Secondly, the system then provides, directly to the patient, the therapy prescription set up and controlled by the member clinician. All applications and response data are transported via the internet in real time. The patient can login to do their therapy from home, the library or anywhere they have access to an internet computer. In 2006, this system formed the basis of a new system designed as a cognitive skills enhancement program for school children. Individual children or whole classrooms can participate in this program over the internet.

In 2006, M.J. McCue and S.E. Palsbo published an article in the Journal of Telemedicine and Telecare that explored how telemedicine can become a profitable business for hospitals. They argue that telerehabilitation should be expanded so that people with disabilities and people in pain (perhaps after hip-replacement surgery or people with arthritis) can get the rehabilitative therapy they need. It is unethical to limit payments for telerehabilitation services only to patients in rural areas.

Research in telerehabilitation has evolved beyond its infancy, with many studies, but most are demonstration projects of smaller size. Rehabilitation researchers need to conduct many more controlled experiments and present the evidence to clinicians (and payers) that telerehabilitation is clinically effective. The discipline of speech-language pathology is ahead of occupational therapy and physical therapy in demonstrating equivalence over various types of telecommunications equipment. One area with dozens of research studies that often involve a telerehabilitation component relates to home telesupported neurorehabilitation therapy for stroke survivors (see sections on Physical Therapy, Stroke Survivors). These employ a suite of interactive goal-directed tasks, tunable by a therapist, that make use of simple robots or devices using game ports (e.g., Feng and Winters, 2007).

== Related organizations ==
- American Telemedicine Association (ATA)
- American Speech-Language-Hearing Association (ASHA)
- National Institute on Disability and Rehabilitation Research (NIDRR)
- Rehabilitation Engineering and Assistive Technology Society of North America (RESNA)
- Special Interest Group on Telerehabilitation (SIGOT)

== See also ==
- Rehabilitation (neuropsychology)
