= Brubaker Box =

Brubaker Box/Automecca sports van
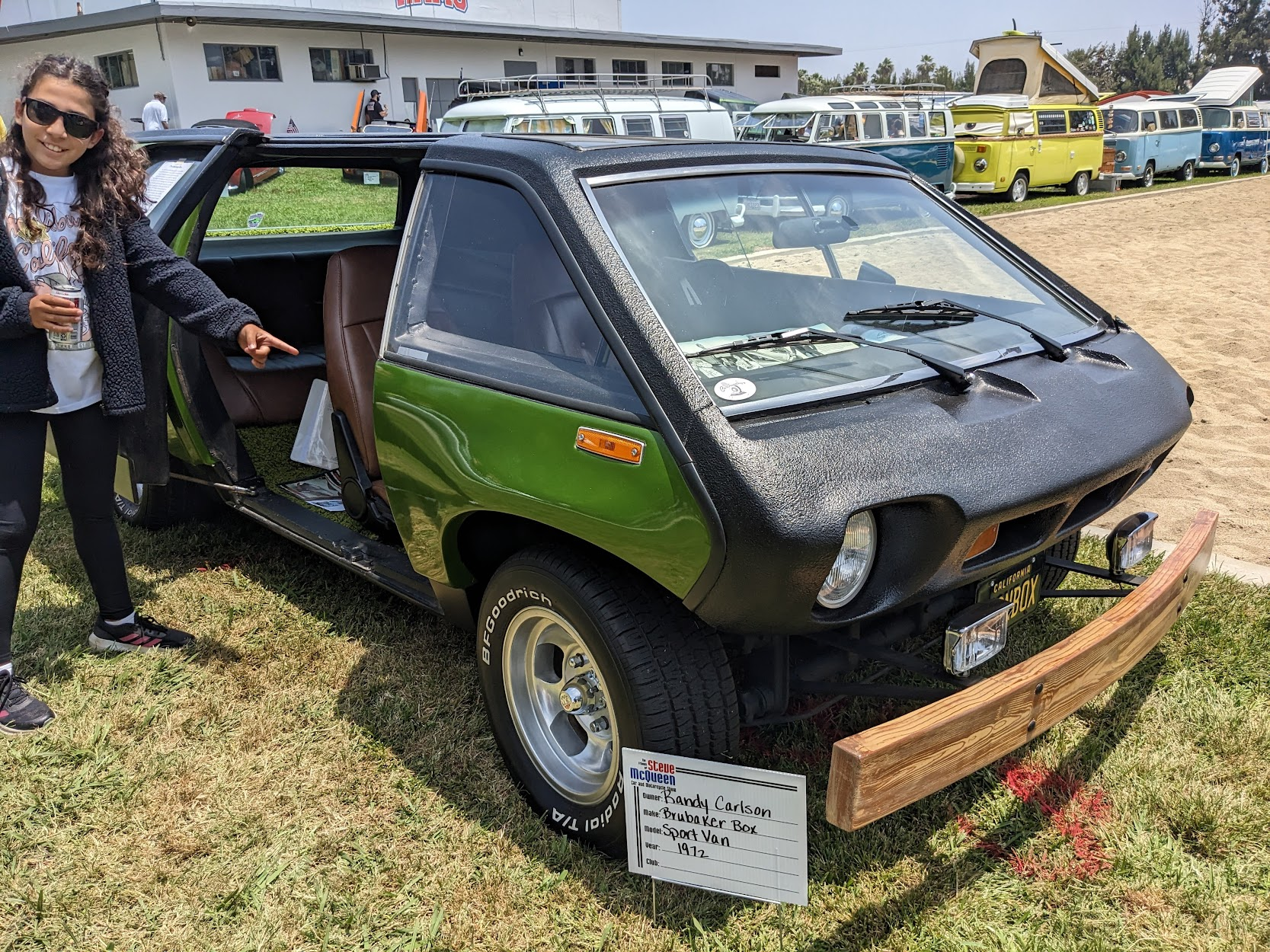
- Brubaker Box Sport Van

Overview
- Manufacturer: Automecca, Brubaker, Various
- Production: 1972–1979

Body and chassis
- Class: Kit car, Minivan
- Layout: Longitudinal rear engine, rear-wheel drive
- Platform: Volkswagen Type 1

The Brubaker Box was a car designed by Curtis Brubaker, Todd Gerstenberger and Harry Wykes. Brubaker got the idea from Volkswagen Minibuses, and attempted to update the concept. The body was designed to fit on the chassis of a Volkswagen Beetle. In 1972 after a deal with Volkswagen could not be reached, Brubaker began buying completed Beetles and converting them to Boxes, selling the excess pieces. However, this scheme did not prove profitable, and very few Boxes were ever constructed. Brubaker filed for bankruptcy the same year. Investors in the company tried to continue manufacturing the Box in various ways, the only success being Mike Hansen's Automecca, located in Chatsworth, California, in 1974 with its Sports Van.

== Construction ==
The Brubaker Box was assembled on a complete Volkswagen Type 1 chassis. Due to the extended length of the body compared to that of a standard Volkswagen Beetle, the foot pedal assembly was relocated forward and up from the standard position. The fuel tank was moved from the front to the center of the vehicle for increased safety.

Constructed from fiberglass, the body was made from thirteen inner and outer panels, including a floor panel, riveted and bonded together. The front windshield was from an AMC Hornet, tail lights from a Datsun Truck, and rear window from a Chevrolet El Camino. The whole body was designed to bolt directly to an unmodified Volkswagen Beetle chassis. In the first prototypes stock front seats from Ford or Volkswagen were retained and a lounge-type seat was created for the rear of the vehicle. To add to the rear seating area, a footstool/cushion was added above the fuel tank. A single sliding door on the right side was the only entrance. The radio and switches were in the driver's side panel. Shock absorbing bumpers of composite construction were designed to look like curved wood. The spare wheel was mounted to absorb frontal crash energy. For sunny days a large removable panel was positioned in the center of the roof panel. To reduce production costs, parts from other vehicles were used. Only three Brubaker Boxes were built. One became the Roamer, on the TV show Ark II. Approximately 25 additional Brubaker Sports Vans were built by Mike Hansen's AutoMecca before production ceased.
