= José-Alain Sahel =

French ophthalmologist and scientist

- Born: French Algeria
- Education: University of Strasburg
- Awards: The Legion of Honour (2008); National Order of Merit (2002); Wolf Prize in Medicine (2024)
- Scientific career
- Fields: Ophthalmology
- Workplaces: The Vision Institute, Paris, The Vision Institute, Pittsburgh

José-Alain Sahel is a French ophthalmologist and scientist. He is currently the Chair of the Department of Ophthalmology at the University of Pittsburgh School of Medicine, Director of the UPMC Vision Institute, and the Eye and Ear Foundation Chair of Ophthalmology. Sahel previously led the Vision Institute (French: Institut de la Vision) in Paris, a research center associated with one of the oldest eye hospitals of Europe, Quinze-Vingts National Eye Hospital in Paris, founded in 1260. He is a pioneer in the field of artificial retina and eye regenerative therapies. He is a member of the French Academy of Sciences.

== Biography ==
José-Alain Sahel held the chair of the Professor of Ophthalmology at the University Pierre and Marie Curie in Paris and the Professor of Biomedical Sciences (Cumberlege Chair) at University College London. He performed a research fellowship at Massachusetts Eye and Ear Infirmary, Harvard Medical School with Professor Daniel. M. Albert and a visiting scholarship at Harvard Biological Laboratories with Professor John. E. Dowling.

Sahel was appointed Professor of Ophthalmology at the University Louis Pasteur of Strasbourg in 1988. He was later appointed Chairman of the Department of Ophthalmology at the Quinze-Vingts National Ophthalmology Hospital in 2001 and led that Department till 2020. During his time at the Department, a new Department of Vitreo-Retinal Diseases at the Rothschild Ophthalmology Foundation was established, where he was Chair from 2001 to 2020. He joined Sorbonne Université (former Pierre and Marie Curie University Medical School) in 2002. He held the Cumberlege Chair of Biomedical Sciences at the Institute of Ophthalmology-University College London from 2001 to 2017.

Sahel created the Institut de la Vision (Sorbonne Université-Inserm, CNRS), and led it from its opening in 2008 until 2021. He directed a Clinical Investigation Center in Ophthalmology (2004-2021), the National Reference Center on Inherited Retinal Diseases (2006-2020), the Fondation Voir et Entendre, since 2022, the Laboratory of Excellence LIFESENSES selected and funded by the Investissements d'Avenir National Program (2011-2020), the Carnot Institute on Seeing and Hearing promoting technology transfer in sensory systems research (2006-2024), and the Institut Hospitalo-Universitaire FOReSIGHT (2019-2023). This integrative center for multidisciplinary basic, clinical, and industrial research that functions in synergy with the Quinze-Vingts National Eye Hospital and Clinical Investigation Center allowed translation of scientific discoveries to the clinic.

He holds an Honoris Causa Doctorate from the University of Geneva and is an elected member of the following organizations: the European Academy of Ophthalmology (2006), the Academia Ophthalmologia Internationalis (2007), the Academy of Sciences-Institut de France (2007), the German National Academy of Sciences Leopoldina (2014), the National Academy of Technologies of France (2015), the National Academy of Surgery of France (2020), the Association of American Physicians (2018), the American Ophthalmology Society (2021, induction in 2022), and a Fellow of the National Academy of Inventors (2024).

In October 2016, Sahel was hired by the University of Pittsburgh School of Medicine as Chair of the Department of Ophthalmology, the Director of the UPMC Vision Institute, and the Eye and Ear Foundation Chair of Ophthalmology. The UPMC Vision Institute headquarters is housed in the Mercy Pavilion and opened in May 2023. In this facility, clinicians and researchers are brought together under one roof, enabling collaboration and integration of research into patient care. In addition to being the Chair of the University of Pittsburgh Department of Ophthalmology, Sahel practices as a physician specializing in retina and vitreous disease, with a focus on inherited retinal degenerations and age-related macular degeneration.

Sahel is a member of advisory boards of both public and private institutions, including the Foundation Fighting Blindness Retinal Degeneration Fund and Advisor, and UPMC Enterprises, LightStone Ventures, the Gilbert Family Foundation, and the Institute of Molecular and Clinical Ophthalmology, Basel. He serves on editorial boards of journals such as Science Translational Medicine (2009-), Journal of Clinical Investigation, Ophthalmology and Therapy, and Progress in Retinal and Eye Research.

He was appointed in 2021 to the Conseil Stratégique des Industries de Santé and in 2023 to the Conseil de l'Ordre National du Mérite and the newly formed Conseil Présidentiel de la Science, advising Président Emmanuel Macron. In 2025, he was named as a member of the Academia Europea, the pan-European Academy of Humanities, Letters, and Sciences. He is receiving the most important award in vision research in 2026, the Proctor Medal, from ARVO.

Sahel has given over 300 guest lectures, including: The Macula Society Meeting Michaelson Lecture "Gene-Independent Strategies in Retinal Dystrophies: The Translational Pathways" (Palm Springs, CA, USA, 2024); 2024 Center for Visual Science, 33rd Symposium Keynote Lecture, "From photoreceptor neuroprotection to vision restoration : translational challenges" (Rochester, NY U.S.A., 2024); Sculpted Light in the Brain Conference "Sculpting the Future of Vision Restoration" (Paris, France, 2024); From the Eye to the Brain Nature conference "Neuroprotection of Cone Photoreceptors as a Gene-Independent therapeutic strategy in Inherited retinal diseases" (Rome, Italy, 2024); and EVER Congress - the De Laey EVER keynote lecture "Cone-directed strategies in retinal degenerations" (Valencia, Spain, 2023).

Sahel is co-inventor and co-owner of over 90 patents. He founded StreetLab (development of tools and methods for studying visual impairment and evaluation efficacy of new therapies in real-life conditions) and companies to bring novel therapies to patients, e.g., Fovea Pharmaceuticals (acquired by Sanofi in 2009), GenSight Biologics (development of genetic and optogenetic therapies), Pixium Vision (artificial retina), SparingVision, among others (Tilak Healthcare, NetraMind, Vegavect, and Avista Therapeutics).

== Research ==
José-Alain Sahel is a clinician-scientist conducting research on vision restoration focusing on cellular and molecular mechanisms underlying retinal degeneration, and development of treatments for currently untreatable retinal diseases. He has continued to work to understand and prevent vision loss from photoreceptor cell degeneration and developing vision restoration strategies. His clinical research works closely with experimental research such as information processing, genetic therapeutic research including modeling, evidence of pre-clinical concepts, and technological developments in imaging and surgery. He has conducted clinical trials on retinal conditions, gene therapy, retinal prothesis, and optogenetics.

Together with his team, Sahel works on the conception, development, and evaluation of treatments for retinal diseases, with a focus on genetic rod-cone dystrophies, including neuroprotection, stem cells, gene therapy, pharmacology, and artificial retina. He was the first to hypothesize and demonstrate that rod photoreceptors produce a protein that rescues cone photoreceptors, thereby maintaining light-adapted and high-resolution vision. Sahel's research team (with S. Mohand-Said and Thierry Léveillard) identified the underlying signal: Rod-derived Cone Viability Factor (RdCVF), and determined its mechanisms of action as associated with the stimulation of aerobic glycolysis and antioxidant.

Utilizing a variety of molecular and functional genomics approaches, Sahel's group aims to identify novel disease-causing genes for retinal degenerations. Along with the research on developmental biology, functional genomics, physiology and therapeutics, his team (with M. Paques, S. Mohand-Said and I. Audo) conducts research on genotype-phenotype correlations with high resolution in vivo non-invasive high-resolution retinal imaging techniques (optical coherence tomography and adaptive optics) aiming at refining the characterization of functional deficits, discovering of reproducible biomarkers, and identifying patients eligible for clinical application of innovative therapies.

Sahel chaired (2006-2020) the Clinical Investigation Center at the National Eye Hospital des Quinze-Vingst in Paris. One of his most valued achievements is the constitution (with Isabelle Audo and Saddek Mohand-Said) and follow-up of one of the largest cohort of patients with inherited retinal degenerative diseases. Currently, more than 9,000 patients are fully phenotyped and half of them are genotyped, allowing for better assessment of disease risk and prognosis, prediction of optimal therapy, diagnostic criteria, etc. Together with M. Fink (Institut Langevin), Sahel led a ERC-Synergy grant (2014-2021) aiming at developing novel technologies for morpho-functional imaging of the visual system.

Sahel and his team have developed regenerative therapeutic approaches to restore vision. He led (with Marisol Corral-Debrinski) a novel gene therapy for Leber Hereditary Optic Neuropathy, a blinding neurodegenerative disease. After demonstration of vision restoration in relevant models, Sahel's group and the start-up Gensight undertook clinical studies for safety and efficacy of AAV2-ND4 gene therapy, leading to the first demonstration in large-scale randomized trials of the efficacy of gene therapy in Leber Hereditary Optic Neuropathy.

With B. Roska at the Institute of Ophthalmology of Basel and S. Picaud and Deniz Dalkara at Institut de la Vision in Paris, Sahel's group demonstrated that different retinal cell types such as "dormant cones" and retinal ganglion cells can be converted into "artificial photoreceptors" by targeting the expression of genetically encoded light sensors enabling mice with retinal degeneration to perform visually guided behaviors. After this successful demonstration of visual function restoration, Sahel and his team, in partnership with Botond Roska and the start-up Gensight, conceived the first-in-man clinical trial combining a biotherapy (photoactivatable optogene channelrhodopsin expressed in retinal ganglion cells) coupled with a stimulation device and observed the first clinical evidence for vision restoration in humans using optogenetics.

After early clinical applications of the Argus II retinal prosthesis, Sahel led - alongside D. Palanker at Stanford University - the clinical development of a highly innovative wireless retinal prosthesis for photovoltaic vision restoration, currently in clinical trials in Europe and the U.S. for age-related macular degeneration.

== Awards ==
2026 ARVO Proctor Medal

The 2024 Wolf Prize in Medicine, The Wolf Foundation (with Botond Roska)

The EURORDIS 2024 Black Pearl Scientific Award

The Michaelson Award and Lecture, The Macula Society, 2024

Elected Fellow of the National Academy of Inventors, 2023

Appointed to the French Presidential Council for Science, 2023

The International Prize in Translational Neuroscience -The Reemtsma Stiftung- Max Planck Gesellschaft (with Botond Roska), 2023

Promoted to Commander in the National Order of Merit of France and appointed to the Council of The National Order of Merit, 2023

Corinne Kirchner Research Award from the American Foundation for the Blind, 2023

The Chica and Heinz Schaller Foundation Award in Translational Neuroscience (FENS), 2022

Breakthrough of the Year in the Life Sciences category-Falling Walls Foundation, Berlin, Germany, 2021

Gold Fellow ARVO, 2020

Foundation Fighting Blindness (FFB) Llura Liggett Gund Award, 2015

The Institut de France's Foundation NRJ Grand Prix scientifique, 2006

== Selected publications ==
- Sahel, JA; Roska, B (2013). "Gene therapy for blindness". Annu Rev Neurosci. 2013: 467–88. doi:10.1146/annurev-neuro-062012-170304. PMID 23724995.
- Jaillard, C; Mouret, A; Niepon, ML; Clérin, E; Yang, Y; Lee-Rivera, I; Aït-Ali, N; Millet-Puel, G; Cronin, T; Sedmak, T; Raffelsberger, W; Kinzel, B; Trembleau, A; Poch, O; Bennett, J; Wolfrum, U; Lledo, PM; Sahel, JA; Léveillard, T (May 2012). "Nxnl2 splicing results in dual functions in neuronal cell survival and maintenance of cell integrity". Hum Mol Genet. 21 (10): 2298–311. doi:10.1093/hmg/dds050. PMC 3664437. PMID 22343139.
- Vignal-Clermont, C; Audo, I; Sahel, JA; Paques, M (Oct 2010). "Poppers-associated retinal toxicity" (PDF). N Engl J Med. 363 (16): 1583–5. doi:10.1056/nejmc1005118. PMID 20942681.
- Busskamp, V; Duebel, J; Balya, D; Fradot, M; Viney, TJ; Siegert, S; Groner, AC; Cabuy, E; Forster, V; Seeliger, M; Biel, M; Humphries, P; Paques, M; Mohand-Said, S; Trono, D; Deisseroth, K; Sahel, JA; Picaud, S; Roska, B (2010). "Genetic Reactivation of Cone Photoreceptors Restores Visual Responses in Retinitis pigmentosa". Science. 329 (5990): 413–7. Bibcode:2010Sci...329..413B. doi:10.1126/science.1190897. PMID 20576849. S2CID 916291.
- Léveillard, T; Sahel, JA (Apr 2010). "Rod-derived cone viability factor for treating blinding diseases: from clinic to redox signaling". Sci. Transl. Med. 2 (26): 26. doi:10.1126/scitranslmed.3000866. PMC 2896730. PMID 20375363.
- Yang, Y; Mohand-Said, S; Danan, A; Simonutti, M; Fontaine, V; Clerin, E; Picaud, S; Léveillard, T; Sahel, JA (May 2009). "Functional cone rescue by RdCVF protein in a dominant model of retinitis pigmentosa". Mol. Ther. 17 (5): 787–95. doi:10.1038/mt.2009.28. PMC 2835133. PMID 19277021.
- Léveillard, T; Mohand-Saïd, S; Lorentz, O; Hicks, D; Fintz, AC; Clérin, E; Simonutti, M; Forster, V; Cavusoglu, N; Chalmel, F; Dollé, P; Poch, O; Lambrou, G; Sahel, JA (Jul 2004). "Identification and characterization of rod-derived cone viability factor". Nat Genet. 36 (7): 755–9. doi:10.1038/ng1386. PMID 15220920.
- Mohand-Said, S; Hicks, D; Dreyfus, H; Sahel, JA (Jun 2000). "Selective transplantation of rods delays cone loss in a retinitis pigmentosa model". Arch Ophthalmol. 118 (6): 807–11. doi:10.1001/archopht.118.6.807. PMID 10865319.
- Frasson, M; Sahel, JA; Fabre, M; Simonutti, M; Dreyfus, H; Picaud, S (Oct 1999). "Retinitis pigmentosa: rod photoreceptor rescue by a calcium-channel blocker in the rd mouse". Nat Med. 5 (10): 1183–7. doi:10.1038/13508. PMID 10502823. S2CID 8345111.
- Mohand-Said, S; Deudon-Combe, A; Hicks, D; Simonutti, M; Forster, V; Fintz, AC; Léveillard, T; Dreyfus, H; Sahel, JA (Jul 1998). "Normal retina releases a diffusible factor stimulating cone survival in the retinal degeneration mouse". Proc Natl Acad Sci U S A. 95 (14): 8357–62. Bibcode:1998PNAS...95.8357M. doi:10.1073/pnas.95.14.8357. PMC 20980. PMID 9653191.
- Delyfer, Marie-Noëlle; Raffelsberger, Wolfgang; Mercier, David; Korobelnik, Jean-François; Gaudric, Alain; Charteris, David G.; Tadayoni, Ramin; Metge, Florence; Caputo, Georges; Barale, Pierre-Olivier; Ripp, Raymond; Muller, Jean-Denis; Poch, Olivier; Sahel, José-Alain; Léveillard, Thierry (2011). "Transcriptomic Analysis of Human Retinal Detachment Reveals Both Inflammatory Response and Photoreceptor Death". PLOS ONE. 6 (12) e28791. Bibcode:2011PLoSO...628791D. doi:10.1371/journal.pone.0028791. PMC 3235162. PMID 22174898.
- Sahel, JA., Boulanger-Scemama, E., Pagot, C. et al.: Partial recovery of visual function in a blind patient after optogenetic therapy. Nat Med 27, 1223–1229 (2021). https://doi.org/10.1038/s41591-021-01351-4.
