= Stephen Manuck =

American psychologist

- Born: Stephen Bennett Manuck; December 3, 1948 (age 77); San Francisco, California
- Education: University of California Davis; Vanderbilt University
- Awards: Outstanding Contributions to Health Psychology Award from the American Psychological Association (1999)
- Scientific career
- Fields: Psychology
- Institutions: University of Virginia; Bowman Gray School of Medicine; University of Pittsburgh
- Thesis: The voluntary control of heart rate under differential somatic restraint (1974)

Stephen Bennett Manuck (born December 3, 1948) is an American psychologist who is Distinguished Professor in the Department of Psychology at the University of Pittsburgh.
