= Clifford E. Brubaker =

American medical researcher (born 1938)

- Born: December 23, 1938 (age 87); Muncie, Indiana, U.S.
- Education: University of Oregon
- Occupation: Engineering

Clifford E. Brubaker (born December 23, 1938) is Dean of the School of Health and Rehabilitation Sciences at the University of Pittsburgh. Brubaker is also a professor at that institution and an adjunct professor at both Xian Jiaotong University and Carnegie Mellon University.

== Education and career ==
Clifford E. Brubaker was born on December 23, 1938, in Muncie, Indiana. Brubaker received his Ph.D. degree in Exercise Physiology from the University of Oregon in 1968. Subsequently, in 1971, he became a professor at the University of Virginia, eventually directing its Rehabilitation Engineering Research Center on Wheelchair Mobility. In July 1991, he became Dean of the University of Pittsburgh's School of Health and Rehabilitation Sciences, where he founded the Department of Rehabilitation Science and Technology. In 1997, he led the school to develop the first multidisciplinary doctoral program in rehabilitation sciences in the United States. In 2002, Brubaker received a Lifetime Achievement "Health Care Hero Award".

== Awards and fellowships ==
- Rehabilitation Engineering and Assistive Technology Society of North America (RESNA) Distinguished Service Award - June, 1988.
- PVA Distinguished Lecturer, Seattle Veterans Administration Medical Center, March, 1989.
- Sigma Xi. (full member) 1989.
- RESNA Distinguished Service Award, June, 1990.
- Elected Fellow (founding), American Institute for Medical and Biological Engineering, February, 1992.
- Elected Fellow, RESNA, 1992.
- Elected Fellow, BMES, 2005.
- Elected President-elect of RESNA, June, 1992. (President 1995, 1996)
- Isabelle and Leonard H. Goldensen Technology Award, 1995 (United Cerebral Palsy Research and Education Foundation).
- Robin Gray Fellowship, University of Western Australia, September, 1996.
- Lifetime Achievement Award, The Pittsburgh Business Times 2002 Health Care Hero Award, March, 2002.
- Riland Memorial Lecture, American Osteopathic College of Occupational & Preventive Medicine, April, 2003.
- The Joe Award (Pittsburgh Employment Conference), August, 2004.

== Selected publications ==
- DM Brienza and CE Brubaker, (1999) "A Steering Linkage for Short Wheelbase Vehicles," Journal of Rehabilitation Research and Development, 36(1)
- Brienza, DM, RA Cooper, CE Brubaker, (1996) "Wheelchairs and Seating," Current Opinion in Orthopedics, 7 (VI)
- Brienza, DM, TE Karg, CE Brubaker (1996) "Seat Cushion Design for Elderly Wheelchair Users Based on Minimization of Soft Tissue deformation using stiffness and pressure measurements" IEEE Trans on Rehab. Eng 4(4):320–328.
- Brienza, DM, KC Chung, CE Brubaker, J Wang, TE Karg, CT Lin, (1996) "A System for the Analysis of Seat Support Surfaces Using Surface Shape Control and Simultaneous Measurement of Applied Pressures," IEEE Trans on Rehab Eng 4(2):103–113.
- Cooper, RA, DM Brienza, CE Brubaker (1994) "Wheelchairs and Seating," Current Opinion in Orthopedics, 4;VI:101-107.

== Sources ==
- Biography at SHRS
- Biography at McGowan Institute for Regenerative Medicine
