= Robert Donnorummo =

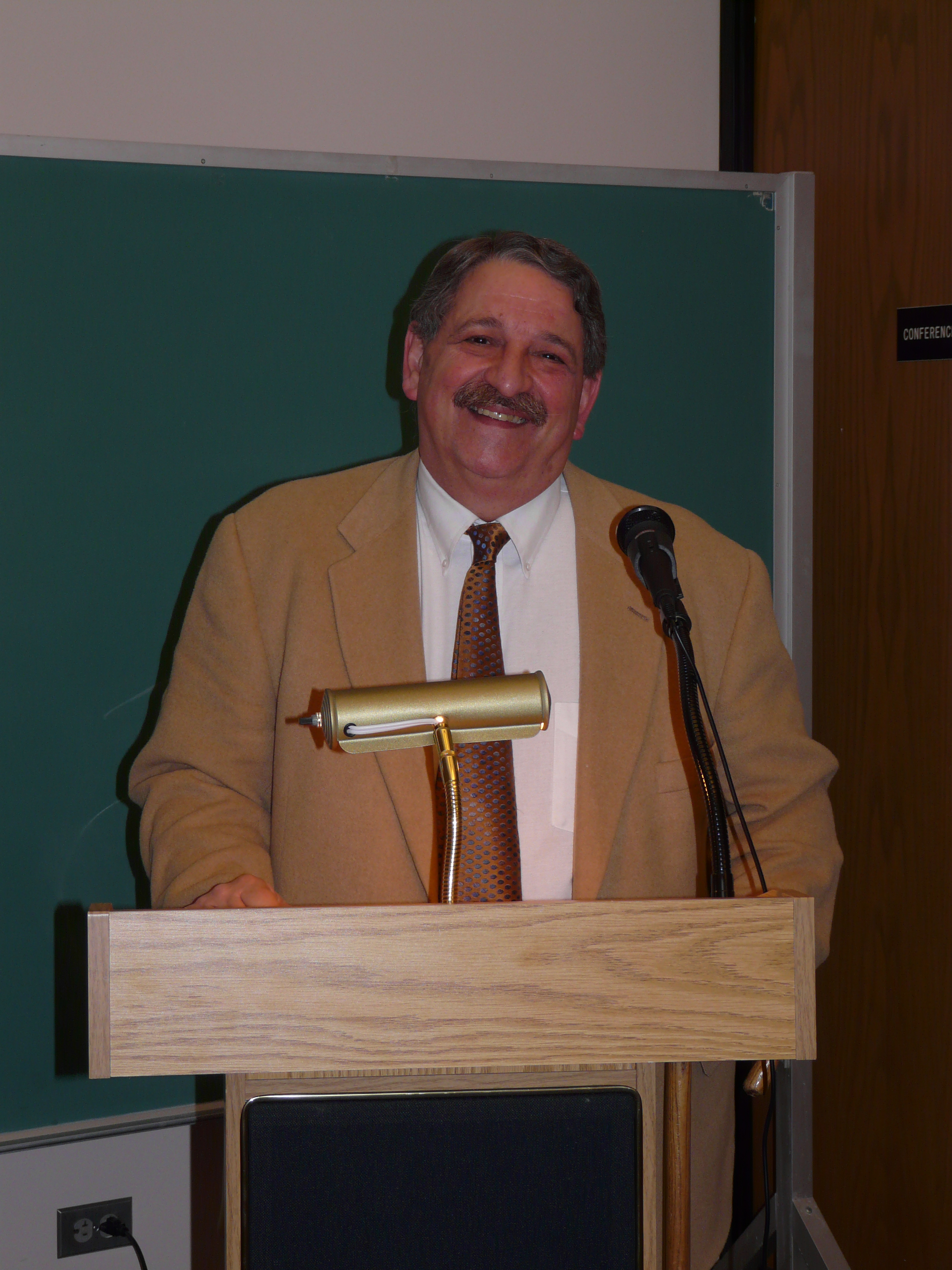
Robert Donnorummo in December 2008

Robert "Bob" Donnorummo is the Senior Research Associate and Associate Director of the Center for Russian and East European Studies at the Center for International Studies at the University of Pittsburgh. His specialization is in Russian and Polish history, transitions, and nationalism. His recent publications have focused on the political and economic changes in Eastern Europe and the former Soviet Union.
