= Vision Institute =

Scientific research center in Paris, France

Vision Institute (Institut de la Vision)
- Founder: Jose-Alain Sahel
- Established: 2008
- Focus: Eye diseases
- President: Jose-Alain Sahel
- Address: 17 rue Moreau 75012 Paris
- Location: Paris, France
- Website: http://www.institut-vision.org/

The Vision Institute (French: Institut de la Vision) is a research center in the Quinze-Vingts National Eye Hospital in Paris, France. It is one of several such centers (Inserm / UPMC / CNRS) in Europe on eye diseases.

The Institute's goal is to discover, develop and test treatments and technological innovations in the area ophthalmology and to improve the autonomy and the quality of life of patients.

== Basic research ==
Vision Institute employs more than 250 scientists (Inserm - UPMC - CNRS) specialized in vision disorders.

There are 4 research departments:

- Developmental biology: analysis of the development of the visual system, connections, stems cells and regenerative approaches
- Visual information data processing: understanding and evaluation of the visual information data processing by the retina and the brain, neurotransmission pharmaco-toxicology
- Genetics: understanding of the genetic mechanisms associated with ophthalmological disorders, identification of the genes and proteins providing protection against neuronal stress
- Therapeutics: conception and evaluation of innovative treatments - cell therapy for cornea, pharmaco-toxicology of the ocular surface and glaucoma, gene therapy for neuropathies, modeling of retinal degeneration and vascular disorders

=== Research areas ===
- Macular degeneration
- Diabetic retinopathy
- Glaucoma
- Leber's hereditary optic neuropathy
- Retinal vein occlusion
- Retinitis pigmentosa
- Usher syndrome
- Eye implants
- Gene and cell therapies
- High-resolution retinal imagery
- Innovative technologies dedicated to visually impaired

== Clinical research ==
The Ophthalmological Clinical Investigation Centre of the Quinze-Vingts National Eye Hospital opened in 2004.

The Clinical Investigation Centre covers all eye diseases but is specialised in exploration of retinal pathologies (macular degeneration, hereditary retinal degenerations, diabetic retinopathies, retinal vascular pathologies) and technological innovations.

== Research in the quality of life ==
The Vision Institute runs a StreetLab Platform Project. The StreetLab platform enables researchers to design and develop innovative technology solutions for the visually impaired while being able to evaluate the therapeutic benefit of this research directly with the people involved.

== Foundation Voir et Entendre ==
The Foundation Voir et Entendre was created in May 2007 by Prof. Christine Petit (Institut Pasteur, Collège de France) and Prof. José-Alain Sahel.

The Foundation's objective is to coordinate and to finance research programs on ocular and auditory diseases. Its mission is to stimulate the collaboration between fundamental, clinical and industrial research, so as to accelerate therapeutic innovation for the benefit of the patients.

== Industrial collaborations ==
Five major companies have settled in the Institute to develop research projects in the field of vision: Essilor, Sanofi Fovea, Thea, Horus Pharma and Iris Pharma.
