= Fabrizio Brienza =

Italian model, actor (born 1969)

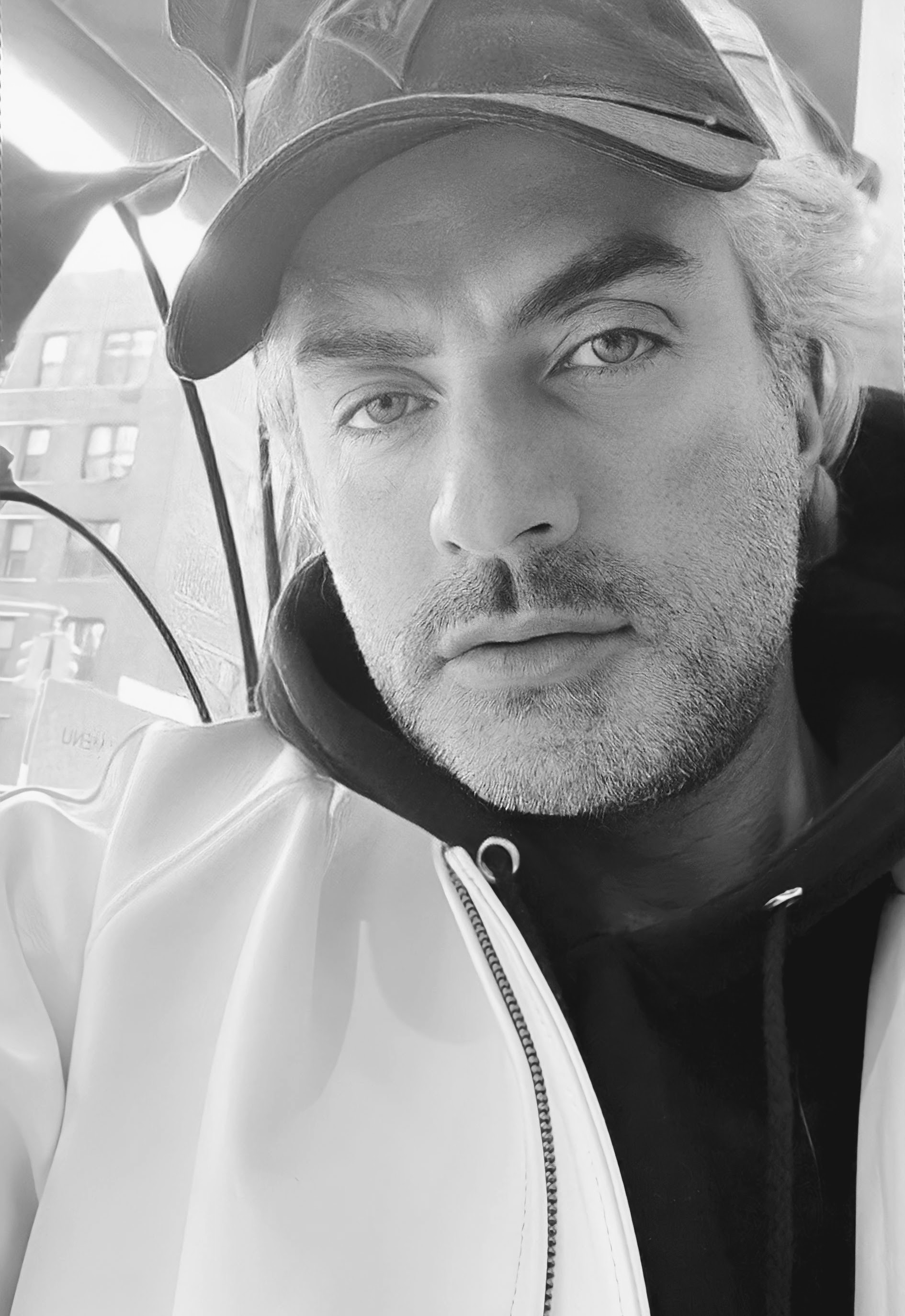
- Born: Fabrizio Brienza; 19 September 1969 (age 57); Campobasso, Italy
- Modeling information
- Height: 6 ft 3 in (1.91 m)
- Hair color: Salt/Pepper
- Eye color: Hazel

Fabrizio Brienza (born September 19, 1969) is an Italian model and actor based in New York City, United States.

== Biography ==
Brienza was born and raised in Campobasso, Italy and completed a degree in graphic design at Cappiello Accademia d'Arte e Comunicazione in Florence, Italy, before launching a modeling career in Milan. Brienza moved briefly to New York City before living for several years in Miami where he became more involved in the nightlife industry while pursuing a career in acting.

In addition to modeling for print advertisements, Brienza has modeled for numerous high-end Italian fashion houses such as Armani, Dolce & Gabbana, Ferré, Valentino, and Versace.

Brienza currently works as the doorman for notorious New York City nightclub Paul's Casablanca.

== Filmography ==
Year	Film	Role	Ref.
2023	Always Tomorrow (short)	Fabrizio	
2022	Corpse Control	Fabrizio	
2020	Cracked (short)	Attorney	
2018	Set It Up	Fancy Host	
2017	Blindspot	Thug	
2017	Middleground	Partygoer #1	
2017	Dating My Mother	Italian Stallion	
2017	The Boy Downstairs	Waiter	
2016	Younger (short)	waiter	
2015	Till Human Voices Wake Us (short)	Himself	
2014	A Walk Among the Tombstones	Thug	
2014	The Cobbler	Webb	
2014	Grand Street	Maitre D'	
2013	21st Century	Dr. Malus	
2011	The Adjustment Bureau	Miller	
2009	Duplicity	Hotel Manager	
2007	The Doorman	Himself	
2007	South Beach Undercover	Detective Brienza	
2000	For Love or Country: The Arturo Sandoval Story	Secret Agent	
1998	The Versace Murder	Model and Friend	

== Television ==
Year	Show	Role	Network	Notes
2024	Godfather of Harlem	Nico	MGM+	
2022	Evil	Father Damian		
2022	Billions	Commission Member		
2022	Inventing Anna	Sommelier		
2021	The Blacklist	Waiter		
2020	Power	Second Guard		
2012	Days of Our Lives	Santo DiMera	NBC	
2011	Law and Order: SVU	Joel	NBC	
??	The Sopranos	??	HBO	Guest Spot
??	30 Rock	??	NBC	Feature
??	On the Road	??	Italia1	Guest Spot
??	Get Packin'	??	Travel Channel	Host/Regular
??	Blind Date	??	UPN	Guest Spot
??	Occhio Di Falco	??	RAI	Recurring Role
??	Drive In	??	Italia1	Recurring Role
??	La Sai' L' Ultima	??	Italia1	Recurring Role
2002	Hotel Erotica	Marco	??	
