= Journal of Telemedicine and Telecare =

- Discipline: Telemedicine & E-health
- Language: English

Publication details
- History: 1995–present
- Publisher: SAGE Publishing
- Frequency: 10/year
- Impact factor: 6.344 (2021)

Standard abbreviations
- ISO 4: J. Telemed. Telecare

Indexing
- ISSN: 1357-633X
- OCLC no.: 33812452

Links
- Journal homepage

The Journal of Telemedicine and Telecare is a peer-reviewed journal covering the field of telemedicine and e-health. The journal is a member of the Committee on Publication Ethics (COPE). The journal's Editor in Chief is Anthony Smith (University of Queensland, Australia). It has been in publication since 1995 and is published by SAGE Publishing.

== Abstracting and indexing ==
The journal is abstracted and indexed in:

- Academic Search
- Current Contents
- EBSCO
- EBSCOhost
- EMBASE
- GeoRef
- MEDLINE
- ProQuest
- PsycINFO
- Public Affairs Index
- PubMed/MEDLINE
- Science Citation Index Expanded
- Scopus
