= Thomas Detre =

American psychiatrist (1924–2010)

Thomas P. Detre, M.D. (17 May 1924 – 9 October 2010) was a psychiatrist, academic, and senior administrator at the University of Pittsburgh, eulogized as the "visionary" leader most responsible for the transformation the university's teaching hospitals into the currently construed University of Pittsburgh Medical Center (UPMC) and elevating the stature of the university's six schools of health sciences through increased emphasis on research.

== Early life ==
Born "Tamás Feldmeier" to a Hungarian-Jewish family in Budapest, he decided at the age of 14 to become a psychiatrist, and avidly read the works of Sigmund Freud and other medical authors as an adolescent. In 1942, he earned his bachelor's degree in classical languages from the Gymnasium of the Piarist Fathers in Kecskemét, where his father was a widely respected physician.

Having heard eyewitness accounts in Budapest of Nazi atrocities in the East, Tamás warned his parents they would not be safe in Kecskemét after the arrival of the Germans; his father was convinced the community itself, where he had delivered more than 4,000 babies, would permit him no harm. Taking some family jewelry to sell, Tamás fled on his own to Budapest before the Germans arrived in March 1944; after living hand-to-mouth for many months and narrowly avoiding deportation himself, he would discover as a 20-year-old student that his parents and twenty members of his extended family (virtually everyone to whom he was related) had been murdered in Auschwitz. The following year, Tamás formally changed his surname to Detre, a name variably pronounced as DEBT-tree, DEE-tree, or de-TRAY by people who later worked with and knew him. (Although some of Detre's friends believed the name was inspired by the French verb être, "to be", and several obituaries reported this as fact, Detre himself never explained his name's origins.)

While completing his medical studies in Rome in the early 1950s, Detre counseled a small American expatriate clientele which included the writer Claude Fredericks and his 25-year-old friend, the poet James Merrill, who sought Detre's help for writer's block. In his 1993 memoir, A Different Person, Merrill wrote of the lifelong recurring dividend from his early, formal, and painstaking psychoanalysis in Rome with "Dr. Detre", with whom he kept daily appointments throughout 1951-1952 (with Detre saying little or nothing in most sessions).

After Detre obtained a U.S. visa in 1953, the poet and physician would reunite in New York and see their friendship expand to include Detre's wife Katherine (herself a renowned epidemiologist). The couple moved to Connecticut in 1957 after Detre was hired by Yale University, and successfully transplanted their loyalties to Pittsburgh in 1973 (a city in which Merrill was hospitalized several times in 1993-1994 for AIDS complications, his spirits lifted by Detre's promise: "Katherine and I will see you through").

== Career ==
Between 1957 and 1973, Detre established at Yale School of Medicine a new model of psychiatric care which dramatically reduced hospitalization lengths, and which in its broadly integrative approach ultimately brought psychiatry much closer to other domains of medicine. With co-author Henry Jarecki, Detre would write a 733-page overview of Modern Psychiatric Treatment, an extended meditation on the value (and perceived deficiencies) in the state-of-the-art psychopharmacology of the era. The book was published by J. B. Lippincott in 1971.

In 1973, Detre gave up tenure at Yale to lead the Western Psychiatric Institute and Clinic and become Chair of the Department of Psychiatry at the University of Pittsburgh. (Although a Yale colleague warned him that "planes fly over Pittsburgh, they do not land there," Detre drolly and presciently suggested that "they will land when we land.") In time, Detre attracted more than 30 Yale faculty to Pittsburgh, where he developed a reputation for political skill, compassion, persistence, and diplomatic charm, virtues which helped lead the University of Pittsburgh School of Medicine to higher achievements in research, teaching, and patient treatment. Named Vice Chancellor of Health Sciences at the University of Pittsburgh in 1984, Detre oversaw an institution consistently ranked among the nation's top ten in research funding.

Following Katherine Detre's death in January 2006 (after 49 years of marriage), Detre courted and married Ellen Ormond. In addition, Detre was survived by two adult sons and four grandchildren.

== Books ==
- Clinical Psychiatry: Psychotherapy Topics Volume 1; Thomas P. Detre, Saeed Shamloo, Hamideh Jahangiri; ISBN 978-613-8-93032-7 (Scholars' Press)
- Clinical Psychiatry: Psychotherapy Topics Volume 2; Thomas P. Detre, Saeed Shamloo, Hamideh Jahangiri; ISBN 978-613-8-93041-9 (Scholars' Press)
- Handbook of Psychiatry (30 Volumes) Volume 23; Javad Nurbakhsh, Thomas P. Detre, Hamideh Jahangiri; ISBN 978-613-9-81879-2 (Lap Lambert Academic Publishing)
