= American Telemedicine Association =

American non-profit organization

- Formation: 1993; 33 years ago
- Tax ID no.: 74-2676503
- Legal status: 501(c)(3) nonprofit organization
- Headquarters: 901 North Glebe Road, Suite 850, Arlington County, Virginia, U.S.
- Coordinates: 38.881767°N 77.115457°W
- Region served: U.S.
- President: Andrew Watson
- Chief Executive Officer: Ann Mond Johnson
- Revenue: $5,238,325 (2016)
- Expenses: $5,119,631 (2016)
- Employees: 8 (2016)
- Volunteers: 68 (2016)
- Website: www.americantelemed.org

The American Telemedicine Association (ATA), established in 1993, is a non-profit organization whose goal is to promote access to medical care for consumers and health professionals via telecommunications technology (alternatively referred to as telemedicine, telehealth or eHealth). Membership in the American Telemedicine Association is open to individuals, companies, and other healthcare and technology organizations.

== Mission and objectives ==
The ATA is a resource and advocate for promoting access to medical care for consumers and health professionals via telecommunications technology. It seeks to bring together diverse groups from traditional medicine, academic medical centers, technology and telecommunications companies, e-health, medical societies, local governments, and others to overcome barriers to the advancement of telemedicine through the professional, ethical, and equitable improvement in health care delivery. The ATA is governed by a board of directors elected by through its membership.

== Activities ==
The ATA implements its objectives by:

- Educating the government about telemedicine as being an essential component in the delivery of modern medical care.
- Serving as a clearinghouse for telemedicine information and services.
- Fostering networking and collaboration among interests in medicine and technology.
- Promoting research and education, including the sponsorship of scientific educational meetings and the Telemedicine and e-Health Journal.
- Spearheading the development of appropriate clinical and industry policies and standards.

== Services ==
The ATA provides a range of services for its members and the industry as a whole.

- ATA Annual Meeting – the world's largest scientific meeting and exposition focusing exclusively on telemedicine, with hundreds of presentations, posters and workshops.
- Online Member News Updates – news briefs via email about the latest event and activities affecting telemedicine professionals.
- ATA Website – a resource for telemedicine news and information.
- ATA Online Membership Directory – the source of who's who in telemedicine.
- Telemedicine and e-Health – a peer-reviewed publication on clinical telemedicine practice; technical advances and enabling technologies; continuing medical education; and the impact of telemedicine on the quality, cost-effectiveness, and access to health care. During the coronavirus pandemic, ATA CEO, Ann Mond Johnson said that telemedicine would help lessen the exposure to the virus.
- Special Interest Groups, Regional Chapters, and Discussion Groups – allow members to address issues related to the advancement and application of telemedicine in specific areas including home telehealth, ocular telehealth, technology, teledermatology, telemental health, telenursing, telepathology, and telerehabilitation.

== See also ==
- EHealth
- General Maxwell R. Thurman Award
- List of video telecommunication services and product brands
- MHealth
- Telehealth
- Telemedicine
- Telerehabilitation
