= University of Pittsburgh School of Health and Rehabilitation Sciences =

Pennsylvania school

Coordinates: 40.4389°N 79.9620°W

- Type: Public
- Established: 1969
- Dean: Anthony Delitto
- Faculty: 213
- Undergraduates: 574
- Postgraduates: 787
- Location: Pittsburgh, Pennsylvania, US
- Campus: Oakland (Main)

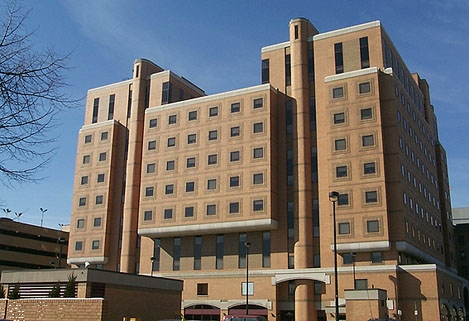
Forbes Tower, one of several buildings on Pitt Campus related to the School

The University of Pittsburgh School of Health and Rehabilitation Sciences (or SHRS) is located in Pittsburgh, Pennsylvania.

== History ==
The school was founded in 1969 as the School of Health Related Professions. By 1971, the school had 23 full-time faculty members and had graduated 31 students with bachelor's degrees, 10 with master's degrees and 18 with post-baccalaureate certificates. Focused from its creation on entry-level professional education, the school began to focus more on research and advanced graduate school after 1989, under the guidance of then senior vice chancellor for health sciences Thomas Detre. The name of the school was changed in 1991 after Clifford E. Brubaker became Dean, at which time it was expanded with new programs and departments. In 2009-2010, the faculty had grown to over 100, with over 1,100 enrolled students.

== Academics ==
SHRS offers undergraduate programs in: Athletic Training, Communication Science, Emergency Medicine, Health Information Management, Nutrition Science, and Rehabilitation Science. Graduate programs include: Audiology (AuD)/Speech-Language Pathology (MA/MS, CScD), Communication Science & Disorders (PhD), Health Informatics (MS), Nutrition & Dietetics (MS), Occupational Therapy (OTD, MS), Physical Therapy (DPT, MS), Physician Assistant Studies (MS), Prosthetics & Orthotics (MS), Clinical Rehabilitation and Mental Health Counseling (MS), Rehabilitation Technology (MRT), Rehabilitation Science (PhD), Sports Medicine (MS), and Sports Science (MS).

== Research ==
SHRS faculty and students are active in basic, translational and clinical research. In 2017, SHRS budgets exceeded $21 million in external research funding. Areas of inquiry include: the measurement and study of motion; balance disorders; human performance; hearing disorders; speech, language and cognitive disorders; neuropsychological parameters; telerehabilitation; wheelchair performance and design; and data mining. SHRS research typically involves faculty from multiple departments, schools, as well as other institutions.

Clinical collaborations include several programs of the University of Pittsburgh Medical Center (e.g., Center for Assistive Technology, Institute for Rehabilitation and Research, Centers for Rehabilitation Services, Center for Sports Medicine, Comprehensive Spine Center, Facial Nerve Center).

== See also ==
- University of Pittsburgh Medical Center
- University of Pittsburgh School of Medicine
