= Sling (furniture) =

Suspended furniture item

Sling furniture is usually a suspended, free-swinging chair, bed, or hammock that is made of a framework connected to hanging straps or rope. When attached to poles or a frame for carrying, a sling becomes a stretcher, a simple form of litter.

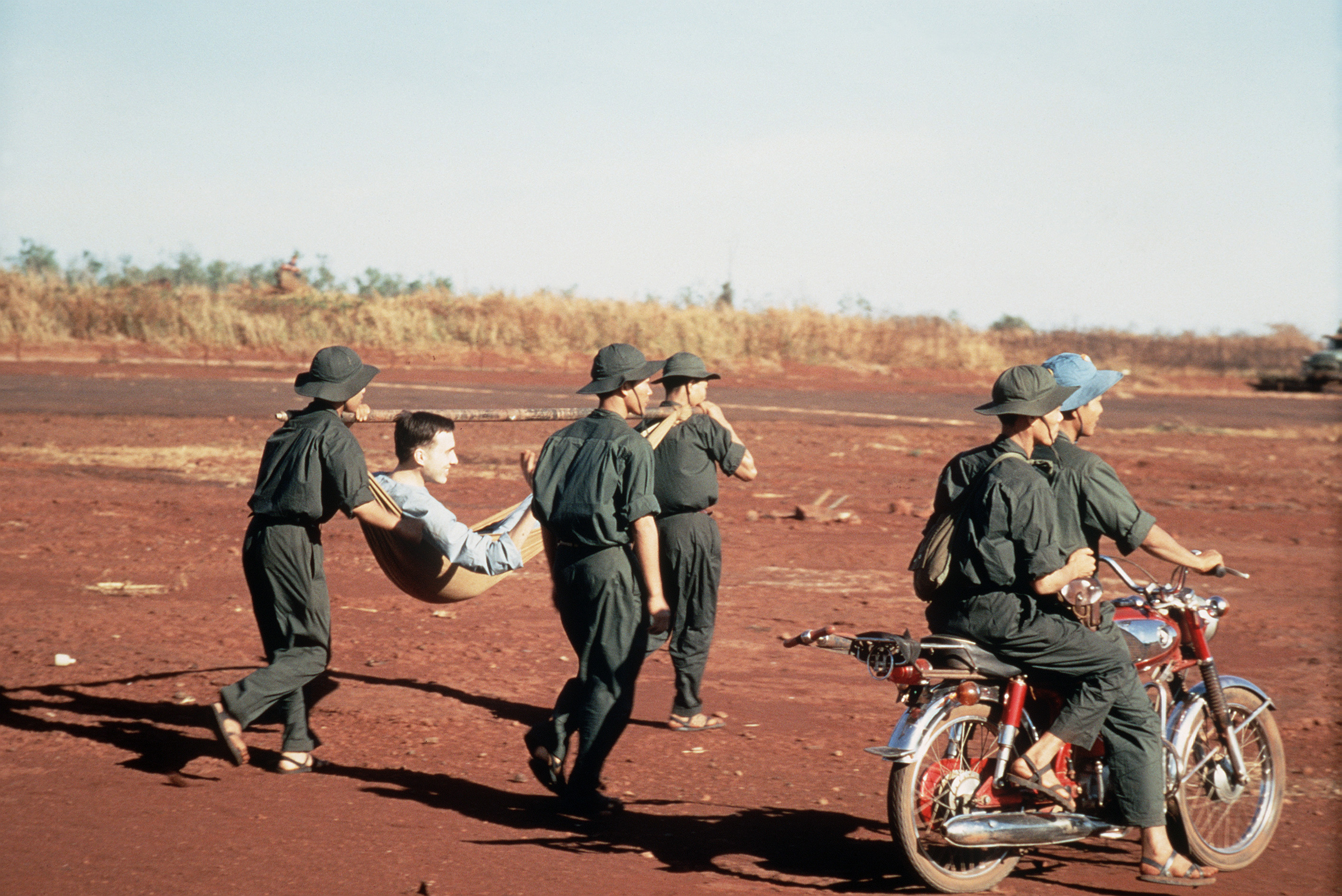
A sling being used to carry an injured man

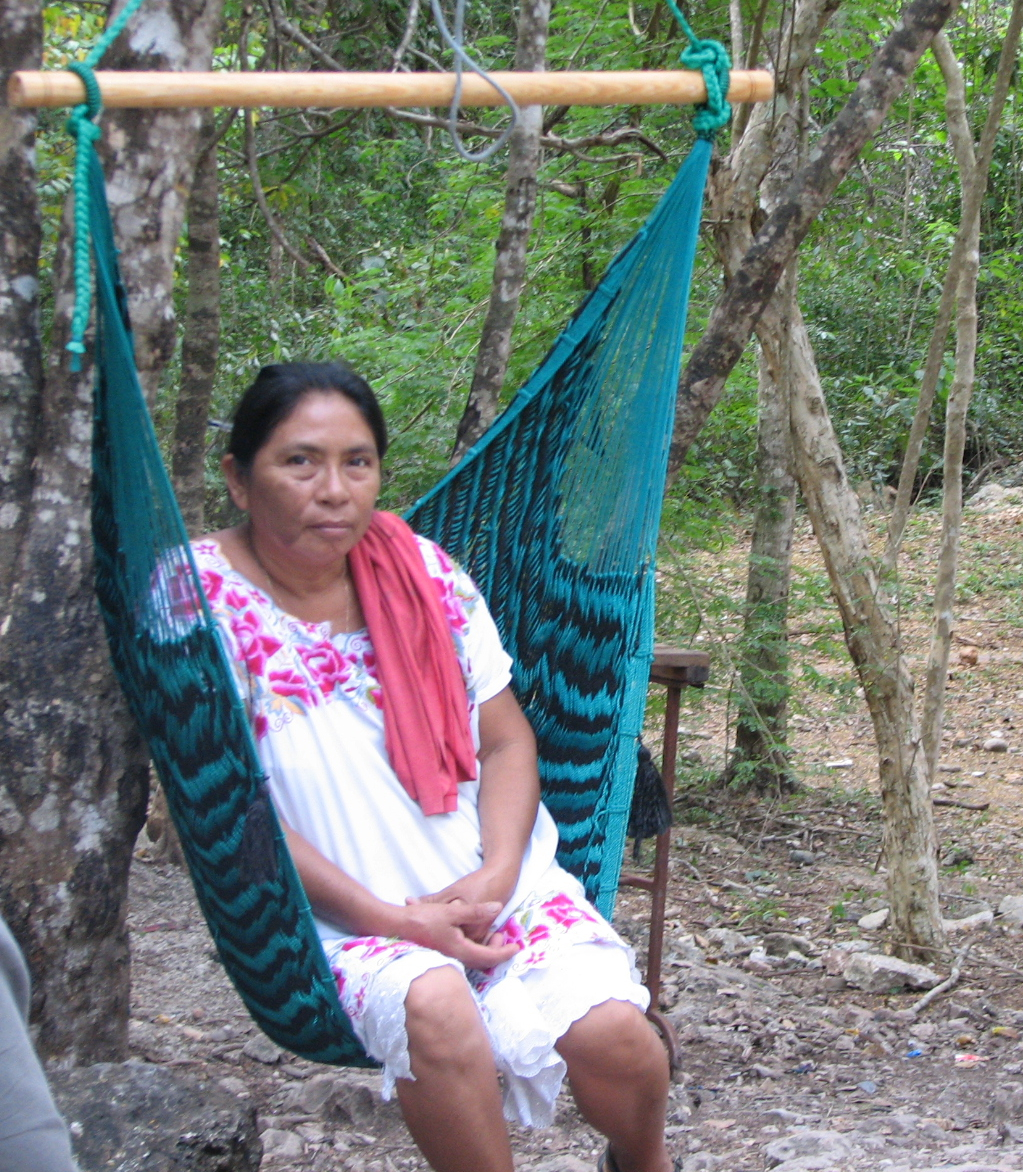
Hanging chair in Yucatán, 2007

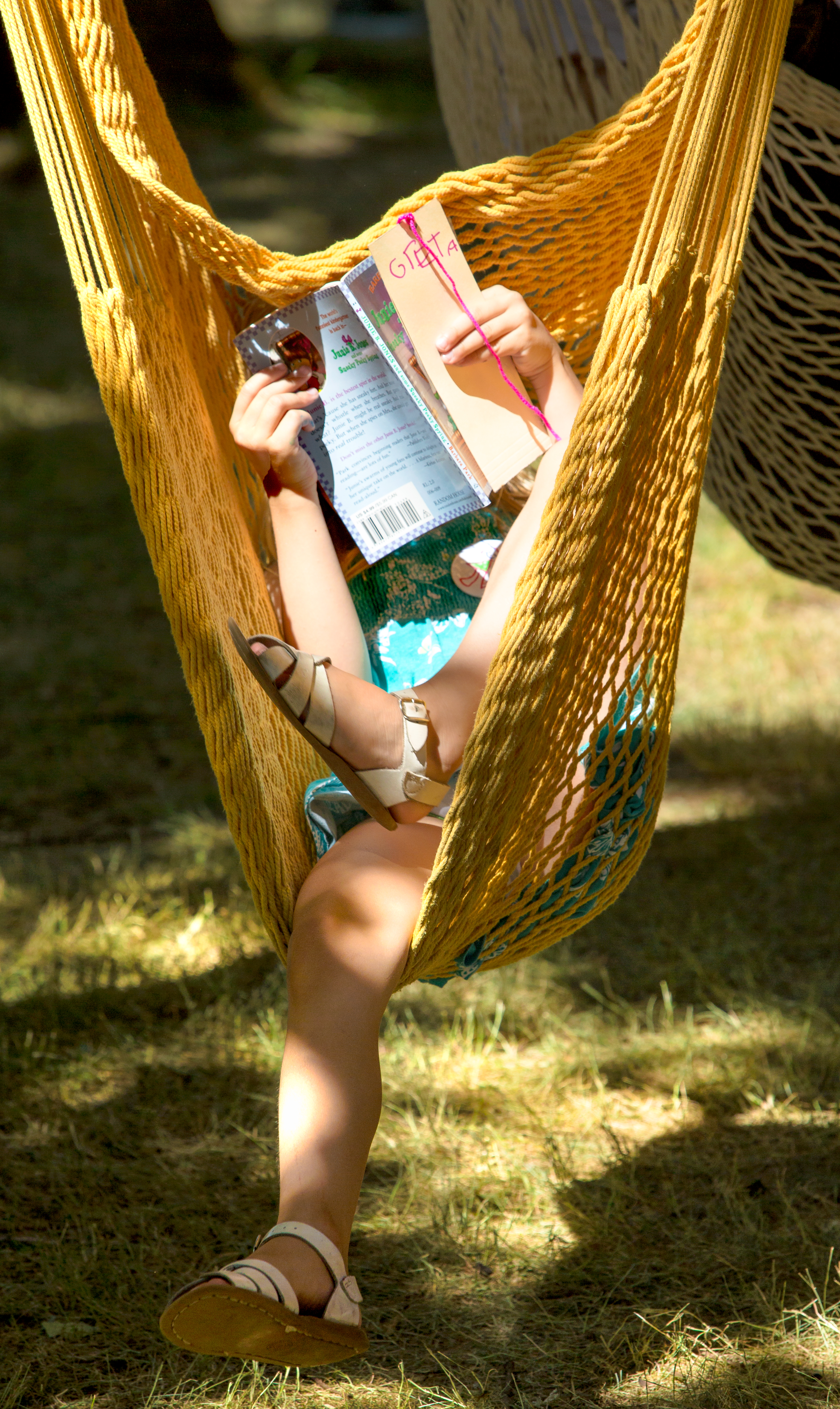
Hammock chair, Salem, Oregon, US, 2014

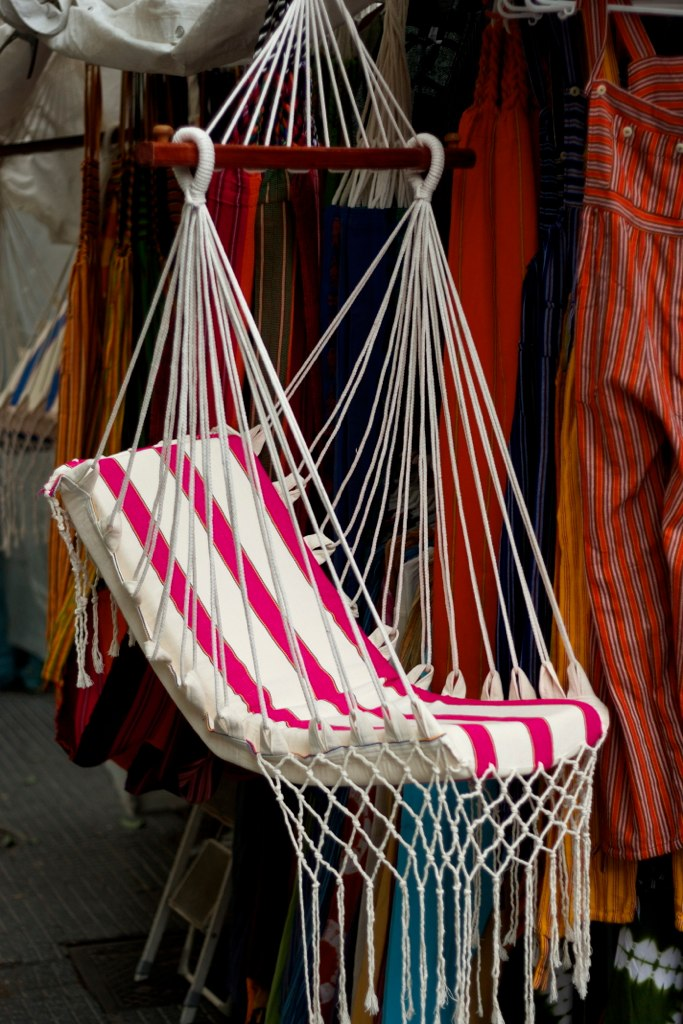
An upholstered hanging chair, Spain, 2012

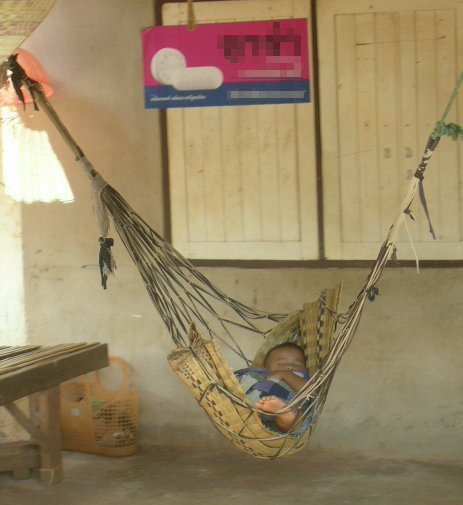
Baby asleep in a hammock, Na Khun Yai, Nakhon Phanom province, Thailand, 2004

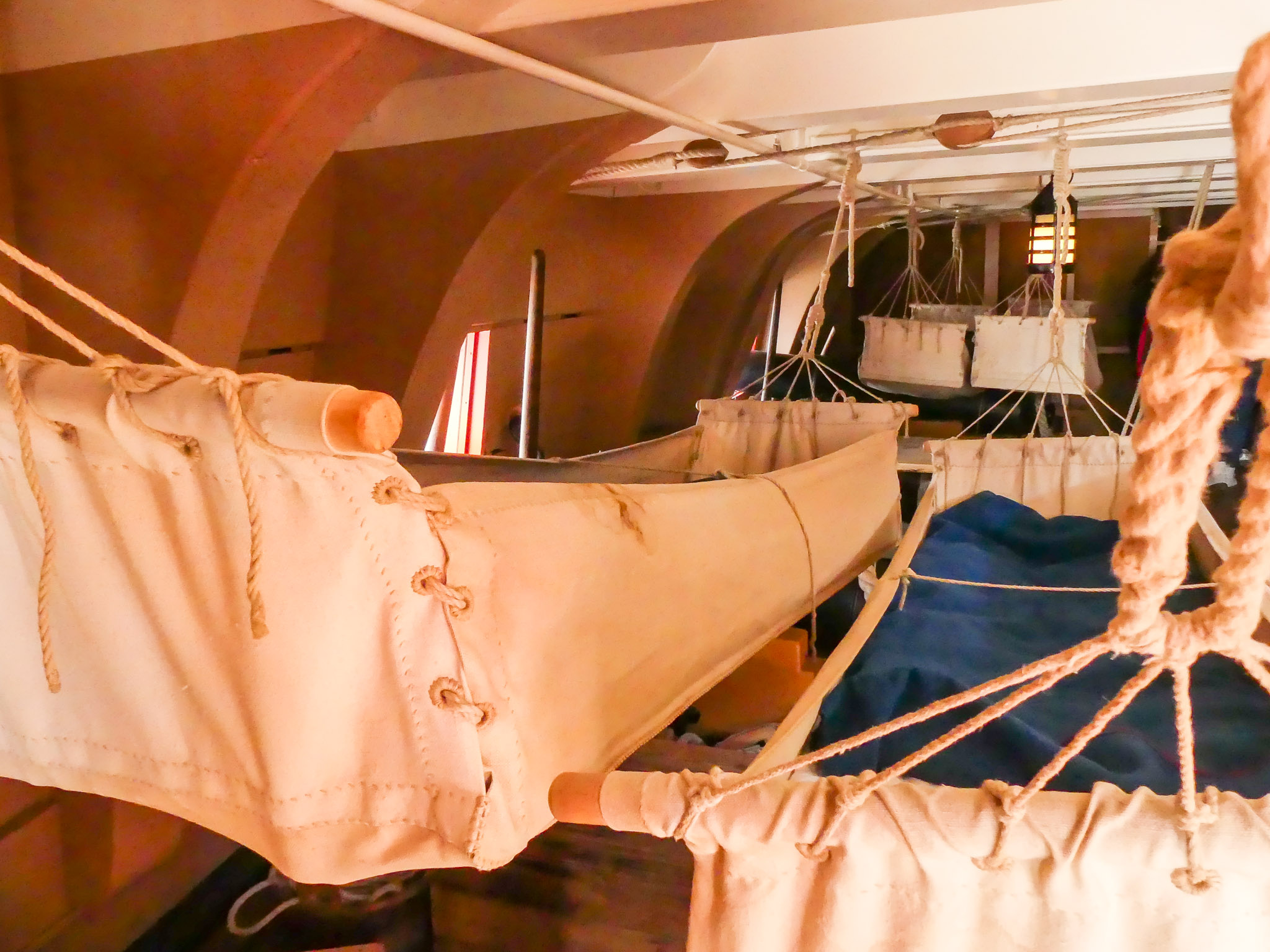
British naval hammocks, 1700–1800s. HMS Victory reconstruction

== See also ==
- Sex swing
- Swing (seat)
