= List of University of Pittsburgh alumni =

This list of University of Pittsburgh alumni includes notable graduates, non-graduate former students, and current students of the University of Pittsburgh, a state-related research university in Pittsburgh, Pennsylvania.

== Arts and entertainment ==
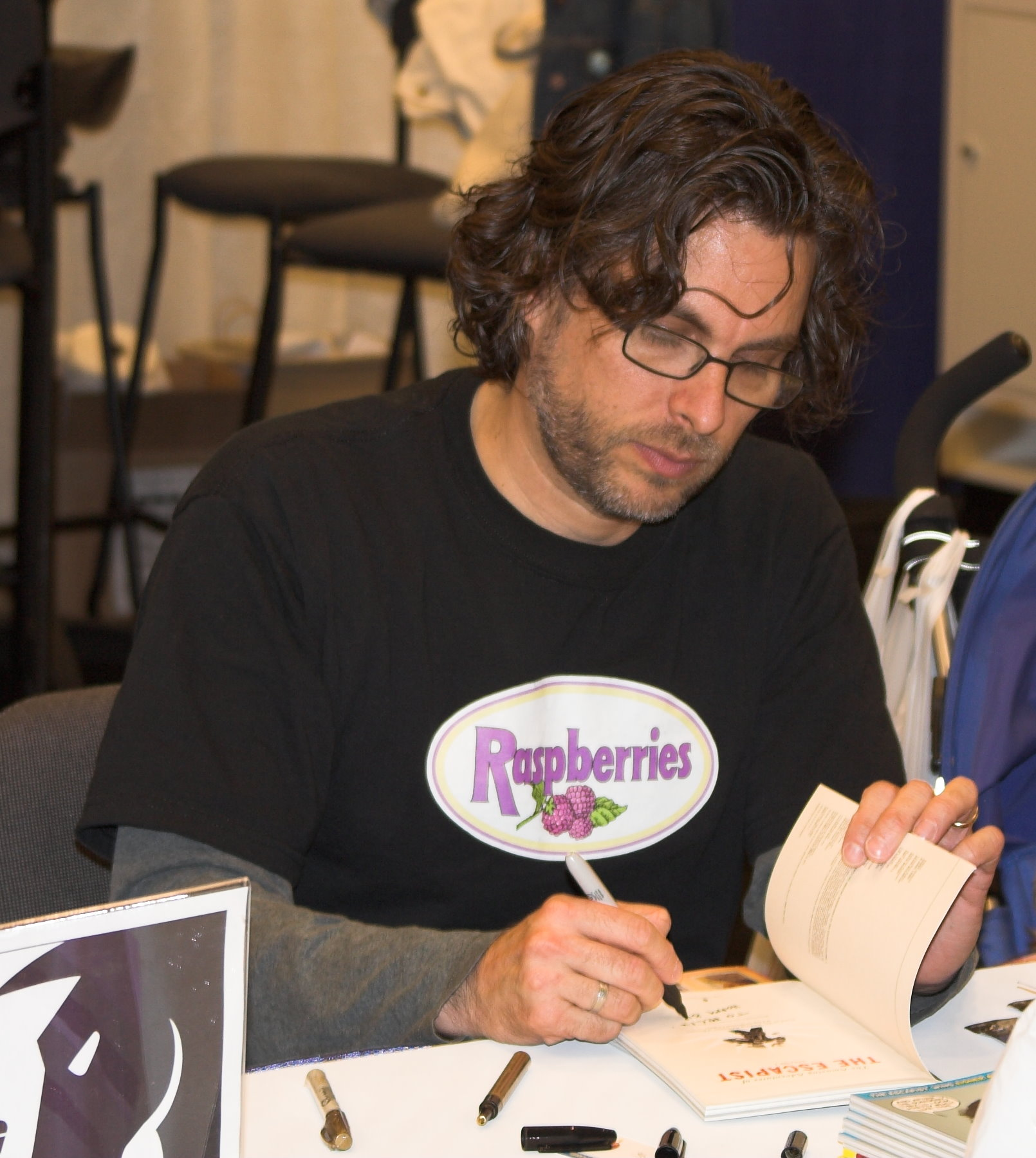
Michael Chabon, Pulitzer Prize-winning author of The Amazing Adventures of Kavalier & Clay, Wonder Boys, and The Mysteries of Pittsburgh

- Dilruba Ahmed – Bangladeshi poet and author
- Geri Allen (A&S 1983G, faculty) – jazz composer, educator, and pianist
- Hervey Allen (1915) – author, best known for Anthony Adverse
- Olivia Anakwe (did not graduate) – fashion model
- Joseph Bathanti (A&S 1976) – poet, writer, professor; NC Poet Laureate, 2012–2014
- Peter Beagle (A&S 1959) – Hugo Award-winning fantasist and author of novels, nonfiction, and screenplays
- Jeff Bergman (A&S 1983) – voice actor who provides modern-day voices of classic cartoon characters including Bugs Bunny and Daffy Duck
- Frank E. Bolden (BS 1934) – journalist known for his work as a World War II correspondent for the Pittsburgh Courier
- DJ Bonics (2002, real name Brandon Glova) – radio DJ, hip hop DJ for Wiz Khalifa
- Mark Bulwinkle (BFA 1968) – graphic artist and sculptor
- Michael Chabon (A&S 1984) – Pulitzer Prize-winning author of The Amazing Adventures of Kavalier & Clay, The Yiddish Policemen's Union, and The Mysteries of Pittsburgh
- Murray Chass (A&S 1960) – award-winning baseball journalist for The New York Times
- Michael Clinton – writer and photographer
- Bill Cullen – host of many television game shows
- Virginia Cuthbert (MFA 1934) – artist
- Stephen Dau – writer
- Jim Donovan – professional drummer and percussionist, best known as the former drummer and one of the founding members of the band Rusted Root
- Morton Fine (MA, English) – screenwriter/producer, winner of the Writers Guild of America Award for The Pawnbroker
- Sharon G. Flake (A&S 1978) – award-winning author of young adult literature
- Jack Gilbert (A&S 1954) – award-winning poet
- Lester Goran (A&S 1951, MA 1961) – author
- Gabbie Hanna (A&S 2013) – YouTuber, singer-songwriter, author, and internet personality
- Ernie Hawkins (A&S 1973; degree in philosophy) – blues guitarist and singer
- Terrance Hayes (MFA 1997, faculty 2013–present) – poet whose books have won National Book Award for Poetry and National Poetry Series
- Samuel John Hazo (A&S 1957G) – novelist, playwright, first poet laureate of Commonwealth of Pennsylvania
- Paul Hertneky – writer
- Frederick A. Hetzel – University Press publisher
- Eddie Ifft – stand-up comedian, athlete (track and field, cross country)
- John Irving – author of The Cider House Rules and The World According to Garp; recipient of an Academy Award for Best Adapted Screenplay and a National Book Award for Fiction (did not graduate)
- Jero– Japanese pop artist known for fusion of hip-hop and enka
- Nicole Johnson (Public Health 2007) – Miss America 1999 and diabetes advocate
- Gene Kelly (A&S 1933) – Academy Award-winning dancer, actor, singer, film director, producer and choreographer, perhaps best known for performance in Singin' in the Rain
- Chris Kuzneski (A&S 1991, MEDU 1993) – New York Times best-selling author
- Jeanne Marie Laskas (MFA) – award-winning columnist, journalist, and author
- Lorin Maazel (A&S 1954) – conductor, violinist, and composer, New York Philharmonic
- Herb Magidson – lyricist, won first Academy Award for Best Original Song, in 1934
- Kellee Maize – musician, rapper and hip-hop artist
- Allison McAtee (A&S 2001) – actress, model, CSI: Miami, Life, Hell Ride, Bloomington
- Bebe Moore Campbell (EDU 1971) – author and journalist
- Jenna Morasca – actress, model and winner of Survivor: The Amazon
- Laci Mosley (A&S 2012) – actress, comedian and podcaster
- Thaddeus Mosley (A&S 1950) – sculptor who works mostly in wood
- Brett Murphy (A&S 2013) – member of Pulitzer Prize-winning team and individual finalist for the Pulitizer for journalism
- Ethelbert Nevin – pianist and composer, left school after one year
- David Newell (CGS 1973) – actor, Mr. McFeely on Mister Rogers' Neighborhood
- Beth Ostrosky – model, actress, and wife of Howard Stern
- Barbara Paul (PhD) – writer
- Susan Ressler (1971) – photographer
- Ed Roberson (A&S 1970, faculty) – award-winning poet
- Leo Robin (law degree) – composer and songwriter
- Fred Rogers – host of Mister Rogers' Neighborhood
- Zelda Rubinstein – actress best known for Poltergeist, earned bachelor's degree in bacteriology
- Neal Russo – sportswriter for St. Louis Post-Dispatch, Sporting News and Sports Illustrated
- Justin Sane (A&S 1998) – singer, guitarist of punk band Anti-Flag
- Julie Sokolow (A&S 2010) – documentary filmmaker, musician, and writer
- Brandon Som (A&S 2002G) – Pulitzer Prize-winning poet
- Jack Stauber – YouTuber, singer-songwriter, and animator most well known for his song "Buttercup" and Adult Swim collaborations
- Robert Sterling – actor best known for Topper
- Gerald Stern (BA, English) – National Book Award-winning poet
- Bill Strickland – founder of Manchester Craftsmen's Guild, an agency that inspires teenagers through the arts; board member of National Endowment for the Arts; awarded MacArthur prize
- Benjamin Tatar (bachelor's degree in English and drama) – actor
- Alaska Thunderfuck (AS) (real name Justin Honard) – drag performer, musician, winner of RuPaul's Drag Race: All Stars
- Regis Toomey (A&S 1921) – motion picture and television actor who appeared in over 180 films
- Wang Xiaobo (MS) – writer

== Athletics ==
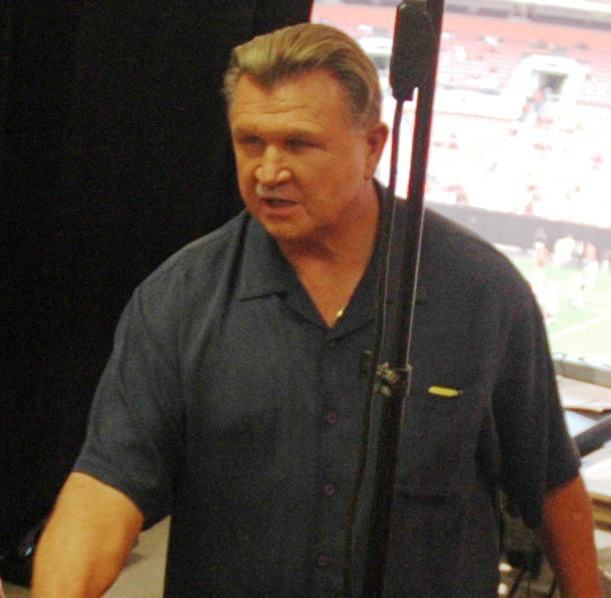
Mike Ditka, Hall of Fame tight end, coach, and broadcaster

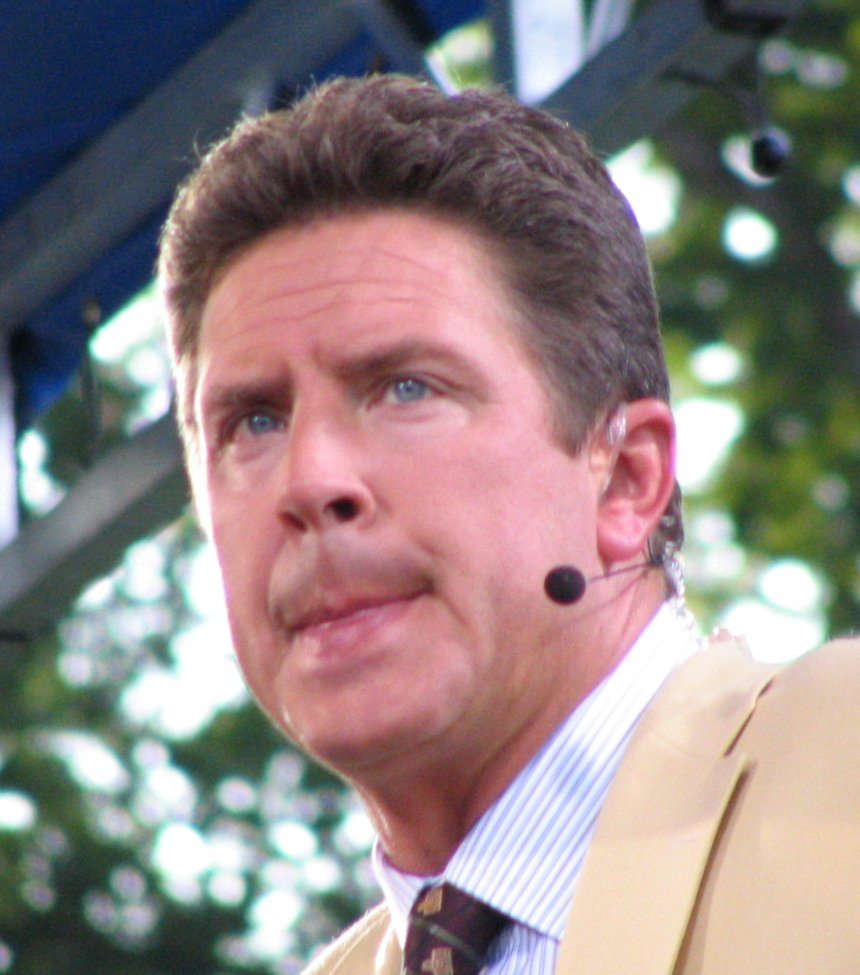
Dan Marino, Hall of Fame quarterback and broadcaster

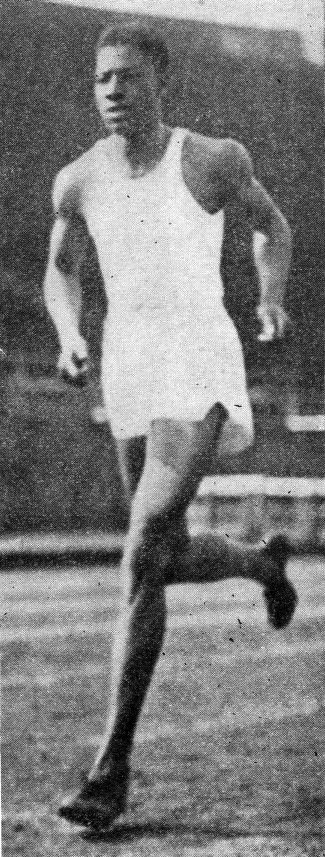
John Woodruff, gold medalist in the 800 meters at the 1936 Berlin Olympics

- Steven Adams – NBA starting center for Houston Rockets
- Britt Baker (DMD, 2018) – professional wrestler currently signed with All Elite Wrestling
- Adam Bisnowaty – NFL football offensive tackle for Carolina Panthers
- DeJuan Blair – power forward for Dallas Mavericks; consensus first-team basketball All-American in 2008–09
- Matthew Bloom – professional wrestler and San Diego Chargers football player
- Antonio Bryant – wide receiver for Tampa Bay Buccaneers and Fred Biletnikoff Award winner
- Clifford Carlson – Pitt basketball head coach, two national championships and one Final Four team ("Doc" Carlson received MD from Pitt)
- Marcus Carr (born 1999) – basketball player in the Israeli Basketball Premier League
- James Conner – running back for the Arizona Cardinals
- Jason Conti – Major League Baseball outfielder
- Beano Cook – ABC Sports and ESPN sports commentator
- Myron Cope – Hall of Fame Pittsburgh Steelers broadcaster
- Hailey Davidson – defender for the Dallas Trinity FC
- Mike Ditka – football player for Pitt and Chicago Bears, NFL coach, broadcaster, member of Pro Football Hall of Fame
- Aaron Donald – All-pro defensive end for the Los Angeles Rams
- Tony Dorsett – member of Pro Football Hall of Fame; Heisman Trophy, Maxwell Award, and Walter Camp Award winner
- Herb Douglas (Edu. 1948, 1950G) – bronze medalist in long jump at 1948 Summer Olympics
- Larry Fitzgerald – wide receiver for the Arizona Cardinals, Walter Camp Award and Fred Biletnikoff Award winner
- Bill Fralic – Atlanta Falcons offensive lineman, member of College Football Hall of Fame
- Marshall Goldberg (1917–2006) – two-time national champion and All-American, four-time All-Pro Chicago Cardinals running back and defensive back, member of 1947 NFL championship team, member of College Football Hall of Fame
- Aaron Gray – former center for the NBA's Detroit Pistons
- Hugh Green – pro football player; Lombardi Award, Maxwell Award, and Walter Camp Award winner
- Bobby Grier – Pitt football player, first African-American to play in Sugar Bowl
- Art Griggs – Major League Baseball player
- Russ Grimm – four-time Super Bowl-winning offensive lineman with Washington Redskins, assistant coach of Arizona Cardinals
- Mouhamadou Gueye – forward for the Toronto Raptors
- Damar Hamlin (Class of 2020) – safety for the Buffalo Bills
- Don Hennon – two-time All-American basketball guard and Helms Foundation Basketball Hall of Fame inductee
- Craig Heyward – NFL running back
- Dick Hoblitzel – Major League Baseball player for Cincinnati Reds and Boston Red Sox, MVP for the Reds
- Chuck Hyatt – three-time basketball All-American (1927–1930) under Coach Doc Carlson, member of Basketball Hall of Fame
- Russ Kemmerer – Major League Baseball pitcher
- Roger Kingdom (CGS 2002) – sprinter and hurdler, two-time Olympic gold medalist, former 110 m high hurdles world record holder
- Billy Knight – ABA and NBA basketball player, GM of Atlanta Hawks
- Andy Lee – football punter for the San Francisco 49ers of the National Football League
- Dion Lewis – running back for the Tennessee Titans
- Bill Maas – defensive tackle for Kansas City Chiefs and Green Bay Packers
- Ken Macha – former Major League Baseball player and manager
- Bob Malloy – Major League Baseball pitcher
- Dan Marino – quarterback for Pitt and Miami Dolphins, member of Pro Football Hall of Fame and television commentator
- Curtis Martin – pro football running back, fourth leading rusher of all time
- Mark May – ESPN sports commentator, football player, Outland Trophy winner
- LeSean McCoy – former running back for Buffalo Bills, Kansas City Chiefs, Philadelphia Eagles, and Tampa Bay Buccaneers
- George "Doc" Medich – Major League Baseball player
- Johnny Miljus – Major League Baseball player
- Sean Miller – basketball player at Pitt and head basketball coach at Arizona
- Kathryn Nesbitt – soccer assistant referee, part of the first American refereeing team to reach a FIFA World Cup final
- Bill Osborn (CGS 1989) – pro footballer, scout and color analyst
- Sam Parks Jr. – pro golfer, won U.S. Open in 1935 at Oakmont
- Johan Peñaranda – pro footballer, goalkeeper for FC Tulsa
- Kenny Pickett – Philadelphia Eagles quarterback
- Cumberland Posey (Pharm. 1915) – member of National Baseball Hall of Fame, player, manager, and team owner in Negro leagues, professional basketball player and team owner
- Darrelle Revis – defensive back for New York Jets
- Richard Rydze (MD 1975) – Olympic silver medalist in diving at 1972 Summer Olympics, men's 10 meter platform
- Joe Schmidt – NFL linebacker and head coach of Detroit Lions, 1967–1973
- Marty Schottenheimer – head coach of four NFL teams
- Jabaal Sheard – defensive end for the Indianapolis Colts
- Nike Sibande (2023) – basketball guard in the Israeli Basketball Premier League
- Trecia-Kaye Smith – long jump and triple jump, seven-time NCAA national champion, 15-time All-American, 4 national indoor titles, 2004 Olympics fourth place, 2007 IAFF Champion, named to USTF Silver Anniversary Team in 2007
- Sal Sunseri – college and professional football coach
- Jock Sutherland – Hall of Fame football coach, All-American football player; Pitt Professor of Dentistry
- Steve Swetonic – Major League Baseball pitcher
- Joe Walton – head coach of New York Jets, 1983–1989
- Dave Wannstedt – coach for several NFL and college teams, including University of Pittsburgh
- John Woodruff (Col. 1939) – gold medalist in 800 meters at 1936 Berlin Olympics
- Sam Young (2009) – small forward for Indiana Pacers; 2008 Big East Tournament MVP

== Business ==
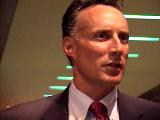
Marc Chandler, foreign exchange market analyst, writer, and speaker

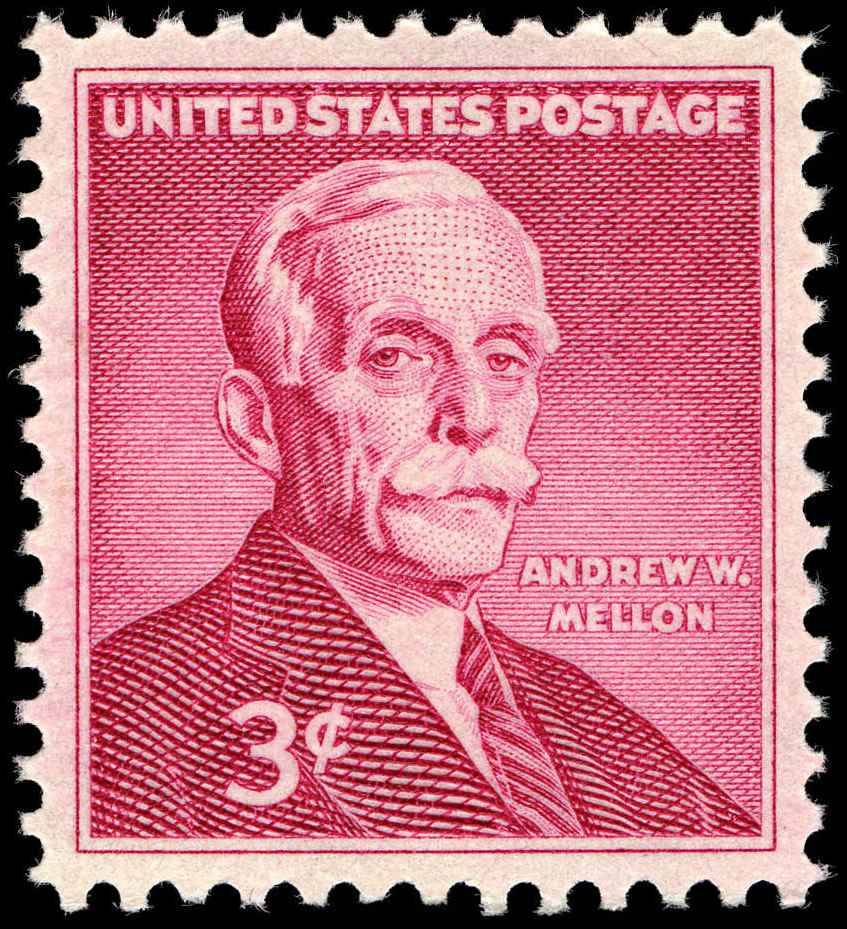
Andrew W. Mellon, banker, industrialist, philanthropist, art collector, and U.S. secretary of the treasury

- Walter Arnheim – Mobil Oil executive, corporate and non-profit advisor
- Susan Arnold (MBA, Katz 1980) – vice chairman of P&G, ranked 10th among the 50 most powerful women in business by Fortune
- George Barco (Law 1934) – cable television executive who played a key role in development of the industry
- Yolanda Barco (1949) – cable television executive
- Erik Buell (ENGR 1979) – engineer, founder and chairman of Buell Motorcycle Company, a subsidiary of Harley-Davidson
- Marc Chandler (MPIA, GSPIA 1985) – foreign exchange market analyst, writer, and speaker
- George Hubbard Clapp (Ph.B. Col. 1877) – aluminium industry pioneer
- Pat Croce (SHRS 1977) – entrepreneur, author, TV personality, and former president of the Philadelphia 76ers
- Mark Cuban (did not graduate) – businessman and investor, owner of Dallas Mavericks NBA franchise
- William S. Dietrich II (A&S 1980G, 1984G) – industrialist and philanthropist
- Ning Gaoning (MBA, Katz 1985) – chairman of COFCO International Limited, 2009 CNBC Asia Pacific's Asia Business Leader of the Year
- Joseph A. Hardy III (ENGR 1948) – founder and CEO of 84 Lumber and Nemacolin Woodlands Resort
- Frances Hesselbein (UPJ) – president and CEO of Leader to Leader Institute, former CEO for the Girl Scouts of the USA, and Presidential Medal of Freedom winner
- Dawne Hickton (1983 JD degree, school of law) – vice chair, president, CEO of RTI International Metals
- Emmett Leahy (1910–1964) – archivist and entrepreneur, pioneer in the discipline of records management
- Kevin March (CGS 1983, MBA 1984) – CFO and senior vice-president of Texas Instruments
- Kevin G. McAllister (Mechanical Engineering) – EVP The Boeing Company, president and CEO Boeing Commercial Airplanes
- Andrew W. Mellon (1874) – banker, philanthropist, U.S. secretary of the treasury, university trustee, donor, and founder of the Mellon Institute of Industrial Research
- Richard B. Mellon (1876) – banker, philanthropist, university trustee, founder of Mellon Institute of Industrial Research
- Thomas Mellon (Col. 1837) – founder of Mellon Financial, judge
- Larry Merlo (Pharm BS 1978) – president and CEO of CVS Health
- Arturo C. Porzecanski (MA 1974, PhD 1975) – 2005 Legacy Laureate, pioneer in emerging markets research on Wall Street, former chief economist at ABN AMRO
- Al Primo (A&S 1958) – television news executive credited with creating "Eyewitness News" format
- Art Rooney II (A&S 1978) – president and co-owner of the NFL's Pittsburgh Steelers
- Brent Saunders (A&S, UCIS 1992) – CEO of Bausch & Lomb; former president of Schering-Plough Healthcare Products
- Kevin W. Sharer (MBA, Katz 1983) – chairman of Amgen
- Jagdish Sheth (MBA 1962, PhD 1966) – internationally recognized business consultant, author and educator
- Sung Won Sohn – member of Council of Economic Advisers during Nixon administration
- John A. Swanson (ENGR PhD 1966) – founder and retired President of ANSYS, innovator of finite element simulation software and technologies designed to optimize product development processes; winner of John Fritz Medal in engineering
- Burton Tansky – president and chief executive officer, Neiman Marcus Group, Inc.
- David Tepper (A&S 1978) – speculator, hedge fund manager; gave naming donation to Tepper School of Business, owner of the NFL's Carolina Panthers and the MLS's Charlotte FC.
- Thomas Usher (undergraduate, master's and Ph.D degrees) – chairman of U.S. Steel and Marathon Oil; director of Extra Mile Education Foundation and Boy Scouts of America
- David Wilstein (bachelor's degree in engineering) – real estate developer
- Tung Chao Yung – Chinese shipping magnate, founder of the Orient Overseas Line (now OOCL), and owner of the largest ship ever built

== Education ==
- Bowman Foster Ashe (BS 1910, faculty) – first president of the University of Miami
- Stanley F. Battle (M.P.H. 1979, PhD 1980) – educator, author, activist, leader of North Carolina Agricultural and Technical State University, Coppin State University and Southern Connecticut State University
- Steven C. Beering – president emeritus, Purdue University and former dean of the Indiana University School of Medicine
- Todd H. Bullard – former president of Potomac State College and Bethany College
- Carol A. Cartwright – president of Kent State University, 1991–2006
- Paul Russell Cutright – historian and biologist
- Teresa Abi-Nader Dahlberg – 11th president of the University of Tampa
- Helen Faison (BA 1946, MA 1955, PhD 1975) – first African-American, first woman to become superintendent of Pittsburgh district schools
- Claire Finkelstein, professor at the University of Pennsylvania Law School
- Christine Fulwylie-Bankston (PhD 1974) – educator, writer, civil rights activist
- Adam Herbert – president of Indiana University
- Young Woo Kang (EDUC 1973G, 1976G) – special education expert; author; former policy advisor of National Council on Disability
- Ambrose King (Yeo-Chi King) – former vice-chancellor of Chinese University of Hong Kong
- Jacqueline Liebergott – president of Emerson College
- Michael Lovell (ENGR 1989, 1991, 1994) – former chancellor of University of Wisconsin–Milwaukee, president of Marquette University
- Barry McCarty – former president of Cincinnati Christian University and national radio host
- Jay F. W. Pearson (AB, MA, faculty) – former president of University of Miami
- Rebecca S. Pringle (BS) - President of the National Education Association
- Chunming Qiao — Professor at the University at Buffalo
- M. Richard Rose – former president of Alfred University and the Rochester Institute of Technology
- Brian Segal (Social Work 1971) – publisher and former president of Ryerson Polytechnical Institute and the University of Guelph
- Michael Slinger – director of law library at Widener Law, former president of ALL-SIS and Ohio Regional Association of Law Libraries
- Peter Woolley (PhD, 1989) – political scientist, founder of PublicMind
- Khodr Zaarour (MA, 1998) – professor of international relations; founder of the Muslim American Public Affairs Council

== History ==
- Leonard Baker (A&S 1952) – Pulitzer Prize-winning biographer
- Paul Russell Cutright (PhD, faculty) – historian and biologist
- Kenneth Sacks (AB 1969) – professor of History and Classics, Brown University

== Military ==
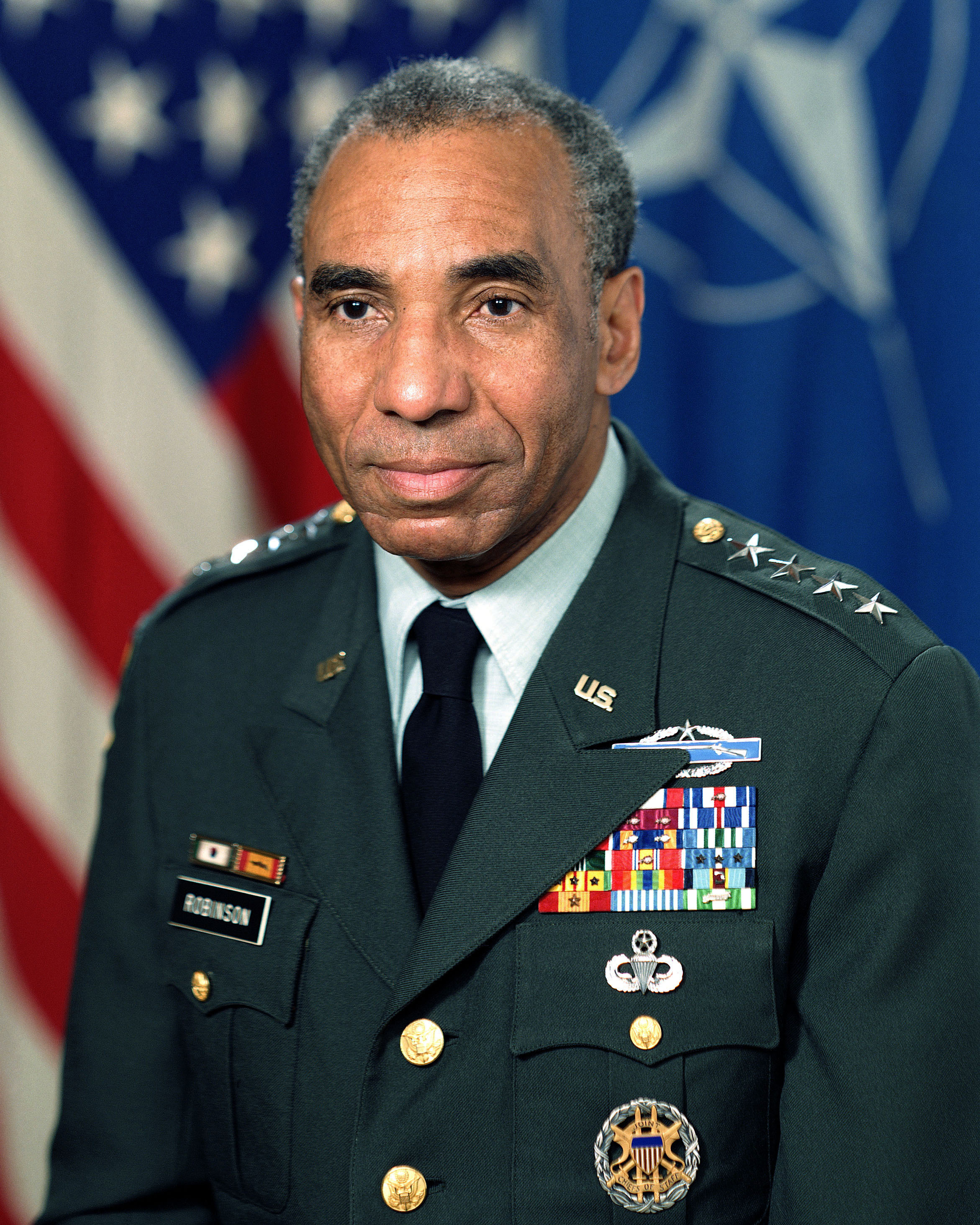
General Roscoe Robinson, the first African-American four-star general in United States Army

- Gust Avrakotos (A&S 1962) – CIA agent responsible for arming Afghan mujaheddin in 1980s
- Samuel W. Black (A&S 1834) – colonel, hero of Mexican and Civil wars
- Patricia Horoho (NURS 1992G) – Army's 43rd Surgeon General, commanding general of U.S. Army Medical Command
- Nicholas P. Kafkalas (1949) – US Army major general
- Thomas J. Lynch (Eng 1940) – Army Air Forces lieutenant colonel and a flying ace of World War II; Distinguished Service Cross recipient
- Roscoe Robinson, Jr. (GSPIA 1965) – first African-American four-star general
- James Martinus Schoonmaker – Civil War Medal of Honor recipient
- Joseph "Colonel Joe" H. Thompson (Col. 1905, Law 1908) – Medal of Honor recipient, College Football Hall of Fame inductee
- Boyd Wagner (Eng 1938) – first Army Air Forces fighter ace of World War II; Distinguished Service Cross recipient

== Philosophy ==
- Nancy Cartwright (A&S 1966) – MacArthur Fellowship-winning philosopher noted for her work in philosophy of science, philosophy of economics, and philosophy of physics
- Patricia Churchland (MA 1966) – 1991 MacArthur Prize-winning philosopher noted for her work in philosophy of mind and neurophilosophy; associated with a school of thought called eliminativism or eliminative materialism
- Stephen Hetherington (MA 1986; Ph.D. 1987) – philosopher noted for his work in epistemology, emeritus professor in the school of humanities and languages at the University of New South Wales
- Sandra Mitchell (PhD 1987, faculty) – professor and chair of the department of History and Philosophy of Science
- Holmes Rolston III (MS A&S 1968) – Templeton Prize-winning philosopher best known for his contributions to environmental ethics and the relationship between science and religion
- Ernest Sosa (PhD 1964) – international leader in virtue epistemology, inaugural winner of the Rescher Prize in Philosophy

== Politics, law, and activism ==
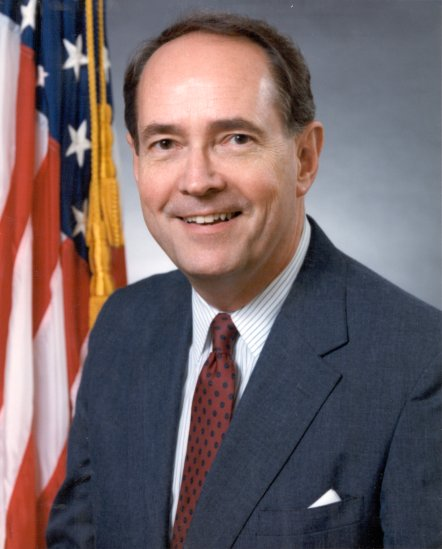
Richard Thornburgh, former governor of Pennsylvania and U.S. attorney general, whose archives are housed in the university's Hillman Library

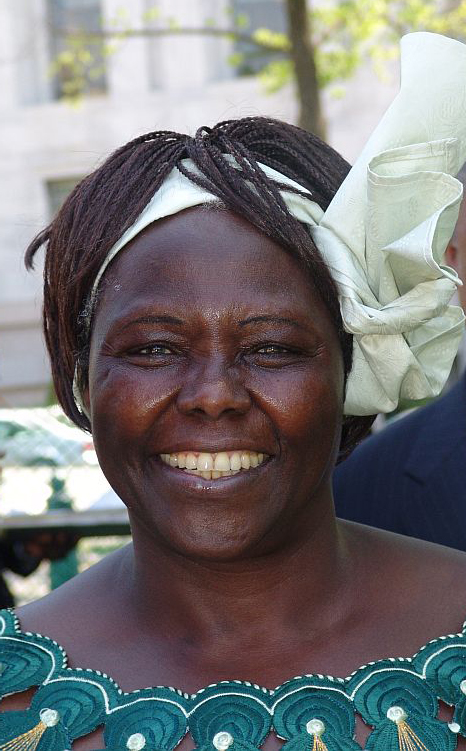
Wangari Maathai, 2004 Nobel Peace Prize recipient and subject of the documentary Taking Root

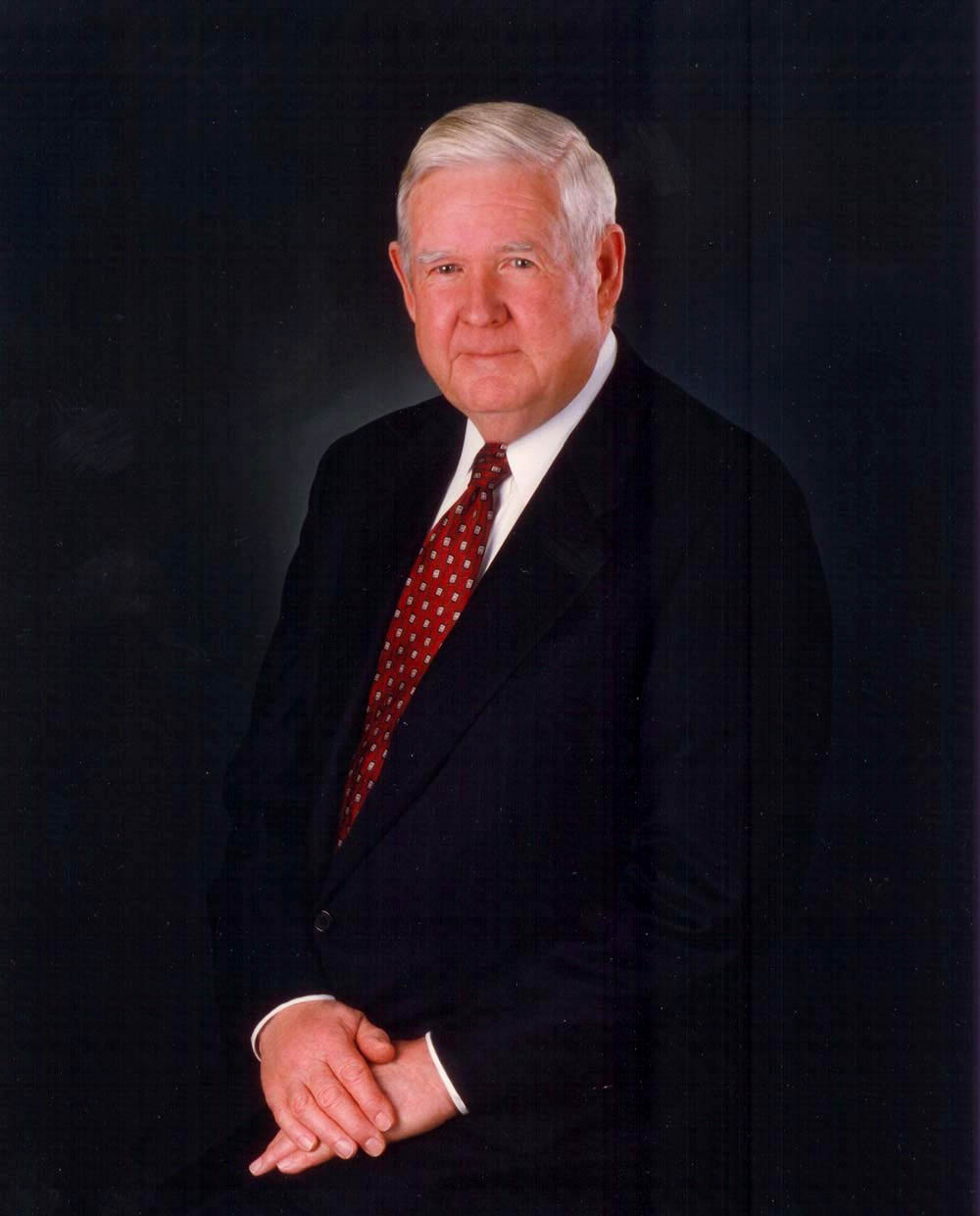
John Murtha, former U.S. congressman

- Hanan Al-Ahmadi (PhD 1995) – assistant speaker of the Consultative Assembly of Saudi Arabia
- Ruggero J. Aldisert – judge on United States Court of Appeals for the Third Circuit; adjunct professor at School of Law
- Roozbeh Aliabadi (MPIA 2008) – advisor to Ministry of Foreign Affairs in Iran and political commentator
- Anne X. Alpern (EDU 1923, Law 1927) – Pennsylvania attorney general and Pennsylvania Supreme Court justice; first woman to serve as a state attorney general
- W. Thomas Andrews (L.L.B. 1966) – Pennsylvania state senator
- Eugene Atkinson – member of House of Representatives from Pennsylvania
- Gust Avrakotos – case officer CIA; known for massive arming of Afghan Mujahideen in 1980s in Soviet–Afghan War, chronicled in book Charlie Wilson's War: The Extraordinary Story of the Largest Covert Operation in History by George Crile
- Max Baer (A&S 1971) – justice on Pennsylvania Supreme Court (2003–present)
- Derrick Bell (Law 1957) – law professor, first tenured black professor at Harvard Law School, dean of Oregon Law School
- Michael Bilirakis – Republican member of United States House of Representatives
- Samuel W. Black (A&S 1834) – seventh governor of Nebraska Territory
- Henry Marie Brackenridge (Academy) – writer, lawyer, judge, superintendent, and U.S. congressman
- Frank Buchanan – Democratic member of U.S. House of Representatives and Mayor of McKeesport, Pennsylvania (1924–1928 and 1931–1942)
- Joseph Buffington (Col 1825) – two-term Whig member of the U.S. House of Representatives
- Linda Drane Burdick (A&S 1986, Law 1989) – chief assistant state attorney at Orange and Osceola County State Attorney's Office in Orlando, Florida; lead prosecutor on State of Florida vs. Casey Anthony case
- Ralph J. Cappy (A&S 1965, Law 1968) – justice (1990–2008) and chief justice of Pennsylvania Supreme Court (2003–2008)
- Ben Cardin (A&S 1964) – U.S. senator from Maryland
- Johnny Chiang (MPA) – Taiwanese politician who serves as the chairman of the Kuomintang, former penultimate minister of the Government Information Office, and member of the Legislative Yuan
- Steven Choi (SIS 1976G) – mayor of Irvine, California (2012–2016)
- Earl Chudoff (1932) – U.S. representative (1949–1958)
- Robert J. Cindrich (Law 1968) – former U.S. attorney and US district judge
- David I. Cleland (A&S 1954, KGSB 1958, faculty) – engineer and educator; the "father of project management"
- Bill Cobey (EDU 1968G) – former U.S. representative from North Carolina's 4th congressional district, director of Jesse Helms Center
- Harry W. Colmery (Law 1916) – author of G.I. Bill
- Robert J. Corbett – Republican member of U.S. House of Representatives from Pennsylvania
- William Corbett (A&S 1924, Law 1927) – former acting governor of Guam
- Father James Cox – U.S. presidential candidate in 1932 and labor activist
- Adrian Cronauer (A&S 1959) – disc jockey, attorney, activist, basis for movie Good Morning, Vietnam; helped found WPGH AM radio station
- Cornelius Darragh (Col. 1826) – U.S. district attorney for western district of Pennsylvania, abolitionist, Whig member of U.S. House of Representatives
- Harmar D. Denny, Jr. (1911) – U.S. representative (1951–1953)
- Eugene A. DePasquale (MPA 1997) – Pennsylvania auditor general
- Patrick R. Donahoe – Postmaster General
- James H. Duff (1907) – Pennsylvania governor (1947–1951), U.S. senator (1951–1957)
- Charlene Dukes (M.Ed. 1987, Ed.D. 1992) – first vice chair of the Maryland Democratic Party
- Harry Allison Estep (1913) – U.S. representative (1927–1933)
- Lucy Fato (1988) – corporate attorney, executive vice president and general counsel for Seaport Entertainment Group
- Tom Feeney (law degree) – U.S. representative
- Jay Fisette (GSPIA 1983) – member of Arlington County, Virginia's Board of Supervisors
- Tony Fratto (A&S 1988) – former deputy assistant and deputy press secretary to former US President George W. Bush; partner and global head of corporate communications at Goldman Sachs
- David Frederick – appellate attorney who has argued more than 50 cases before the Supreme Court of the United States
- George W. Guthrie (1866) – mayor of Pittsburgh, 1906–1909; ambassador to Japan
- Melissa Hart (law degree ) – U.S. representative, 2001–2007
- Orrin Hatch (law degree) – U.S. senator, 1976–2018
- David J. Hickton (Law 1981) – staff director and senior counsel to the House Select Subcommittee on the Coronavirus Crisis, former U.S. attorney for the Western District of Pennsylvania, director and founder of the University of Pittsburgh Institute for Cyber Law, Policy and Security
- Janice M. Holder (A&S 1971) – first female chief justice of Tennessee
- Mark R. Hornak (EDU 1978, Law 1981) – judge for U.S. District Court
- Frank Houben – Dutch provincial governor
- Peter Huang (graduate school for sociology 1964–1966, transferred) – political activist and failed assassin
- K. Leroy Irvis (Law 1954) – speaker of the Pennsylvania House of Representatives; first African-American speaker of the House of any U.S. state legislature since reconstruction
- William W. Irwin (Col 1824) – mayor of Pittsburgh and Whig member of U.S. House of Representatives
- Mahmoud Jibril (MA 1980, PhD 1985) – head of executive team (interim prime minister) of newly formed National Transitional Council of Libyan Republic
- Judith Krug (A&S 1962) – librarian and anti-censorship activist who co-founded Banned Books Week
- William Lerach (undergraduate and law degree) – securities class-action lawyer; leading attorney in corporate and securities litigation cases including Enron, WorldCom and AOL/Time Warner
- Roslyn Litman – successfully sued the NBA on behalf of blackballed player Connie Hawkins
- Walter H. Lowrie (Col 1826, faculty 1846–1851) – chief justice of state Supreme Court
- Wangari Maathai – 2004 Nobel Peace Prize winner
- Christopher Lyman Magee (1864) – powerful 19th-century Pittsburgh political boss
- Wilson McCandless (Col 1826) – federal judge and candidate for Democratic nomination for president of the United States
- Jonas R. McClintock – 8th mayor of Pittsburgh
- Samuel J. R. McMillan (Col 1846) – Republican U.S. senator from Minnesota
- Andrew W. Mellon (1874) – longest-serving U.S. secretary of the treasury (1921–1932), banker, philanthropist
- Natalie Mihalek – Republican member of the Pennsylvania House of Representatives
- Dalia Mogahed (KGSB 2004) – Muslim scholar
- Jim Moran – Democratic member of U.S. House of Representatives
- Clayton Morris (1999) – co-anchor of Fox and Friends on Fox News Channel
- John Murtha (CAS 1961) – U.S. representative, 1974–2010
- Susan Richard Nelson (Law 1978) – judge for United States District Court for the District of Minnesota
- Dan Onorato (Law 1989) – chief executive of Allegheny County, Pennsylvania and former Democratic nominee for governor
- Vjosa Osmani (Law 2004) – chairwoman of the Assembly of Kosovo, 2020–
- Ralph Pampena (M.S. in Public Administration) – Pittsburgh Police chief, 1987–1990
- Richard Pan (Med 1991) – California state assemblymember (2010–2014) and senator (2015–2022)
- David A. Reed (1903) – U.S. senator (1922–1935)
- James Hay Reed (A.M. 1872) – lawyer and U.S. federal judge
- Rick Santorum (MBA) – U.S. senator, 1995–2007
- Richard Mellon Scaife (A&S 1957) – conservative activist, newspaper publisher, philanthropist
- Elmer Eric Schattschneider – political scientist and former president of the American Political Science Association
- Bud Shuster (A&S 1954) – Republican member of U.S. House of Representatives (1973–2001)
- Richard M. Simpson – Republican member of U.S. House of Representatives
- Edgar Snyder (1966) – personal injury attorney
- Jon Soltz (GSPIA 2010) – chairman and co-founder of VoteVets.org
- Wilkins F. Tannehill (Academy student) – author, Whig politician, first mayor of Nashville, Tennessee
- Richard Thornburgh (law degree) – U.S. attorney general, governor of Pennsylvania
- Harve Tibbott – Republican member of the United States House of Representatives from Pennsylvania
- Tshering Tobgay (ENGR 1990) – prime minister of Bhutan (2013–2018)
- Debra Todd (Law 1982) – justice on Pennsylvania Supreme Court (2007–present)
- James A. Traficant Jr. – convicted U.S. representative from Ohio
- Aliyu Wamakko – former governor of Sokoto State in Nigeria (2007–2015)
- Mary Jo White (J.D. 1967) – Pennsylvania state senator
- William Wilkins – student in Pittsburgh Academy (forerunner to Pitt), U.S. senator (1831–1834); minister to Russia (1834–35); secretary of war (1844–45)
- James A. Wright (1927) – U.S. representative (1941–1945)
- Albert Wynn (A&S 1973) – Democratic member of U.S. House of Representatives
- Joseph "Chip" Yablonski (1965) – attorney, NFL Players Association; son of murdered labor leader Joseph Yablonski
- Faith B. Yisrael (BS, MPH 2004, DrPH 2007) – member of the Tobago House of Assembly
- Young Woo Kang (master's and Ph.D degrees) – member of National Council On Disability
- Chris Zurawsky (A&S 1987, GSPIA 2005) – journalist; director of communications and public affairs for Association of American Cancer Institutes; political candidate

== Science, medicine, and technology ==
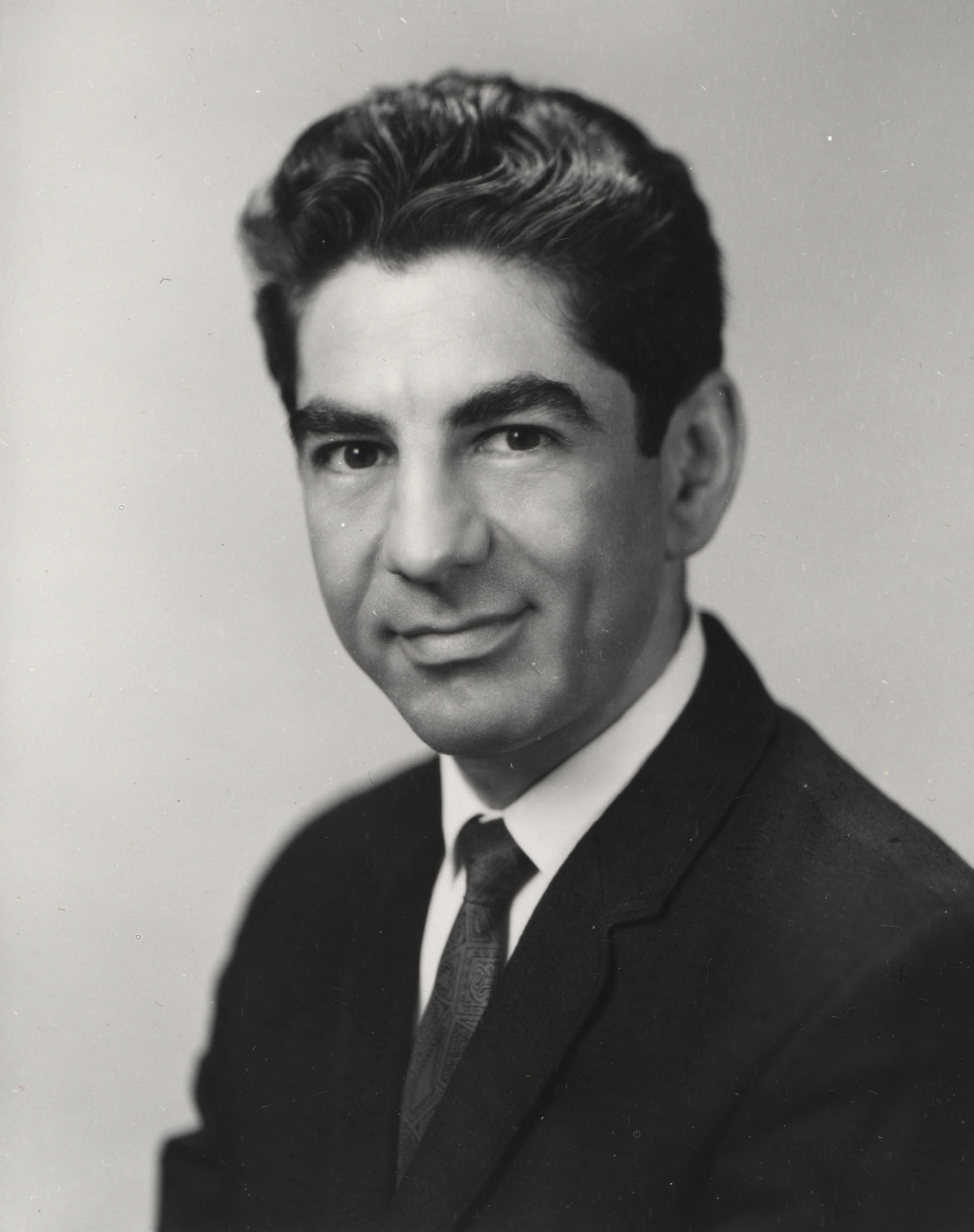
Jesse Steinfeld, former Surgeon General of the United States

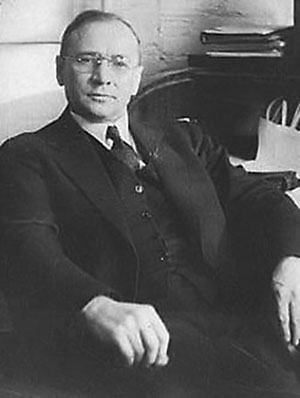
Vladimir Zworykin, considered one of the "fathers of television"

- Engin Arık (MSc 1971, PhD 1976) – Turkish particle physicist who headed the Experimental High Energy Physics group at the Boğaziçi University
- Harry Bisel (MD 1942) – pioneering medical oncologist, founding member of American Association of Clinical Oncology, American Society of Preventative Oncology and American Association for Cancer Education
- Christine L. Borgman (SIS 1974) – information sciences scholar
- Herbert Boyer (PhD) – biochemist; 1990 recipient of National Medal of Science; co-founder of Genentech
- Margaret W. "Hap" Brennecke – NASA metallurgist
- Jane A. Cauley (MPH 1980, DrPH 1983) – epidemiologist, University of Pittsburgh Cancer Institute
- Jingguang Chen (Ph.D.) – Chinese-American material scientist
- John Choma (ENGR 1963, 1964, MS 1965, PHD 1969) – professor and chair of Electrical Engineering-Electrophysics at University of Southern California
- Bob Colwell (ENGR 1977) – electrical engineer, chief architect on Pentium Pro, Pentium II, Pentium III, and Pentium 4 microprocessors
- William Hunter Dammond (ENGR 1893) – noted early African-American civil engineer who developed railway safety systems
- Sidney Dancoff (MS 1936) – theoretical physicist known for Tamm–Dancoff approximation method and for nearly developing renormalization method for solving quantum electrodynamics
- Lee Davenport (MS 1940, PhD 1946) – physicist responsible for development and deployment of SCR-584 radar system in World War II
- Catherine D. DeAngelis (MD 1969) – pediatrician; medical educator; first woman editor-in-chief of Journal of the American Medical Association
- G. Michael Deeb (A&S 1971, MD 1975) – cardiothoracic surgeon, Herbert Sloan Collegiate Professor of Surgery, and director of Multidisciplinary Aortic Clinic at University of Michigan Medical Center
- Emilio del Valle Escalante (PhD 2004) – professor of Latin American/indigenous literature, culture and social movements at University of North Carolina at Chapel Hill
- Bernard Fisher (MD, faculty) – pioneer breast cancer researcher
- Patrick D. Gallagher (MS 1987, PhD 1991) – physicist and 14th director of U.S. Department of Commerce's National Institute of Standards and Technology, Chancellor of the University since 2014
- George Otto Gey (A&S 1921, faculty) – scientist who first propagated the HeLa cell line
- Kevin Guskiewicz (MS EDUC 1992) – sports medicine scholar and MacArthur "Genius" Fellow; among first to identify long-term threats to athletes of multiple concussions
- David Halliday (A&S 1938, MS 1939, PhD 1941) – physicist known for textbooks Physics and Fundamentals of Physics
- Ann M. Hardy (PhD 1983) – Epidemiologist known for her research in AIDs surveillance and tracking and her expertise in human subject ethics
- Jacob Pieter Den Hartog (PhD 1929) – Timoshenko Medal winner for distinguished contributions to field of applied mechanics
- Philip Hench (Med 1920) – 1950 Nobel Prize co-winner in medicine with Mayo Clinic colleague Dr. Kendall, for work on adrenal cortex hormones
- Norman H Horowitz (A&S 1936) – geneticist, worked on genome organization and tests for famous one gene-one enzyme hypothesis, space scientist for Mariner and Viking missions to Mars
- Abul Hussam (PhD Chem 1982) – inventor of Sono arsenic filter
- Chevalier Jackson (1883) - physician and pioneer on layrngology
- Theresa J. Kaijage (PhD Social Work 2004) – Tanzanian NGO director and social worker known for HIV research and advocacy
- Rosella Kanarik (PhD Math 1934) – mathematics professor
- William Kelly – metallurgy graduate, industrialist and independent developer of Bessemer process
- Ravindra Khattree (PhD) – statistician of Fountain-Khattree-Peddada Theorem fame; author and editor
- Charles Glen King (MS 1920, PhD 1923, faculty) – biochemist noted for isolating vitamin C
- Paul Lauterbur (PhD) – 2003 Nobel Prize winner in medicine for invention of MRI machine
- Benjamin Lee (MS) – elementary particle physicist and head of Theoretical Physics Department at Fermi National Accelerator Laboratory
- Bert W. O'Malley (A&S 1959, Med 1963) – molecular endocrinologist and 2008 National Medal of Science laureate
- Bennet Omalu (MPH 2004) – pathologist noted for discovery of chronic traumatic encephalopathy in football players while at Pitt
- Peter Pusey (PhD 1969) – emeritus professor of physics at University of Edinburgh awarded Rhodia Prize for study of dynamically arrested particulate matter
- Joan Redwing – professor of materials science and engineering and electrical engineering at Pennsylvania State University
- Emily Rice – astronomy professor at City University of New York
- Washington Roebling (not a graduate) – civil engineer known for work on Brooklyn Bridge
- Michelle Rogan-Finnemore (BSc (Hons)) – geologist, legal expert, Antarctic program manager
- John Wistar Simpson (MS) – pioneer in nuclear energy; recipient of Edison Medal
- Rebecca Skloot (MFA) – freelance science writer, author, specializes in science and medicine
- Mary Margaret Speer (PhD math 1935) – mathematician
- Jesse Leonard Steinfeld (BS) – Surgeon General of the United States, 1969–1973
- Lap-chee Tsui (PhD) – geneticist who identified defective gene that causes cystic fibrosis; president of HUGO, the international organization of scientists involved in Human Genome Project; former Vice-Chancellor of University of Hong Kong
- William E. Wallace (PhD Chem 1941 & faculty) – physical chemist and Guggenheim Fellow who worked on Manhattan Project
- Edward J. Wasp (A&S MS 1962) – Elmer A. Sperry Award-winning engineer and inventor known for developing long distance slurry pipelines
- Cyril Wecht (A&S 1952, Med 1956, LLB 1962, faculty) – forensic pathologist
- John Wheatley (PhD 1952) – Fritz London Memorial Prize winner known for his research on liquid helium-3
- Jerome Wolken (BS 1946, MS 1948, Ph.D. 1949) – biophysicist
- Wu Yundong (PhD 1986) – theoretical organic chemist
- Nancy Zahniser (PhD 1977) – pharmacologist
- Vladimir Zworykin (A&S PhD 1926) – inventor, engineer, pioneer of television technology, sometimes called "father of television"

== Other ==
- Dosia Carlson (PhD) – minister and hymnwriter
- Lisa Mantini (BS) – mathematician
- Marie Hochmuth Nichols (BS, MS GAS 1936) – influential rhetorical critic
- Charles D. Provan (student, never graduated) – author of controversial books and articles on Christian topics and holocaust denial
- Harry K. Thaw (never graduated) – murderer and son of coal and railroad baron William Thaw

== See also ==
- List of University of Pittsburgh faculty
