= Slinger =

Slinger or Slingers may refer to:

== Military ==
- Slinger, a soldier who uses a sling
- HMS Slinger, three Royal Navy ships
- Slinger (weapon system), an Australian-made anti-drone weapon system
- Balearic slinger

== People ==
- Joey Slinger (born 1943), Canadian journalist and humourist
- John Slinger, British Member of Parliament
- Jonathan Slinger (born 1972), British actor
- Michael Slinger, American law professor and academic administrator
- Mimi Slinger (born 2003), British actress
- Nigel Slinger (born 1937), Guyanese former cricketer
- Penny Slinger, American artist
- Richard Slinger and Chuck Slinger, ring names of retired American professional wrestler Richard Aslinger (born 1971)
- Slinger Francisco (born 1935), Trinidadian calypso vocalist, songwriter, and guitarist better known as Mighty Sparrow

== Other uses ==
- Slingers (Marvel Comics), a fictional group of superheroes in the Marvel Comics universe
- The Slingers, an Australian alt-country group
- Slinger (dish), a specialty dish served in American, mid-western diners
- Slinger, Wisconsin, a village in Wisconsin, United States
  - Slinger High School
- Singapore Slingers, a club in the Australian National Basketball League

== See also ==
- Slinger Speedway, an automobile race track in Slinger, Wisconsin
- Sling (disambiguation)
