= Kevin March =

Kevin March may refer to:

- Kevin March (businessman), American business executive
- Kevin March (musician), American drummer, record producer and songwriter
