= Joseph M. Katz Graduate School of Business =

Business school of the University of Pittsburgh

Coordinates: 40°26′27″N 79°57′12″W

- Type: State-related
- Established: 1960
- Dean: Gene Anderson
- Faculty: 113
- Postgraduates: 913 (full and part time)
- Location: Pittsburgh, Pennsylvania, United States
- Campus: Oakland (Main)
- Website: www.business.pitt.edu

The Joseph M. Katz Graduate School of Business is the graduate business school of the University of Pittsburgh located in Pittsburgh, Pennsylvania. Although business education had its origins at the university in 1907, the Graduate School of Business was established in 1960 from a merger of its predecessors, the School of Business Administration and the Graduate School of Retailing. It was renamed in 1987 after businessman and university alumnus benefactor Joseph Katz.

The school offers a traditional, accelerated, part-time, business analytics, and executive Master of Business Administration (MBA) degrees as well as Master of Science degrees in Accounting, Business Analytics, Finance, Information Systems, Management, Marketing, Supply Chain Management and several Ph.D. programs in business.

Katz is part of Pitt Business, which refers to the collective capacity of Katz and the College of Business Administration (offers undergraduate business degrees), and five education and research centers.

== History ==
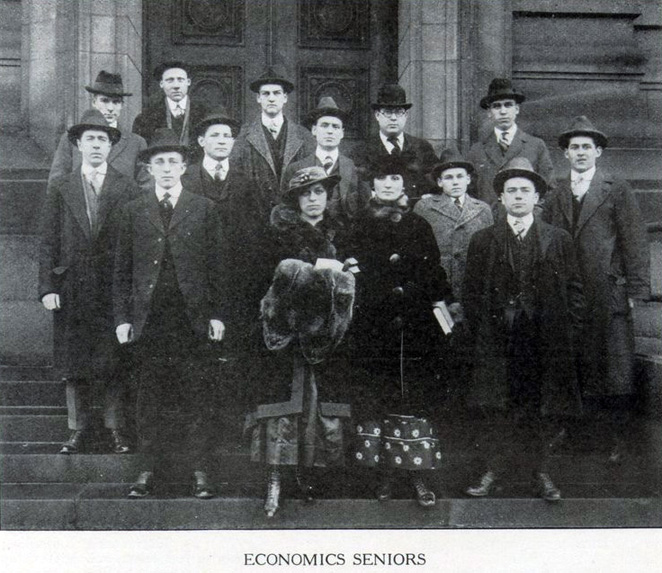
The 1916 senior class of the School of Economics, the forerunner to Pitt's business school. In the center of the front row are the school's first two female graduates, Florence Edith Wallace and Edith London.

The Katz School tracings its beginnings to the introduction of business education to the university in 1907 as the Evening School of Economics, Accounts, and Finance. Classes met in the Fulton Building on Sixth Street in Pittsburgh. Three years later in 1910, the School of Economics (named for the London School of Economics) was formally set up on Pitt's Oakland campus. In 1916, the school became one of the 17 founding members of the Association to Advance Collegiate Schools of Business (AACSB).

By 1923 the school was renamed again, this time as the School of Business Administration. In 1949, it became only the third school in the United States to offer executive management training programs. The Graduate School of Business came into existence in 1960 out of a merger with the School of Business Administration and Graduate School of Retailing. Marshall A. Robinson was assigned as dean of the new school, which discontinued the issuance of undergraduate degrees and had an MBA class of 25 students its first year. That same year, the school launched its first doctoral program as well.

In 1963, the school began offering a one-year MBA program, making it the first in the United States to offer the accelerated program. It was one of the first business schools to offer an MBA and Master of Information Systems dual degree. For much of the 1960s, business classes were held in the Cathedral of Learning and Bruce Hall. In 1972, Lou Mervis and wife Myra established a trust fund for Pitt's Graduate School of Business with a $2 million donation ($15.4 million in 2025 dollars). In their honor, the building now known as Thackeray Hall was named after them and dedicated as home of the business school. In 1983, a new building was built to house the business school, and the name was carried over to it.

In 1987, the business school was renamed after Joseph Katz, Pitt alumnus and founder of Papercraft Corporation, following his $10 million donation ($28.3 million in 2025 dollars) to the university. In the 1990s Katz became the first US institution to offer an MBA in Central Europe, and in 2002 launched a bioengineering dual-degree program. The Katz Graduate School of Business now oversees the administration of the undergraduate College of Business Administration.

In 2015, Arjang A. Assad was named the dean of Katz. Under Assad's leadership, the school launched a part-time hybrid online/in-person MBA program and the full-time MBA program earned its best U.S. News & World Report ranking in school history.

== Campus ==
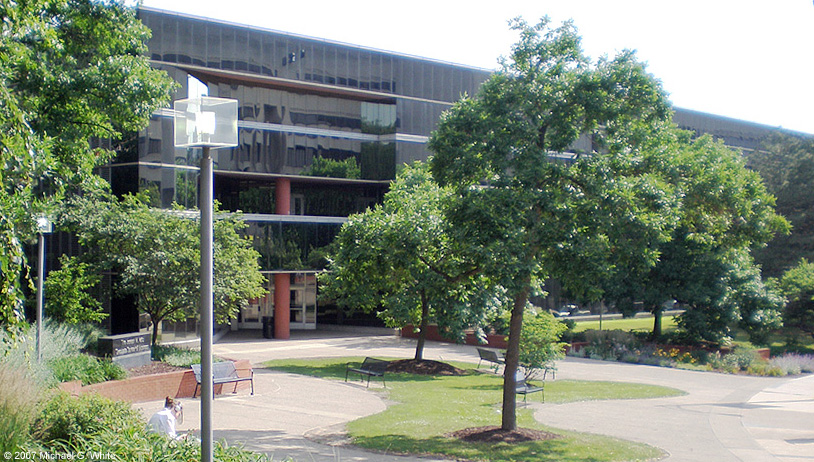
Mervis Hall, home of the Katz Graduate School of Business

Katz is housed in Mervis Hall, which was built in 1983 and is located on the Oakland campus. The facilities include a $2.3 million, 3,000-square foot Financial Analysis Laboratory, featuring a trading room, and a ticker for a realistic Wall Street trading room environment, a business library, a student kitchen, and Bottom Line Bistro coffee shop and cafe.

Katz's Center for Executive Education and Executive MBA Worldwide program is housed in Mellon Financial Corporation Hall which contains classrooms, laboratories, and meeting space, and is located on the fifth floor of Alumni Hall.

== MBA programs ==
The Katz Graduate School of Business offers several options to obtain an MBA including a traditional two-year MBA programs, an accelerated one-year MBA program, a part-time MBA program, joint degree MBA programs with various other schools within the university, and an Executive MBA program.

=== Traditional two-year MBA ===
Katz two-year students start in August and graduate 20 months later in April. Entrance statistics for the Full-Time Incoming Class of 2014 included 82 students with a 3.34 average grade point average, a 625 average GMAT score, and 3.8 years of work experience.

The MBA curriculum is divided into two types of courses: Core courses and elective courses. Core courses are required of all MBA students and are intended to provide students with the breadth of knowledge to build a solid business foundation. Full-time MBA students are required to take 27 credits of core courses encompassing Finance, Accounting, Economics, Statistics, Decision Technology, Organizational Behavior, Marketing, Strategy, and Information Systems. Elective courses which total 30 credits are intended to provide depth in a particular concentration. MBA students typically choose one or two concentrations and then choose electives within those concentrations.

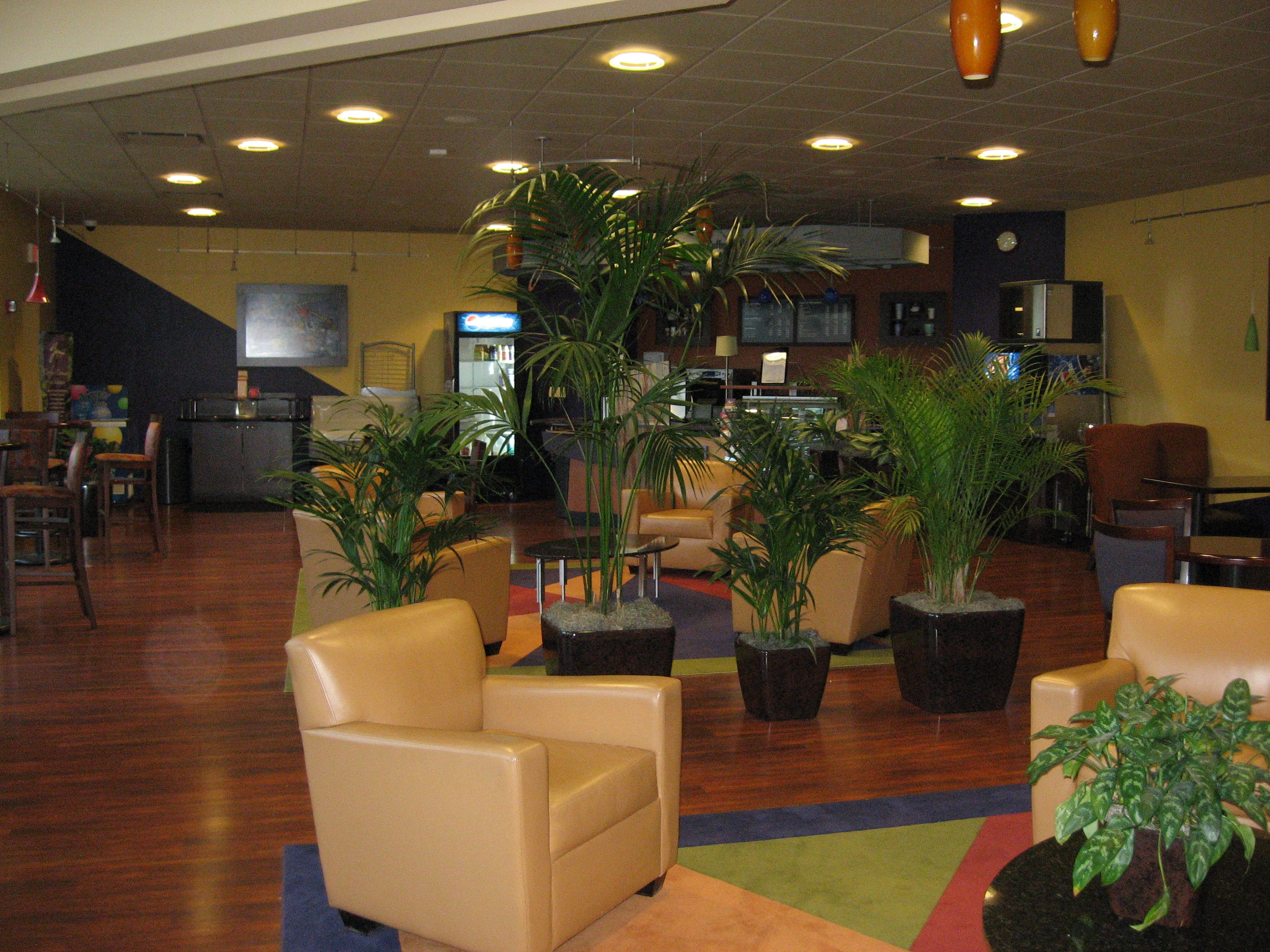
Student lounge in Mervis Hall

Katz concentrations:

- Finance
- Business Analytics
- Information Systems
- Marketing
- Operations Management
- Organizational Behavior & Human Resources Management
- Strategy, Environment, & Organizations

The Katz Graduate School's program features an Experience-Based Learning curriculum that allows student to work on various projects ranging from consulting and fellowship experiences to team-based business competition projects. Examples of these experiences include the Kenneth Woodcock Fellows in which students work with not-for-profits, the Randall Family Big Ideas Competition, and the Consulting Field Projects during which students have worked with such participating companies as Westinghouse Electric Company, Siemens, Philips, and PNC Financial Services.

Katz also offers ten MBA certificates which are designed to allow students to enhance the core curriculum according to their career goals: Global Supply Chain Management; Technology, Innovation, and Entrepreneurship; Organizational Leadership; Global Management; Corporate Valuation; Corporate Financial Management; Investments and Trading; Project Management; Digital Marketing; and Business Analytics. Katz is a partner of the CFA Institute. As a partner school, the finance curriculum covers 70% of the topics on the CFA exam. Katz also offers scholarships that fund students’ costs for pursuing a CFA.

For the Class of 2019, 94 percent of Katz MBA graduates received job offers within three months of graduation earning an average salary and bonus of $107,793.

=== Non-traditional and joint degree programs ===
- One-year MBA
- Part-time MBA
- Executive MBA
- Joint program with Law School (MBA/JD)
- Joint program with Swanson School of Engineering (MBA/MS in Engineering)
- Joint program with Graduate School of Public and International Affairs (MBA/MPIA and MBA/MID)
- Joint program within Katz in Information Systems (MBA/MS-MIS)
- Joint program within Katz in International Business (MBA/MIB)

The Katz Graduate School was the first school to offer a one-year MBA program in the United States when it instituted the program in 1963. The program begins in August and finishes the following July, covering the same ground that a traditional MBA program covers in two years. For flexibility, Katz offers electives in the day and evening, as well as some Saturday courses. The one-year program is designed primarily for people with strong academic backgrounds in economics or business and substantial work experience. Program requirements include a minimum of 51 credits of approved graduate work, an appropriate distribution of required core courses and elective courses, and a minimum cumulative quality point average of 3.0.

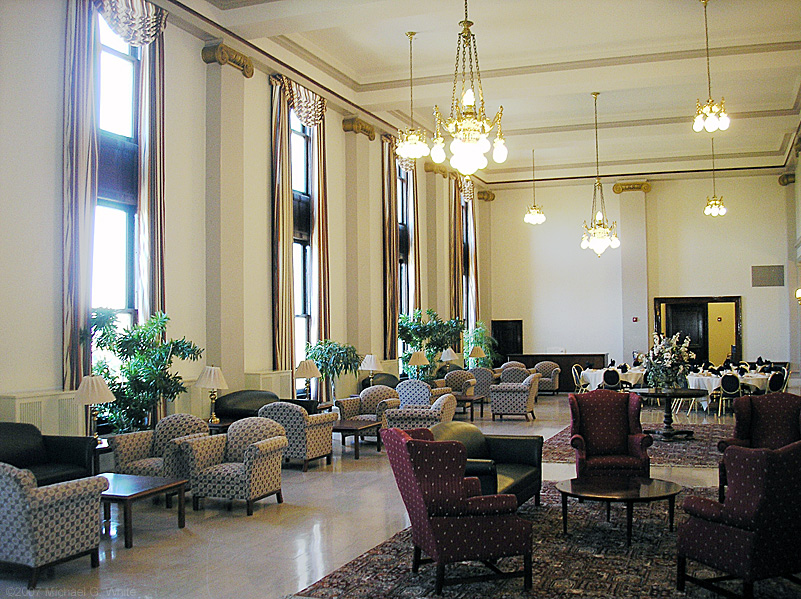
A lounge and meeting space of Katz's executive education center, Mellon Financial Hall, located in the university's Alumni Hall

The Katz part-time MBA program is intended for working professionals. The program takes about three years to complete with students taking classes around work hours. Classes are scheduled Monday through Thursday 6:20 to 9:20 p.m. and occasionally on Saturday from 9:00 to 11:45 a.m. Program requirements include a minimum of 51 credits of approved graduate work, an appropriate distribution of required core courses and elective courses, and a minimum cumulative quality point average of 3.0. Entrance statistics for the Incoming Class of 2014 included 169 students with a 3.24 average grade point average, a 555 average GMAT score, and 4.3 years of work experience.

Katz offers an Executive MBA that typically takes two years to complete and may be completed at one of many different extension facilities—in North America (Pittsburgh, Pennsylvania), South America (São Paulo, Brazil), and Europe (Prague, Czech Republic). Students take most of their courses at the site most convenient to them; however, they also participate in three week long immersion sessions, called Global Executive Forums, with their EMBA Worldwide classmates at other sites. Katz Executive MBA Worldwide program and Center for Executive Education is headquartered in Mellon Financial Corporation Hall on the fifth floor of the university's Alumni Hall.

=== Rankings ===
Business school rankings

U.S. MBA Rankings
- Bloomberg (2025): 49
- U.S. News & World Report (2026): 39(FT) 39(PT)

Global MBA Rankings
- FT (2026): 73

National rankings of Katz' MBA program include #37 by Forbes, #49 by Bloomberg BusinessWeek, and #39 by U.S. News & World Report. In global rankings, Katz was ranked #73 by Financial Times and #51 by The Economist.

The MBA program is also ranked among the top 20 in U.S. public universities by Poets&Quants.

The Katz Two Year MBA program has also been ranked #12 in the world by Times Higher Education and the Wall Street Journal.

== Masters Program ==
The Master of Science in Accounting (MAcc) program is a full-time, 30-credit professional graduate degree program that also prepares students to take the Certified Public Accountant (CPA) exam. Students with an undergraduate accounting degree, will be able to broaden their skills by also taking graduate courses outside accounting and complete the program in two terms. Students with limited background in accounting who are looking to change careers can take prerequisite courses as part of the program, which typically can be completed in four terms or fewer.

In addition to the Accounting program, Katz also offers Master of Science degrees for the following disciplines:

- Accounting and Business Analytics
- Finance
- Finance and Business Analytics
- Information Systems
- Management
- Management and Business Analytics
- Marketing Science
- Marketing Science and Business Analytics
- Supply Chain Management
- Supply Chain Management and Business Analytics
- Supply Chain Management and Industrial Engineering (A joint-degree program with the Swanson School of Engineering)

== Doctoral program ==
Katz offers a doctoral program that prepares students to become research-oriented faculty members. Doctoral students can focus in seven areas of study: Accounting; Business Analytics and Operations; Information Systems and Technology Management; Finance; Organizational Behavior and Human Resources Management; Strategic Management; Marketing. The faculty and doctoral students closely collaborate with researchers across the University of Pittsburgh, one of the nation's leading research institutions. Katz is ranked 39th in North America and 44th in the world from 2009 to 2013 in Business School Research contribution. One area of research that has generated numerous publications in finance is mergers and acquisitions (M&A) across a wide range of industries. Most faculty members are also very active in business projects from community development to consulting multinational companies.

== Research and education centers ==
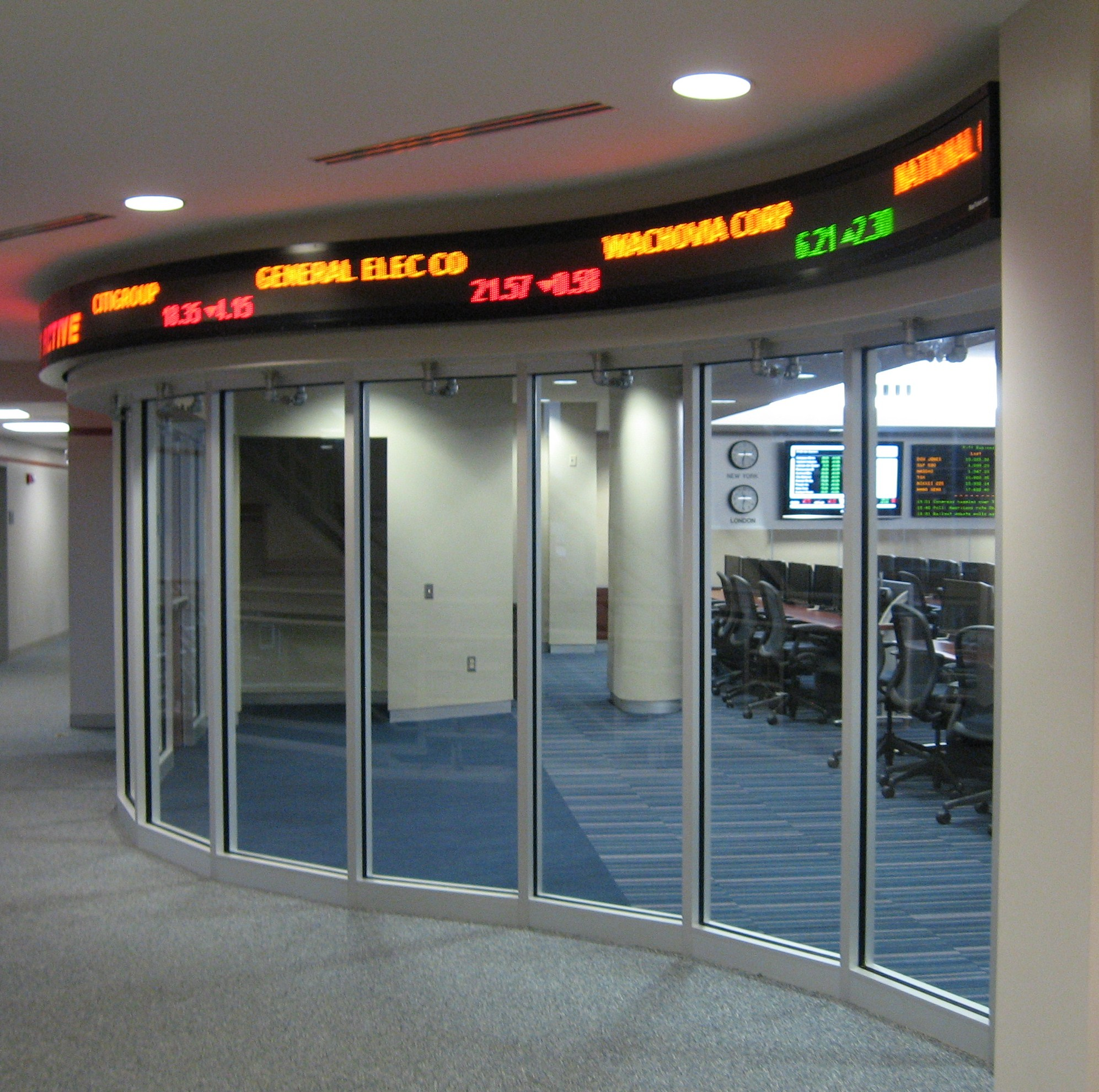
The financial lab in Katz's Mervis Hall simulates global financial markets.

There are nine education and research centers and initiatives within Pitt Business: the David Berg Center for Ethics and Leadership, Center for Branding, Center for Executive Education, Center for Healthcare Management, Center for Supply Chain Management, Business of Humanity Project, Center for Sustainable Business, and Katz International Center for Conflict Resolution. The later, designated as one of 33 national resource Centers for International Business Education and Research (CIBER) by the U.S. Department of Education, was founded in 1990 as a joint venture of Katz and Pitt's University Center for International Studies. It supports student global business projects, faculty development trips abroad, foreign language instruction programs, research grants, and foreign exchange programs. Katz maintains international linkages with colleges and universities around the world to facilitate study and research abroad. These include Monterrey Institute of Technology in Monterrey, Mexico, Universidad Tecnica Federico Santa Maria, in Valparaíso, Chile, the Universitat Augsburg, the Hochschule Pforzheim, Universität Witten/Herdecke and the European Business School near Frankfurt.

== People ==
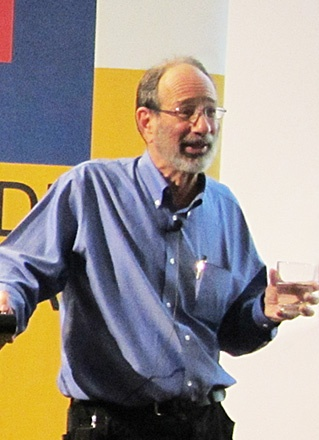
Alvin E. Roth conducted Nobel Prize–winning work in economics while serving on Katz faculty

=== Faculty ===
The faculty at Pitt Business consists of about 90 full-time professors, organized into seven different discipline groups: Accounting, Business Analytics and Operations, Finance, Information Systems and Technology Management, Marketing and Business Economics, and Organizations and Entrepreneurship. Pitt Business faculty members split their teaching duties between the school's undergraduate business program, MBA programs, Executive MBA program, the Masters of Science in Accounting program, and doctoral program. In addition, faculty members serve as directors of four centers that exist within the school: the David Berg Center for Ethics and Leadership, the Center for Supply Chain Management, the Center for Health and Care Work, and the International Business Center.

The Pitt Business faculty is ranked No. 51 in the world for research productivity from 2010 to 2014, according to the University of Dallas at Texas report, Top 100 Business Schools Research Rankings™, which is based on the number of publications faculty from a school contribute to 24 top academic journals.

In 2014, the marketing faculty was ranked No. 17 in the world for its research productivity, according to the American Marketing Association's doctoral special interest group (DocSIG). The report is based on the number of articles published in Journal of Consumer Research, Journal of Marketing, Journal of Marketing Research, and Marketing Science within the past five years. In addition, Pitt Business has three professors ranked No. 19 in the world for their individual research productivity in the four aforementioned academic journals.

Members of the faculty have received the University of Pittsburgh's Chancellor's award in the categories of distinguished public service, teaching, and research.

The following notable individuals have served as faculty at Pitt Business.

- Nobel Prize–winning economist Alvin E. Roth previously served on the faculty at the school.
- Jagdish Sheth, an internationally recognized business consultant and Katz alumni, served as the Albert Frey Professor of Marketing in 1973–1974.
- Thomas Saaty, Distinguished University Professor, developed the Analytic Hierarchy Process, a structured technique based on mathematics and psychology that assists in complex decision making. He received the University of Pittsburgh's Chancellor's Distinguished Research Award Recipient in 2009.

=== Alumni ===
The following notable individuals are graduates of the Katz Graduate School of Business.

- Susan Arnold (MBA 1980) former President of Global Business Units of Procter & Gamble, President and Principal Executive Officer of The Folgers Coffee Company and member of the board of directors of The Walt Disney Company.
- Ning Gaoning (MBA 1985) Chairman of China Foods Limited, 2009 CNBC Asia Pacific's Asia Business Leader of the Year
- Kevin March (MBA 1984) CFO and Senior Vice-President of Texas Instruments
- Rick Santorum (MBA 1981) former United States Senator from Pennsylvania and 2012 Republican presidential candidate.
- Kevin W. Sharer (MBA 1983) CEO of Amgen, Inc.
- Jagdish Sheth (MBA 1962, PhD 1966) internationally recognized business consultant, author and educator; the Charles H. Kellstadt Professor of Marketing at the Goizueta Business School of Emory University
- Raymond W. Smith (MBA 1969) Chairman of the private equity firm Arlington Capital Partners. Retired Chairman and Chief Executive Officer of Bell Atlantic (now Verizon).

== See also ==
- List of United States business school rankings
- List of business schools in the United States
- University of Pittsburgh College of Business Administration (Pitts' undergraduate business school)
