= Sling =

Sling may refer to:

== Places ==
- Sling, Anglesey, Wales
- Sling, Gloucestershire, England, a small village in the Forest of Dean

== People with the name ==
- Otto Šling (1912–1952), repressed Czech communist functionary

== Arts, entertainment, and media ==
- Sling (album), a 2021 studio album by Clairo
- Sling (Transformers), a fictional character
- Sling TV, an American streaming television service operated by Dish Network

== Clothing ==
- Baby sling, a piece of fabric tied to carry a child or infant
- Sling swimsuit, a type of swimsuit, sometimes a bikini variant
- Slingback, a type of woman's shoe

== Companies ==
- Sling Aircraft

== Devices and weapons ==
- Sling (cannon), an early modern gunpowder weapon
- Sling (climbing), a loop of webbing that can be wrapped around rock or tied to other equipment
- Sling (firearms), a type of strap or harness that allows convenient carrying of a long gun and/or bracing of the weapon for better stability during aiming
- Sling (furniture), a suspended, free-swinging chair, bed, or hammock
  - Sex swing, also known as a "sling"
- Sling (rigging), a component used in a rigging system for lifting, frequently made of wire rope or synthetic fiber
- Sling (weapon), a device used to hurl projectiles
  - Slingshot (esp in the United States), a small hand-powered projectile weapon
- Hawaiian sling, a device used in spearfishing

== Drinks ==
- Sling (drink), a mixed drink, originally American, composed of spirit and water, sweetened and flavoured
  - Singapore Sling, a cocktail that was invented by Ngiam Tong Boon for the Raffles Hotel in Singapore

== Medicine ==
- Sling (implant), in surgery
- Sling (medicine), a device to limit movement of the shoulder or elbow while it heals

== Technology ==
- Apache Sling, a Java web framework
- Sling Media, an American technology company that provides placeshifting and Smart TV technology
  - Slingbox, a television streaming media device

== See also ==
- Slinger (disambiguation)
- Slingshot (disambiguation)
