= Ann M. Hardy =

American epidemiologist and microbiologist

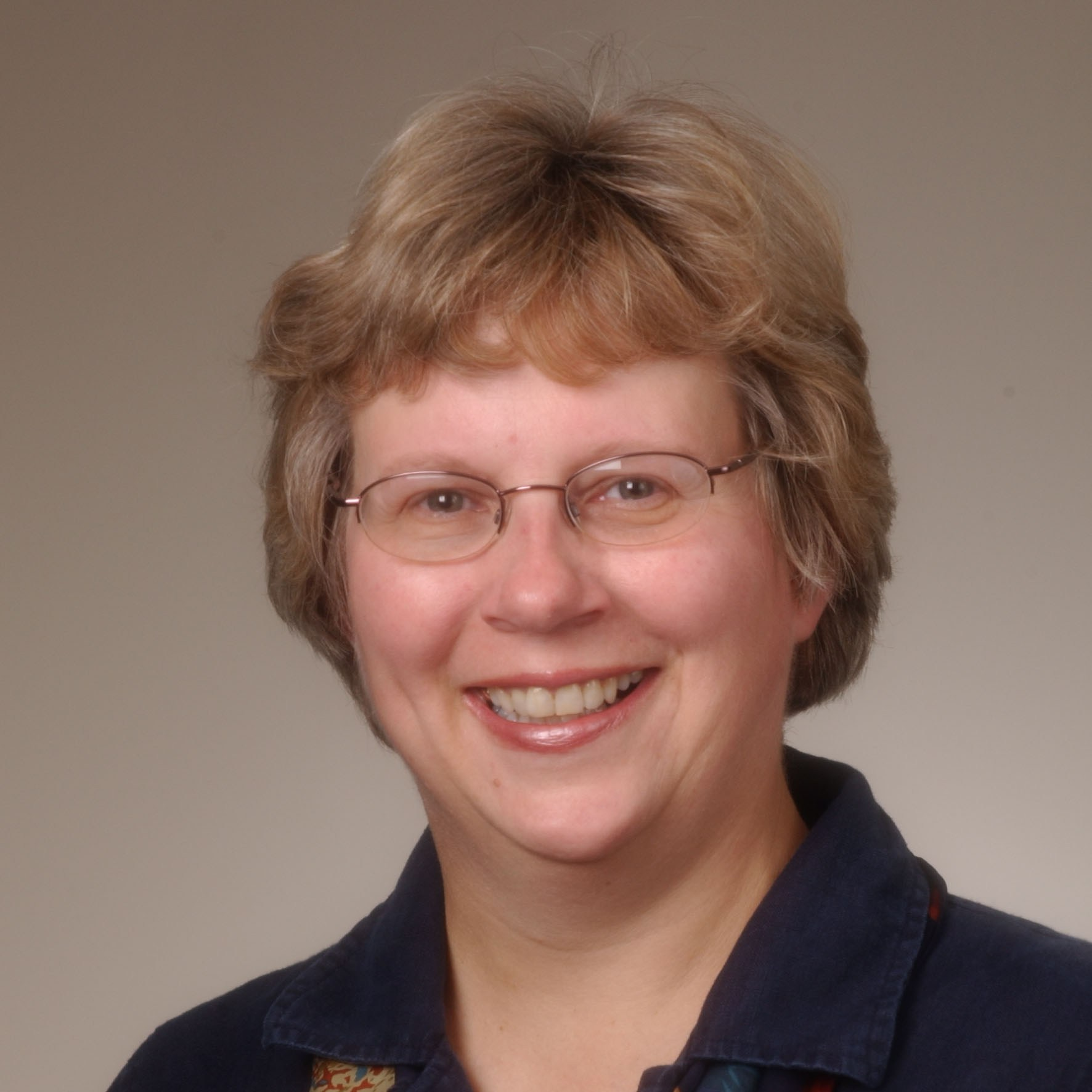
- Hardy in 2005
- Born: Ann Marie Hardy
- Education: University of Pittsburgh Graduate School of Public Health (MS, DrPH)
- Scientific career
- Fields: Human subjects protections, infectious disease epidemiology, health survey methods
- Workplaces: Centers for Disease Control and Prevention; National Institutes of Health
- Thesis: Infections in renal transplant recipients receiving cyclosporine (1983)

Ann Marie Hardy is an American epidemiologist and microbiologist who served as the human research protections officer at the National Institutes of Health Office of Extramural Programs.

== Education ==
Ann Marie Hardy completed a Master of Science degree in microbiology and a doctor of public health in epidemiology in 1983 at the University of Pittsburgh Graduate School of Public Health. Her dissertation was titled Infections in renal transplant recipients receiving cyclosporine.

== Career and research ==
Hardy spent 5 years at the Centers for Disease Control and Prevention working on AIDS surveillance and epidemiology. She then spent 12 years at the National Center for Health Statistics in various roles on the National Health Interview Survey.

Hardy served as a scientific review officer at the Center for Scientific Review (CSR) for 7 years in the Health of the Population Integrated Review Group (HOP IRG) where she established the Biostatistical Methods and Research Design study section. She was the deputy chief of the HOP IRG for her last 3 years at CSR.

In 2008, she joined the National Institutes of Health (NIH) Office of Extramural Programs (OEP) in the Office of Extramural Research (OER) as an extramural human research protections officer serving as the NIH coordinator for Certificates of Confidentiality.

Hardy's areas of expertise include human subjects protections, infectious disease epidemiology, and health survey methods.

Hardy, in her career, has authored over 50 government statistical reports or peer-reviewed journal articles. She also is an Institutional Review Board Specialist, working to ensure that research complies with ethical standards by reviewing research and monitoring ongoing studies.
