= Joseph M. Katz =

American entrepreneur

Joseph M. Katz (1913 - 1991) was an entrepreneur who founded a gift-wrap manufacturing company, the Papercraft Corporation. The University of Pittsburgh's Graduate School of Business is named in his honor, after his family made a large donation to the university.

== Biography ==
Katz grew up in the Hill District of Pittsburgh, Pennsylvania. He was born into a Jewish family. As a teenager, Katz and his three brothers turned their garage into a makeshift print shop, where they created cards, menus, and other stationery items, which they sold door-to-door. He also created and printed his own magazine, Boys Ideal.

Katz took pictures of the Pittsburgh Flood of 1936 and made a profit by selling them as a book. With this money, he started a wholesale paper business called "Printer's Paper Supply Company".

During World War II, Katz created the “Rite-Kit”, which was a box that contained paper, envelopes, and a pencil for servicemen.

In 1945, he founded Papercraft Corporation, for selling gift wrap, after acquiring a $10,000 investment.

Katz and his first wife Agnes donated $10 million to the University of Pittsburgh, his alma mater. At the time, this was the largest donation ever made to the university. The university renamed its business school the "Joseph M. Katz Graduate School of Business" in his honor in 1987.

In 1988 Joseph Katz and his son, Papercraft CEO Marshall Katz, relented control over the company though kept 30% of its stock.

He died of cancer in May 1991. He was survived by his children Marshall P. Katz and Andrea McCutcheon; grandchildren Jonathan S. Plesset, Nicole Plesset, and Lauren Katz; and great grandchild Jeffrey Plesset.
