= Paul Russell Cutright =

American historian

- Born: March 18, 1897; West Virginia, United States
- Died: March 11, 1988 (aged 90)
- Education: Davis and Elkins College, West Virginia University, A.B. and A.M. University of Pittsburgh, PhD. in Zoology
- Known for: Lewis and Clark Expedition
- Scientific career
- Fields: biology, history
- Workplaces: University of Pittsburgh, Geneva College, Beaver College/now Arcadia University

Paul Russell Cutright (March 18, 1897 – March 11, 1988) was an American historian, biologist, and professor, who was especially known for his work on the Lewis and Clark Expedition history and scientific achievements.

== Bibliography ==
- The Great Naturalists Explore South America (1940)
- Theodore Roosevelt, the Naturalist, Harper (1956), 297 pages
- Meriwether Lewis: Naturalist (1968)
- Lewis and Clark: Pioneering Naturalists (1969)
- A History of the Lewis and Clark Journals (1979)
- Theodore Roosevelt: The Making of a Conservationist, University of Illinois Press (1985), 285 pages
- With Michael J. Brodhead, Elliott Coues: Naturalist and Frontier Historian, University of Illinois Press (2001), 536 pages
