= Chunming Qiao =

Engineer and professor

Chunming Qiao is a Distinguished Professor and Computer Science and Engineering Department chairman at University at Buffalo, and an Elected Fellow of the IEEE.

== Education ==
Qiao earned his undergrad degree from University of Science and Technology of China. In 1983, Qiao earned a PhD in Computer Science from University of Pittsburgh.

== Career ==
In 1997, Qiao is the pioneer of Optical Burst Switching (OBS). In 2016, University at Buffalo and its partners received a $1.2 million grant from National Science Foundation to create a research facility to study self-driving cars. The research platform is known as iCAVE2. The project is led by Qiao.

As of 2018, Qiao has seven patents.

Qiao is the Department Chairman of the Computer Science and Engineering Department at University at Buffalo.
