= Young Woo Kang =

Korean-American disability rights advocate

Young Woo Kang (6 January 1944 – 24 February 2012) was a disability rights advocate, author, and speaker. He was known for his work in developing a braille alphabet for the Korean language. He was the Vice Chair of the World Committee on Disability. Kang was a former policy advisor of the National Council on Disability to the United States White House, serving under former president George W. Bush. In 2001, Kang received the Asian American Society's Outstanding Contribution and Achievement Award.

Kang was the former dean of South Korea's Taegu University, Supervisor of Special Education in Indiana, and was an adjunct professor at Northeastern Illinois University in Chicago.

In 1995, Kang's autobiography was made into a television and motion picture movie entitled, Bicheun nae gaseume (English: Light in My Heart). The film dramatized Kang's life as the first visually impaired Korean man to earn a Ph.D. In addition to film, the autobiography has been translated into seven languages and is a U.S. Library of Congress talking book. The film was honored with the Korean equivalent of the Emmy Award for the best drama in television.

== Personal background ==
Young Woo Kang was born in a small village near Seoul in South Korea. Kang's father died when he was 13 years old. The following year, Kang lost his eyesight in a sporting accident. At the time, there was widespread discrimination against disabled individuals. It was a common belief in traditional Korean culture that seeing a blind person would bring bad luck. Blind individuals were literally spit upon and treated as outcasts. When Kang's mother learned that her son would be permanently blind, she died of a heart attack that same day, while walking home from the hospital. At that time, Kang's 17-year-old sister dropped out of high school and took a sewing job to support her younger brother. The pressure was too great for her, and she died 16 months later. In the span of four years, Kang lost his eyesight, his parents, and his sister.

Kang was married to Kyoung, also known as Kay. Together, they had two sons, Paul and Christopher. Kyoung was a teacher for almost 30 years, working with visually impaired students in Gary, Indiana public schools. Kang's older son, Paul, is an ophthalmologist in Washington, D.C., while his younger son, Christopher, serves as Deputy Assistant to the President and Deputy Counsel to President Obama for White House Counsel. Christopher Kang formerly served as Senate Floor Counsel to Assistant U.S. Senate Democratic Leader Richard Durbin, overseeing constitutional, criminal justice, and labor issues.

Kang was a devout Christian.

== Educational background ==
Kang was the first blind person to be admitted to Yonsei University in Seoul, from which, he graduated with honors. He then went on to the University of Pittsburgh School of Education in Pennsylvania. In 1976, he became the first blind Korean to earn both a Master's degree and a doctorate. A Rotary Foundation Scholar while at the University of Pittsburgh, he earned his master's degree in special education and rehabilitation counseling and his doctorate in education.

== Professional background ==
Kang was the current Vice Chairman of the World Committee on Disability, working in this capacity, he was a driving force behind the establishment of the Franklin D. Roosevelt International Disability Award. Established in 1995, this award recognizes and encourages progress by nations in expanding the participation of people with disabilities, in fulfillment of the goals of the United Nations.

In 2002, President George W. Bush nominated Kang to serve as a policy adviser on the National Council on Disability, an independent federal agency that makes recommendations to the President and Congress in pursuit of enhancing the quality of life for Americans with disabilities and their families. After confirmation by the Senate, Kang worked on issues ranging from the inclusion of people with disabilities in emergency planning to cultural differences and attitudes in empowering people with disabilities. He also supported the research and development of six kinds of electronic devices for disabled people, including mobile phones and automatic teller machines.

== Death ==
Kang died February 24, 2012, from pancreatic cancer. He was 68.

== Honors and awards ==
- Honorary Doctorate in Literature from Yonsei University in Seoul, Korea
- Rotary Foundation's Distinguished Service Award
- Human Rights Award from Fairfax County (Virginia) Human Rights Commission

== Published works ==
- Kang, Young Woo. My Disability--God's Ability: 7 Principles of Triumphant Life, Abingdon Press, 2004. ISBN 978-0-687-33921-1
- Kang, Young Woo. The Wisdom Driven Life Korean: Seven Keys to a Successful Life, Abingdon Press, 2007. ISBN 978-0-687-64245-8
- Kang, Young Woo. A Light in My Heart: Faith and Hope and the Handicapped, Word of Life Press, 2003. ISBN 978-89-04-15445-6
