= Kevin W. Sharer =

American businessman (born 1948)

Kevin W. Sharer (born March 2, 1948), is an American businessman who was chairman/CEO of the biotechnology company Amgen from 2000 to 2012. He later joined the faculty of Harvard Business School teaching RC Strategy and General Management.

== Early life and education ==
Sharer was born on March 2, 1948 in Clinton, Iowa. He studied aeronautical engineering at the U.S. Naval Academy and graduated in 1970 with a BSAE. In 1971 he received an MS in aeronautical engineering from the US Naval Postgraduate School. He received his MBA from the University of Pittsburgh's Joseph M. Katz Graduate School of Business in 1982.

== Career ==
Sharer served in the navy from 1970 through 1978. He served on two nuclear submarines. At the age of 27, he became construction engineer officer on the USS Memphis (SSN-691) and served as part of the commissioning crew. He left the navy with the rank of lieutenant commander.

From 1978 to 1982, Sharer worked at AT&T Long Lines in engineering and sales management. Sharer was a consultant at McKinsey & Company, from 1982 to 1984 in Washington, D.C.

From 1984 to 1989 Sharer worked at General Electric (GE). He left as a corporate vice president to join MCI Communications. He was at MCI from 1989 to 1992 with responsibility for sales and marketing and as GM of the business markets division.

Sharer joined the biotech firm Amgen in 1992 as president / chief operating officer and board member. From 2000 to 2012 he was chairman/CEO of Amgen.

Sharer joined the faculty of Harvard Business School in 2012 and has taught courses in strategy and general management to MBA and executive education students.

Sharer co-wrote with Adam Bryant The CEO Test, which was published by Harvard.

== Personal ==
With his wife, Sharer started the Sharer Foundation, which provides financial and programmatic support to community college students who transfer to a four-year university to earn their Bachelor's degree. He has two children and three stepchildren.
