= Human subject research legislation in the United States =

Human subject research legislation in the United States can be traced to the early 20th century. Human subject research in the United States was mostly unregulated until the 20th century, as it was throughout the world, until the establishment of various governmental and professional regulations and codes of ethics. Notable – and in some cases, notorious – human subject experiments performed in the US include the Tuskegee syphilis experiment, human radiation experiments, the Milgram obedience experiment and Stanford prison experiments and Project MKULTRA. With growing public awareness of such experimentation, and the evolution of professional ethical standards, such research became regulated by various legislation, most notably, those that introduced and then empowered the institutional review boards.

== Early research and legislation ==
Aside from the Pure Food and Drug Act of 1906 and the Harrison Act of 1914 banning the sale of some narcotic drugs, there was no federal regulatory control ensuring the safety of new drugs. Thus the early calls for regulation of human experimentation concerned medicine, and in particular, testing of new pharmaceutical drugs and their release on the market.

In 1937, a drug known as Elixir Sulfanilamide was released without any clinical trials. Reports in the press about potentially lethal side effects led to a public outcry. Investigation by the American Medical Association showed that a poisonous compound, diethylene glycol, was present in the drug. The AMA concluded that the drug caused more than a hundred deaths – yet the contemporary law did not require the company that released it to test it (the existing laws required only that a drug be clearly labeled, no false claims be made about it, and that it was not adulterated). A new legislation was proposed by the Secretary of Agriculture to address the issue but was weakened after opposition from business interests. It was finally included in the Federal Food, Drug, and Cosmetic Act of 1938.

In the aftermath of World War II, and what became recognized as deeply unethical human experimentation carried out by the Nazis, the Nuremberg Code – ethical principles governing international human experimentation – were founded. The code highlighted 3 key elements (voluntary informed consent, favorable risk/benefit analysis, and right to withdraw without repercussions) which later became the foundation for further human research regulations. However, neither the Nuremberg Code nor the Federal Food, Drug and Cosmetic Act of 1938 prevented the "thalidomide tragedy" of the early 1960s. Thalidomide was introduced in 1958, and there were reports of it being unsafe for certain groups, such as pregnant women and young children; however, although the Food and Drug Administration did not approve it for market, the existing regulations allowed relatively unrestricted testing of the drug. This led to the abuse of approved drug testing as the means to further a promotional marketing strategy. This was addressed by the Drug Amendments legislation of 1962, which introduced a requirement for a series of animal tests before proceeding with human experimentation, and a total of three phases of human clinical trials before a drug can be approved for the market. The inadequacy of the 1938 and 1962 acts was exposed by revelations in the 1960s and 1970s.

== 60s and 70s: Beecher's study and the Tuskegee syphilis experiment ==
Another milestone came with Henry K. Beecher's 1966 study as published in the New England Journal of Medicine. His study became instrumental in the implementation of federal rules on human experimentation and informed consent. Beecher's study listed over 20 cases of mainstream research where subjects were subject to experimentation without being fully informed of their status as research subjects, and without knowledge of the risks of such participation in the research. Some of the research subjects died or were permanently crippled as a result of that research. One of the cases analyzed was the Willowbrook State School Case, in which children were deliberately infected with hepatitis, under disguise of a vaccination program.

Beecher's findings were not alone. Evidence emerged that soon after the introduction of nuclear weapons, soldiers and civilians were subjected to potentially dangerous levels of radiation – without consent – to test its health effects (see Advisory Committee on Human Radiation Experiments and human radiation experiments in the United States).

While most major controversies about unethical research were focused on biomedical sciences, there were also controversies involving behavioral, psychological, and sociological experiments such as: the Milgram obedience experiment, Stanford prison experiment, Tearoom Trade study, and others. There were also ethical issues related to the CIA's Project MKULTRA.

The Tuskegee syphilis experiment is probably the most infamous case of unethical medical experimentation in the United States. Starting in 1932, investigators recruited 399 impoverished African-American sharecroppers with syphilis for research related to the natural progression of the untreated disease, in hopes of justifying treatment programs for blacks. By 1947, penicillin had become the standard treatment for syphilis, but the Tuskegee scientists decided to withhold penicillin (and information about it) from the patients. The study continued under numerous supervisors until 1972, when a leak to the press resulted in its termination. Victims included a number of men who died of syphilis, their wives who contracted the disease, and some children who were born with syphilis. Even when the results were made public, the initial reaction of the medical scientific community was to exonerate the study and criticize the popular press for interfering with the research.

In 1976, the National Institutes of Health (NIH) Office for Protection of Research Subjects (OPRR) was created, and issued its Policies for the Protection of Human Subjects which recommended establishing independent review bodies, later called institutional review boards.

== Rise of the IRB ==
In 1969, Kentucky Court of Appeals Judge Samuel Steinfeld dissented in Strunk v. Strunk, 445 S.W.2d 145, and made the first judicial suggestion that the Nuremberg Code should apply to American jurisprudence.

By the early 1970s, cases like the Willowbrook State School and the Tuskegee syphilis experiments were being raised in the U. S. Senate. As controversy over human experiments continued, the public opinion criticized research where the science seemed to be valued over the good of the subjects.

In 1974, Congress passed the National Research Act which established the National Commission for the Protection of Human Subjects of Biomedical and Behavioral Research (CPHS) and mandated that the Public Health Service come up with regulations that would protect the rights of human research subjects. The Commission work from 1974-1978 resulted in 17 reports and appendices, of which the most important were the Institutional Review Board Report and the Belmont Report ("Ethical Principles and Guidelines for the Protection of Human Subjects of Research"). The IRB Report endorsed the establishment and functioning of the Institutional Review Board institution, and the Belmont Report, the Commission's last report, identified "basic ethical principles" applicable to human subject experimentation that became modern guidelines for ethical medical research: "respect for persons", "beneficence" and "justice".

However, contemporaneous critics of the National Commission for the Protection of Human Subjects of Biomedical and Behavioral Research and the Belmont Report argued that while physicians and psychologists were prominent in those commissions, there were few experienced social scientists on them. As a result, they argued, research standards aimed at medical and psychological research were misapplied to all social science research as well. Members of the Belmont Report later acknowledged some of these criticisms. A later conference in September 1979 organized by Tom Beauchamp, who co-authored the Belmont Report, sought to remedy that by hosting social scientists and ethicists and resulted in an anthology. However, the conference lacked the official status of the National Commission for the Protection of Human Subjects of Biomedical and Behavioral Research, and did not influence subsequent legislation.

In 1975, the Department of Health, Education and Welfare (DHEW) created regulation which included the recommendations laid out in the NIH's 1966 Policies for the Protection of Human Subjects. Title 45 of the Code of Federal Regulations, known as "The Common Rule," requires that institutional review boards (IRBs) oversee experiments using human subjects.

== Beyond IRBs ==
The National Commission was superseded by the Ethical Advisory Board (EAB), which in turn was superseded in 1980 by the President's Commission for the Study of Ethical Problems in Biomedical and Behavioral Research (PCEMR). EAB focused on the issues of in vitro fertilization and prohibited the creation of fetuses for research purposes; and PCEMR issues recommendation on subjects such as brain death, access to health services, withdrawal of life-support systems, and testing in regards to genetic disease.

In 1980 the FDA made prisoners ineligible to be subjects of new drug testing in clinical trials (21 CFR 50.44).

On January 15, 1994, President Bill Clinton formed the Advisory Committee on Human Radiation Experiments (ACHRE). This committee was created to investigate and report the use of human beings as test subjects in experiments involving the effects of ionizing radiation in federally funded research. The committee attempted to determine the causes of the experiments, and reasons why the proper oversight did not exist, and made several recommendations to help prevent future occurrences of similar events. In 1995 (or 1996 – sources vary) a National Bioethics Advisory Commission was established, opining on issues such as cloning of humans, and research involving mentally disabled. In 2001, The President's Council on Bioethics was founded to consider bioethics issues, such as stem cell research. Committee review of research has since then become a standard part of American attitude to ethical issues in science. In 2009, the Obama administration replaced this body with the Presidential Commission for the Study of Bioethical Issues.

== Research that does not require IRB review ==
Some provisions of medical research regulation allow certain research project to proceed without IRB review. For example, in the United States, research that uses electronic health record of deceased patients does not require IRB review.
