= Mary Margaret Speer =

American mathematician (1906–1966)

- Born: Mary Margaret Taylor; March 27, 1906; Midway, Pennsylvania
- Died: November 23, 1966 (aged 60); Pittsburgh, Pennsylvania
- Education: University of Pittsburgh
- Occupation: Mathematician
- Known for: Earning a PhD in math before World War II
- Spouse: Eugene R. Speer (m. 1935)
- Children: 3

Mary Margaret Speer (March 27, 1906 in Midway, Pennsylvania – November 23, 1966 in Pittsburgh) was an American mathematician and university instructor and one of the few women to earn a PhD in math before World War II.

== Biography ==
Mary Margaret Taylor was the only daughter and third of four children born to Hallie Blanche Virginia Criss and Albert Aaron Taylor. Mary completed the three-year curriculum at Midway High School from 1918 to 1921. For her last year, she attended Carnegie High School just west of Pittsburgh where she was chosen to receive a four-year college scholarship based on an annual competitive examination sponsored by nearby Washington County, Pennsylvania. From 1922 to 1926 she undertook a double major in mathematics and Latin offered by the University of Pittsburgh. After receiving her honors BA degree in 1926, she was elected to the Sigma Kappa Phi honor society, a national foreign language honorary fraternity, and the Women's Studies Honor Society in Pittsburgh.

From 1926 to 1930, while Taylor was working as a teaching assistant at the University of Pittsburgh, she completed her master's degree in 1928 with a thesis titled: A note on the solution in series of the general homogeneous linear differential equation. She attended summer programs at the University of Chicago during the summer of 1928 and then continued her work toward her PhD at Pittsburgh. From 1930 to 1934 Taylor taught math courses at University's regional campus in Johnstown, Pennsylvania, before moving back to the university's main campus in Pittsburgh as a graduate assistant and she finished her PhD studies. Taylor received her doctorate in 1935 with the dissertation: Reciprocals of Certain Curves and Surfaces with Respect to a Space Cubic Curve directed by Forest Almos Foraker.

In 1935, she married the mathematician and lawyer Eugene R. Speer (1903–1978), with whom she had three children, all of whom also went on to study mathematics. For the school year 1936–1937, she is listed in the university catalogue as a graduate assistant using her new name Mary Margaret Speer. From 1937 through 1943, she is listed as an instructor of mathematics but she left the university after being told that men with less experience were receiving promotions to associate professor ahead of her because "the men had families to support and needed the money." This occurred even though Mary and her husband were already the parents of one child by that time.

Speer was an active member and administrator of the Girl Scouts of Allegheny County, from the early 1950s until her death of cancer in Pittsburgh in 1966 at the age of 60.

== Selected publications ==
=== Publication ===
- 1929: [Taylor, M. M.] (Translator from the Latin) On the theory of combinations, by Jacques Bernoulli. In A Source Book in Mathematics, ed. D. E. Smith. New York: McGraw-Hill Book Co. Reprint: 1959. New York: Dover Publications.

=== Abstracts ===
- 1937: Reciprocals with respect to a space cubic. Amer. Math. Monthly 44:187 #1. Presented to the MAA, Beaver Falls, PA, 26 Oct 1935.
- 1939: Types of curvature of curves and surfaces. Amer. Math. Monthly 46:536 #4. Presented to the MAA, Greenville, PA, 13 May 1939.
