= Michael Clinton =

American writer, Founder/CEO of ROARforward, and former magazine publisher

- Born: Pittsburgh, Pennsylvania
- Education: University of Pittsburgh; Pace University (MBA, 1983)
- Occupations: Publisher; writer; photographer
- Employers: Fairchild Publications; Condé Nast; Hearst Magazines
- Board member of: International Center of Photography

Michael A. Clinton is a magazine publishing executive, entrepreneur, speaker, author and magazine writer. He is CEO/Founder of ROARforward, a B2B business intelligence platform in the New Longevity sector. He was publisher of GQ magazine from 1988 to 1994 and subsequently senior vice president and executive vice president of publisher Condé Nast until 1997. He joined Hearst Magazines as senior vice president and chief marketing officer and soon after added the publishing director title at Hearst. From 2010, he was the president, marketing and publishing director of Hearst Magazines and also served on the board of directors of The Hearst Corporation. He currently serves as senior media advisor to the CEO of Hearst.

A graduate of the University of Pittsburgh and Pace University's Lubin School of Business, in 2021 he earned an MS degree from Columbia University. His bestselling book,'ROAR: Into the Second Half of Your Life (Before It's Too Late)’ was published in September 2021 and became the springboard for the business ROARforward. Clinton began his career as a reporter for DNR, a men's wear trade journal. He has composed 8 books of photography, and 2 collections of essays. His most recent book, “Longevity Nation: The People, Ideas, and Trends Changing the Second Half of Lives” was published in May 2026.

== Early life and education ==
Clinton was born in Pittsburgh, Pennsylvania, to Joe Clinton Sr. and Nancy Clinton, the oldest of 6 siblings. He graduated magna cum laude with a bachelor's degree in economics and political science from the University of Pittsburgh. In 1983, Clinton earned an MBA from Pace University's Lubin School of Business. He also received a degree of Doctor of Humane Letters from Pace University in May 2013 and also serves on the board of trustees of the university.

Clinton also earned an M.S. in nonprofit management from Columbia University in 2021.

== Magazine career ==
In 1978, Clinton began his career as a reporter for DNR, a men's wear trade journal published by Fairchild Publications. He later moved over to the business side of publishing. In the mid-1980s, he joined Condé Nast, which publishes GQ magazine. He was ad director at GQ until late 1988, when he became publisher of the magazine. He led GQ magazine until late 1994, when he became senior vice president at Condé Nast, and later executive vice president.

Clinton left Condé Nast, in August 1997, to join the competitor Hearst Magazines, in October 1997, as senior vice president and chief marketing officer. The following year, he became group publisher of five magazines, including Esquire and House Beautiful. In 2001, he was appointed as publishing director at Hearst and, in June 2010, was named president, marketing and publishing director of Hearst Magazines. During his tenure, he helped start several magazine labels, including O, The Oprah Magazine, Food Network Magazine, HGTV Magazine and The Pioneer Woman Magazine. He also helped acquire Hachette Filipacchi Media, publisher of Elle, as well as Rodale, publisher of Men's Health and Runner's World. In July 2019, Clinton retired as president, marketing and publishing director of Hearst. He continues to serve as a senior media advisor to the Hearst CEO and president Steve Swartz. In addition, Clinton has written for publications including Afar, The New York Times, and Town & Country.

== Photography and books ==
In 2004, he published Wanderlust: A Personal Journey, a book of essays and photographs he took while traveling in more than 100 countries. He then published a series of three books, Global Snaps (2005), Global Faces (2007), and Global Remains (2011), along with American Portraits (2010), which focuses on 100 American subjects from as many countries.

Clinton is a trustee of the International Center of Photography in New York. He has also exhibited his work in galleries, including a 2013 solo exhibition, Wanderlust, at the Tulla Booth Gallery in Sag Harbor, New York.

His 2013 book, Globetrotter Diaries: Tales, Tips and Tactics for Traveling the 7 Continents, includes a collection of essays with advice to travelers compiled from his own experience and contributions from his colleagues, magazine editors and publishers Pamela Fiori, Nancy Novogood, and Kate White.

In 2015, Clinton released his seventh book, Closer: Seeing the World in Details, containing detailed close-up stills from about 30 countries he has visited. In 2016, Clinton's The Hamptons includes photographs and descriptions of scenes on The Hamptons, from Shinnecock Hills to Montauk. His 2018 book, Santa Fe, documents the eponymous city in New Mexico. In Tales From the Trails: Runners' Stories That Inspire and Transform (2019), Clinton features several stories of how running has benefited people's lives.

In September 2021, Clinton released his eleventh book, ROAR: Into the Second Half of Your Life (Before It's Too Late), published by Atria Books/Beyond Words. The book draws its title from an acronym for a mantra by Clinton: "Reimagine yourself, Own who you are, Act on what's next for you, Reassess your relationships". The book describes how people may transform themselves later in life and pursue a new career trajectory by "rewiring or 'refiring' for what could be another 30 or 40 years of life". Clinton had completed a survey of people in the workforce and interviewed 40 people who had transitioned into a different career later in life. Amy Lindren writes for the Pioneer Press that, "In a refreshing twist, Clinton moves beyond the quit-your-job model of renewal with his concept of 'life-layering'—adding something to your life to help balance the job that you may not be able to quit at the moment."

== Personal life ==
Clinton is a private pilot and learned to fly in the late 1990s. He is also an avid traveler who has visited more than 123 countries. As a former board member and supporter of Starlight Children's Foundation, he has raised money for the foundation by leading expeditions to Nepal, Patagonia, and to the top of Mount Kilimanjaro. He lives in Manhattan, New York, and Santa Fe, New Mexico.

Clinton also enjoys running and has run races in more than 60 countries, completing marathons in each of the seven continents. He ran his first marathon as an unregistered "bandit" at the 1978 New York City Marathon. He has run marathons in London, Buenos Aires, the Australian Gold Coast, Mount Kilimanjaro, and Philadelphia. In August 2013, Clinton completed the Mongolia Sunrise to Sunset Marathon. He ran a marathon on Antarctica in March 2014, becoming one of 440 runners to complete a marathon in every continent as of 2014.

He is also the founder of Circle of Generosity, a foundation that grants random acts of kindness to people in need.

== Bibliography ==
- Wanderlust: A Personal Journey (2004). Glitterati. ISBN 978-1-5768722-5-3.
- Global Snaps: 500 Photographs from 7 Continents (2005). Glitterati. ISBN 978-0-976585-11-4.
- Global Faces: 500 Photographs from 7 Continents (2007). Glitterati. ISBN 978-0-977753-10-9.
- American Portraits: 100 Countries (2010). Glitterati. ISBN 978-0-9822669-1-5.
- Global Remains: Abandoned Architecture and Objects from Seven Continents (2011). Glitterati. ISBN 978-0-9823799-5-0.
- Globetrotter Diaries: Tales, Tips and Tactics for Traveling the 7 Continents (2013). Glitterati ISBN 978-0-9851696-6-4.
- Closer: Seeing the World in Details (2015). Glitterati. ISBN 978-0-9905320-2-6.
- The Hamptons (2016). Glitterati. ISBN 978-1-943876-09-9.
- Santa Fe (2018). Glitterati. ISBN 978-1-943876-55-6.
- Tales from the Trails: Running for Life (2019). Glitterati. ISBN 978-1-943876-61-7.
