= Marc Chandler =

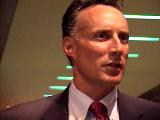
- Born: July 23, 1961 (age 65); Chicago, Illinois
- Education: Northern Illinois University; University of Pittsburgh; North Central College
- Occupations: Managing Partner and Chief Market Strategist, Bannockburn Global Forex

Marc Chandler (born July 23, 1961) is a foreign exchange market analyst, writer, speaker, and professor. On August 19, 2009, Bloomberg L.P. published Chandler's first book, Making Sense of the Dollar.

== Media presence ==
Chandler has been a frequent guest on CNBC, Bloomberg Television, FOX Business, Business News Network, and Nightly Business Report where he provides his insights on the global capital markets.

Chandler has been published in the Financial Times, Foreign Affairs, Barrons, The Nation, Euromoney Institutional Investor, and Corporate Finance. He is regularly published by Seeking Alpha and TheStreet.com.

Chandler also writes daily in his blog "Marc to Market", and is called upon for many in-person speaking engagements.

== Book publications ==
Chandler's first book Making Sense of the Dollar was published in August 2009. In February 2017, Chandler's second book, Political Economy of Tomorrow was published. His third book, Surplus: The History of Too Much and the End of Economic Primacy is being published by Prometheus in early November 2026.

== Views ==
In 2007 Chandler began advocating the dollar and has maintained that viewpoint throughout the crisis.

His new book picks up a theme presented in the first book and develops it at length. Drawing on the work of Charles Conant, a late 19th century/early 20th century journalist and strategic adviser to senior government official, Chandler suggests that the biggest challenge of the market economy comes from its successes (not it failures) and these cannot be simply reformed away. Capitalism produces more wealth than it can absorb. The surplus generates instability and forces social relationships to change in order to accommodate the surplus.

== Education and career ==
Chandler attended North Central College for undergraduate studies and holds Master's Degrees from Northern Illinois University and University of Pittsburgh in American History and International Political Economy.

Between 2005 and 2018, Chandler was the head of Global Currency Strategy at Brown Brothers Harriman, before which he was head of Global Currency Strategy at HSBC and BNY Mellon. He joined Bannockburn Global Forex in October 2018 as Managing Partner and Chief Market Strategist.

== Personal life ==
He resides in Manhattan with his wife and son. He is a lifelong Chicago Cubs fan.

== Honors and awards ==
Chandler was a professor at the New York University School of Professional Studies, where he received the Excellence in Teaching Award in 2009. He is an Honorary Fellow at the Foreign Policy Association.
