= Sling, Anglesey =

Coordinates: 53.277357°N 4.121639°W

Sling
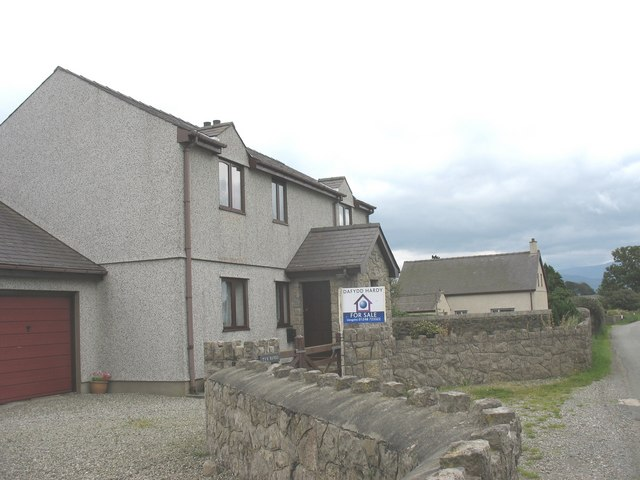

- Location within Anglesey
- OS grid reference: SH 5863 7770
  - Cardiff: 130.4 mi (209.9 km)
  - London: 208.1 mi (334.9 km)
- Community: Llanddona
- Principal area: Anglesey
- Country: Wales
- Sovereign state: United Kingdom
- Post town: Beaumaris
- Police: North Wales
- Fire: North Wales
- Ambulance: Welsh
- UK Parliament: Ynys Môn
- Senedd Cymru – Welsh Parliament: Ynys Môn

Sling is an area in the community of Llanddona, Anglesey, Wales, which is 130.4 miles (209.8 km) from Cardiff and 208.1 miles (334.8 km) from London.

It was the location of Sling Chapel.

== See also ==
- List of localities in Wales by population
