= Jagdish Sheth =

Professor of Marketing (born 1938)

Jagdish N. Sheth (born 1938) is the Charles H. Kellstadt Professor of Marketing at the Goizueta Business School of Emory University. He was involved during the initial years of the Indian Institute of Management Calcutta, the first Indian Institute of Management. Sheth was awarded by the Padma Bhushan award in 2020 for his work in literature and education in the United States.

== Early life ==
Sheth was born in Burma (now Myanmar) to a Jain family. In 1941, the family emigrated to India. He received most of his schooling in Madras (now Chennai). It was here that he met his future wife, Madhuri Shah.

== Career ==
Sheth came to the United States and received his MBA at the University of Pittsburgh in 1962. He pursued a career in academia. During the mid-1960s he studied and researched at MIT, Columbia and the University of Pittsburgh, where he received his PhD in 1966 from its Katz Graduate School of Business. It was during this period and whilst he was based at the University of Illinois, Urbana-Champaign, that he started developing his "Theory of Buyer Behavior".

In 2017, he was named a fellow of the Association for Consumer Research.

Sheth has published more than 200 articles in journals and has written a number of books. He published an article entitled A Model of Industrial Buyer Behavior in 1973, which drew from a large volume of empirical study of buyer behavior and emphasised how the "psychological world of the decision-makers" impacted on the processes and outcomes of purchasing decision-making. His books include Tectonic Shift: The Geoeconomic Realignment of Globalizing Markets with Rajendra S. Sisodia, The Rule of Three: Surviving and Thriving in Competitive Markets, Clients for Life: How Great Professionals Develop Breakthrough Relationships, and Handbook of Relationship Marketing. In 2007, he published The Self-Destructive Habits of Good Companies. In 2008, he published Chindia Rising. In 2014, he published The Accidental Scholar.

The "Sheth Family Foundation" has established Sheth International Awards at the University of Pittsburgh's University Center for International Studies. In 2003, Sheth founded the "India, China & America Institute" (ICA Institute), a non-profit group that published newsletters and held seminars related to emerging markets, commercial growth, and alignment of policies between those three nations. He was also founding chairman of the Academic Council of the Mumbai Business School, a business school located in Mumbai, India, but which closed after attracting just 15 students.
