= Michael Slinger =

American law professor

Michael Slinger is the Associate Dean for Information Services and Technology, Director of the Legal Information Center, and Professor of Law at the Widener University School of Law. He previously spent 13 years as Associate Dean and Director of the Law Library at Cleveland-Marshall College of Law, Cleveland State University. He is from Pittsburgh, Pennsylvania. Slinger received his B.A. from the University of Pittsburgh, M.L.S. from University of South Carolina and J.D. from Duquesne University.

== Early career ==
Slinger started his career on the faculty of the University of Notre Dame Law School Library under Roger Jacobs. Slinger served as Law Library Director and Professor of Law at Suffolk University School of Law from 1990 to 1995.

He taught advanced and basic legal research courses.

== Career ==
Slinger inspects law schools for the American Bar Association. He is the former president of ALL-SIS and Ohio Regional Association of Law Libraries. He has also served on the Executive Committee of the Association of American Law Schools Section on Libraries, the American Bar Association Law Libraries Committee and was Chair of the Academic Special Interest Section of the American Association of Law Libraries.

Slinger's interest in the American Civil War has led him to teach a course on legal issues stemming from the Civil War. He also recently participated in the debate "Lincoln and Civil Liberties" at Widener Law on a panel with the Honorable Randy J. Holland (Delaware Supreme Court) and James L. Swanson (author of Manhunt: The 12-Day Chase for Lincoln's Killer). He often attends the Civil War Institute at Gettysburg College.

== Published works ==
- "Faculty Scholarship on Display: An Enriching Experience", 9 Law Notes 18 (2002).
- "Placing the Horse Before the Cart: The Need to Convince Law Firm Partners and Law Professors of the Inadequacy of Legal Research Training at Law Schools as a First Step in Developing a Successful Training Solution", in Expert Views on Improving the Quality of Legal Research Education in the United States (West Publishing, 1992).
- "Opening a Window of Opportunity: The Library Staff as a Meaningful and Integrated Part of the Law School Community", 83 Law Library Journal 685 (1991). (Winner of the 1990 American Association of Law Libraries Call for Papers Competition).
- "he Senate’s Power of Advice and Consent on Judicial Appointments: An Annotated Bibliography and Research Guide", 64 Notre Dame Law Review 106 (1989) (with L. Payne and J. Gates).
- "A Comprehensive Study of the Career Path and Education of Current Academic Law Library Directors", 80 Law Library Journal 217 (1988). (Winner of the 1987 American Association of Law Libraries Call for Papers Competition).
- "The Art and Science of Appellate Opinion Drafting: An Annotated Bibliography", 80 Law Library Journal 115 (1988). (Reprinted in Judicial Opinion Writing Manual, 151, West Pub. Co., 1991.)
- A Selected Bibliography on the Economic Costs of Crime, (Vance Bibliographies, 1989).
