= Kevin March (businessman) =

American businessman

Kevin P. March is an American business executive, and was formerly the chief financial officer and senior vice-president of technology manufacturing giant, Texas Instruments.

== Education ==
March graduated in 1983 from the University of Pittsburgh with a bachelor's degree in economics and business before receiving an MBA from Pitt in 1984.

== Career ==
Kevin joined TI after graduation in 1984, working in an array of different positions throughout the Dallas-based company. In 2002, March was appointed Controller of TI, and in October 2003, was named CFO, replacing longtime TI CFO Bill Aylesworth. In 2008, March was named CFO of the Year for large public companies by Dallas Business Journal.

== Personal life ==
Kevin and his wife Carol currently live in Dallas, Texas, and have two children, Sean and Shannon. Sean lives in New York City and Shannon lives in Austin.
